= List of constituencies of Malawi =

Constituencies of Malawi are single-member electoral areas used to elect representatives to the National Assembly, the lower house of the Parliament of Malawi. In 2022, the Malawi Electoral Commission increased the number of constituencies from 193 to 229 following a boundary review aimed at aligning representation with population distribution. The 2025 general election is the first to be conducted using the new constituency boundaries. Each constituency elects one Member of Parliament through the first-past-the-post voting system.

== Northern Region ==
Sources

1. Chitipa North Constituency
2. Chitipa Central Constituency
3. Chitipa East Constituency
4. Chitipa Chendo Constituency
5. Chitipa South Constituency
6. Karonga Songwe Constituency
7. Karonga Lufilya Constituency
8. Karonga Central Constituency
9. Karonga Nyungwe Constituency
10. Karonga South Constituency
11. Karonga Town Constituency
12. Rumphi North Constituency
13. Rumphi West Constituency
14. Rumphi East Constituency
15. Rumphi Central Constituency
16. Mzimba North Constituency
17. Mzimba West Constituency
18. Mzimba Kafukule Constituency
19. Mzimba North East Constituency
20. Mzimba Central Constituency
21. Mzimba East Constituency
22. Mzimba Hora Constituency
23. Mzimba South West Constituency
24. Mzimba Solola Constituency
25. Mzimba Perekazi Constituency
26. Mzimba South Constituency
27. Mzimba South East Constituency
28. Mzimba Luwerezi Constituency
29. Nkhata Bay North Constituency
30. Nkhata Bay Mpamba Constituency
31. Nkhata Bay Central Constituency
32. Nkhata Bay West Constituency
33. Nkhata Bay Chintheche Constituency
34. Nkhata Bay South Constituency
35. Mzuzu City North Constituency
36. Mzuzu City South West Constituency
37. Mzuzu City South East Constituency
38. Likoma Island Constituency

== Central Region ==
Sources

1. Nkhotakota Dwangwa Constituency
2. Nkhotakota Liwaladzi Constituency
3. Nkhotakota Central Constituency
4. Nkhotakota Chia Constituency
5. Nkhotakota Mkhula Constituency
6. Kasungu North Constituency
7. Kasungu North West Constituency
8. Kasungu North East Constituency
9. Kasungu North North East Constituency
10. Kasungu Central Constituency
11. Kasungu West Constituency
12. Kasungu South West Constituency
13. Kasungu South Constituency
14. Kasungu East Constituency
15. Kasungu South East Constituency
16. Kasungu Municipality Constituency
17. Ntchisi North Constituency
18. Ntchisi West Constituency
19. Ntchisi Central East Constituency
20. Ntchisi East Constituency
21. Ntchisi South Constituency
22. Dowa Kasangadzi Constituency
23. Dowa Mphudzu Constituency
24. Dowa Ngala Constituency
25. Dowa Mdolera Constituency
26. Dowa Central Constituency
27. Dowa North East Constituency
28. Dowa West Constituency
29. Dowa East Constituency
30. Dowa South East Constituency
31. Dowa Central East Constituency
32. Salima North Constituency
33. Salima Central West Constituency
34. Salima Central Constituency
35. Salima Central East Constituency
36. Salima South Linthipe Constituency
37. Salima South Constituency
38. Mchinji North Constituency
39. Mchinji North East Constituency
40. Mchinji East Constituency
41. Mchinji West Constituency
42. Mchinji Central East Constituency
43. Mchinji South West Constituency
44. Mchinji South Constituency
45. Lilongwe Chilobwe Constituency
46. Lilongwe Mphande Constituency
47. Lilongwe Mude Constituency
48. Lilongwe Demera Constituency
49. Lilongwe Chiwamba Constituency
50. Lilongwe East Constituency
51. Lilongwe Mapuyu North Constituency
52. Lilongwe Nkhoma Constituency
53. Lilongwe Likuni Constituency
54. Lilongwe Central Constituency
55. Lilongwe Mpenu Constituency
56. Lilongwe Machenga Constituency
57. Lilongwe Mapuyu South Constituency
58. Lilongwe Nyanja Constituency
59. Lilongwe Msozi Constituency
60. Lilongwe Bunda Constituency
61. Lilongwe Phirilanjuzi Constituency
62. Lilongwe Msinja North Constituency
63. Lilongwe Msinja South Constituency
64. Lilongwe City Lumbadzi Constituency
65. Lilongwe City Dzenza Constituency
66. Lilongwe City Centre Constituency
67. Lilongwe City Chipala-Nafisi Constituency
68. Lilongwe City Nankhaka Constituency
69. Lilongwe City Mtandire-Mtsiriza Constituency
70. Lilongwe City Bwaila Constituency
71. Lilongwe City Masintha Constituency
72. Lilongwe City Mbuka Constituency
73. Lilongwe City Mlodza Constituency
74. Lilongwe City Kamphuno Constituency
75. Lilongwe City Ngwenya Constituency
76. Dedza Mayani Constituency
77. Dedza Mlunduni Constituency
78. Dedza Kasina Constituency
79. Dedza Mtakataka Constituency
80. Dedza Linthipe Constituency
81. Dedza Boma Constituency
82. Dedza Golomoti Constituency
83. Dedza Chikoma Constituency
84. Dedza Mphunzi Constituency
85. Dedza Dzalanyama Constituency
86. Ntcheu North Constituency
87. Ntcheu Bwanje Constituency
88. Ntcheu North West Constituency
89. Ntcheu Central East Constituency
90. Ntcheu Central Constituency
91. Ntcheu Dzonzi Mvai Constituency
92. Ntcheu Central Central East Constituency
93. Ntcheu South Constituency

== Southern Region ==
Sources

1. Mangochi North Constituency
2. Mangochi Lutende Constituency
3. Mangochi East Constituency
4. Mangochi Monkey Bay Constituency
5. Mangochi West Constituency
6. Mangochi Central Constituency
7. Mangochi North East Constituency
8. Mangochi Masongola Constituency
9. Mangochi South West Constituency
10. Mangochi South Constituency
11. Mangochi Malombe Constituency
12. Mangochi Mkungulu Constituency
13. Mangochi Municipal Constituency
14. Balaka Ulongwe Constituency
15. Balaka Bwaila Constituency
16. Balaka Ngwangwa Constituency
17. Balaka Rivirivi Constituency
18. Balaka Mulunguzi Constituency
19. Machinga North East Constituency
20. Machinga South East Constituency
21. Machinga Central Constituency
22. Machinga East Constituency
23. Machinga Mikoko Constituency
24. Machinga Central East Constituency
25. Machinga Likwenu Constituency
26. Machinga South Constituency
27. Zomba Malosa Constituency
28. Zomba Nsondole Constituency
29. Zomba Chingale Constituency
30. Zomba Likangala Constituency
31. Zomba Changalume Constituency
32. Zomba Ntonya Constituency
33. Zomba Matiya Constituency
34. Zomba Thondwe Constituency
35. Zomba Chikomwe Constituency
36. Zomba City North Constituency
37. Zomba City South Constituency
38. Chiradzulu Nyungwe Constituency
39. Chiradzulu Masanjala Constituency
40. Chiradzulu Thumbwe Constituency
41. Chiradzulu Nguludi Constituency
42. Chiradzulu Midima Constituency
43. Phalombe North Constituency
44. Phalombe North East Constituency
45. Phalombe Machemba Constituency
46. Phalombe South Constituency
47. Phalombe East Constituency
48. Blantyre North Constituency
49. Blantyre Central Constituency
50. Blantyre West Constituency
51. Blantyre North East Constituency
52. Blantyre South West Constituency
53. Blantyre South East Constituency
54. Blantyre City South Lunzu Constituency
55. Blantyre City Michiru-Chirimba Constituency
56. Blantyre City Mapanga-Mpingwe-Mzedi Constituency
57. Blantyre City Ndirande-Malabada-Nyambadwe Constituency
58. Blantyre City Chilomoni-Kabula-Nancholi Constituency
59. Blantyre City Mbayani-Mussa-Magasa Constituency
60. Blantyre City Nkolokoti-Ndirande-Matope Constituency
61. Blantyre City Chichiri-Misesa Constituency
62. Blantyre City Soche-Zingwangwa Constituency
63. Blantyre City Chigumula-BCA-Club-Banana Constituency
64. Mwanza Central Constituency
65. Mwanza West Constituency
66. Neno North Constituency
67. Neno East Constituency
68. Neno South Constituency
69. Thyolo Mikolongwe Constituency
70. Thyolo Goliati Constituency
71. Thyolo Bvumbwe-Masenjere Constituency
72. Thyolo Khonjeni-Mangunda Constituency
73. Thyolo Central Constituency
74. Thyolo Thava Constituency
75. Thyolo Masambanjati Constituency
76. Thyolo Thekelani Constituency
77. Luchenza Municipal Constituency
78. Mulanje North Constituency
79. Mulanje West Constituency
80. Mulanje Pasani Constituency
81. Mulanje South West Constituency
82. Mulanje Limbuli Constituency
83. Mulanje South Constituency
84. Mulanje Central Constituency
85. Mulanje South East Constituency
86. Mulanje Bale Constituency
87. Chikwawa West Constituency
88. Chikwawa North Constituency
89. Chikwawa Central West Constituency
90. Chikwawa Central Constituency
91. Chikwawa East Constituency
92. Chikwawa Mkombedzi Constituency
93. Chikwawa South Constituency
94. Nsanje North Constituency
95. Nsanje Lalanje Constituency
96. Nsanje Central Constituency
97. Nsanje South West Constituency
98. Nsanje South Constituency
