= Ezekiel Peter Ching'oma =

Malawian politician (born 1981)

Malawi Minister of Homeland Security
- In office January 2025 – October 2025
- President: Lazarus Chakwera
- Preceded by: Ken Zikhale Ng'oma
- Succeeded by: Peter Mukhito

Member of National Assembly of Malawi
- In office 2009–2025

Personal details
- Born: 20 January 1981 (age 45) Lilongwe, Malawi
- Party: Malawi Congress Party
- Education: University of Malawi; University of Essex
- Occupation: Politician

Ezekiel Peter Ching'oma (born 20 January 1981) is a Malawian politician. He served as a Member of Parliament representing Lilongwe East Constituency from 2009 and in January 2025 he was appointed Minister of Homeland Security in the government of Lazarus Chakwera until October 2025. He is a member of the Malawi Congress Party.

== Education ==
Ching'oma studied Journalism at the former Malawi Polytechnic, now Malawi University of Business and Applied Sciences, where he earned a bachelor's degree between 2002 and 2006. He later obtained a Diploma in Law from University of Malawi in 2017. In 2023, he completed a Bachelor of Laws (LLB) at the University of Essex in the United Kingdom.

== Political career ==
In 2009, Ching'oma was elected to the National Assembly of Malawi as Member of Parliament representing Lilongwe East Constituency. He was re-elected in subsequent parliamentary elections and represented the constituency as a member of Malawi Congress Party until 2025. He also led the Pan-African Parliament Malawi chapter. His tenure ended upon his appointment to cabinet. Ching'oma held leadership roles at the Malawi Congress Party including the Deputy and Acting Publicity Secretary of the Party.

=== Cabinet ===
In January 2025, Ching'oma was appointed Minister of Homeland Security by President Lazarus Chakwera following a cabinet reshuffle prompted by findings from the Chilima plane crash inquiry. He succeeded Kenneth Zikhale Ng’oma as part of broader efforts to strengthen coordination and accountability within Malawi's security sector. During his tenure, Ching'oma launched the Independent Complaints Commission Strategic Plan (2025–2029), aimed at improving oversight and accountability within the police service and strengthning Police-Citizen Relations. In 2025, Ching'oma presented a prison reform bill to the National Assembly of Malawi, which was subsequently passed into law and led to the repeal of the 1956 Prisons Act of Malawi.
