= Lilongwe South East Constituency =

Malawian electoral constituency

- First-past-the-post constituency for the Parliament of Malawi
- District: Lilongwe
- Region: Central Region

Current constituency
- Party: MCP
- Member(s): Gwengwe Alfred Willard

Lilongwe South East Constituency is a constituency for the National Assembly of Malawi, located in the Lilongwe District of Malawi's Central Region. It is one of the 22 constituencies in Lilongwe District. It elects one Member of Parliament by the first past the post system.

The constituency has several wards, all electing councilors for the Lilongwe District. In 2009, the member of parliament who represented the constituency was Gwengwe Alfred Willard.

== Members of parliament ==
Elections	MP	Party	Notes	References
2009	Gwengwe Alfred Willard	MCP	Multi-party system	

== See also ==
- Lilongwe City South East Constituency
- Lilongwe City South West Constituency
