= Kasungu North East Constituency =

Malawian electoral constituency

Kasungu North East
- First-past-the-post constituency for the Parliament of Malawi
- District: Kasungu
- Region: Central Region
- Major settlements: Kasungu

Current constituency
- Party: MCP
- Member: Madalitso Wirima Kambauwa

Kasungu North East Constituency is a constituency for the National Assembly of Malawi, located in the Kasungu District of Malawi's Central Region.

It is one of several constituencies in Kasungu District. It elects one Member of Parliament by the first past the post system. The constituency has multiple wards, all electing councilors for the Kasungu District Council. The constituency is currently represented by MP Madalitso Wirima Kambauwa of the MCP.

== Members of parliament ==
MP	Party	Notes	References
2019	Madalitso Wirima Kambauwa	MCP	Multi-party system
