= Lilongwe North West Constituency =

Malawian electoral constituency

- First-past-the-post constituency for the Parliament of Malawi
- District: Lilongwe
- Region: Central Region

Current constituency
- Party: MCP
- Member: Ishmail Fillimon Chafukira

Lilongwe North West Constituency is a constituency for the National Assembly of Malawi, located in the Lilongwe District of Malawi's Central Region. It is one of the 22 constituencies in Lilongwe District. It elects one Member of Parliament by the first past the post system.

The constituency has several wards, all electing councilors for the Lilongwe District. In 2009, the member of parliament who represented the constituency was Ishmail Fillimon Chafukira.

== Members of parliament ==
Elections	MP	Party	Notes	References
2009	Ishmail Fillimon Chafukira	MCP	Multi-party system	
