= Kasungu North West Constituency =

Malawian electoral constituency

Kasungu North West
- First-past-the-post constituency for the Parliament of Malawi
- District: Kasungu
- Region: Central Region
- Major settlements: Kasungu

Current constituency
- Party: MCP
- Member: Paul Dumembe Nkhoma

Kasungu North West Constituency is a constituency for the National Assembly of Malawi, located in the Kasungu District of Malawi's Central Region.

It is one of several constituencies in Kasungu District. It elects one Member of Parliament by the first past the post system. The constituency has multiple wards, all electing councilors for the Kasungu District Council. The constituency is currently represented by MP Paul Dumembe Nkhoma of the MCP.

== Members of parliament ==
| MP | Party | Notes | References |
|---|---|---|---|
| 2019 | Paul Dumembe Nkhoma | MCP | Multi-party system |
