= 1983 Malawian general election =

| ← 1978 | 29–30 June 1983 | 1987 → |

All 101 elected seats in the National Assembly 51 seats needed for a majority
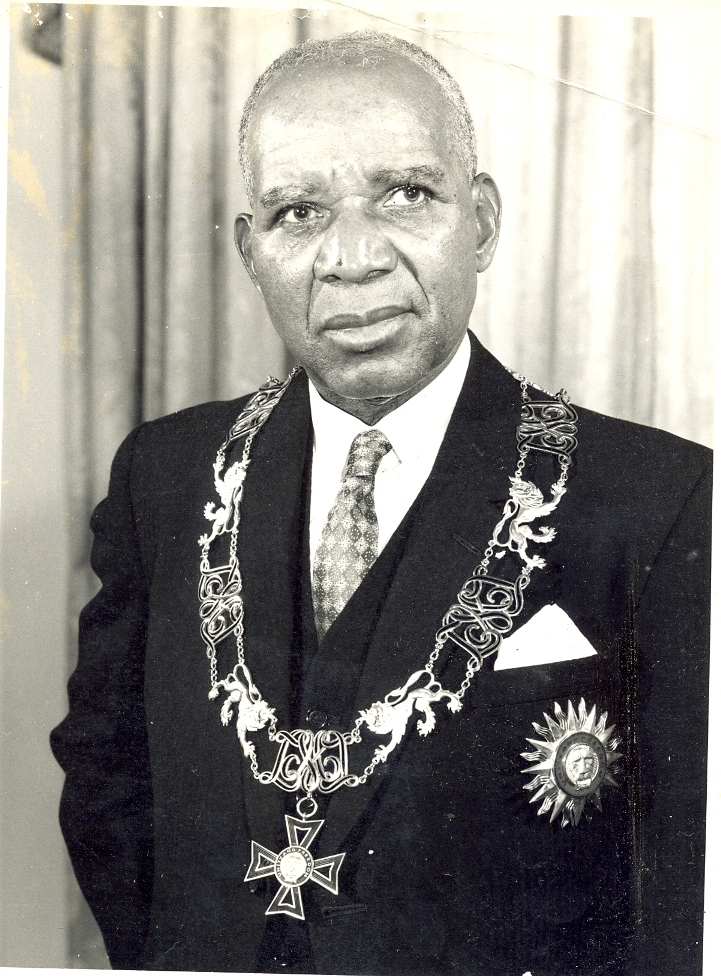
| | First party |
|---|---|
| Leader | Hastings Banda |
| Party | MCP |
| Last election | 87 |
| Seats won | 101 |
| Seat change | ▲14 |

General elections were held in Malawi on 29 and 30 June 1983. As the country had become a one-party state in 1966, the Malawi Congress Party was the sole legal party at the time. The number of seats was increased to 101, whilst president for life Hastings Banda was able to appoint as many additional members as he saw fit to "enhance the representative character of the Assembly, or to represent particular minority or other special interests in the Republic." Ultimately, an additional 11 members were appointed.

In 21 constituencies there was only a single MCP candidate, who was elected unopposed. In the remaining 80 seats there were between two and five candidates, all of which were from the MCP. All prospective candidates were vetted by Banda after being nominated by MCP committees, and had to declare their allegiance to Banda in order to be allowed to stand.

== Results ==
| Party | Votes | % | Seats | +/– |
|---|---|---|---|---|
| Malawi Congress Party | | | 101 | +14 |
| Appointed members | | | 11 | –4 |
| Total | | | 112 | +10 |
| Registered voters/turnout | 3,278,907 | – | | |
Source: African Elections Database, IPU
