= Lilongwe Nkhoma Constituency =

Malawian electoral constituency

- First-past-the-post constituency for the Parliament of Malawi
- District: Lilongwe
- Region: Central Region

Current constituency
- Party: IND
- Member: Pilirani Buleya

Lilongwe Nkhoma Constituency, formerly known as Lilongwe Mpenu Nkhoma Constituency, is a constituency for the National Assembly of Malawi, located in the Lilongwe District of Malawi's Central Region. It is one of the 22 constituencies in Lilongwe District. It elects one Member of Parliament by the first past the post system. The constituency has several wards, all electing councilors for the Lilongwe District.

In 2021 Collins Kajawa, MP for the constituency, asked the Malawi Electoral Commission to change the name of the constituency to Lilongwe Nkhoma Constituency, to avoid confusion with is neighbour Lilongwe Mpenu Constituency. The Commission agreed to start consultation on the name change. The change of name was in place by the time of the 2025 Malawian general election.

In 2025, the member of parliament who represented the constituency was Pilirani Buleya.

== Members of parliament ==
Elections	MP	Party	Notes	References
1999	Louis Joseph Chimango	UDF		
2004	Louis Joseph Chimango	MCP		
2009	Joyce Azizi Banda	IND	Multi-party system	
2014	Collins Kajawa	IND		
2019	Collins Kajawa	MCP	Multi-party system	
2025	Pilirani Buleya	IND		
