= Kasungu South East Constituency =

Malawian electoral constituency

Kasungu South East
- First-past-the-post constituency for the Parliament of Malawi
- District: Kasungu
- Region: Central Region
- Major settlements: Kasungu

Current constituency
- Party: MCP
- Member: Bauden Mphatso Mtonga

Kasungu South East Constituency is a constituency for the National Assembly of Malawi, located in the Kasungu District of Malawi's Central Region.

It is one of several constituencies in Kasungu District. It elects one Member of Parliament by the first past the post system. The constituency has multiple wards, all electing councilors for the Kasungu District Council. The constituency is currently represented by MP Bauden Mphatso Mtonga of the MCP.

== Members of parliament ==
| MP | Party | Notes | References |
|---|---|---|---|
| 2019 | Bauden Mphatso Mtonga | MCP | Multi-party system |
