= Kasungu West =

Malawian electoral constituency

- First-past-the-post constituency for the Parliament of Malawi
- District: Kasungu
- Region: Central Region
- Major settlements: Kasungu

Current constituency
- Party: MCP
- Member: Jailosi Kalenje Bonongwe

Kasungu West Constituency is a constituency for the National Assembly of Malawi, located in the Kasungu District of Malawi's Central Region.

It is one of several constituencies in Kasungu District. It elects one Member of Parliament by the first past the post system. The constituency has multiple wards, all electing councilors for the Kasungu District Council. The constituency is currently represented by MP Jailosi Kalenje Bonongwe of the MCP.

== Members of parliament ==
Year	MP	Party	Notes	References
2019	Khumbize Kandodo Chiponda	MCP	Multi-party system	
2025	Jailosi Kalenje Bonongwe	MCP		
