= Kasungu East Constituency =

Malawian electoral constituency

Kasungu East
- First-past-the-post constituency for the Parliament of Malawi
- District: Kasungu
- Region: Central Region
- Major settlements: Kasungu

Current constituency
- Party: MCP
- Member: Madalitso Kazombo

Kasungu East Constituency is a constituency for the National Assembly of Malawi, located in the Kasungu District of Malawi's Central Region.

It is one of several constituencies in Kasungu District. It elects one Member of Parliament by the first past the post system. The constituency has multiple wards, all electing councilors for the Kasungu District Council. The constituency is currently represented by MP Madalitso Fred Kwaderanji Kazombo of the MCP.

== Members of parliament ==
MP	Party	Notes	References
2019	Madalitso Kazombo	MCP	Multi-party system
