= Kasungu South West Constituency =

Malawian electoral constituency

Kasungu South West
- First-past-the-post constituency for the Parliament of Malawi
- District: Kasungu
- Region: Central Region
- Major settlements: Kasungu

Current constituency
- Party: Independent
- Member: Milliam Jekapu

Kasungu South West Constituency is a constituency for the National Assembly of Malawi, located in the Kasungu District of Malawi's Central Region.

It is one of several constituencies in Kasungu District. It elects one Member of Parliament by the first past the post system. The constituency has multiple wards, all electing councilors for the Kasungu District Council. The constituency was represented by MP Jailosi Kalenje Bonongwe of the MCP in 2019. In the 2025 election they chose Milliam Jekapu who was an independent.

== Members of parliament ==
MP	Party	Notes	References
2019	Jailosi Kalenje Bonongwe	MCP	Multi-party system
2025	Milliam Jekapu	Independent	Multi-party system
