= Dedza South Constituency =

Malawian electoral constituency

- First-past-the-post constituency for the Parliament of Malawi
- District: Dedza
- Region: Central Region

Current constituency
- Party: MCP
- Member(s): John Zenas Ungapake Tembo

Dedza South Constituency is a constituency for the National Assembly of Malawi, located in the Dedza District of Malawi's Central Region. It is one of the 8 constituencies in Dedza District. It elects one Member of Parliament by the first past the post system.

The constituency has several wards, all electing councilors for the Dedza District. In 2009, the member of parliament who represented the constituency was John Zenas Ungapake Tembo.

== Members of parliament ==
Elections	MP	Party	Notes	References
2009	John Zenas Ungapake Tembo	MCP	Multi-party system	
