= Dedza South West Constituency =

Malawian electoral constituency

- First-past-the-post constituency for the Parliament of Malawi
- District: Dedza
- Region: Central Region

Current constituency
- Party: MCP
- Member(s): Clement Claude Mlombwa

Dedza South West Constituency is a constituency for the National Assembly of Malawi, located in the Dedza District of Malawi's Central Region. It is one of the 8 constituencies in Dedza District. It elects one Member of Parliament by the first past the post system.

The constituency has several wards, all electing councilors for the Dedza District. In 2009, the member of parliament who represented the constituency was Clement Claude Mlombwa.

== Members of parliament ==
Elections	MP	Party	Notes	References
2009	Clement Claude Mlombwa	MCP	Multi-party system	
