= Mzimba Luwelezi Constituency =

Malawian electoral constituency

- First-past-the-post constituency for the Parliament of Malawi
- District: Mzimba
- Region: Northern Region
- Major settlements: Ekwendeni

Current constituency
- Party: MCP
- Member(s): Samuel Chirwa

Mzimba Luwelezi Constituency is a constituency for the National Assembly of Malawi, located in the Mzimba District of Malawi's Northern Region. It is one of 13 constituencies in Mzimba District. It elects one Member of Parliament by the first past the post system. The constituency has ten wards, all electing councilors for the Mzimba District. The constituency is currently represented by United Transformation Movement MP, Sam Chirwa.

== Members of parliament ==
Elections	MP	Party	Notes	References
2019	Sam Chirwa	UTM	Multi-party system	
