= Raspicious Dzanjalimodzi =

Respicious Dzanjalimodzi (died 2007) was the MCP shadow finance minister and MP for Lilongwe City South West in Malawi. He was the spokesperson for the finance division of the MCP.

Dzanjalimodzi was highly regarded as a future leader of the then opposition Malawi Congress Party. In 2008 he died at a South African clinic after travelling to South Africa for some family business.

== See also ==
- List of current members of the National Assembly of Malawi
