= Lilongwe City Centre Constituency =

Malawian electoral constituency

- First-past-the-post constituency for the Parliament of Malawi
- District: Lilongwe
- Region: Central Region

Current constituency
- Party: MCP
- Member: Gift Nankhuni

Lilongwe City Centre Constituency is a constituency for the National Assembly of Malawi, located in the Lilongwe District of Malawi's Central Region. It is one of 22 constituencies in Lilongwe District. It elects one Member of Parliament by the first past the post system. The constituency has 4 wards, all electing councilors for the Lilongwe District. In 2009, the member of parliament who represented the constituency was Shadreck Jonasi.

In 2018 it was announced that Tay Grin hoped to be the DPP candidate in this constituency which was news to the sitting MP David Bisnowaty.

In the 2025 election there were seven candidates and MCP's Gift Nankhuni was elected.

== Members of parliament ==
Elections	MP	Party	Notes	References
2009	Shadreck Jonasi	DPP	Multi-party system	
2014	David Bisnowaty	DPP	Multi-party system	
2025	Gift Nankhuni	MCP	Multi-party system	
