= Nathenje =

- Location in Malawi
- Coordinates: 14°05′S 33°54′E
- Country: Malawi
- Region: Central Region
- District: Lilongwe District
- Time zone: +2
- Climate: Cwa

Nathenje is a town located in the Central Region district of Lilongwe in Malawi. Malawi's capital Lilongwe is approximately 19 kilometres (12 mi) away.
