= Lilongwe Kumachenga Constituency =

Malawian electoral constituency

- First-past-the-post constituency for the Parliament of Malawi
- District: Lilongwe
- Region: Central Region

Current constituency
- Member: Marko Ching’onga

Lilongwe Kumachenga Constituency is a constituency for the National Assembly of Malawi, located in the Lilongwe District of Malawi's Central Region. It is one of 22 constituencies in Lilongwe District. It elects one Member of Parliament by the first past the post system. The constituency has 6 wards, all electing councilors for the Lilongwe District. In 2009, the member of parliament who represented the constituency was Maureen Katani Bondo.

In 2018 Maureen Bondo again stood in the election for the MCP. It was close election as she won by just over 100 votes. She beat Kalele Grace Ghambi of the DPP.

During the 2025 election campaign, the incumbent President Lazerus Chakwera visited the constituency with candidate Marko Ching’onga. Chakwera promising a new district hospital in the area. Marko Ching’onga was an independent and he won the seat with over 8,000 votes. Maureen Bondo was second with less than 3,000 votes.

== Members of parliament ==
Elections	MP	Party	Notes	References
2009	Maureen Katani Bondo	MCP	Multi-party system	
2018	Maureen Katani Bondo	MCP	Multi-party system	
2025	Marko Ching’onga	Ind't	Multi-party system	
