= Lilongwe City South West Constituency =

Malawian electoral constituency

- First-past-the-post constituency for the Parliament of Malawi
- District: Lilongwe
- Region: Central Region

Current constituency
- Party: DPP
- Member(s): Wells John Adam

Lilongwe City South West Constituency is a constituency for the National Assembly of Malawi, located in the Lilongwe District of Malawi's Central Region. It is one of 22 constituencies in Lilongwe District. It elects one Member of Parliament by the first past the post system. The constituency has 8 wards, all electing councilors for the Lilongwe District. In 2009, the member of parliament who represented the constituency was Wells John Adam.

== Members of parliament ==
Elections	MP	Party	Notes	References
2009	Wells John Adam	DPP	Multi-party system	
