= Dedza District =

District of Malawi

Coordinates: 14°10′S 34°20′E

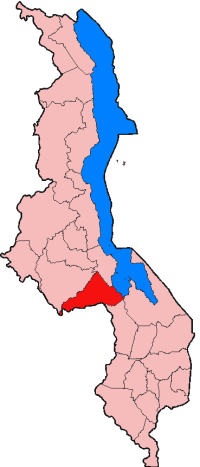
Location of Dedza District in Malawi

Dedza is a district in the Central Region of Malawi. It covers an area of 3,754 km.² to the south of the Malawi capital, Lilongwe, between Mozambique and Lake Malawi and has a population of 830,512. The capital is Dedza.

== Geography ==
The western part of the district is on the Central African Plateau at an altitude of 1 200 to 1,600 m. Higher mountain ranges separate this from land alongside Lake Malawi in the Rift Valley at 500 m. The landscape is a mixture of grassland with granite outcrops, natural woodland and commercial pine plantations on the mountains and some bamboo forest nearer the lake. The wet season is November to April with almost no rainfall at other times. The higher altitudes have moderate temperatures and can be cold in June and July.

The main town is Dedza Township located on the M1 road 85 km south of Lilongwe. The town has banks, post office, petrol stations, accommodation and a range of shops. There are smaller market towns with a post office, police station, shops and market—Lobi, Linthipe, Mayani, Mtakataka. Most of the people live in rural villages as subsistence farmers.

== Demographics ==
The initial results of the 2018 census put the population of the district at 830,512, an increase of 33% over the 2008 figure.

=== Ethnic groups ===
At the time of the 2018 Census of Malawi, the distribution of the population of Dedza District by ethnic group was as follows:

- 64.5% Chewa
- 20.6% Ngoni
- 9.4% Yao
- 3.6% Sukwa
- 0.7% Lomwe
- 0.3% Mang'anja
- 0.3% Tumbuka
- 0.2% Sena
- 0.1% Tonga
- 0.1% Nyanja
- 0.0% Nkhonde
- 0.0% Lambya
- 0.1% Others

== Notable people ==
Maliam Mdoko is a Yao and she became the first woman to be President of the Malawi Institute of Architects. She was born on Mleu Village in the Traditional Authority of Tambala.

== Government and administrative divisions ==
There are eight National Assembly constituencies in Dedza:

- Dedza Central
- Dedza Central East
- Dedza East
- Dedza North
- Dedza North West
- Dedza South
- Dedza South West
- Dedza West

Since the 2009 election all of these constituencies have been held by members of the Malawi Congress Party.

The district also has 32 wards that elect members to the Dedza District Assembly (the local government authority). There are 8 Traditional Authority Areas headed by chiefs and Dedza Township has its own Assembly.

== Transportation ==
The M1 road linking Lilongwe with Blantyre runs through the centre of the District. The M5 Salima to Balaka road runs parallel to the Lake and the S126 Masasa to Golomoti road joins the two just south of the district boundary. The western part of the district has no major roads.

== Economics ==
Apart from a commercial rice growing project at the side of Lake Malawi, agriculture is family based smallholdings. Larger businesses are limited to Paragon Ceramics (floor and roof tiles, Dedza Pottery ceramics), WICO Sawmill and a rose grower.

== Tourism ==
There are a number of tourist attractions in the district. There are four forest reserves—Dedza-Salima, Chongoni, Dedza Mountain and Mua-Livulezi. The Chongoni Rock Art Area is a UNESCO World Heritage Site. The Kungoni Cultural Centre at Mua has a museum that displays the cultural heritage of the tribes of central Malawi, a wood carving school and accommodation.

== Other ==
Theresa Kachindamoto is the paramount chief, or Inkosi, of the Dedza District. She is known for her forceful action in dissolving child marriages.

Dedza District is linked with Norwich, UK, by a UK-based charity—the Norwich-Dedza Partnership. The Partnership supports education, health, agriculture, tourism development and public sector organisations through volunteer workers, supply of computers and other materials and small scale funding.

== Cities & Towns in Dedza District ==
- Dedza (capital)
- Mua
- Lobi
