= Madalitso Kazombo =

Malawian politician (1979–2026)

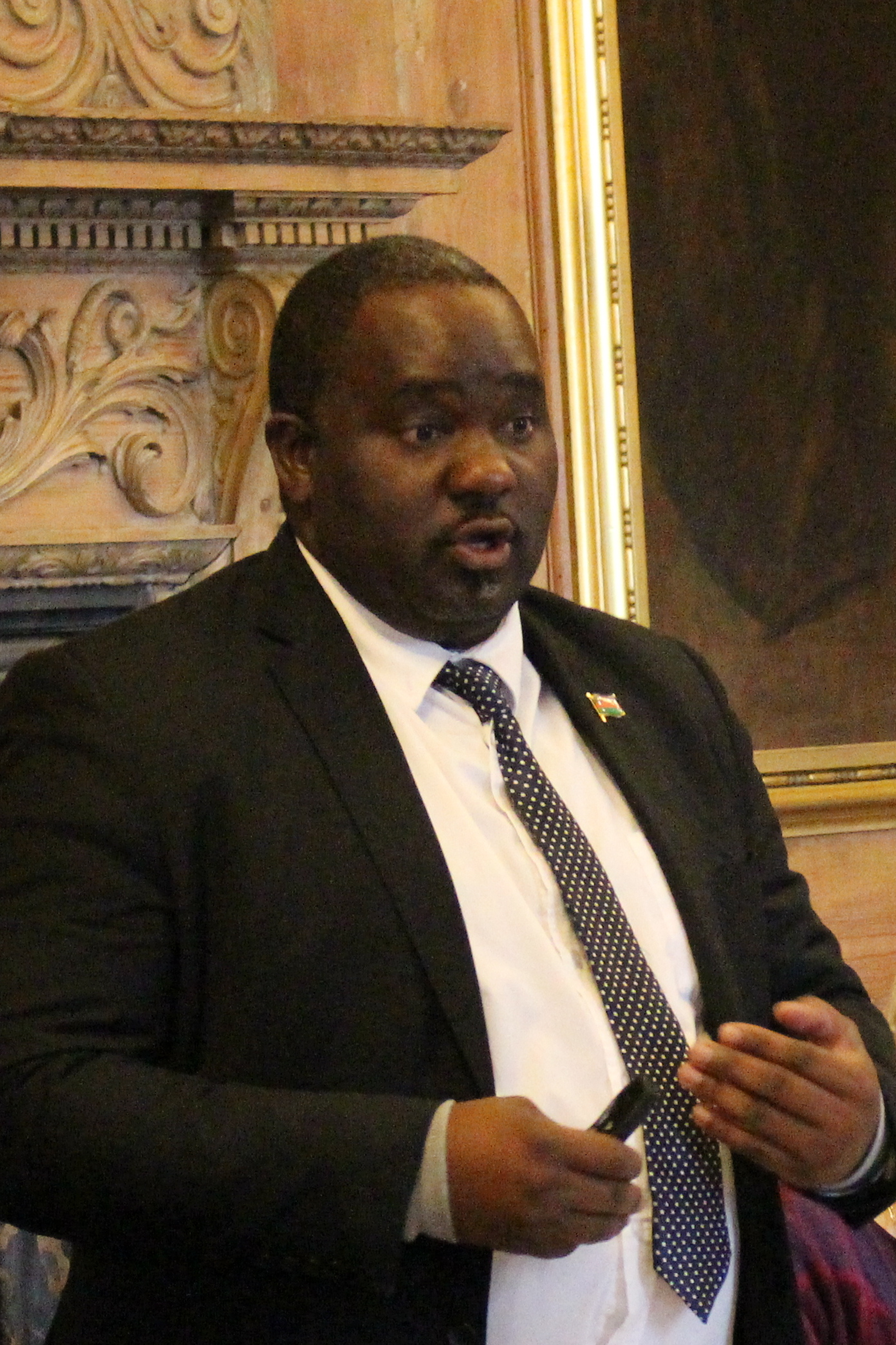
- in Scotland in 2020
- Born: Madalitso Fred K. Kazombo; May 31, 1979
- Died: January 8, 2026 (aged 46); Lilongwe
- Occupation: politician
- Known for: deputy speaker at the National Assembly
- Political party: Malawi Congress Party
- Children: 3

Madalitso Kazombo (31 May 1979 – 8 January 2026) was a Malawian accountant and an politician. He was first elected in 2015 in the Kasungu East Constituency. He was reelected in 2019 and he served as a deputy speaker.

== Life and career ==
Kazombo was born in 1979 and he was school at Kamazu Academy. He graduated from the University of Malawi after studying social science. He then studied at the Malawi College of Accountancy and he became a chartered accountant in 2009. He trained as an accountant and he became an internal auditor. He was elected in 2015 in the Kasungu East Constituency.

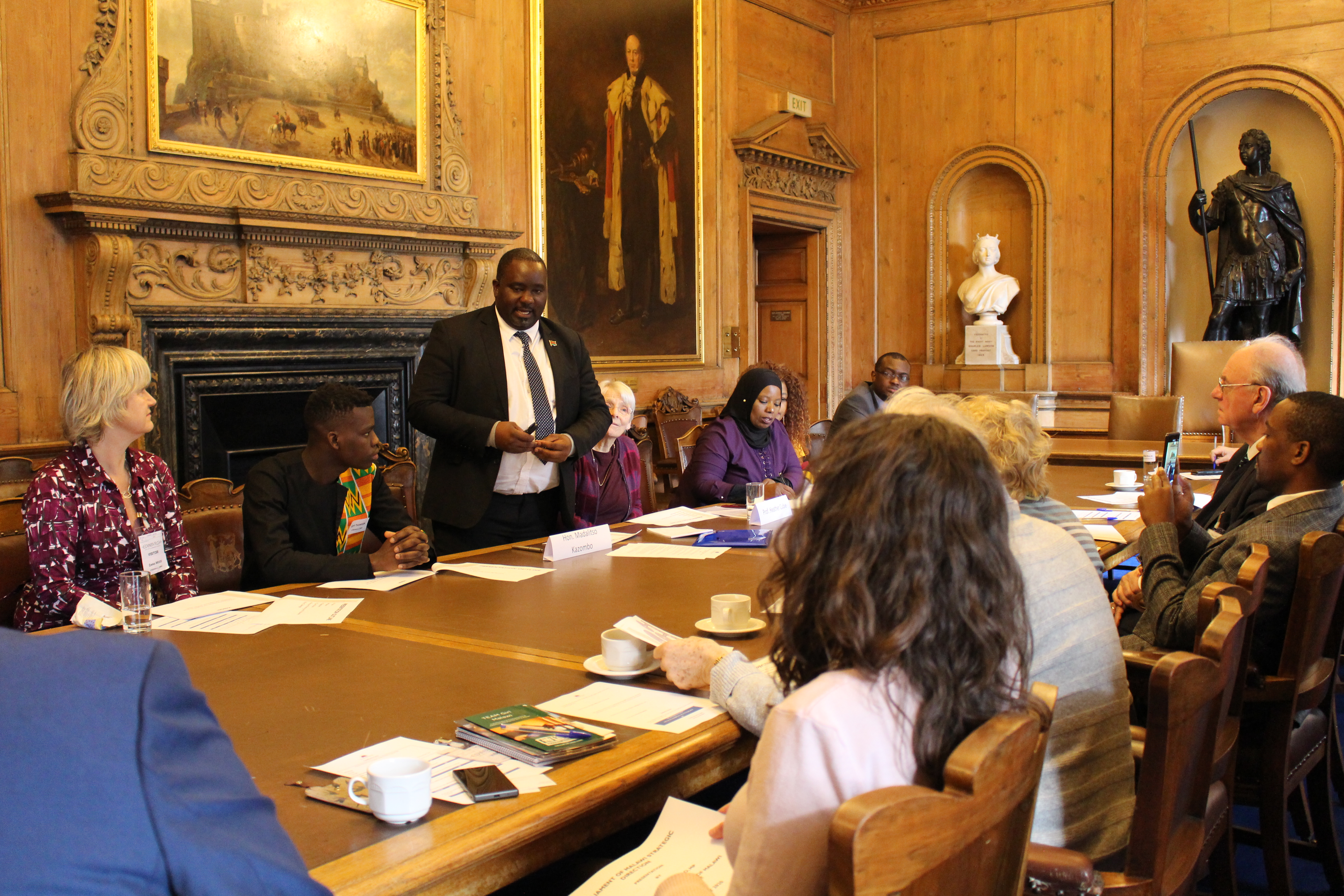
Madalitso Kazombo addressing a meeting in Scotland in 2020

He was re-elected in 2019 and he then served as the first deputy speaker of the National Assembly, representing the Malawi Congress Party. He and the second deputy speaker visited Scotland in 2020 where they met members of the Scotland Malawi Partnership. Kazombo was a member of parliament and a deputy speaker until 2025.

Kazombo died on 8 January 2026, after suffering an asthma attack.
