= Pilirani Buleya =

Pilirani Buleya Member of Parliament
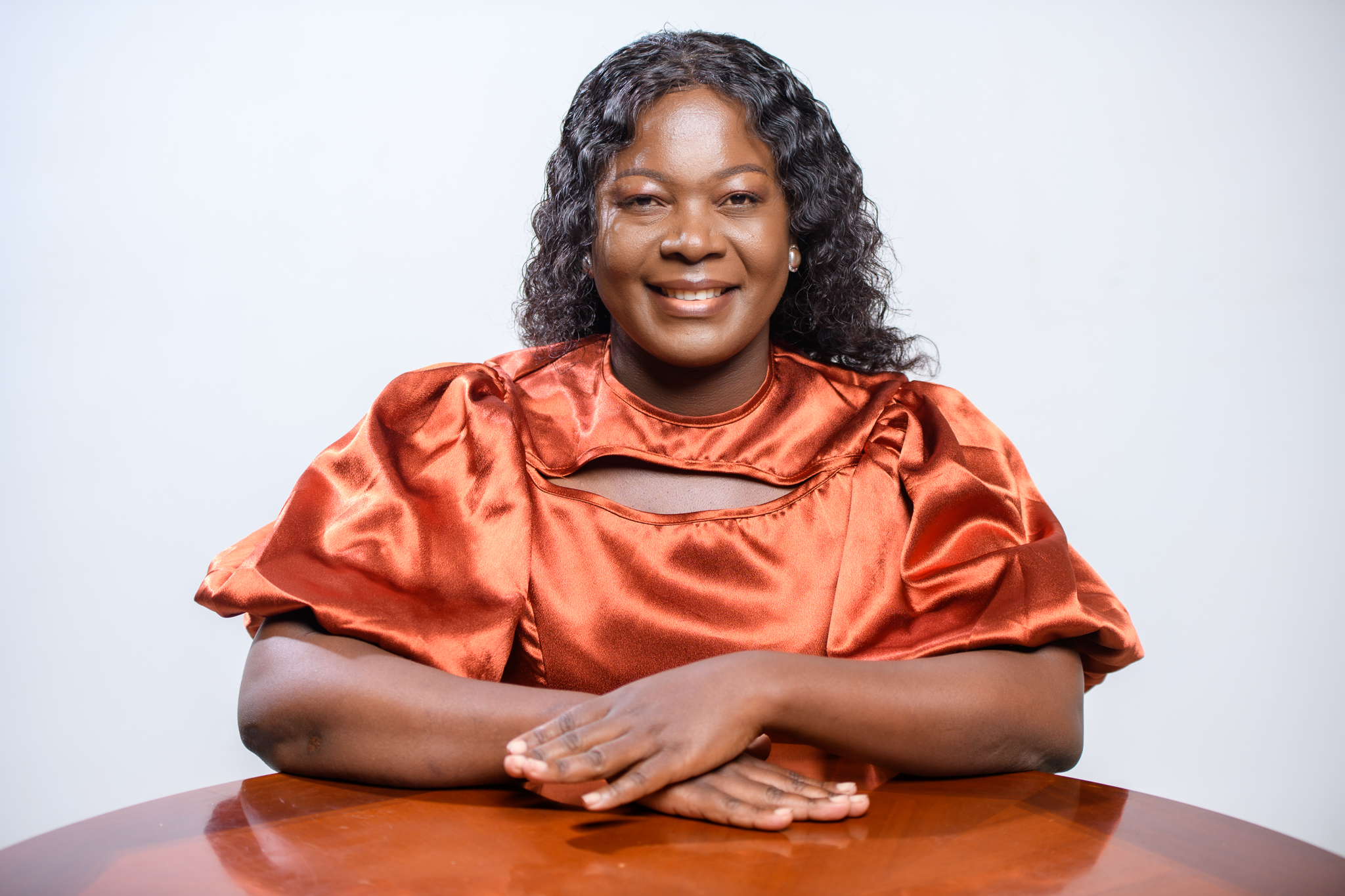
- Incumbent
- Assumed office 3 October 2025
- Constituency: Lilongwe Nkhoma Constituency

Pilirani Kaphagawani Buleya is a Member of the National Assembly in Malawi and a member of the Malawi Parliamentary Women's Caucus. Buleya won the 2025 Malawi General Elections representing Lilongwe Nkhoma Constituency, after competing as an independent candidate.

== Campaign ==
During the campaign period, Buleya chaired a group of independent political female aspirants and described how they struggled to finance their nomination fees and campaigns. She focused on responding to food insecurity in her constituency. In 2023 she had organised volunteers to plant seeds which yielded twelve bags of maize. Other villages asked to use her idea after they saw hunger being averted when she distributed the maize during the off season.

In August 2026 she was among a group of MPs who went to Area 3 Police Station to protest after MP George Kadzipatike was detained. He was the Malawi Congress Party (MCP) legal director and his fellow MPs believed he was arrested for political reasons. Jessie Kabwila spoke on behalf of the group. Kadzipatike was arrested following a tax dispute which the group felt was disproportionate.

== See also ==
- Women's 5050 Campaign in Malawi
