= Loveness Gondwe =

Malawian member of the Pan-African Parliament

Lovenes Gondwe a.k.a. Loveness Gondwe Chihana is a Malawian politician. Gondwe served as Malawi's deputy speaker of the National Assembly and she was a member of the Pan-African Parliament.

== Political career ==
Gondwe served as Malawi's deputy speaker. She then stood and was declared the winner of the Mziba West constituency in May 2004 by the Malawi Electoral Commission. There had been six candidates and Catherine Nyahara came second. Nyahara appealled citing severali rregulaties in the election by Gondwe her supporters and her husband. The judge disregarded several points but agreed that the election should be re-run. In 2005 Gongdwe and the MEC went again to the Supreme Court to appeal the first judge's decision. The Supreme Court came to the conclusion that Gondwe's initial victory was correct and her and the MEC's appeal was proven. Nyahara was ordered to pay costs.

She was a member of the Pan-African Parliament from Malawi. She challenged Bingu wa Mutharika in the 2009 Malawian general election. In 2018, she briefly joined the Malawi Congress Party (MCP) before she joined the United Transformation Movement.

She was a candidate in the Lilongwe City Ngwenya Constituency in the 2025 elections. That constituency was won by Nancy Tembo who narrowly beat Edward Mvoliwa, with them both having over 8,000 votes.
