= Mzuzu City Constituency =

Malawian electoral constituency

- First-past-the-post constituency for the Parliament of Malawi
- District: Mzimba
- Region: Northern Region

Current constituency
- Party: DPP
- Member: Peter Nelson Mwanza

Mzuzu City Constituency is a constituency for the National Assembly of Malawi, located in the Mzuzu City in Mzimba District of Malawi's Northern Region. It is one of 13 constituencies in Mzimba District. It elects one Member of Parliament by the first past the post system. The constituency has 17 wards, all electing councilors for Mzuzu City. In 2009, the constituency was represented by MP, Peter Nelson Mwanza.

== Members of parliament ==
| Elections | MP | Party | Notes | References |
|---|---|---|---|---|
| 2009 | Peter Nelson Mwanza | DPP | Multi-party system | |
