= Lilongwe North East Constituency =

Malawian electoral constituency

- First-past-the-post constituency for the Parliament of Malawi
- District: Lilongwe
- Region: Central Region

Current constituency
- Party: MCP
- Member(s): Lefani Maxwell Thyolera

Lilongwe North East Constituency is a constituency for the National Assembly of Malawi, located in the Lilongwe District of Malawi's Central Region. It is one of the 22 constituencies in Lilongwe District. It elects one Member of Parliament by the first past the post system.

The constituency has several wards, all electing councilors for the Lilongwe District. In 2009, the member of parliament who represented the constituency was Lefani Maxwell Thyolera.

== Members of parliament ==
| Elections | MP | Party | Notes | References |
|---|---|---|---|---|
| 2009 | Lefani Maxwell Thyolera | MCP | Multi-party system | |
| 2014 | Chrissy Tembo | | Multi-party system | |
