= Lilongwe North Constituency =

Malawian electoral constituency

- First-past-the-post constituency for the Parliament of Malawi
- District: Lilongwe
- Region: Central Region

Current constituency
- Party: MCP
- Member: Monica Chang'anamuno

Lilongwe North Constituency is a constituency for the National Assembly of Malawi, located in the Lilongwe District of Malawi's Central Region. It is one of the 22 constituencies in Lilongwe District. It elects one Member of Parliament by the first past the post system.

The constituency has several wards, all electing councilors for the Lilongwe District. In 2009, the member of parliament who represented the constituency was Bazilio Lunia Titus Malipa. However in 2019 and 2025 it was Monica Chang'anamuno.

== Members of parliament ==
Elections	MP	Party	Notes	References
2009	Bazilio Lunia Titus Malipa	MCP	Multi-party system	
2014	Patricia Mkanda	MCP		
2019	Monica Chang'anamuno	Independent		
2025	Monica Chang'anamuno	Independent		
