= Kasiya, Lilongwe =

- Location within Malawi
- Coordinates: 13.7728431°S 33.3746059°E
- Country: Malawi
- Region: Central Region, Malawi
- Municipality: Lilongwe District
- Time zone: UTC+ 2

Kasiya is a human settlement to the east of Malawi's capital Lilongwe and within the Lilongwe District. Kasiya had a new market opened in 2026. The area has recently discovered reserves of titanium ore.

== Description ==
In about 2020 it was discovered that the titanium ore rutile could be mined here. By mid 2021 it had been estimated that the deposit was significant. The quantity is globally significant and there was a reported shortage of rutile which can be used to make the white titanium oxide pigment or the metal which is used for sports equipment and aerospace.

Kasiya has a primary and a secondary school. In February 2024 the Minister of Education, Madalitso Wirima Kambauwa, chose the primary school to announce her "Building Education Foundation through Innovation and Technology" (BEFIT). The project is intended to improve digital education in all the 6000 primary schools in Malawi. It is based on the Unlocking Talent project which had delivered solar powered laptops to 217,000 primary students. The Unlocking Talent project was launched over a decade before and it had expanded in 2019 when funding was underwritten by the German government and work progressed with the support of Voluntary Service Overseas and the British One Billion organisation. The minister was supported by the German ambassador Ute Konig.

Kasiya has been the focus for a large project that delivered the Malembo Market. The market included not just shops but also market sheds, abattoirs and the supporting feeder roads. The original estimate was $1.3m. The final figure was K3.6 billion and it is the largest project by the Ministry of Local Government. The minister, Ben Phiri, was at the commissioning ceremony in February 2026. He noted that unusually the contractors had delivered in on-time and thanked the United Nations' International Fund for Agricultural Development. The project was scheduled to be complete in 2025.
