= National Association for People living with HIV/AIDS in Malawi =

Non-governmental organization in Malawi

- Abbreviation: NAPHAM
- Formation: June 1993; 33 years ago
- Founder: Winnie Chikafumbwa; Dorothy Mluwaza; Jane Paranjeta; Dickens Kolondo
- Founded at: Lilongwe, Area 47
- Type: NGO
- Legal status: Foundation
- Purpose: To provide a forum for people living with HIV/AIDS in Malawi
- Headquarters: Lilongwe, Malawi
- Region served: Central Region, Malawi
- Official language: English; Chewa; Tumbuka
- Subsidiaries: Kitchen Gardens; HIV Education Trust; Drug Revolving Fund
- Website: napham.org

National Association for People living with HIV/AIDS in Malawi (NAPHAM) is a Malawian non-governmental member-based organization founded in 1993 aiming at providing a forum for people living with HIV/AIDS in Malawi to share their experiences and find solutions to solve them. The organization was found with an intention to minimised discrimination against people living with HIV/AIDS as at the time people were stigmatized and treated as outcasts when diagnosed with HIV/AIDS.

Members of NAPHAM meet by yearly for the representation under Annual General Meeting. The board of trustees are elected every five years who is supported by a secretariat.

== Background ==
=== History ===
==== 1993: formation and NAPHA ====
NAPHAM began its journey as a small support group consisting of four people with HIV in Malawi in 1993. The members were Winnie Chikafumbwa, Dorothy Mluwaza, Jane Paranjeta, and Dickens Kolondo. The four initial members encouraged three other people to join. The three new members were Mrs. Munthali, Christopher Chisendera and Enock Mmbanga. At first, the organization was called National association for people living with AIDS (NAPHA) before changing to National Association for People living with HIV/AIDS in Malawi (NAPHAM) after the government of Malawi permitted the founders to use the name "Malawi". The founders of the organization began meeting the same year under a mango tree at Bwaila Hospital then called Bottom Hospital in August of 1993. Since then, the founders started meeting in Area 10 (Lilongwe0 in a volunteer house who voluntarily surrendered their house to be used as a meeting place. After few years, the founders began meeting in Mipondo house in Old Town, Lilongwe in a room where MACRO then LACE (Lilongwe AIDS and counselling Centre) gave them to be meeting once a week. The meeting took place every Sunday.

==== 1994 - 1995: Initial fund sources ====
The organization got its initial funds from Action Aid International in 1994 and started renting a room in Mipondo House, Lilongwe. In 1995, the organization got a second funding from AIDS FONDS that enabled the organization to recruit more staff members and rent a bigger work places. The same year, the organization moved to Chilinde where it secured a bigger infrastructure for rent. The organization's initial activities were group therapy (1993), Kitchen gardens (1994) and HIV education (1996), as well as IGAs (drug revolving fund) in 1998.

==== 2008 - 2013: Strategic Plan ====
From 2008 to 2013, the organisation developed a Strategic Plan to fight for the conducive environment to promote essential services for survival to minimise vulnerability and dependence. It also aimed at enhancing the care and support for PLWHIV and those that are being affected and promotional of personal development of people living with HIV/AIDS.

==== 2020s: Current state ====
The organization is now registered with the government under the Incorporation Act. It is referred to be the largest and oldest network of people living with HIV/AIDS. It has led to the birth of many PLHIV organizations in the country. NAPHAM currently has a membership of over 86,000 PLHIV in over 1,600 support groups. The organization has operational presence in all 28 districts of Malawi including Likoma Island.

== Subsidiary groups ==
=== The UNICEF-NAPHAM Youth Project ===
The UNICEF-NAPHAM Youth Project was launched in January 2009 for the young people. The project was attended by several organisation's youth leaders as well as other members from UNICEF under the supervision of Lilongwe District Coordinator. The training consisting of four-days aimed at empowering the youth to take an effective role in informing their peers about HIV prevention measures.
