= Lilongwe Msozi North Constituency =

Malawian electoral constituency

- First-past-the-post constituency for the Parliament of Malawi
- District: Lilongwe
- Region: Central Region

Current constituency
- Party: IND
- Member(s): Godfrey Kamanya

Lilongwe Msozi North Constituency is a constituency for the National Assembly of Malawi, located in the Lilongwe District of Malawi's Central Region. It is one of 22 constituencies in Lilongwe District. It elects one Member of Parliament by the first past the post system.

The constituency has 12 wards, all electing councilors for the Lilongwe District. In 2009, the member of parliament who represented the constituency was Godfrey Kamanya.

== Members of parliament ==
Elections	MP	Party	Notes	References
2009	Godfrey Kamanya	IND	Multi-party system	
