= Kasungu South Constituency =

Malawian electoral constituency

Kasungu South
- First-past-the-post constituency for the Parliament of Malawi
- District: Kasungu
- Region: Central Region
- Major settlements: Kasungu

Current constituency
- Party: DPP
- Member: Simplex Chithyola Banda

Kasungu South Constituency is a constituency for the National Assembly of Malawi, located in the Kasungu District of Malawi's Central Region.

It is one of several constituencies in Kasungu District. It elects one Member of Parliament by the first past the post system. The constituency has multiple wards, all electing councilors for the Kasungu District Council. The constituency is currently represented by MP Simplex Chithyola Banda of the DPP.

== Members of parliament ==
| MP | Party | Notes | References |
|---|---|---|---|
| 2019 | Simplex Chithyola Banda | DPP | Multi-party system |
