= Patricia Mkanda =

Malawian politician

Patricia Omega Chikanda Mkanda is a Malawian civil servant and politician. From 2014 to 2019 she was a Malawi Congress Party member of parliament, representing the Lilongwe North Constituency.

== Life ==
Patricia Mkanda was born at Dzenza Mission Hospital in Lilongwe, the youngest of eight children. Working for the Malawian civil service, she gained a degree in human resource management and later a masters in business administration. She was secretary for the Health Service Commission when she left the civil service.

In the 2014 Malawian general election Mkanda was elected member of parliament for the Lilongwe North constituency. She gained 36,437 votes, 69.36% of all votes cast.

In 2019 she lost her parliamentary seat to Monica Chang’anamuno, who ran against her as an independent. Chang’anamuno received 21,361 votes. Mkanda came second with 14,476 votes.

She is married to Charles Mkanda, with six children.
