= Lilongwe City West Constituency =

Malawian electoral constituency

- First-past-the-post constituency for the Parliament of Malawi
- District: Lilongwe
- Region: Central Region

Current constituency
- Party: DPP
- Member: Edwin Bhagwanji

Lilongwe City West Constituency is a constituency for the National Assembly of Malawi, located in the Lilongwe District of Malawi's Central Region. It is one of 22 constituencies in Lilongwe District and elects one Member of Parliament through the first past the post system. The constituency is composed of 4 wards, each of which elects councilors to the Lilongwe District. In 2009, the member of parliament who represented the constituency was Edwin Bhagwanji.

== Members of parliament ==
| Elections | MP | Party | Notes | References |
|---|---|---|---|---|
| 2009 | Edwin Bhagwanji | DPP | Multi-party system | |
