= Mzimba West Constituency =

Malawian electoral constituency

- First-past-the-post constituency for the Parliament of Malawi
- District: Mzimba
- Region: Northern Region

Current constituency
- Party: MCP
- Member(s): Khumbize Kandodo Chiponda

Mzimba West Constituency is a constituency for the National Assembly of Malawi, located in the Mzimba District of Malawi's Northern Region. It is one of 12 constituencies in Mzimba District that elects one Member of Parliament by the first past the post system. The constituency has 10 wards, all electing councilors for the Mzimba District.

Loveness Gondwe was MP and Malawi's deputy speaker in 2004. She stood and was declared the winner of the Mziba West constituency election in May 2004 by the Malawi Electoral Commission. There had been six candidates and Catherine Nyahara came second. Nyahara appealled citing severali rregulaties in the election by Gondwe her supporters and her husband. The judge disregarded several points but agreed that the election should be re-run. In 2005 Gongdwe and the MEC went again to the Supreme Court to appeal the first judge's decision. The Supreme Court came to the conclusion that Gondwe's initial victory was correct and her and the MEC's appeal was proven. Nyahara was ordered to pay costs.

The constituency was represented by Malawi Congress Party MP, Khumbize Kandodo Chiponda in 2019.

== Members of parliament ==
Elections	MP	Party	Notes	References
1999	Goodall Gondwe	MCP	Multi-party system	
2004	Loveness Gondwe		Multi-party system	
2019	Khumbize Kandodo Chiponda	MCP	Multi-party system	
