= Mzimba South Constituency =

Malawian electoral constituency

- First-past-the-post constituency for the Parliament of Malawi
- District: Mzimba
- Region: Northern Region

Current constituency
- Party: Malawi Congress Party
- Member: Emmanuel Chambulanyina Jere

Mzimba South Constituency is a constituency for the National Assembly of Malawi, located in the Mzimba District of Malawi's Northern Region. It is one of 12 constituencies in Mzimba District that elects one Member of Parliament by the first past the post system. The constituency has 7 wards, all electing councilors for the Mzimba District. The constituency is currently represented by Malawi Congress Party MP, Emmanuel Chambulanyina Jere.

== Members of parliament ==
Elections	MP	Party	Notes	References
	Benjamin Banda	MCP	Multi-party system	
2019	Emmanuel Chambulanyina Jere	MCP	Multi-party system	
2025	Emmanuel Chambulanyina Jere	MCP	Multi-party system	
