= 1987 general election =

1987 general election may refer to:

- 1987 Belgian general election
- 1987 Ethiopian general election
- 1987 Fijian general election
- 1987 Gambian general election
- 1987 Irish general election
- 1987 Italian general election
- 1987 Malawian general election
- 1987 Maltese general election
- 1987 Mauritian general election
- 1987 Montserratian general election
- 1987 New Zealand general election
- 1987 Papua New Guinean general election
- 1987 South African general election
- 1987 Tongan general election
- 1987 Turkish general election
- 1987 United Kingdom general election
- 1987 Vanuatuan general election
