= Mzimba Central Constituency =

Malawian electoral constituency

- First-past-the-post constituency for the Parliament of Malawi
- District: Mzimba
- Region: Northern Region

Current constituency
- Party: DPP
- Member(s): Donton Samuel Job Mkandawire

Mzimba Central Constituency is a constituency for the National Assembly of Malawi, located in the Mzimba District of Malawi's Northern Region. It is one of 13 constituencies in Mzimba District. It elects one Member of Parliament by the first past the post system. The constituency has 12 wards, all electing councilors for the Mzimba District. In 2009, the constituency was represented by MP, Donton Samuel Job Mkandawire.

== Members of parliament ==
Elections	MP	Party	Notes	References
2009	Donton Samuel Job Mkandawire	DPP	Multi-party system	
