= Steve Mikaya =

Malawian politician

Honorable Steve Mikaya

Elected member of the National Assembly of Malawi
- In office 2019–2024
- Constituency: Blantyre West (constituency)

Personal details
- Born: Steve Mikaya Malawi
- Party: United Transformation Movement

Steve Mikaya is a Malawian Member of Parliament in the National Assembly of Malawi. He was elected to the position in 2019. Previously, he was a governor in the Southern Region.

== Career ==
He was elected Member of Parliament for Blantyre City West in 2019 as a member of the United Transformation Movement political party.

== Personal life ==
Mikaya lives in Blantyre and is married.
