= Esther Kathumba =

Malawian politician

- Occupation: politician
- Known for: Kathumba v. President of Malawi
- Political party: independent

Esther Kathumba is a Malawian politician who became the MP for Lilongwe Mapuyu South in 2019. She led the "Kathumba v. President of Malawi" case during the COVID-19 pandemic - arguing that the President was exceeding his powers.

== Life ==
Kathumba was one of the 13 independent women MPs elected in 2019. She became the independent MP for Lilongwe Mapuyu South in 2019 when she defeated the sitting member. After the election she was asked to align herself with the DPP so they could form a government but she refused.

In April 2020 she and fellow Lilongwe MP Monica Chang'anamuno went to court over the legality of the measures brought in by the President to deal with the COVID-19 pandemic because they were not constitutional. They brought the "Kathumba v. President of Malawi" case with the Human Rights Defenders Coalition and the Church and Society Program of the Livingstonia Synod of the Church of Central Africa Presbyterian. Kathumba argued that the President's declaration of a State of National Disaster in March and the announcement by the Minister of Health of a three week lockdown (a few days before) was unconstitutional. Three judges agreed with Kathumba that the measures were outside the constitution because they were a significant change to the freedoms given by the constitution and because the President has not declared "a State of Emergency". Moreover they volunteered that the freedom of conscience, belief, thought and religion can never be derogated.

In 2024 she proposed that parliament should change the law to allow President Chakwera to exceed the two-term maximum service and that he should be made President-for-life. The Malawi Congress Party were swift to disown the proposal which one commentator called immature. The Centre for Human Rights and Rehabilitation warned that the proposal endangered democracy. The President said that he had no intention to serve beyond two terms.
