= Zomba District =

District of Malawi

Coordinates: 15°10′S 35°30′E

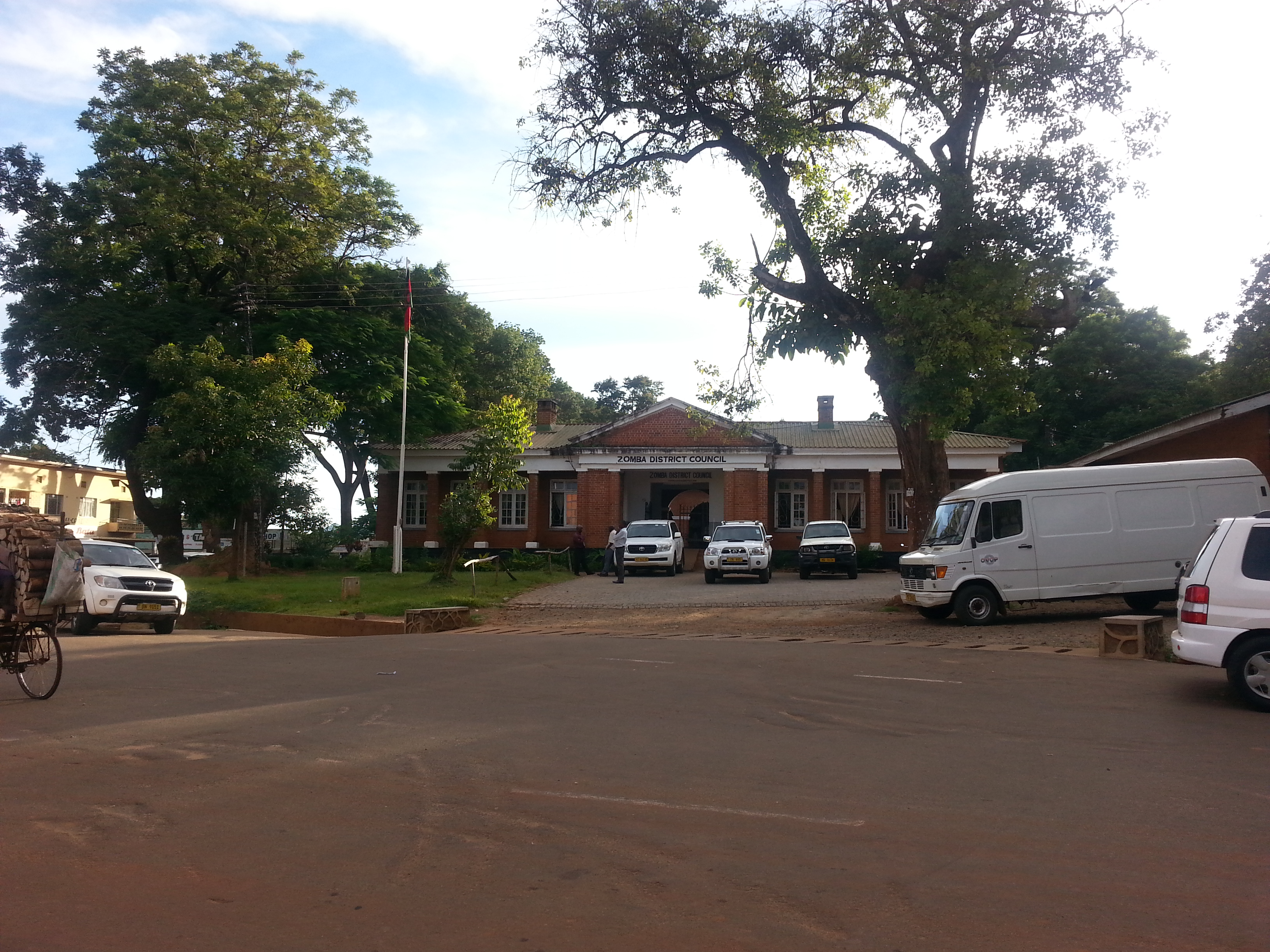
- Zomba District Council

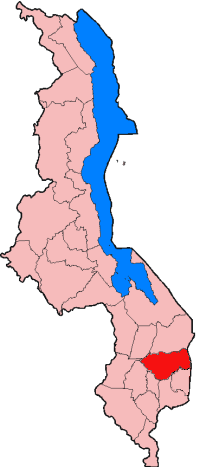
- Location of Zomba District in Malawi
- Country: Malawi
- Region: Southern
- Seat: Zomba

Area
  - Land: 2,363 km^{2} (912 sq mi)

Population (2018)
  - Total: 746,724

Zomba District is one of twelve districts in the Southern Region of Malawi, surrounded by the districts of Chiradzulu, Blantyre, Mulanje, Phalombe, Machinga, Balaka and the Republic of Mozambique to the east. The total land area is 2,363 km^{2}, representing three percent of the total land area of Malawi. The capital is Zomba.

== Geography ==
Zomba District is bounded on the north by Machinga District, on the east by Mozambique, and on the south by Phalombe, Mulanje, and Chiradzulu districts, on the southwest by Blantyre district, and on the northeast by Balaka District.

The Shire River forms the northwestern boundary of the district, and the northwestern portion of the district lies in the Shire River Valley, a portion of the East African Rift. The Shire Highlands run from north to south through the district, including the Zomba Plateau. The highlands form the divide between the Shire River basin and the basin of Lake Chilwa. The Phalombe Plain lies east of the highlands and west and south of Lake Chilwa. The central and eastern portions of the district lie in the closed basin of Lake Chilwa, and several small rivers drain from the surrounding highlands into the lake. The Domasi River forms part of the northern boundary of the district. The Phalombe River and its tributary the Namadzi form the southern boundary of the district, separating it from Phalombe, Mulanje, and Chiradzulu districts. The Likangala River and its tributary the Thondwe River drain the central portion of the district eastwards into lake Chilwa. Lake Chilwa's extent varies with rainfall and evaporation, and the lake is surrounded by broad seasonal wetlands.

== Demographics ==
The district has a total population of 746,724 (2018) resulting in a population density of 316 persons per km^{2}, more than half (52.6%) of whom are 18 years or younger. The annual population growth rate over the last decade was two percent. Chinyanja is the native language spoken by most of the inhabitants, although other languages like Chiyao and Chilomwe are also spoken. The two dominant religions are Christianity (78%) and Islam (20%).

=== Ethnic groups ===
At the time of the 2018 Census of Malawi, the distribution of the population of Zomba District by ethnic group was as follows:

- 23.1% Lomwe
- 57.3% Yao
- 21.7% Nyanja
- 5.8% Chewa
- 3.6% Mang'anja
- 2.1% Ngoni
- 0.6% Sena
- 0.3% Tumbuka
- 0.1% Tonga
- 0.0% Nkhonde
- 0.0% Lambya
- 0.0% Sukwa
- 0.3% Others

== Government and administrative divisions ==
There are ten National Assembly constituencies in Zomba:

1. Zomba Central
2. Zomba Changalume
3. Zomba Chingale
4. Zomba Chisi
5. Zomba Likangala
6. Zomba Lisanjala
7. Zomba Msondole
8. Zomba Mtonya
9. Zomba Malosa
10. Zomba Thondwe

Since the 2009 election all of these constituencies have been held by members of the Democratic Progressive Party.

- Zomba City (administrative capital)

== Economics ==
The economy of Zomba District is dominated by agriculture, where individual maize production accounts for the main activity, while tobacco is cultivated as the main cash crop. Other crops produced include rice, cassava, sweet potato, groundnuts, beans and pigeon peas. Husbandry is still underdeveloped; nevertheless cattle, poultry, goats, sheep, pigs and rabbits are raised for meat production in Zomba, with poultry being the most common. Zomba on the other hand is one of the few districts with well-spread pond-fishing. There are around 2,600 farmers engaged in aquaculture, operating more than 5,000 ponds and producing as much as 757 tonnes of fish annually. In addition, Lake Chilwa continues to be the main source of fish in the district, with an annual catchment of more than 5,000 tonnes.

Small and medium-scale businesses dominate the district's non agro-based economy, with general retail accounting for the gross of sales. Employment has increased to almost 97% of the total adult (15+) population, resulting in historically low unemployment. Services, general labour, and professional and technical groups are the dominant occupation groups.

== Ecology ==
The district extends across four ecoregions. The Zambezian and mopane woodlands occupy the warm, dry valley of the Shire River in the northeast of the district. The South Malawi montane forest-grassland mosaic covers the cooler and moister Shire Highlands. Zambezian and mopane woodlands and Eastern miombo woodlands extend across the Phalombe Plain. Zambezian flooded grasslands surround Lake Chilwa.

Most of the district's native forests have been cleared for agriculture or plantations of introduced pines (Pinus patula) and eucalyptus.

== Tourism ==
Tourism plays an increasing role in the district's economy. Attractions include the Zomba Plateau and Lake Chilwa, historical relics and the natural environment of the district.

== Health ==
Health services are provided mainly at health posts, clinics, health centres and hospitals. In addition, many people get medical treatment from traditional practitioners and traditional birth attendants. The crude birth rate for the district is estimated at 48.1 births per 1,000 Inhabitants. The total fertility rate stands at 5.3 children per woman. The infant mortality rate is 84 deaths per 1,000 live births and child mortality (14.4%) is among the highest in the country.

== Infrastructure ==
Almost four-fifths of all households (79.6%) have access to safe drinking water, while access to sanitation facilities is still at 59%. Methods of refuse disposal include burning, dust bins, rubbish pits, random littering and, mainly for organic waste, integrating into garden and composite pits.

== Education ==
Education in Zomba District is offered from pre-school, primary, secondary and tertiary levels to adult literacy classes and vocational training. The services are provided by the government, religious institutions and private individuals. The district has experienced a sharp increase in school enrolment. Primary school net enrolment is currently at 87.2% against the country rate of 80.0%. However, the education sector in Zomba at all levels continues to face a number of challenges, including teacher qualification, shortages in the total number of teacher and student accommodations, lack of or dilapidated classrooms and lack of teaching materials.

== Transportation ==
Zomba District is comparatively well connected. The main road passing through the district is the M3 road (Blantyre-Zomba-Lilongwe). The Zomba Phalombe road is under construction. Earth roads comprise many of the other types of roads connecting different places within the district. Bicycles and matola (hitch-hiking) are the most common means of transport, followed by regular buses and minibuses.

== Notable people ==
- Harriet Boniface was the first Malawian judoka to qualify for the Olympic Games and her home village was Chikowi in Zomba District.
