= Emily Phiri =

Malawian politician

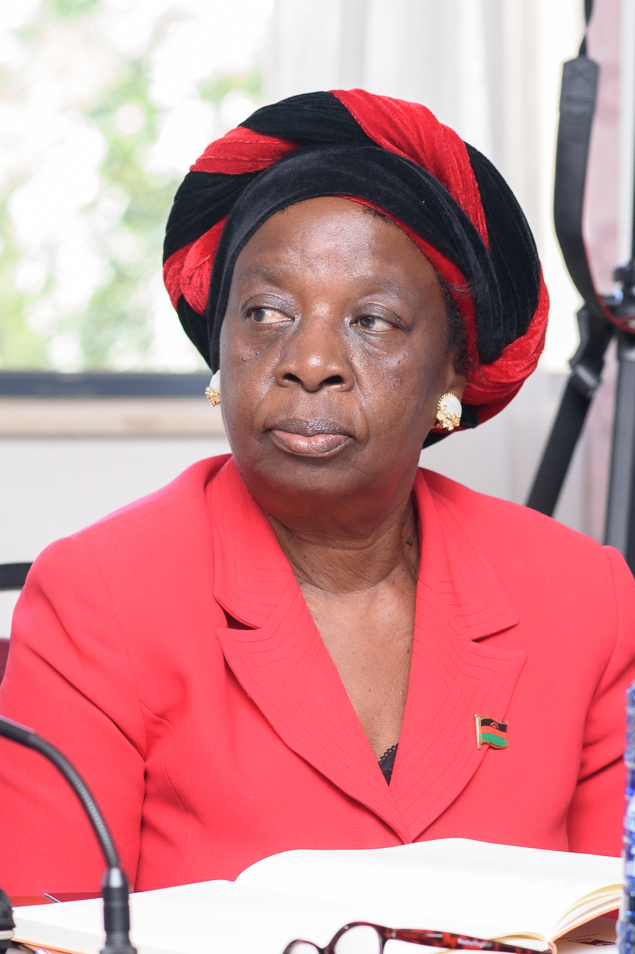
- in 2026
- Other name: Emily Chinthu Phiri
- Occupations: social worker and politician
- Known for: She represents the Nkhata Bay South Constituency
- Predecessor: Ken Zikhale Ng'oma
- Political party: United Transformation Movement (UTM)

Emily Phiri or Emily Chinthu Phiri is a Malawian politician for the United Transformation Movement. She represents the Nkhata Bay South Constituency in the National Assembly.

== Life ==
Phiri was a social worker who was supported by her local newspaper before she turned to politics. She is a member of Rotary International and continued to consider herself a social worker.

Phiri was Nkhata Bay South Constituency's MP in 2014.

In 2019 she came second in that year's election. The seat was won by Kenneth Zikhale Reeves Ng'Oma of the Malawi Congress Party. In 2019 she visited Norway as a guest of Ola Grønn Hagen who is a Norwegian working in Malawi. She visited the local Rotary and met friends of Malawi in Tynset Municipality.

Phiri was promoted to be the Political Affairs Director when Dalitso Kabambe took over the Presidency of the UTM party in 2024 after the death of its leader.

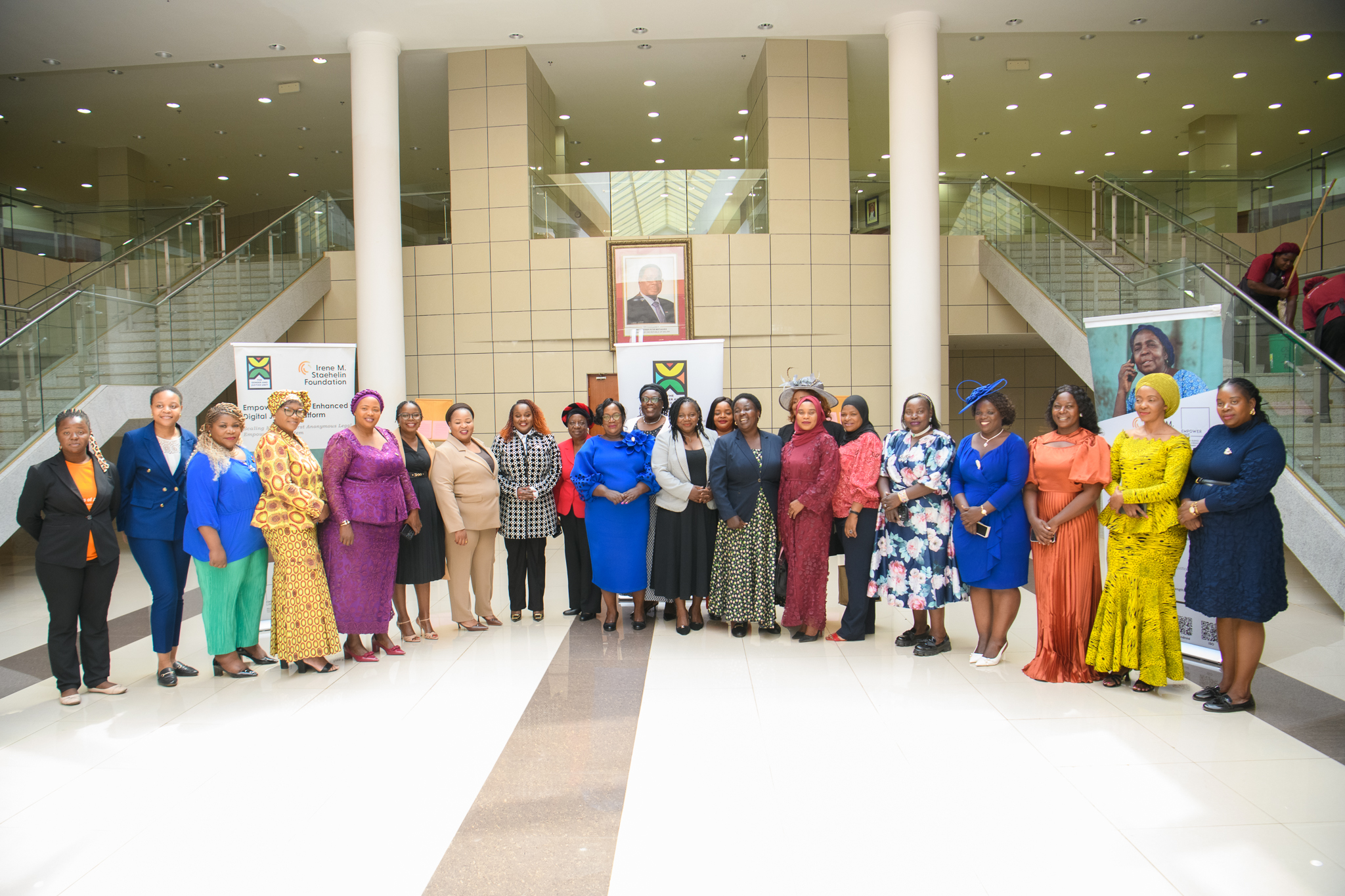
Phiri (9th from left) with the Malawi Parliamentary Women's Caucus in 2026

In the 2025 election she beat the former minister of Mining Ken Zikhale Ng'oma. He got less than 2,000 votes and she got over 3,600 to again lead the Nkhata Bay South Constituency for the UTM Party. She was chosen as the vice-President of the Parliamentary committee in November 2025 that looks at the budget. She and the President, Sosten Gwengwe, could serve until 2030.
