= Mzimba South West Constituency =

Malawian electoral constituency

- First-past-the-post constituency for the Parliament of Malawi
- District: Mzimba
- Region: Northern Region
- Major settlements: Ekwendeni

Current constituency
- Party: MCP
- Member(s): Khumbo Hastings Kachali

Mzimba North East Constituency is a constituency for the National Assembly of Malawi, located in the Mzimba District of Malawi's Northern Region. It is one of 12 constituencies in Mzimba District. It elects one Member of Parliament by the first past the post system. The constituency has 19 wards, all electing councilors for the Mzimba District. The constituency is currently represented by MP, Khumbo Hastings Kachali.

== Members of parliament ==
Elections	MP	Party	Notes	References
2009	Khumbo Hastings Kachali	DPP	Multi-party system	
