= Tailos Bakili =

Malawian politician

Member of the National Assembly of Malawi for Machinga North East Constituency
- Incumbent
- Assumed office 29 October 2025

Personal details
- Party: Independent

Tailos Bakili is a Malawian politician who has served as a member of the National Assembly of Malawi since 2025 for Machinga North East. He is also a former radio personality under the name Tai B. He won election to Mpiri Ward council in 2014 and later council Chairperson for Machinga District Council.
