= Lilongwe Mapuyu South Constituency =

Malawian electoral constituency

- First-past-the-post constituency for the Parliament of Malawi
- District: Lilongwe
- Region: Central Region

Current constituency
- Party: Independent
- Member(s): Esther Kathumba

Lilongwe Mapuyu South Constituency is a constituency for the National Assembly of Malawi, located in the Lilongwe District of Malawi's Central Region. It is one of 22 constituencies in Lilongwe District. It elects one Member of Parliament by the first past the post system.

The constituency has 11 wards, all electing councilors for the Lilongwe District. In 2009, the member of parliament who represented the constituency was Joseph Njovuyalema.

== Members of parliament ==
Elections	MP	Party	Notes	References
2009	Joseph Njovuyalema	MCP	Multi-party system	
2019	Esther Kathumba	Independent	Multi-party system	
