= Mzimba South East Constituency =

Malawian electoral constituency

- First-past-the-post constituency for the Parliament of Malawi
- District: Mzimba
- Region: Northern Region

Current constituency
- Party: MCP
- Member(s): Rabson Chihaula Shaba

Mzimba South East Constituency is a constituency for the National Assembly of Malawi, located in the Mzimba District of Malawi's Northern Region. It is one of 12 constituencies in Mzimba District. It elects one Member of Parliament by the first past the post system. The constituency has 13 wards, all electing councilors for the Mzimba District. The constituency is currently represented by MP, Rabson Chihaula Shaba.

== Members of parliament ==
Elections	MP	Party	Notes	References
2009	Rabson Chihaula Shaba	DPP	Multi-party system	
