= Zomba Chisi Constituency =

Malawian electoral constituency

- First-past-the-post constituency for the Parliament of Malawi
- District: Zomba
- Region: Southern Region

Current constituency
- Party: DPP
- Member(s): Peter Chizalo Mangulenje

Zomba Chisi Constituency is a constituency for the National Assembly of Malawi, located in the Zomba District of Malawi's Southern Region. It is one of the 10 constituencies in the district that elects one member of parliament by the first past the post system.

The constituency has several wards, all electing councilors for the Zomba District. In 2009, the member of parliament who represented the constituency was Peter Chizalo Mangulenje.

== Members of parliament ==
Elections	MP	Party	Notes	References
2009	Peter Chizalo Mangulenje	IND	Multi-party system	
