= 1971 Malawian general election =

← 1964	17 April 1971	1976 →

All 64 seats in the National Assembly 34 seats needed for a majority
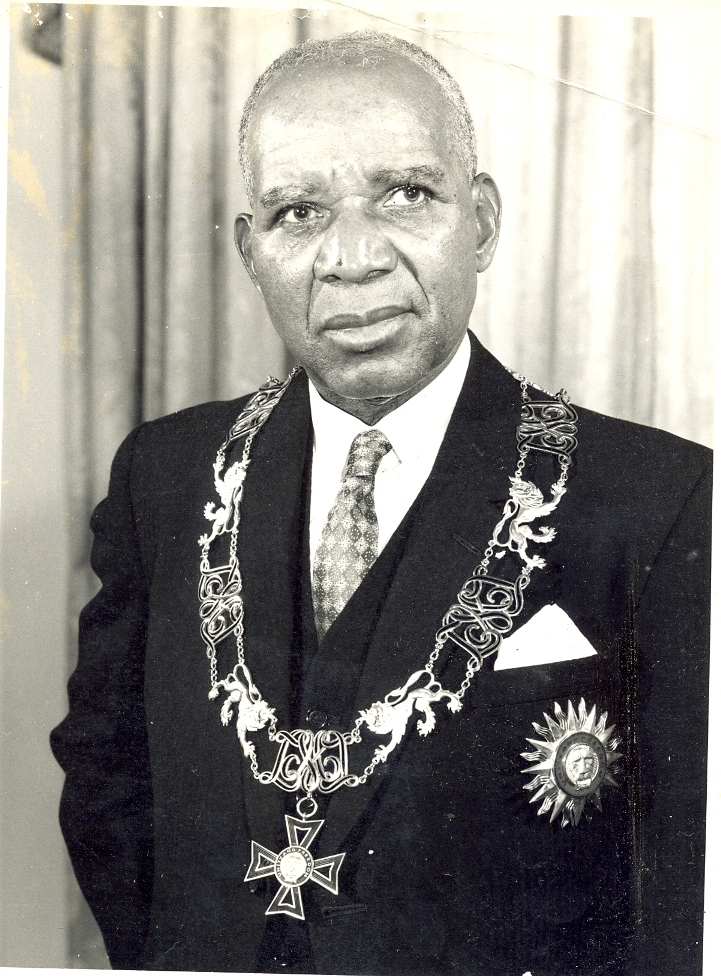
	First party
Leader	Hastings Banda
Party	MCP
Last election	50
Seats won	56
Seat change	▲6
- Results by constituency

General elections were due to be held in Malawi on 17 April 1971, the first since the pre-independence elections in 1964. The Malawi Congress Party had been the only legally permitted party in the country since 1966. Each of the 60 constituencies had three to five candidates nominated by party committees. The committees then submitted the candidates' names to President Hastings Banda, who selected a single candidate for each seat. All prospective candidates had to declare their allegiance to Banda before being allowed to stand.

As there was only one candidate for each constituency, no voting actually took place on election day, and the candidates selected by Banda were elected unopposed. However, only 56 of the seats were filled, and following the election, Banda nominated another eight members to the National Assembly.

== Results ==
Party	Seats	+/–
Malawi Congress Party	56	+6
Appointed members	8	New
Vacant	4	–
Total	68	+15
Source: African Elections Database, IPU

== Aftermath ==
In July, two months after the elections and five years to the day that Malawi had become a republic, the National Assembly declared Banda president for life. However, according to a Central Intelligence Agency handbook, this move merely codified a state of affairs that had existed since 1966, as Banda would have been the only candidate for president at elections due later in 1971.
