= Jean Muonawauza Sendeza =

Malawian politician

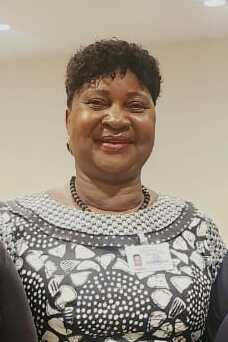
- in June 2026

Minister of Gender of Malawi
- In office January 31, 2023 – 2025
- President: Lazarus Chakwera
- Succeeded by: Mary Navicha

Personal details
- Born: Malawi
- Party: Malawi Congress Party

Jean Muonawauza Sendeza is a Malawian politician and educator. She was the Minister of Homeland Security until she became the Minister of Gender in 2023. She lost her seat in the 2025 Malawian general election.

== Life ==
Sendeza was first elected in 2009. She represents the Lilongwe South West constituency for the Malawi Congress Party. She is a member of Malawi Parliamentary Women's Caucus.

Sendeza was the Homeland Security Minister in June 2022 when she ordered an investigation into the smuggling of phones into prisons. She wanted the criminal activities of prison officers involved to be stopped and she demanded a report in seven days. Wandika Phiri who was in charge of the prisons stated that all holes would be sealed.

She became the current Minister of Gender of Malawi, having been appointed to the position in early January 2023 by the current president of Malawi Lazarus Chakwera. Her term began on January 31, 2023.

She stood in the 2025 Malawian general election to represent the Lilongwe South West Constituency and lost her seat.

Awards and achievements
Preceded by Patricia Kaliati	Minister of Gender of Malawi; 2023-2025	Succeeded by Mary Navicha
