= 1978 Malawian general election =

- 29 June 1978

All 102 seats in the National Assembly 51 seats needed for a majority
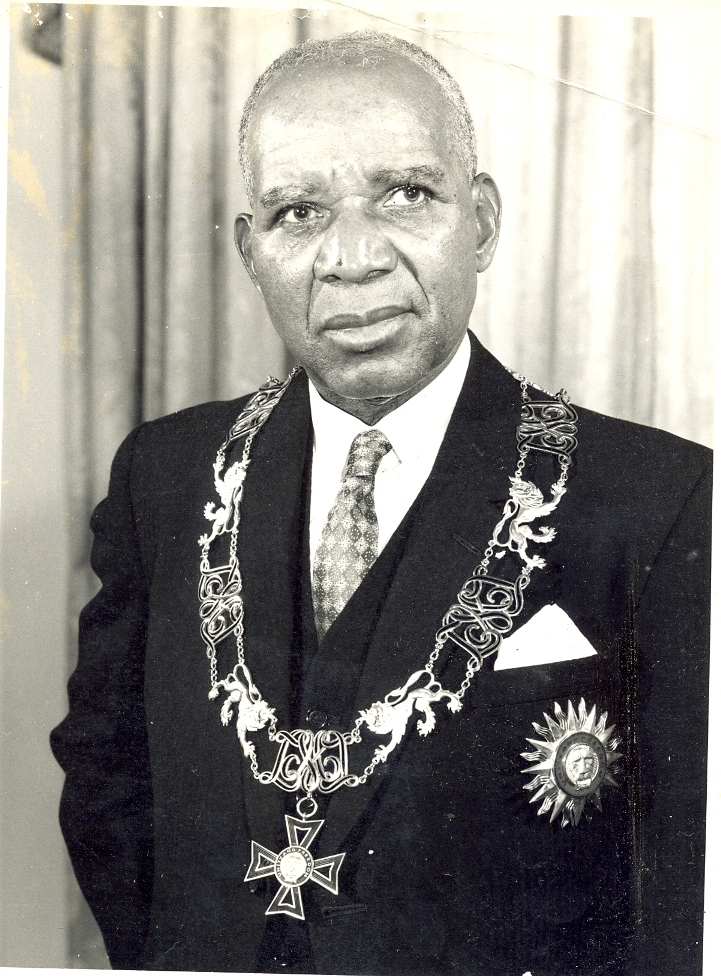
	First party
Leader	Hastings Banda
Party	MCP
Last election	70
Seats won	87
Seat change	▲17

General elections were held in Malawi on 29 June 1978. As the country had become a one-party state in 1966, the Malawi Congress Party (MCP) was the sole legal party at the time. However, unlike the two previous elections, in which MCP leader and president for life Hastings Banda had selected a single candidate for each constituency, there was more than one nominated candidate in 47 of the 87 constituencies. As a result, voting took place on election day for the first time since the 1961 elections in what was then the British protectorate of Nyasaland.

All prospective candidates were vetted by Banda after being nominated by MCP committees, and had to declare their allegiance to Banda in order to be allowed to stand. Candidates ran unopposed in 33 of the remaining seats, and seven were left vacant as the candidates failed the English proficiency test. Of the estimated 3,000,000 registered voters, around 371,000 cast votes.

== Results ==
Party	Seats	+/–
Malawi Congress Party	87	+17
Appointed members	15	0
Total	102	+17
Source: African Elections Database, IPU
