= 1976 Malawian general election =

- 24 May 1976

All 85 seats in the National Assembly 43 seats needed for a majority
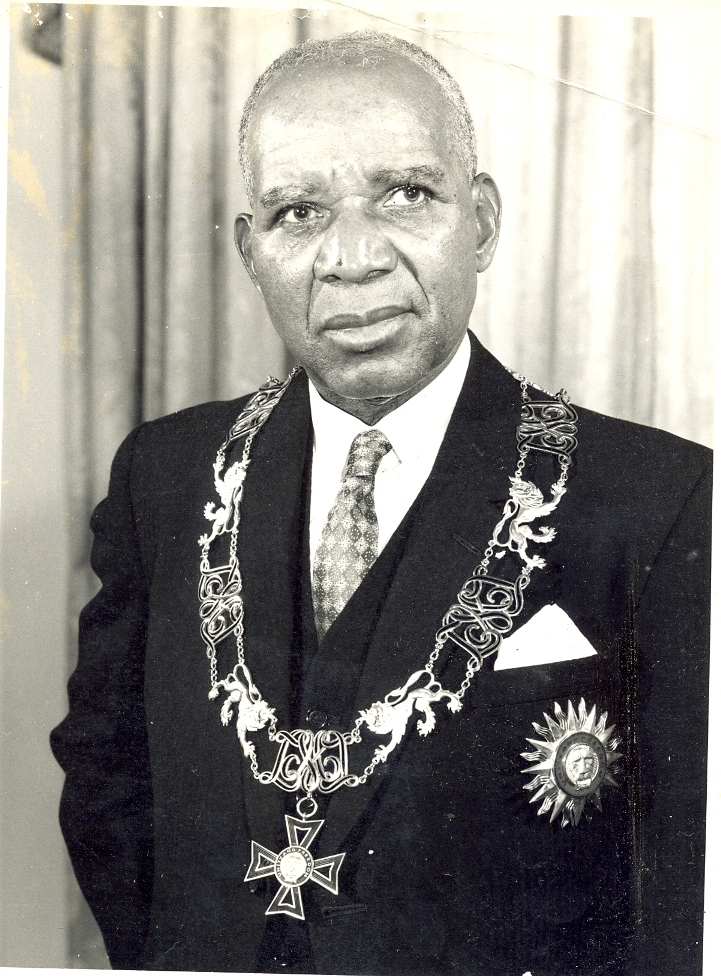
	First party
Leader	Hastings Banda
Party	MCP
Last election	56
Seats won	70
Seat change	▲14
- Results by constituency

General elections were due to be held in Malawi on 24 May 1976. They were the first to be held after President Hastings Banda became president for life in 1971.

Banda's Malawi Congress Party had been the only legally permitted party since 1966. Each of the 70 constituencies had a maximum of five candidates proposed by at least two registered voters and nominated by MCP committees. All prospective candidates had to declare their allegiance to Banda in order to stand. These candidates' names were then submitted to Banda, who personally vetted the prospective candidates before selecting a single candidate for each constituency. As a result, no voting took place on election day and all 70 candidates were returned unopposed.

Following the elections, Banda nominated another 15 members to the National Assembly.

== Results ==
Party	Seats	+/–
Malawi Congress Party	70	+14
Appointed members	15	–
Total	85	+17
Source: IPU
