= Monica Chang'anamuno =

Politician in Malawi

- Born: Monica Chang’anamuno; 1980 (age 45–46); Lilongwe, Malawi
- Occupations: Educator; Activist; politician

Monica Amon Chang’anamuno (born 1980) is a Malawian politician and educator who has been the Minister of Mining and the Minister of Defence in Malawi. She is a Member of Parliament for Lilongwe North Constituency. She was re-elected in 2025.

== Life ==
Chang'anamuno was born in Lilongwe in 1980. In 2011 she enrolled on a Master of Arts course in Organizational Leadership at the Africa International University which is in Nairobi. She graduated in 2014.

Chang'anamuno became a Member of Parliament for her own home of Lilongwe North Constituency in 2019 and she became the Minister of Mining.

In April 2020, she and fellow Lilongwe MP Esther Kathumba went to court over the legality of the measures brought in by the President to deal with the COVID-19 pandemic because they were not constitutional. They brought the "Kathumba v. President of Malawi" case with the Human Rights Defenders Coalition and the Church and Society Program of the Livingstonia Synod of the Church of Central Africa Presbyterian. Kathumba argued that the President's declaration of a State of National Disaster in March and the announcement by the Minister of Health of a three week lockdown (a few days before) was unconstitutional. Three judges agreed with Kathumba that the measures were outside the constitution because they were a significant change to the freedoms given by the constitution and because the President has not declared "a State of Emergency". Moreover they volunteered that the freedom of conscience, belief, thought and religion can never be derogated.

Minister Chang'anamuno welcomed the progress made on open government when Malawi supported Open Government Week for the first time in May 2024. Janet Banda who led the Presidential Delivery Unit noted that there was still work to do. In October 2024 Chang'anamuno unveiled a new mining regulatory authority which was designed to streamline the creation of new investment in Malawi.

In 2025, before that year's election, Chang'anamuno was the Minister of Defence. She made a new agreement with her opposite number, Cristóvão Artur Chume, in the Mozambique government. The aim was to cut down on costs at border crossings and to increase the pressure on smuggling and illegal trades and mining. The agreement, signed in Maputo in June, set out rules that allowed the armed forces of the two nations to organise joint patrols and operations.

In 2025 about half of the country's MP's lost their seats but Chang'anamuno was not one of them.

== Personal life ==
Chang’anamuno was born in 1980 in Lilongwe, Malawi. She attended Lilongwe Secondary School.
