= Mzimba District =

Mzimba
- District
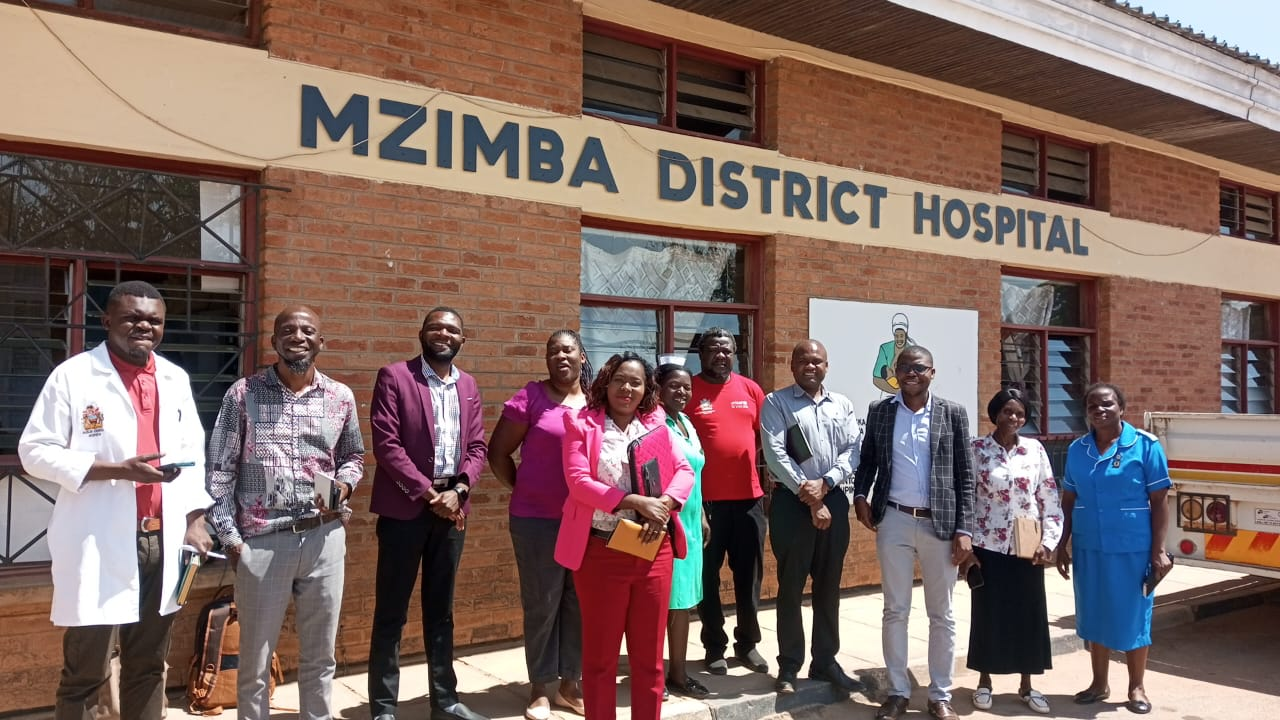
- Mzimba District Hospital - photo by Wells for Zoe

- Location within Malawi
- Coordinates: 11°30′S 33°30′E
- Country: Malawi
- Region: Northern Region
- Capital: Mzimba
- Established: 1908

Government
  - Type: Unitary presidential republic

Area
  - Total: 10,473 km^{2} (4,044 sq mi)

Population (2023)
  - Total: 1,017,701
  - Density: 97.174/km^{2} (251.68/sq mi)

Racial makeup (2023)
  - Black African: 94.1%
  - Asian: 2.6%
  - Mixed: 1.9%
  - White: 1.3%
  - Other: 0.1%

First languages (2018)
  - Chitumbuka: 93.2%
  - Chichewa: 2.8%
  - Yao: 1.5%
  - Lomwe: 1.1%
  - English: 0.2%
  - Other: 1.1%
- Time zone: UTC+2 (CAT)
- ISO 3166 code: MW-MZ

Mzimba (formerly Kathibi, original Chitumbuka name) is a district in the Northern Region of Malawi. The capital is Mzimba and the biggest town is Mzuzu, which is also the administrative headquarters of the Northern Region. The district covers an area of 10,473 km^{2} and has a population of 1,017,701 (2023). It is the largest district in Malawi. The district is inhabited by Tumbuka people. Chitumbuka is the predominant language spoken in the district.

== Geography ==
The district's diverse landscape features the Viphya Mountains that stretch across its southern and eastern regions, while the central area is occupied by the Mzimba Plain. The South Rukuru River and its tributaries flow through the plain, draining into the nearby basin. The district's western border shares a boundary with Zambia, marked by a low divide separating the South Rukuru basin from the Luangwa River basin.

== Government ==
Since 2009, there are twelve National Assembly constituencies in Mzimba:

- Mzimba Central
- Mzimba East
- Mzimba Hora
- Mzimba Luwelezi
- Mzuzu City
- Mzimba North
- Mzimba North East
- Mzimba Solora
- Mzimba South
- Mzimba South East
- Mzimba South West
- Mzimba West

=== Divisions ===
The district is divided into 13 sub-divisions, each with its characteristics. These include Senior Chief Jaravikuba Munthali, Vwaza Marsh Game Reserve, TA Mpherembe, TA Mtwalo, Mzuzu City, TA Chindi, SC Kampingo Sibande, Mzimba Boma, TA M'Mbelwa, TA Mzikubola, TA Mzukuzuku, SC Khosolo Gwaza Jere, and TA Mabulabo.

== Demographics ==
At the time of the 2018 Census of Malawi, the distribution of the population of Mzimba District by ethnic group was as follows: 78.3% Tumbuka, 9.1% Chewa, 6.3% Ngoni, 1.4% Lomwe, 1.1% Yao, 1.0% Tonga, 0.9% Sukwa, 0.4% Lambya, 0.3% Nkhonde, 0.1% Sena, 0.1% Mang'anja, 0.1% Nyanja and 0.8% others.

== Cities in Mzimba District ==
- Mzimba (capital)
- Mzuzu
- Ekwendeni

== Culture ==
The district consists of people of Tumbuka with their cultural dance (Vimbuza) origin. And also, descendants of Ngoni people from South Africa with their Cultural Dance (Ingoma). However, the main language spoken is chiTumbuka. The district headquarters is at Mzimba. It is also the centre of netball in Malawi, Malawi's most successful sport. Most of the players in the national team, including international star Mwayi Kumwenda were born and grew up in Mzimba.

== Notable people ==
- Mwayi Kumwenda (1989–), a netball player for the Malawi national team.
- Goodall Gondwe, former Minister of Finance of Malawi
- Rose Chibambo, Malawian politician
- Jane Chimaliro, a netball player for the Malawi national team.
- Tamika Mkandawire, former professional footballer
- Brighton Munthali, a Malawian professional footballer
- Towera Vinkhumbo, a netball player for the Malawi national team
- Bridget Kumwenda, a netball player for the Malawi national team
- Nyokase Madise a radio broadcaster, producer and journalist
- Anita Chitaya a smallholder farmer, community organiser and climate activist

== Incidents ==
On 10 June 2024, a Malawian Defence Force Dornier 228 carrying Vice-President of Malawi Saulos Chilima, former First Lady Patricia Shanil Muluzi, and seven other occupants, crashed in Chikangawa Forest Reserve in Nkhata Bay District; all on board died in Malawi's deadliest aviation accident.

At the time of the crash, the aircraft and its passengers were en route from Lilongwe to Mzuzu Airport in the Northern Region to attend a funeral.

== See also ==
- Mzuzu
