= Rumphi East Constituency =

Malawian electoral constituency

- First-past-the-post constituency for the Parliament of Malawi
- District: Rumphi
- Region: Northern Region

Current constituency
- Party: AFORD
- Member: Florence Shapiro Khimbi

Rumphi East Constituency is a constituency for the National Assembly of Malawi, located in the Rumphi District of Malawi's Northern Region. It is one of the 3 constituencies in Rumphi District. It elects one Member of Parliament by the first past the post system.

The constituency has several wards, all electing councilors for the Rumphi District. In 2009, the member of parliament who represented the constituency was Albert Doza Thindwa.

In 2025 Florence Shapiro Khimbi took the seat for the AFORD party.

== Members of parliament ==
Elections	MP	Party	Notes	References
2009	Albert G.M. Doza Thindwa	DPP	Multi-party system	
2014	Kamlepo Kalua	People's Party	Multi-party system	
2025	Florence Shapiro Khimbi	AFORD	Multi-party system	
