= Lilongwe East Constituency =

Malawian electoral constituency

- First-past-the-post constituency for the Parliament of Malawi
- District: Lilongwe
- Region: Central Region

Current constituency
- Party: MCP
- Member(s): Ezakiel Peter Ching'oma

Lilongwe East Constituency is a constituency for the National Assembly of Malawi, located in the Lilongwe District of Malawi's Central Region. It is one of 22 constituencies in Lilongwe District. It elects one Member of Parliament by the first past the post system. The constituency has 4 wards, all electing councilors for the Lilongwe District. In 2009, the member of parliament who represented the constituency was Ezakiel Peter Ching'oma.

== Members of parliament ==
Elections	MP	Party	Notes	References
2009	Ezakiel Peter Ching'oma	MCP	Multi-party system	
