= Ministry of Homeland Security (Malawi) =

Government ministry of Togo

- Unduna wa vya chitetezo
- Coat of arms of Malawi

Agency overview
- Formed: 1964
- Jurisdiction: Government of Malawi
- Minister responsible: Ken Zikhale Ng'oma

The Ministry of Homeland Security (Tumbuka: Unduna wa vya chitetezo, Chichewa: Unduna wa za Chitetezo), is a government agency of Malawi.

Ministry of Homeland Security in 2026

The Ministry of Homeland Security is the statewide law enforcement agency and oversees the Malawi Police, Malawi Prison Service, Malawi National Fire and Rescue Services, Malawi Border Police, National Headquarters for the Protection of Children on the Internet, National Authority for Community Safety and the Authority for Witness Protection.

The current (2024) Minister of Homeland Security is Ken Zikhale Ng'oma.

== Agencies ==
- Malawi Police
  - Border Guard
  - Civil Guard
- Malawi Witness Protection Authority
- Urban enforcement system
- National Headquarters for the Protection of Children on the Internet
- National Guard of Malawi
- Malawi Fire and Rescue Services
- Malawi Prison Service

== Unit for Public Inquiries and Complaints ==
The Unit for Public Inquiries and Complaints operates under the aegis of the Internal Audit Division of the Ministry of Homeland Security. It handles complaints from citizens against the Malawi Police, Prison Service, National Fire and Rescue Authority, Authority for the War on Drugs and Alcohol and Division for Licensing and Inspection of Firearms. In accordance with the Internal Audit Law, the main duties of the division are to ensure that audited entities abide by the law and carry out their duties in an efficient, financially sound, corruption-free manner.
