= Zomba Chingale Constituency =

Malawian electoral constituency

- First-past-the-post constituency for the Parliament of Malawi
- District: Zomba
- Region: Southern Region

Current constituency
- Party: DPP
- Member(s): Lonie Phiri Chijere Chirwa

Zomba Chingale Constituency is a constituency for the National Assembly of Malawi, located in the Zomba District of Malawi's Southern Region. It is one of the 10 constituencies in the district that elects one member of parliament by the first past the post system.

The constituency has several wards, all electing councilors for the Zomba District. In 2009, the member of parliament who represented the constituency was Lonie Phiri Chijere Chirwa.

== Members of parliament ==
Elections	MP	Party	Notes	References
2009	Lonie Phiri Chijere Chirwa	DPP	Multi-party system	
