= Florence Shapiro Khimbi =

Malawian politician

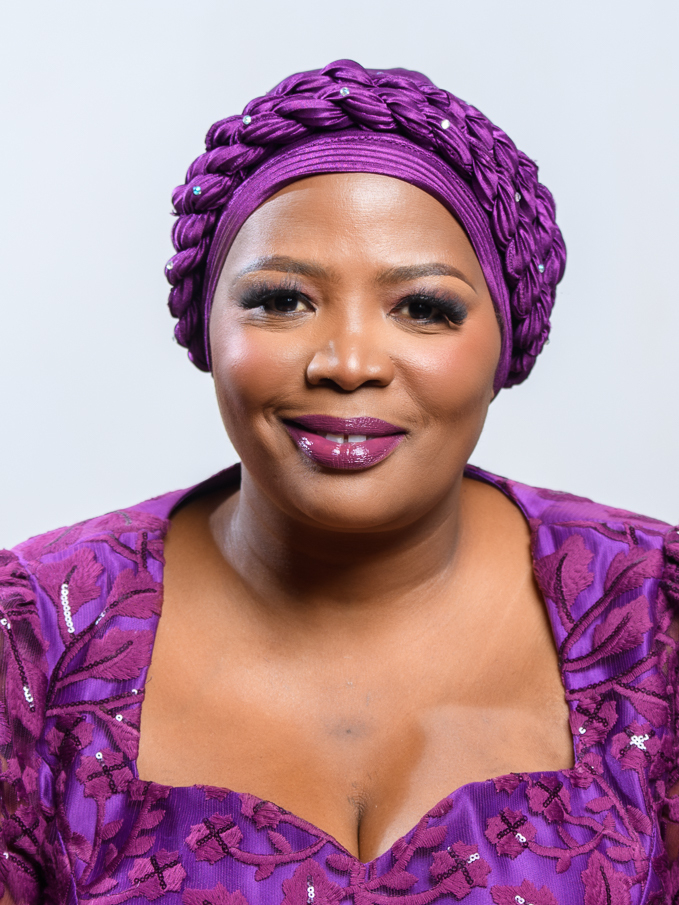
- in 2026
- Occupation: politician
- Political party: AFORD

Florence Shapiro Khimbi is a Malawian politician who was elected in 2025 to the National Assembly. She is a member of the AFORD party and she represents Rumphi East

== Life ==
Khimbi was living in Perth in Australia as a nurse and midwife in 2023. On Christmas Day she donated an ambulance boat to be used around the 156 villages in the constituency where her family live. The condition of the roads is poor. The boat could transport people including pregnant women to assistance or to places where they could proceed further by road. Her family live in the Rumphi East constituency who were to benefit. The boat was handed over by her family to the traditional authority Mwamlowe however the boat is intended to belong to the community and to pay its way by charging for transporting patients.

She joined the AFORD party and stood as a candidate for parliament. She campaigned saying she would break the chain of poverty if elected. Oxfam, the European Union and Worlec were encouraging diversity for the 2025 general election and this included young people, people with disabilities and women.

She won the election taking 35% of the vote and this was announced at the end of September 2025.
