= Zomba Likangala Constituency =

Malawian electoral constituency

- First-past-the-post constituency for the Parliament of Malawi
- District: Zomba
- Region: Southern Region

Current constituency
- Member: Abigail Shariff

Zomba Likangala Constituency is a constituency for the National Assembly of Malawi, located in the Zomba District of Malawi's Southern Region. It is one of the 10 constituencies in the district that elects one member of parliament by the first past the post system.

The constituency has several wards, all electing councilors for the Zomba District. In 2009, the member of parliament who represented the constituency was MacRonald John Table Khwepeya.

== Members of parliament ==
Elections	MP	Party	Notes	References
2009	MacRonald John Table Khwepeya	DPP	Multi-party system	
2019	Abigail Shariff		Multi-party system	
2025	Abigail Shariff	Independent	Multi-party system	
