= Ken Zikhale Ng'oma =

Malawian politician

Minister of Homeland Security of Malawi
- In office 31 January 2023 – 15 September 2025
- President: Lazarus Chakwera

Personal details
- Born: Malawi
- Party: Malawi Congress Party

Ken Zikhale Ng'oma is a Malawian politician and educator. He was the Minister of Homeland Security for Malawi.

== Life ==
Ng'oma won the 2019 election in the Nkhata Bay South Constituency.

He was the Minister of Homeland Security of Malawi, having been appointed to the position in early January 2023 by the current president of Malawi Lazarus Chakwera. His term began on January 31, 2023.

In the 2025 election he got less than 2,000 votes while Emily Phiri took over 3,600 to take the Nkhata Bay South Constituency for the United Transformation Movement.

Awards and achievements
Preceded by	Minister of Homeland Security of Malawi	Succeeded by
