= 1987 Malawian general election =

- 27–28 May 1987

All 123 seats in the National Assembly 62 seats needed for a majority
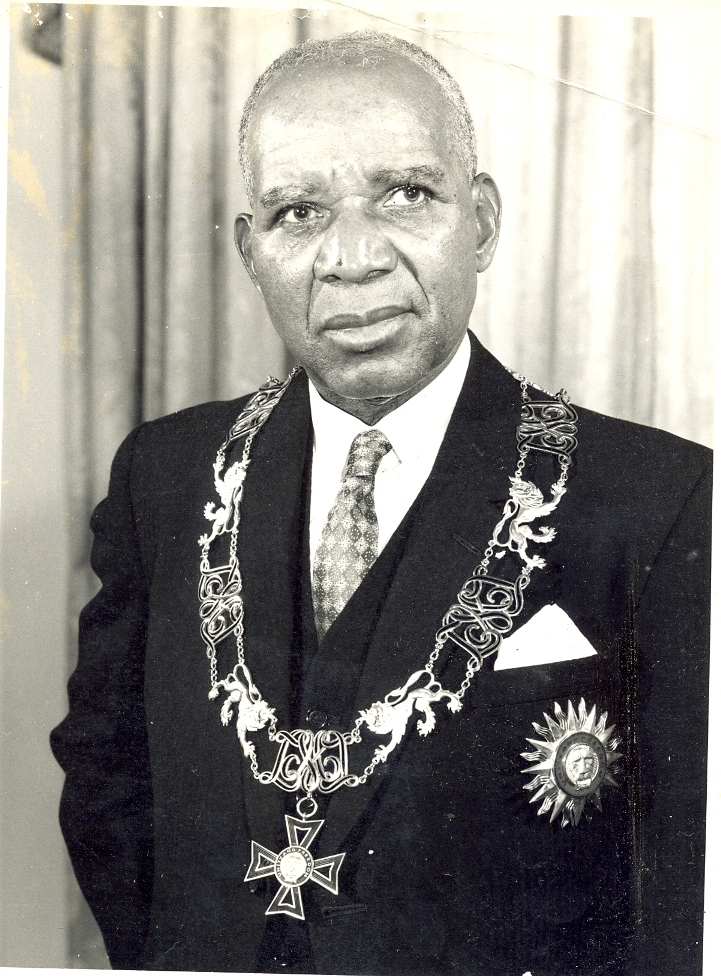
	First party
Leader	Hastings Banda
Party	MCP
Last election	101
Seats won	112
Seat change	▲11

General elections were held in Malawi on 27 and 28 May 1987. As the country had become a one-party state in 1966, the Malawi Congress Party was the sole legal party at the time. The number of seats in the National Assembly was increased to 112, whilst president for life Hastings Banda was able to appoint as many additional members as he saw fit to "enhance the representative character of the Assembly, or to represent particular minority or other special interests in the Republic."

In total over 200 candidates contested the seats, although in 38 there was only a single MCP candidate, who was elected unopposed. In the remaining 80 seats there were between two and five candidates, all of which were from the MCP. Banda appointed a further 11 members. All prospective candidates were vetted by Banda after being nominated by MCP committees, and had to declare their allegiance to Banda in order to be allowed to stand.

== Results ==
Party	Votes	%	Seats	+/–
Malawi Congress Party			112	+11
Appointed members			11	0
Total			123	+11
Registered voters/turnout	3,278,907	–		
Source: African Elections Database, IPU
