= Donton Samuel Mkandawire =

Malawian politician (died 2011)

Donton Samuel Mkandawire (died 24 December 2011) was a Malawian politician, educator, diplomat, and former Minister of Education and Member of Parliament for the Mzimba Central seat in the Mzimba District.

== Biography ==
He studied for a Bachelor of Education degree at Kingswood Methodist College at the University of Western Australia under a Nyasaland State Scholarship. As an educator, he is a professor at the University of Namibia. Mkandawire was head of Malawi Examinations Board (Maneb) and Malawi Institute of Education. In 1988, there was a scandal at Maneb where 10 northerners were removed for allegedly conspiring to influence the Malawi Certificate of Education school exams with Mkandawire who was the head of the board and also from the northern region. There was no evidence of this allegation, but northerners were not on the Maneb board for several years after. Mkandawire was assigned a diplomatic post to Kenya at the same time, but did not take this post but instead fled the country.

Mkandawire was a member of the United Democratic Front (UDF) under the Bakili Muluzi administration. He was also the Minister of education. In 2009, he switched parties to Democratic Progressive Party (DPP) and was Chief Executive Officer of Lilongwe City Assembly. He later ran and won the seat of MP for Mzimba. He died on 24 December 2011 at Mwaiwathu Hospital in Blantyre from cancer.

== Books ==
- Application of a decision theory model to evaluate selection tests, 1975
