= Madalitso Wirima Kambauwa =

Malawian politician

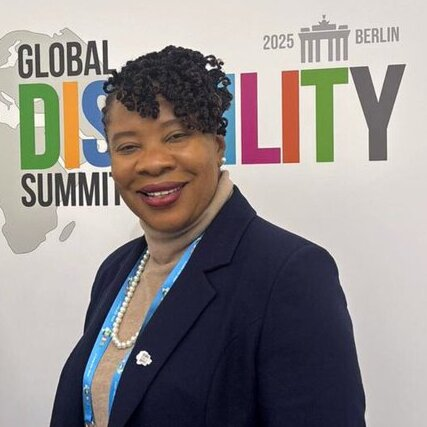
- in 2025 in Berlin

Minister of Education of Malawi
- Incumbent
- Assumed office January 31, 2023
- President: Lazarus Chakwera
- Succeeded by: Bright Msaka

Personal details
- Born: Malawi
- Party: Malawi Congress Party

Madalitso Wirima Kambauwa is a Malawian politician and educator. She has been the MP for the Kasungu North-East Constituency and she became the Minister of Education. She was re-elected in 2025 as the MCP candidate.

== Life ==
Wirima graduated in Business Administration from Temple University in Philadelphia and became a Member of Parliament.

In 2021 she was the deputy Minister of Education. In 2022 Lobin C. Lowe, and Kambauwa, were fired as minister and deputy minister for agriculture by the President. They had paid for a large quantity of fertiliser without the required checks. In 2024 an investigation by the ombudsman.Grace Malera recommended the prosecution of the involved public officials,

She was made the Minister of Education of Malawi, by president Lazarus Chakwera. Her term began on January 31, 2023. She became a member of President Chakwera's cabinet and her deputy minister was named as Nancy Chaola Mdooko. She welcome a scheme that involved nine schools who were chosen to receive HD TVs and tablets as part of an initiative by Airtel Malawi and UNICEF. The scheme included internet access and free use of five educational sites.

Wirima opened a renamed Institute of Continuing Education in Blantyre noting that education was the key to Malawi's ambitions. In February 2024 the Minister chose the primary school in Kasiya, Lilongwe to announce her "Building Education Foundation through Innovation and Technology" (BEFIT). The project was intended to improve digital education in all of the 6000 Malawian primary schools. BEFIT is based on the Unlocking Talent project which had delivered solar powered laptops to 217,000 primary students. The Unlocking Talent project which coming to a close was launched over a decade before. It had expanded in 2019 when funding was underwritten by the German government and work progressed with the support of Voluntary Service Overseas and the British One Billion organisation. The minister was supported at the announcement by the German ambassador Ute Konig.

Wirima was a member of the Malawi Parliamentary Women's Caucus which in 2024 was led by Roseby Gadama. She was re-elected in the 2025 election for the same constituency. She stood as the MCP candidate and she took just over 10,000 of the 20,000 votes cast.

Awards and achievements
Preceded by	Minister of Education of Malawi	Succeeded by
