= Lilongwe District =

District of Malawi

Coordinates: 14°00′S 33°35′E

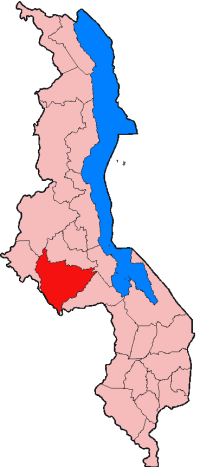
Location of Lilongwe Distribution Malawi

Lilongwe is a district in the Central Region of Malawi. The capital is Lilongwe.

The district covers an area of 6,159 km^{2} (2,378 sq mi) and has a population of 1,346,360. Lilongwe was officially declared a township in 1947. Life President Ngwazi Hastings Kamuzu Banda declared Lilongwe the capital city of Malawi on January 1, 1975 after a ten-year building period during which many people were forcibly displaced to make way for the new government buildings. Prior to 1975, the capital was the much smaller southern city of Zomba. Lilongwe is located 1,050 metres (3,440 ft) above sea level and has a temperature range between 65–75 °F (18–24 °C).

The airport is very small but quite adequate. It is served by Kenya Airways out of Nairobi, South African Airways, Proflight, Fastjet, Ethiopian Airlines and Malawi Airlines. In 2014 the government of Malawi relaunched its national airline and flies regionally to destinations like Dar es Salaam and Lusaka

== Demographics ==
At the time of the 2018 Census of Malawi, the distribution of the population of Lilongwe District by ethnic group was as follows:

- 73.5% Chewa
- 12.4% Tumbuka
- 5.2% Yao
- 3.1% Ngoni
- 2.0% Lomwe
- 0.1% Sena
- 0.1% Mang'anja
- 0.1% Tonga
- 0.1% Nkhonde
- 0.1% Lambya
- 0.1% Sukwa
- 0.1% Others

== Government and administrative divisions ==
There are twenty-two National Assembly constituencies in Lilongwe:

- Lilongwe Central
- Lilongwe City Central
- Lilongwe City North
- Lilongwe South East
- Lilongwe South West
- Lilongwe City West
- Lilongwe East
- Lilongwe Kumachenga
- Lilongwe Mapuyu North
- Lilongwe Mapuyu South
- Lilongwe Mpenu
- Lilongwe Mpenu Nkhoma
- Lilongwe Msinja North
- Lilongwe Msinja South
- Lilongwe Msozi North
- Lilongwe Msozi South
- Lilongwe North
- Lilongwe North East
- Lilongwe North West
- Lilongwe South
- Lilongwe South East
- Lilongwe South West

Since the 2009 election all of these constituencies have been held by members of the Malawi Congress Party and Independent Members of Parliament.
