= Kasungu District =

District of Malawi

Coordinates: 13°00′S 33°25′E

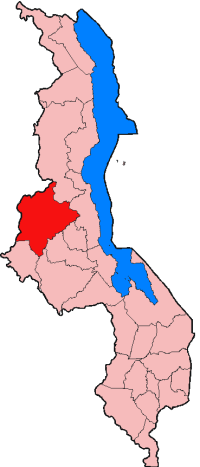
Location of Kasungu District in Malawi

Kasungu is a district in the Central Region of Malawi. The capital is Kasungu. The district covers an area of 7,878 km², borders Zambia and has a population of 842,953.

Kasungu was the home to Malawi's first president, Dr. Hastings Kamuzu Banda.

== Demographics ==
At the time of the 2018 Census of Malawi, the distribution of the population of Kasungu District by ethnic group was as follows:

- 78.1% Chewa
- 15.8% Tumbuka
- 1.9% Ngoni
- 1.8% Yao
- 1.6% Lomwe
- 0.2% Tonga
- 0.1% Mang'anja
- 0.1% Sena
- 0.1% Nkhonde
- 0.1% Lambya
- 0.1% Nyanja
- 0.0% Sukwa
- 0.1% Others

== Electoral divisions ==
There are ten National Assembly constituencies in Kasungu. Election were last held in 2025.

Constituency	Member of Parliament	Party
Central	Chikondi Chisale	Malawi Congress Party
East	Felix Nkhoma	Independent
North	Beatrice Roseby Mwale	Peoples Party
North East	Madalitso Wirima Kambauwa	Malawi Congress Party
North North East	Osward C. Chirwa	Democratic Progressive Party
North West	Emmanuel Joseph Mseteka	Malawi Congress Party
South	Simplex Ed Chithyola	Malawi Congress Party
South East	Golden Chizimba Msilimba	Independent
West	Jailosi Kalenje Bonongwe	Malawi Congress Party
South West	Milliam Jekapu	Independent

== Education ==
Kasungu District is notable for housing Kamuzu Academy, an elite international high school situated approximately 42 minutes from Kasungu Central Business District. The academy is renowned for its high academic standards and has produced many prominent Malawian leaders and professionals.

Other schools include Chayamba Secondary School, Kasungu Teacher's Training College and BOMA CDSS (Community Day Secondary School).
