= Malawi Congress Party =

Political party in Malawi

- Abbreviation: MCP
- President: Lazarus Chakwera
- Secretary-General: Richard Chimwendo Banda
- Treasurer General: John Paul
- Publicity Secretary: Jessie Kabwila
- Founders: Orton Chirwa; Aleke Banda
- Founded: 30 September 1959
- Preceded by: Nyasaland African Congress
- Headquarters: Lilongwe
- Youth wing: Malawi Young Pioneers (disbanded)
- Ideology: Ubuntu; Conservatism; African nationalism Anti-communism; 1964–1993: State capitalism
- Political position: Centre-right; Factions: Right-wing
- Regional affiliation: Democrat Union of Africa
- International affiliation: Centrist Democrat International
- Colors: Black, Red and Green
- National Assembly: 52 / 229
- SADC PF: 0 / 5
- Pan-African Parliament: 0 / 5

Election symbol
- Cockerel

Website
- www.malawicongress.party

The Malawi Congress Party (MCP) is a political party in Malawi. It was formed as a successor party to the banned Nyasaland African Congress when the country, then known as Nyasaland, was under British rule. The MCP, under Hastings Banda, presided over Malawian independence in 1964. From 1966 to 1993, the MCP was the only legal party in the country, and the party continued to be a major force in the country after losing power in the 1994 Malawian general election.

MCP returned to power in 2020 as part of the Tonse Alliance, a coalition formed with other parties including the United Transformation Movement and the People's Party, when its leader Lazarus Chakwera won the presidential election and led the government. However, after the alliance later collapsed, the MCP lost its hold on the presidency in the 2025 general election when the incumbent Chakwera conceded defeat to Peter Mutharika of the Democratic Progressive Party. As a result, MCP is now an opposition party at the national level.

The party remains one of the dominant forces in Malawian politics, with strong support especially in the central region, and continues to be influential in Parliament and local governance.

== History ==
The Malawi Congress Party was the successor to the Nyasaland African Congress (NAC) party, which was banned in 1959. The MCP was founded in 1959 by Orton Chirwa, Nyasaland's first African barrister, soon after his release from Gwelo Prison, and other NAC leaders including Aleke Banda and S. Kamwendo, in agreement with Hastings Kamuzu Banda, who remained in prison. The purpose for dashing the original NAC to form the MCP was the need for free operation since NAC was a banned party by that time.

Orton Chirwa became the first MCP president and later was succeeded by Hastings Banda after he was released from Gwelo Prison. Banda continued to hold the Presidency until his death in 1997.

In the 1961 Nyasaland elections, the MCP won all the seats in the legislature and later led Nyasaland to independence as Malawi in 1964. When Malawi became a republic in 1966, the MCP was formally declared to be the only legal party. For the next 27 years, the government and the MCP were effectively one. All adult citizens were required to be party members. They had to carry "party cards" in their wallets at all times.

The MCP lost its monopoly on power in a 1993 referendum and was roundly defeated in the country's first free elections the next year. It remains a major force in Malawian politics. It is strongest in the central region, populated by ethnic Chewa and Nyanja people.

== Affiliates ==
The current MCP set up has seen the spring up of affiliate groups that are all working to strengthen the party. Among them are Kokoliko, Mighty Tambala Graduates, Born Free and Malawi Congress Party Diaspora Network (MCPDN). The MCP Diaspora Network has seen all MCP members and supporters living outside Malawi working together in support of the mother party back home. It has Regional Wings in countries like the UK, South Africa, USA, Republic of Ireland, Canada, and the Gulf Region. As of 2020, the MCPDN leader is UK based Chalo Mvula.

== Presidents ==
- Orton Chirwa: 1959–1960
- Kamuzu Banda: 1960–1994
- Gwanda Chakuamba: 1994–2003
- John Tembo: 2003–2013
- Lazarus Chakwera: 2013–present

== Election results ==
=== Presidential elections ===
Election	Party candidate	Votes	%	Position	Result
1994	Hastings Banda	996,353	33.44%	▲2nd	Defeated
1999	Gwanda Chakuamba	2,106,790	45.21%	2nd	Defeated
2004	John Tembo	937,965	28.22%	2nd	Defeated
2009	John Tembo	1,365,672	30.49%	2nd	Defeated
2014	Lazarus Chakwera	1,455,880	27.8%	2nd	Defeated
2019	Lazarus Chakwera	1,781,740	35.41%	2nd	Defeated
2020	Lazarus Chakwera	2,604,043	59.34%	▲1st	Elected
2025	Lazarus Chakwera	1,765,170	33.01%	▼2nd	Defeated

=== National Assembly elections ===
Election	Party leader	Votes		%	Seats	+/–	Position
1961	Orton Chirwa	Lower roll	71,659	98.8%	22 / 28	▲22	▲1st
1961	Orton Chirwa	Higher roll	385	10.3%	22 / 28	▲22	▲1st
1964	Hastings Banda	General roll			50 / 53	▲28	1st
1964	Hastings Banda	Special roll			50 / 53	▲28	1st
1971	Hastings Banda				60 / 60	▲10	1st
1976	Hastings Banda				70 / 70	▲10	1st
1978	Hastings Banda			100%	87 / 87	▲17	1st
1983	Hastings Banda			100%	101 / 101	▲14	1st
1987	Hastings Banda			100%	112 / 112	▲11	1st
1992	Hastings Banda			100%	141 / 141	▲29	1st
1994	Hastings Banda	996,047		33.68%	56 / 177	▼85	▼2nd
1999	Gwanda Chakuamba	1,518,548		33.81%	66 / 193	▲10	2nd
2004	John Tembo	785,671		24.85%	57 / 193	▼9	2nd
2009	John Tembo	562,859		12.94%	26 / 193	▼31	2nd
2014	Lazarus Chakwera	895,659		17.37%	48 / 193	▲22	2nd
2019	Lazarus Chakwera	1,108,735		22.32%	55 / 193	▲7	2nd
2025	Lazarus Chakwera	TBA		TBA	52 / 229	▼3	2nd

== See also ==
- Official web site
