= Central Region, Malawi =

Region of Malawi

Central Region Chigawo cha Pakati (Chichewa) Chigaŵa cha Pakati (Tumbuka)
- Region
- Central Region in Malawi
- Coordinates: 13°37′28″S 33°31′48″E
- Country: Malawi
- Regional centre: Lilongwe

Area
  - Total: 35,592 km^{2} (13,742 sq mi)

Population (2018 Census)
  - Total: 7,523,340
  - Density: 211.38/km^{2} (547.46/sq mi)

The Central Region of Malawi, population 7,523,340 (2018), covers an area of 35,592 km^{2}. Its capital city is Lilongwe, which is also the national capital. The region has an outlet on Lake Malawi and borders neighbouring countries Zambia and Mozambique. The Chewa people make up the majority of the population today.

== Geography ==
The Central region is bounded on the north by the Northern Region, on the east by Lake Malawi, on the southeast by Southern Region, on the southwest by Mozambique, and on east by Zambia.

Central Region straddles the western edge of the East African Rift. Lake Malawi occupies most of the rift valley, with a narrow plain running along its western shore. Much of the region lies on a plateau, known as the Central Region Plateau or Lilongwe Plain. The plateau covers 23,310 square km (9,000 square miles). A belt of hills and escarpments separates the plateau from the rift valley lowlands to the east. The Dwangwa, Bua, and Lilongwe rivers drain the plateau, emptying eastwards into Lake Malawi.

The southwestern boundary of the region is mountainous, including the northern end of the Kirk Range and Dedza Mountain (2,198 m).

== Administration ==
Of the 27 districts in Malawi, 9 are located within the Central Region. They are: Dedza, Dowa, Kasungu, Lilongwe, Mchinji, Nkhotakota, Ntcheu, Ntchisi, and Salima.

== Population ==
Historical population
Year	Pop.	±% p.a.
1977	2,143,716	—
1987	3,110,986	+3.79%
1998	4,066,340	+2.46%
2008	5,497,252	+3.06%
2018	7,523,340	+3.19%

=== Ethnic groups ===
At the time of the 2018 Census of Malawi, the distribution of the population of the Central Region by ethnic group was as follows:

- 71.5% Chewa
- 14.6% Ngoni
- 4.9% Yao
- 3.2% Tumbuka
- 3.1% Lomwe
- 0.9% Tonga
- 0.5% Sena
- 0.4% Sukwa
- 0.4% Mang'anja
- 0.2% Nyanja
- 0.1% Nkhonde
- 0.1% Lambya
- 0.2% Others
