= National Assembly (Malawi) =

Supreme legislative body of Malawi

Coordinates: 13.9522°S 33.7878°E

Type
- Type: Lower house (de jure) (Note: The Constitution Provides for a Senate, but in practice the Senate has not yet been established; compare with the Federation Council of Iraq.) Unicameral (de facto)

History
- Founded: 26 May 1964
- New session started: 31 October 2025

Leadership
- Speaker: Sameer Suleman, Democratic Progressive Party since 29 October 2025
- Deputy Speaker: Victor Musowa, Democratic Progressive Party since 29 October 2025

Structure
- Seats: 229
- Political groups: Government (78): DPP (78); Independents (73): Independents (73); Opposition (73): MCP (52); UTM (8); UDF (4); AFORD (3); PP (3); NDP (1); PDP (1); FP (1); Vacancies (5): Vacancies (5)
- Length of term: 5 years

Elections
- Voting system: First-past-the-post
- First election: 17 April 1971
- Last election: 16 September 2025
- Next election: 17 September 2030

Meeting place
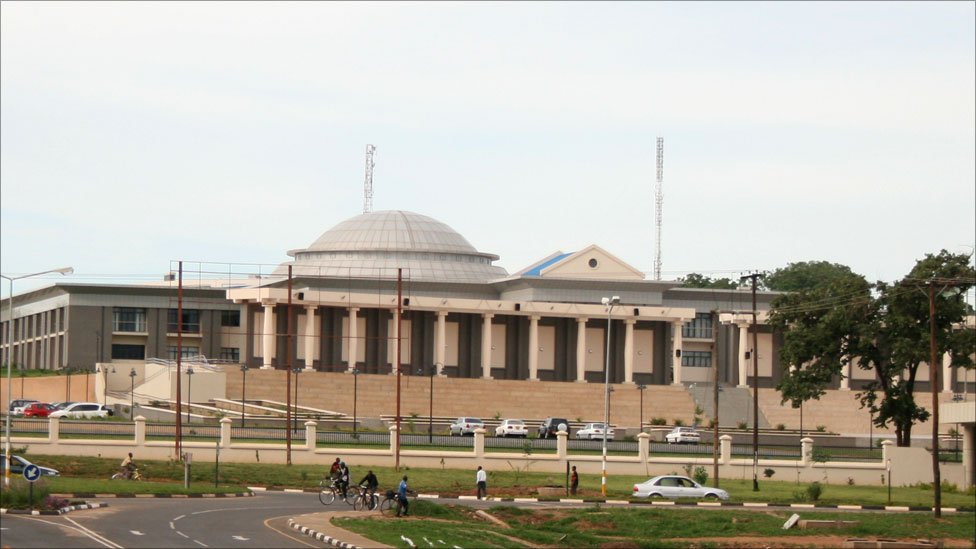
- Lilongwe

Website
- www.parliament.gov.mw

The National Assembly of Malawi is the supreme legislative body of the nation. It is situated on Capital Hill, Lilongwe along Presidential Way. The National Assembly alone possesses legislative supremacy and thereby ultimate power over all other political bodies in Malawi. At its head is the Speaker of the House who is elected by their peers. Since October 29, 2025, the Speaker is Sameer Suleman.

The 1994 Constitution provided for a Senate, but Parliament repealed it. Malawi therefore has a unicameral legislature in practice. The National Assembly has 229 members of Parliament (MPs) who are directly elected in single-member constituencies using the simple majority (or first-past-the-post) system and serve five-year terms.

== Current Parliament ==
The current parliament was inaugurated in October 2025 after the 2025 Malawian general election. No party managed to secure a majority in the house. Peter Mutharika won the presidential election.

== See also ==
- 2007 Malawian political crisis
- History of Malawi
- List of legislatures by country
- List of speakers of the National Assembly of Malawi
