= Health in Malawi =

Malawi ranks 170th out of 174 in the World Health Organization lifespan tables; 88% of the population live on less than £2.40 per day; and 50% are below the poverty line.

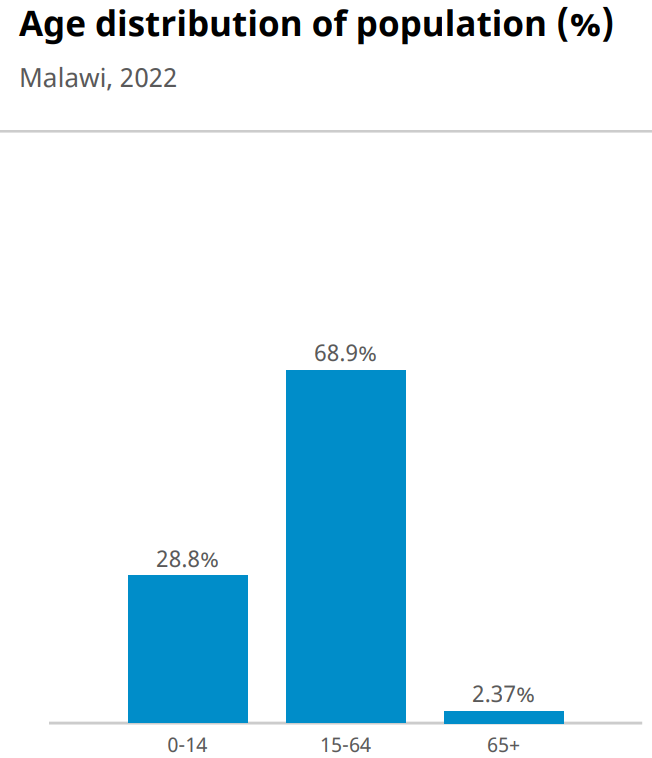
The age distribution of the population in Malawi

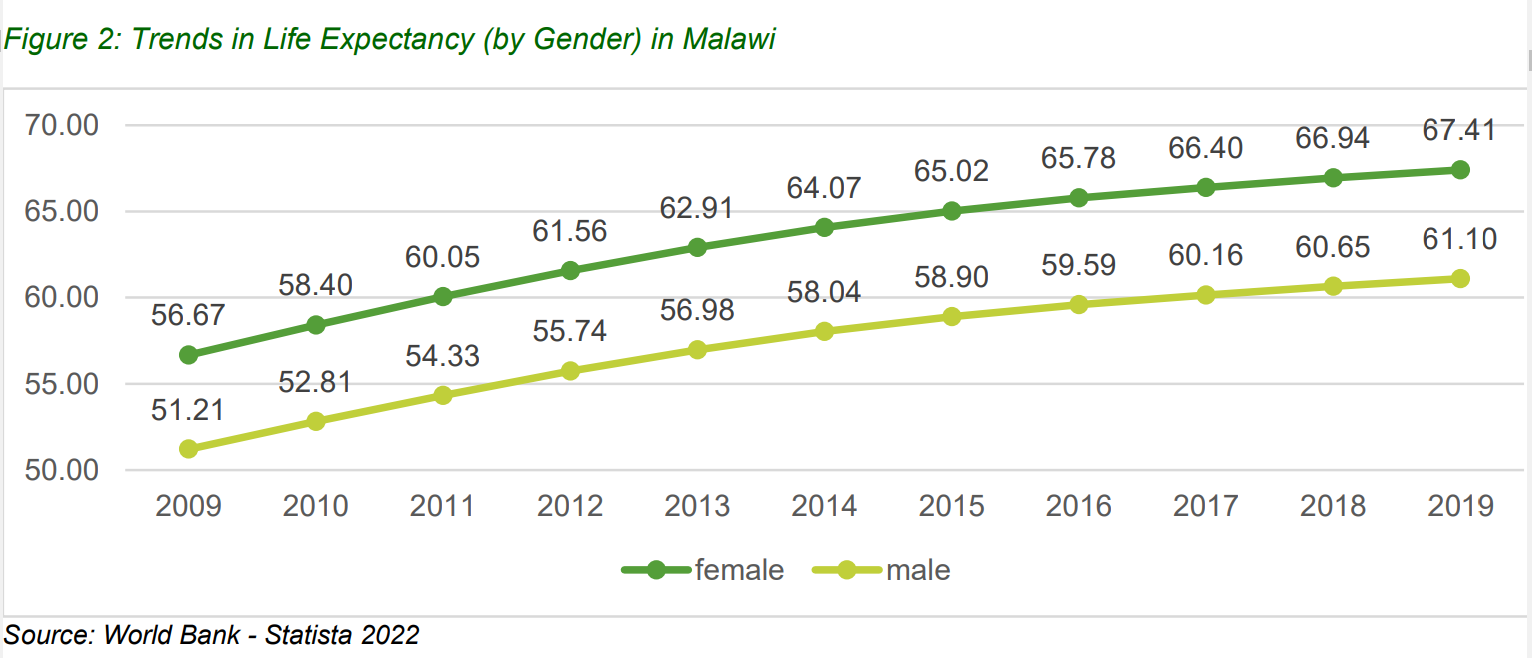
Trends in life expectancy in Malawi from 2009 to 2019

== Introduction ==
Malawi is perturbed by a heavy double burden of disease from both communicable and non-communicable diseases. This is evidenced by high levels of child and adult mortality rates and high prevalence of diseases such as tuberculosis, malaria, HIV/AIDS, and other communicable diseases. In addition to that, there is growing evidence that suggests that there is a growing burden of non-communicable diseases, which account nearly 32% of all deaths. According to the recent 2018 Census done by the National Statistical Office in Malawi, the country has a total population of 17.5 million people. Nearly 15% of the population is composed of children under five, 36% is aged between 5 and 17 years, and 49.7% is aged 18 years and above The current population in Malawi is 20,405,321 as of 2022, with a projected increase of 82% to 37,159,302 by 2050.

== Health status ==
=== Top 10 causes of death in Malawi ===
There has been a shift in causes of mortality in many countries over the years. This can be as result of different factors like improved health interventions and access to health care, improved economic and social status, and improved knowledge. This has resulted in a shift in the global burden of disease. According to the Institute for Health Metrics and Evaluation (IHME) the top ten causes of death in Malawi are:

1. HIV/AIDS (18.17%)
2. Respiratory infections and tuberculosis (12.96%)
3. Cardiovascular diseases (11.6%)
4. Maternal and neonatal disorders (9.36%)
5. Neoplasms (7.8%)
6. Enteric infections (6.27%)
7. Neglected tropical diseases and malaria (5.76%)
8. Digestive diseases (4.34%)
9. Other infectious diseases (4.29%)
10. Other non-communicable diseases (3.99%).
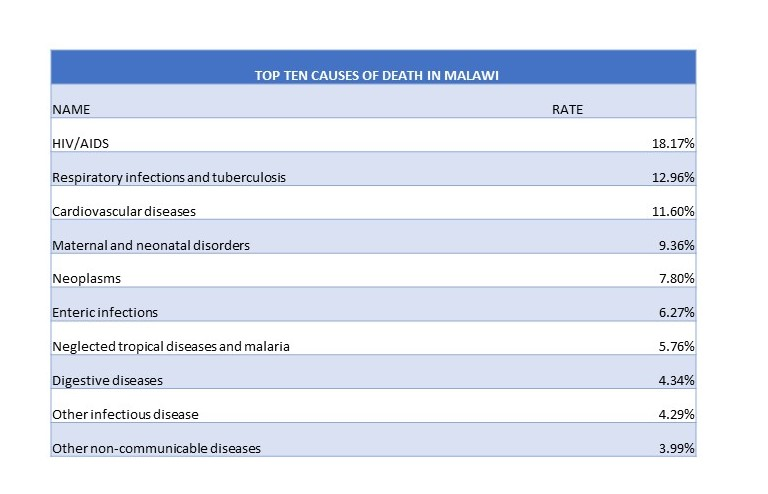
  Causes of death in Malawi

=== Life expectancy ===
In Malawi, life expectancy at birth (years) has improved by 17.8 years from 44.7 years in 2000 to 62.5 years in 2021, while healthy life expectancy at birth (years) has improved by 15.6 years from 39.1 years in 2000 to 54.7 years in 2021. As of 2018 the estimated average life expectancy at birth in Malawi was 64 years, with females having a slightly higher life expectancy at 67 years than males at 61.4 years.

=== Fertility rate ===
In 2014 Malawi had a total fertility rate of 2.1 children born/woman.

=== Infectious diseases ===
There is a high degree of risk for major infectious diseases, including bacterial and protozoal diarrhea, hepatitis A, typhoid fever, malaria, plague, schistosomiasis, and rabies.

=== HIV/AIDS ===
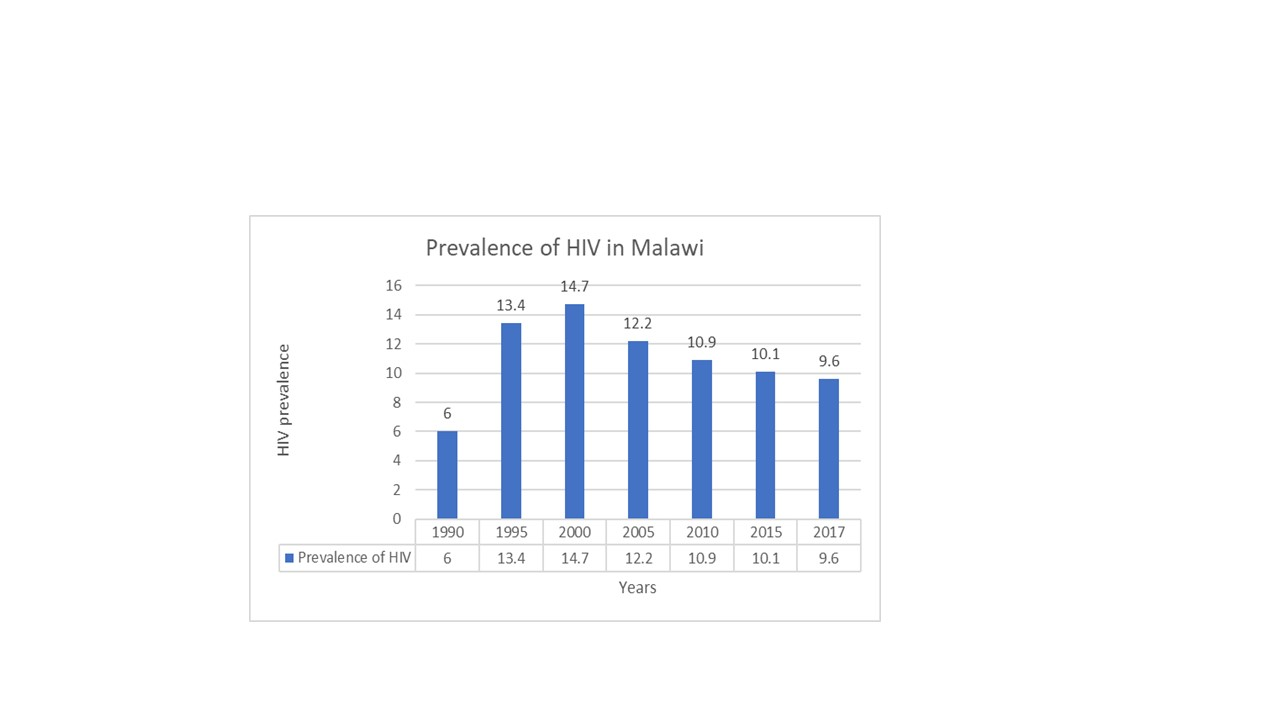

In 2013 Malawi had an adult HIV/AIDS prevalence rate of 11%. In 2013 there were 920,000 people living with HIV/AIDS and 51,000 AIDS-related deaths. Data indicate that 8.8% of women and men aged 15–49 have HIV and the prevalence is higher among women than men (10.8% versus 6.4%).

Due to the vast scope of the HIV/AIDS epidemic, many Malawian men believe that HIV contraction and death from AIDS are inevitable. Older men in particular often claim that the HIV/AIDS epidemic is a punishment issued by God or other supernatural forces. Other men refer to their own irresponsible sexual behaviors when explaining why they believe that death from AIDS is inevitable.

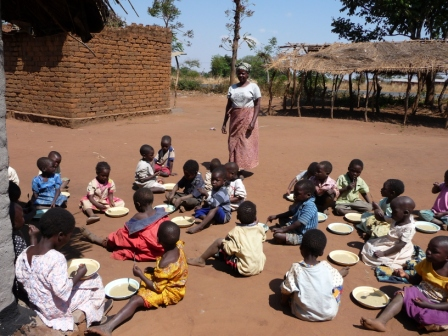
AIDS orphans in Malawi

These men sometimes claim that unprotected sex is natural (and therefore necessary and good) when justifying their lack of condom use during sex with extramarital partners. Finally, some men identify as HIV-positive without having undergone testing for HIV, preferring to believe that they have already been infected so they can avoid adopting undesirable preventative measures such as condom use or strict fidelity. Because of these fatalistic beliefs, many men continue engaging in extramarital sexual relations despite the prevalence of HIV/AIDS in Malawi.

However, despite these widespread feelings of fatalism, some men believe that they can avoid HIV contraction by modifying their personal behaviors. Men who decide to change their behaviors to reduce their risk of infection are unlikely to use condoms consistently, particularly during marital intercourse; instead, they usually continue engaging in extramarital sexual relations but alter the ways in which they choose their sexual partners.

For example, before selecting extramarital sexual partners, men sometimes survey their peers to determine whether their potential partners are likely to have exposed themselves to the virus. Men who choose their sexual partners based on external appearances and peer recommendations often believe that women who violate traditional gender norms by, for example, wearing modern clothing are more likely to carry HIV, while young girls, who are perceived as sexually inexperienced, are considered "pure". Because of this perception, many people are concerned that schoolchildren in Malawi, particularly girls, are becoming exposed to the virus through sexual harassment or abuse by their instructors.

=== Tuberculosis ===
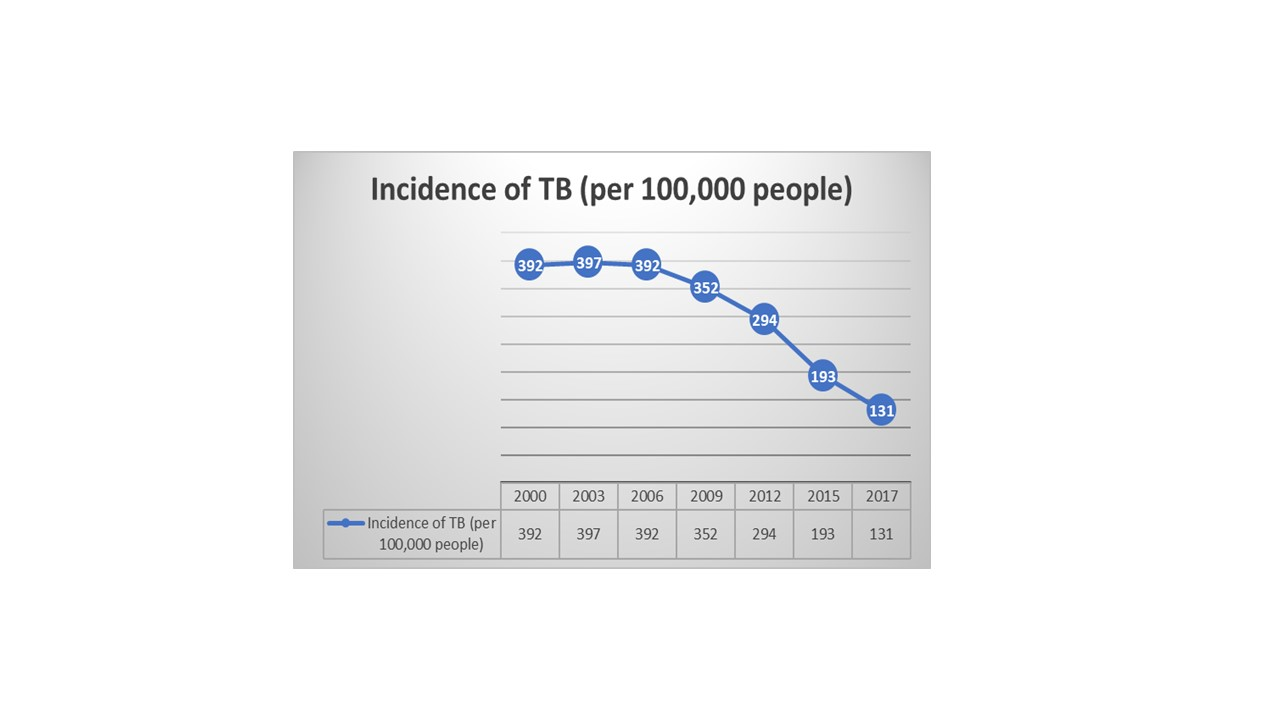

It is estimated that there are more than 14% of cases of tuberculosis infections worldwide in a year, with 9 million new cases and nearly 1.7 deaths. In 2014 the incidence of tuberculosis was 227 per 100,000 people in Malawi. The good news is that the incidence is declining by 1.5% each, however the transmission still remains high.

=== Endemic diseases ===
==== Malaria ====
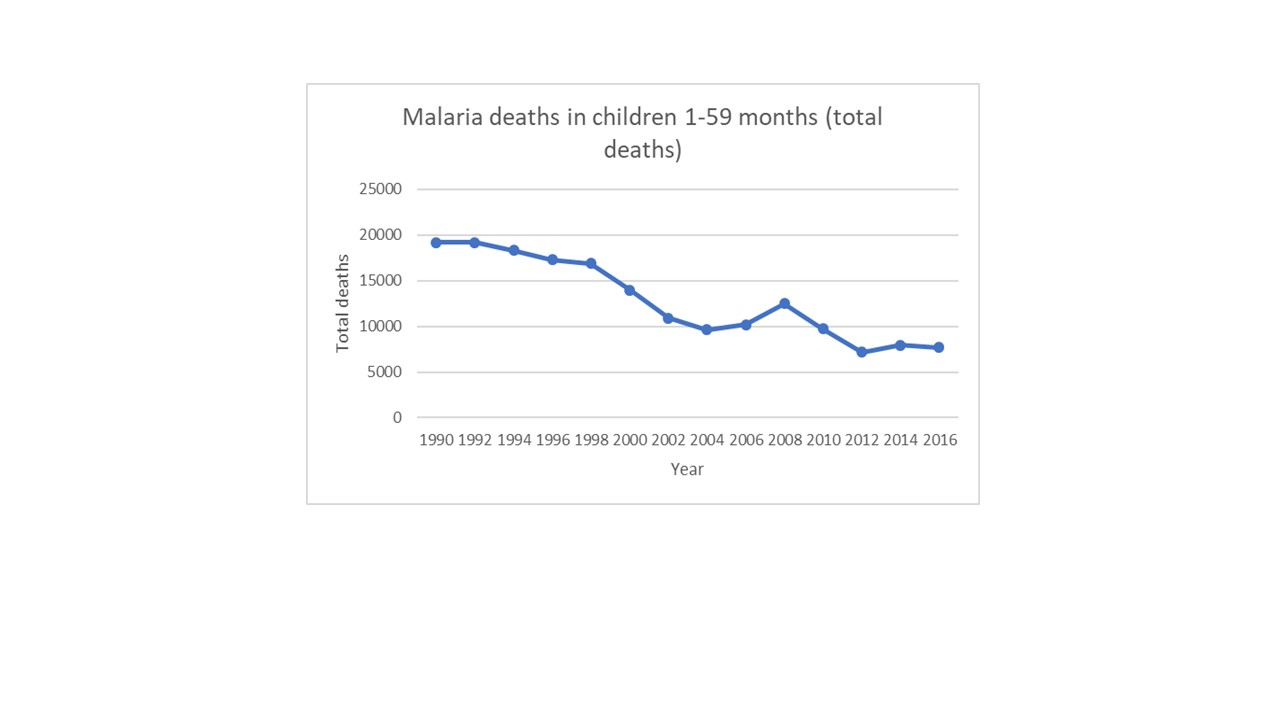

Malawi has made progress in malaria control in recent years; between 2006 and 2015, the mortality rate for children under five years of age declined from 122 deaths per 1,000 live births to an estimated 64 deaths per 1,000 live births. Despite this progress, malaria continues to be a major public health problem in Malawi. It is endemic in more than 95 percent of the country and is one of the major causes of morbidity and mortality across all age groups. Malaria is responsible for approximately 6.2 million presumed and confirmed cases reported annually from health facilities and by the community case management program, and 36 percent of all outpatient visits across all ages. Among children under five years of age, malaria parasite prevalence by microscopy was 33 percent nationally. Transmission is perennial in most areas and peaks during the rainy season from November to April. Higher malaria transmission occurs along Lake Malawi and the lowland areas of the lower Shire Valley. The Plasmodium falciparum parasite is the most common species of malaria. Resistance of anopheline vectors to insecticides has been extensively documented in Malawi, limiting the options for indoor residual spraying and raising concern regarding the continued effectiveness of insecticide-treated mosquito nets. To control malaria, the Ministry of Health's National Malaria Control Program has scaled up the distribution of artemisinin-based combination therapies, intermittent preventive treatment for pregnant women using sulfadoxine-pyrimethamine, and insecticide-treated nets.

=== Maternal and child healthcare ===
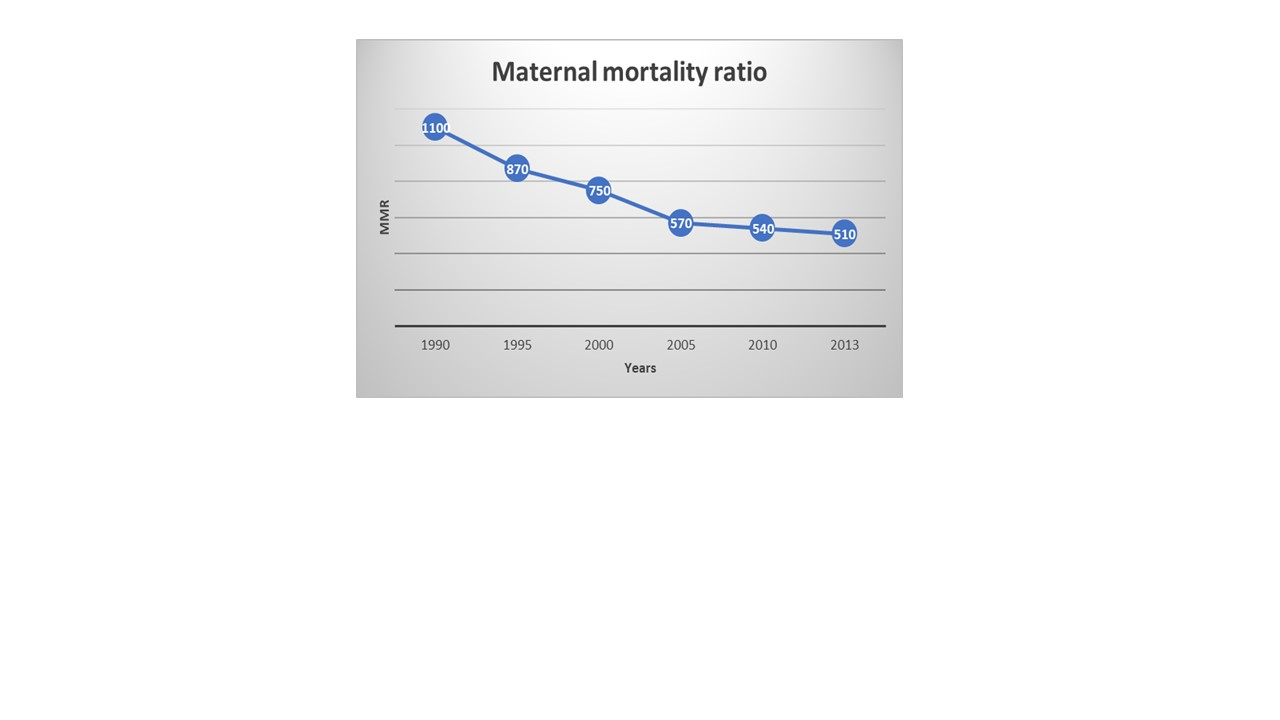

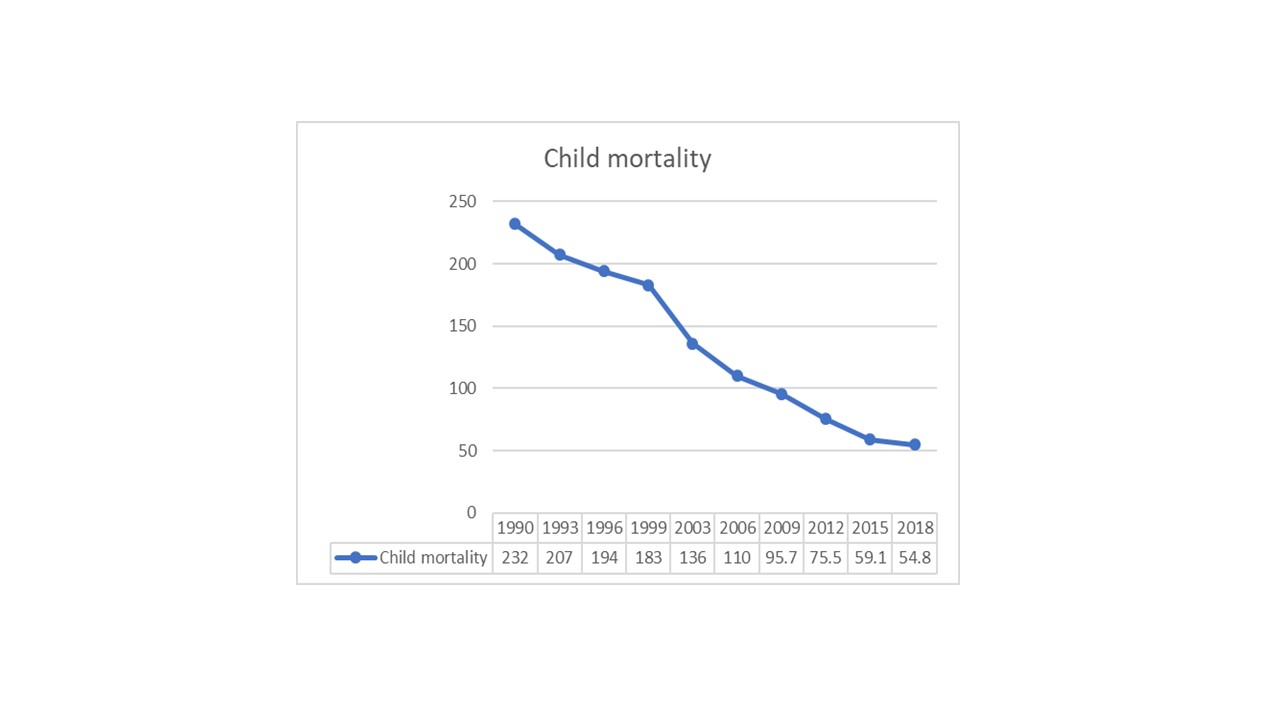

Maternal health has improved in Malawi due to a number of factors. There has been improvement made in the proportion of births attended by skilled professionals. The proportion has increased from 54.8% in 1992 to 87.4% in 2014. In addition to that, the maternal mortality is on the decrease, though at a slower rate. Since 1990 the maternal mortality ratio has decreased from 1100 deaths per 100,000 people to 510 deaths per 100,000 people in 2013. Improved access to sexual and reproductive health services has also contributed to the improvements in maternal health. Knowledge and of family planning is almost universal in Malawi with 98% of women and nearly 100% of men age 15-49 knowing at least one method of contraception. Child health has also improved in Malawi. According to the Demographic Health Survey (DHS) report, the number of children dying before reaching their fifth birthday has declined, from 234 deaths per 1000 live births in 1992 to 63 deaths per 1000 live births in 2015–16. Child health is an important area to focus our efforts on to better the health status because children are the most vulnerable group (especially those below the age of five), and most importantly, it is their right to survive and live better lives. In Malawi, the child mortality rate is very high, although there has been a decline over the years, from 234 deaths per 1000 live births in 1992 to 63 deaths per 1000 live births in 2015. In addition, the neonatal mortality has gone down to 27 deaths per 1000 live births in 2004.

=== Non-communicable diseases ===
The shift in the burden of disease has led to non-communicable diseases (NCDs) becoming the leading cause of death globally, most of these deaths are due to cardiovascular disease, cancer, chronic respiratory diseases, or diabetes. Mortality from many NCDs is on the rise worldwide, with a disproportionately larger burden in low-middle-income countries (LMICs), where almost 3/4 of deaths globally occur from these causes. As of 2016 NCDs are estimated to account for 31.7% of deaths in Malawi, and the numbers are on the rise in countries throughout sub-Saharan Africa.

Cervical cancer is a major public health burden in Malawi. In 2023, Malawi had an estimated 4,701 new cervical cancer cases and 3,340 deaths, according to the International Agency for Research on Cancer. A systematic review and meta-analysis found that women living with HIV had a 6.07-fold higher risk of cervical cancer. In a nationally representative 2020–2021 survey, 16.5% of women in Malawi reported ever being screened for cervical cancer.

=== Health indicators ===
The CIA World Fact Book's "country comparison to the world" ranking indicates how Malawi's health indicators compare to other countries in the world. Since the first case of HIV/AIDS in Malawi in 1985, HIV/AIDS has drastically affected Malawi's health indicators. Malawi's rankings:

== Climate change and health in Malawi ==
Human health is profoundly affected by weather and climate. Malawi is currently facing a lot of problems that are having a negative impact on the health of people in the country. The United Nations' Sustainable Development Goal 13 state that there is need for all countries to Take Urgent Action to Combat Climate Change and Its Impacts. Unfortunately, Malawi is not doing so well on this, and this is having devastating impacts on the already struggling health care delivery system.

For the past years the country has been through a lot of climate related natural hazards such as increase in temperatures, floods, cyclones, droughts. All of these are becoming a serious threat to life and human health in Malawi.

=== Extreme weather event related, injuries, and mortality in Malawi from 2000 to 2022 ===
The table shows total deaths and total number of people that have been affected due to extreme weather events from 2000 to 2022 according to the International Disasters Database

Extreme events	Subtype	Events count	Total deaths	Total affected
Flood	Flash flood	5	21	192,246
Flood	Riverine flood	15	297	1,052,301
Flood	Coastal flood	2	67	518,500
Flood	Other	9	73	1,334,070
Drought	Drought	5	500	17,049,435
Landslide	Landslide	1	8	109
Storm	Convective storm	2	18	55,901
Storm	Tropical cyclone	3	60	116,958
Storm	Other	1	11	19

For instance, floods cause loss of life and injury when buildings are washed away while some fall on people. This is mainly because most houses in Malawi are not constructed to withstand natural disasters such as floods. Most of the houses are built with mud bricks or clay with shallow and weak foundations.

==== Risk of disease outbreaks ====
The destruction of most settlement homes and hospital buildings causes a disruption or lack of routine vaccination services. These unvaccinated people come into direct contact with cases of vaccine preventable diseases, which can cause outbreaks and other health problems in the population.Waterborne diseases such as cholera and dysentery are also on the increase because of the contamination of surface waters and from floods. The natural disasters also disrupt and degrade water and sanitation services which are vital in preventing and controlling waterborne diseases.

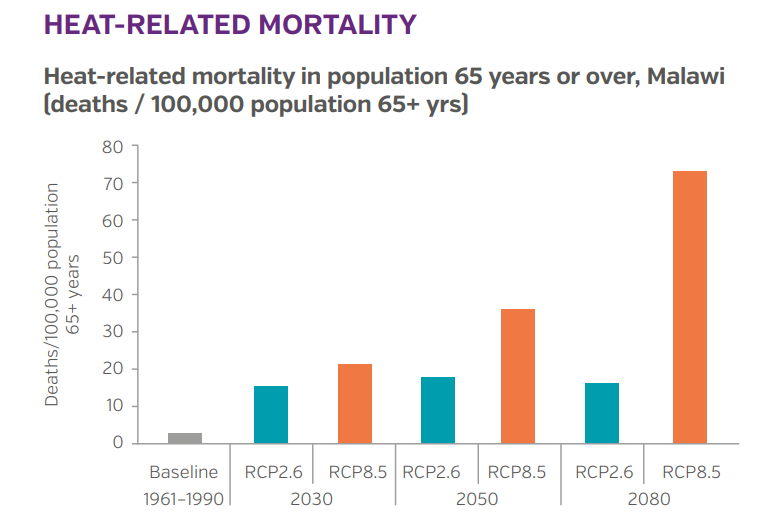
Heat related mortality in Malawi

===== Heat related health risks =====
Due to the high temperatures, there has been increased cases of heat exhaustion and heat stroke, heat stress, heat rash, cramps, dehydration, as well as the worsening of pre-existing conditions more especially those related to cardiovascular conditions such as heart attacks and stroke.

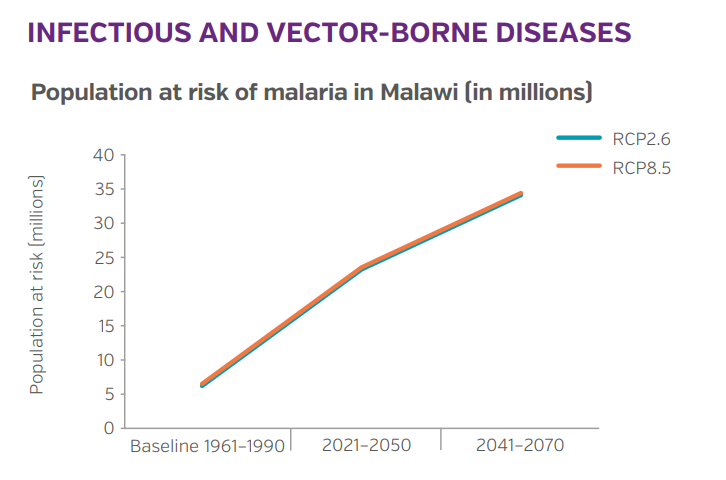
Increased risk of vector borne diseases- malaria in Malawi

===== Climate change and vector borne diseases =====
The changing climatic conditions are also leading to the increase in infectious disease patterns more especially vector borne diseases such as malaria and dengue fever. This is mostly due to the increased amount of rainfall which is creating a lot of bleeding grounds of mosquitoes, and the high temperature are also ideal for the multiplication of the mosquitoes.

====== Climate change and mental health ======
The extreme weather events are also leading to the increase in mental health problems in the country. These include post-traumatic stress disorders due to the traumatic events they are exposed to during cyclones and other disasters. Some of the traumatic events include the loss of loved ones as well as losing their settlement homes and poor harvests. All this further leads to depression or precipitate psychotic episodes

== Conclusion ==
Malawi still faces a major burden of disease from both communicable and non-communicable diseases. There is indeed progress in combating these problems, but a lot still needs to be done. There will be always problems but the country needs to establish a good way of dealing with the problems that are there, with the available resources, in order to prevent more loss life from preventable and treatable diseases. Malawi faces significant climate-related challenges that directly and indirectly impact health.

== See also ==
- Healthcare in Malawi
- Mental health in Malawi
