= District health system in Malawi =

A District Health System (DHS) is a health system that operates at the level of a District. It considers the factors contributing to health in the district's environment. The organization's aim, based on the principles of the primary health care (PHC) approach, is to be equitable, efficient and effective.

== Districts ==
In Malawi, districts represent the lowest level, fully organized unit of government. Their populations vary widely, ranging from around 100,000 to over 1 million people. The DHS is organized within this context of well-defined populations living within a clearly delineated administrative and geographical area.

DHS comprises 28 districts in Malawi and 27 district hospitals; Phalombe District does not have a district hospital.

== Infrastructure ==
The Neno district's health infrastructure consists of a district hospital, a community hospital, and eleven health centers. Of these, four belong to the Faith Based Christian Association of Malawi (CHAM), and one is owned by a statutory corporation. It is estimated that 62% of health services are run by the Ministry of Health while 38% are run by CHAM, with private for-profit organizations covering the rest.

Newly constructed Neno District Hospital now approved by Medical Council

Although health care in Malawi is largely free at the point of service in public facilities, universal health coverage is hampered by distance, cost of travel, and fees for services in most faith-based facilities.

Partners In Health has supported the Ministry of Health with infrastructure development and human resources as well as community outreach. Other NGOs in the District include World Vision International, Save the Children, and the Family Planning Association of Malawi.

== Leadership ==
The District Health Management Team (DHMT) is led by a district health officer who reports to the District Executive Committee locally as well as to the Central Ministry of Health through a Zonal Supervisor. Leadership role has many other responsibilities like to look after work related concerns to documentations with respect to each department.

== Service organization ==
Village Health Committees, Village Health Workers, and Health Surveillance Assistants provide community-based services while Health Centers are the main primary care facilities.

A referral system links patients from the lower to the upper tiers. Both the community hospital and the district hospital also offer primary care services for their immediate catchment populations in addition to serving as local referral facilities. More complicated cases are referred to a tertiary hospital in Blantyre.
