= Malawi National Cancer Center =

Cancer treatment center in Malawi

- Malawi Ministry of Health & Development Partners
- Location within Malawi

Geography
- Location: Kamuzu Central Hospital, Lilongwe, Central Region, Malawi
- Coordinates: 13°58′28″S 33°47′17″E

Organisation
- Care system: Public
- Type: Cancer Treatment, Research and Teaching

History
- Founded: 2020; 6 years ago

Links
- Other links: List of hospitals in Malawi; Healthcare in Malawi

Malawi National Cancer Centre (MNCC), also Malawi National Cancer Treatment Centre (MNCTC), is a public, specialized, tertiary care medical facility owned by the Malawi Ministry of Health. Since 2020, the facility's administrative department is temporarily housed within Kamuzu Central Hospital, in Nangwagwa (Area 33), in Lilongwe, the capital city of Malawi. Construction of a stand-alone cancer unit separate but adjacent to the hospital was completed in June 2025. This is the first and only cancer treatment unit in the country.

== Overview ==
MNCC is a cancer treatment, research, and teaching center, affiliated with the Kamuzu Central Hospital (KCH), the tertiary referral hospital in the city of Lilongwe, serving both the Northern and Central regions of Malawi. Since early 2020 MNCC maintains an administrative office inside KCH and temporarily houses some oncology patients on the wards of KCH. The temporary administrative and clinical leaders of the project are drawn from the national ministry of health and the KCH.

The MNCC is a collaborative effort that involves the following institutions and entities:

1. The Malawi Ministry of Health
2. The University of North Carolina
3. Baylor College of Medicine

== Background ==
Malawi is a Southern African country, with a population of about 23 million as of 2023. Of that number, it is estimated that 84 percent live in rural areas, far away from healthcare facilities capable of diagnosing and treating their malignancies.

Malawi's National Cancer Control Strategic Plan 2019–2029, has its objectives arranged the following broad headlines:

1. Cancer prevention
2. Screening and early diagnosis
3. Treatment and follow-up care
4. Palliative care and survivorship
5. Governance and financing
6. Cancer control research, monitoring and evaluation.

To achieve objectives 2 and 3 a plan was conceived to open a free-standing cancer center to carry out comprehensive diagnosis, classification, treatment, rehabilitation, training and research in the most prevalent adult and pediatric cancers in Malawi.

== Construction cost and funding ==
In 2014, the government of Malawi, through the Malawian Ministry of Health, borrowed US$13.15 million to establish MNCC. The total project cost was budgeted at US$14.75 million, with the national government contributing US$1.60 million. The loan was sourced from the OPEC Fund for International Development. The table below illustrates the sources of funding for the construction of the cancer centre.

Malawi National Cancer Centre Construction Funding
Rank	Development Partner	Contribution in US Dollars	Percentage	Notes
1	OPEC Fund for International Development	13.15 million	89.15	Loan
2	Government of Malawi	1.60 million	10.85	Equity
	Total	14.75 million	100.00	

The International Atomic Energy Agency (IAEA) provided technical support for the construction and commissioning of the facility.

== Developments ==
As of August 2023, the construction of the MNCC is ongoing. The infrastructure includes in-patient wards for cancer patients, an outpatient unit, administrative offices, laboratories, radiology, radiotherapy and nuclear medicine infrastructure. Before the establishment of the cancer centre, there were no radiotherapy or nuclear medicine facilities in the country.

As of December 2023, it was expected that the completed new facility would be ready to come online in March 2024. The project, whose construction began in 2018, had a planned completion window of 18 months. However, lack of appropriate expertise, death of an expert consultant and other factors led to delays.

The new Center officially opened on July 2, 2025 with an inauguration attended by President Lazarus Chakwera, and the Director General of the International Atomic Energy Agency (IAEA) Rafael Grossi.

== See also ==
- List of hospitals in Malawi
- Uganda Cancer Institute
