= International Blantyre Cancer Centre =

Hospital in Malawi

- The Thomson and Barbara Mpinganjira Foundation
- Location within Malawi

Geography
- Location: Nyambadwe, Blantyre, Southern Region, Malawi
- Coordinates: 15°46′02″S 35°01′28″E

Organisation
- Care system: Private
- Type: Cancer Treatment, Research and Teaching

Services
- Beds: 60

History
- Founded: March 5, 2024; 2 years ago

Links
- Other links: List of hospitals in Malawi

The International Blantyre Cancer Centre (IBCC) is a private, specialised, tertiary care medical facility owned by the Thomson and Barbara Mpinganjira Foundation. It is the first and only free-standing cancer treatment and research centre in Malawi's Southern Region. The centre was opened by Lazarus Chakwera, the President of Malawi, on 5 March 2024.

== Location ==
The facility is located in the neighborhood known as Nyambadwe, in the city of Blantyre, in the Southern Region of Malawi.

== Overview ==
IBCC is a cancer treatment, research, and teaching centre, owned and operated by the Thomson and Barbara Mpinganjira Foundation. The facility offers 60 inpatient beds. On offer are screening and diagnostic services on an outpatient basis. Inpatient services include both chemotherapy and radiotherapy services.

The cancer centre was established by business mogul Thomson Mpinganjira, in memory of his late wife, Barbara Mpingajira, who died of cancer in a South African hospital in January 2019.

Thomson Mpinganjira is a wealthy Malawian, who is credited with the founding of FDH Bank, a Malawian commercial bank among other financial investments. He stated that the medical equipment at IBCC was sourced from Belgium.

In March 2024, the Malawi Voice reported that the cancer centre is owned jointly 50/50 by the Thomson & Barbara Mpinganjira Foundation and the Roman Catholic charity organisation Organismo Mundial de Cursillos de Cristiandad (OMCC), based in Belgium and Luxembourg.

== Facilities and cost ==
The centre is equipped with modern cancer screening and diagnostic equipment. It also offers chemotherapy and radiation services to both inpatients and outpatients on a daily basis. The cost of construction and equipment acquisition is calculated at about €10 million.

== Timeline ==
Construction started in 2019. The cancer centre was officially opened on 5 March 2024 by Lazarus Chakwera, the president of Malawi.

== See also ==
- List of hospitals in Malawi
- Malawi National Cancer Center
