= Tamia Ja =

Malawian social media influencer

- Born: Hannah Jabesi; December, 2000; Malawi
- Other name: Tamia J
- Occupations: Social media influencer, Content creator
- Known for: Outspoken online commentary and public controversies

Tamia Ja (real name Hannah Jabesi) is a Malawian social media influencer known for her outspoken views and frequent controversies. She has been involved in disputes with police over withheld funds and legal proceedings concerning alleged unlawful disclosure of private HIV health information.

In 2024, she received the Content Creator of the Year award in the MBC’s Entertainers of the Year (2024).

== Career ==
Ja rose to prominence as a fearless and unfiltered social media personality, attracting a large following for her commentary on Malawian society.

== Controversies and legal issues ==
=== Withheld funds dispute ===
In February 2025, Ja clashed with Lingadzi Police, accusing officers for withholding MK1.2 million of her money after a search of her home and confiscation of her passport.

=== HIV disclosure case ===
In June 2025, the High Court dismissed Ja’s application to drop a case alleging she unlawfully revealed another person’s HIV status on social media. After few months, she was also served with an injunction by fellow socialite Chawezi Banda, also known as Cha Cha, for allegedly publishing defamatory content.

=== Ongoing court proceedings ===
Despite being jailed several times, she has been continuously criticized government issues and related matters.
