= Heather Cubie =

British bacteriologist

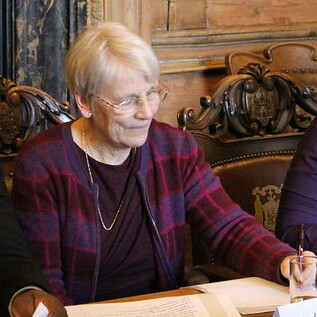
- Born: 8 December 1946 (age 79)
- Education: University of Edinburgh
- Occupation: Professor
- Employer: University of Edinburgh
- Known for: leading the National HPV Reference Laboratory

Professor Lady Heather A. Cubie MBE, FRCPath, FRSE (born 8 December 1946), was formerly Research and Development Director for NHS Lothian and Honorary Professor of Research and Research Management at the University of Edinburgh.

Professor Cubie is known for her work on Human Papillomavirus (HPV) including leading the National HPV Reference Laboratory as well as her involvement in the establishment and development of strategy, service change and implementation of the HPV immunisation programme in Scotland.

== Early life and education ==
Cubie was born in 1947. She graduated from the University of Edinburgh in 1968 and stayed there to complete her masters degree and a doctorate.

== Career ==
Cubie was Research and Development Director for NHS Lothian from 1996 to 2008. She developed and facilitated applied research collaborations between NHS Lothian and academic researchers.

Cubie was the first Director of the National HPV Reference Laboratory and led the service until 2012. Cubie continued her HPV research and to lead the HPV Research Group at the University of Edinburgh.

Cubie was involved in developing career structures for scientists and establishing opportunities for collaborative research in her role as Head of Service for training of Clinical Scientists in Microbiology from 1994 to 2012.

Cubie became semi-retired, as she was active within SHINe. This was a goup of people interested in the HPV.

She became an honorary Professor of the University of Edinburgh in 2006 and two years later she became a visiting professor of the University of Glasgow. In 2008 Scotland introduced routine vaccination of schoolgirls aged 12 or 13 against the virus which causes cervical cancer. Cubie was involved in its implementation and the supporting academic studies. Follow-up studies concluded that the incidence of the virus had fallen dramatically.

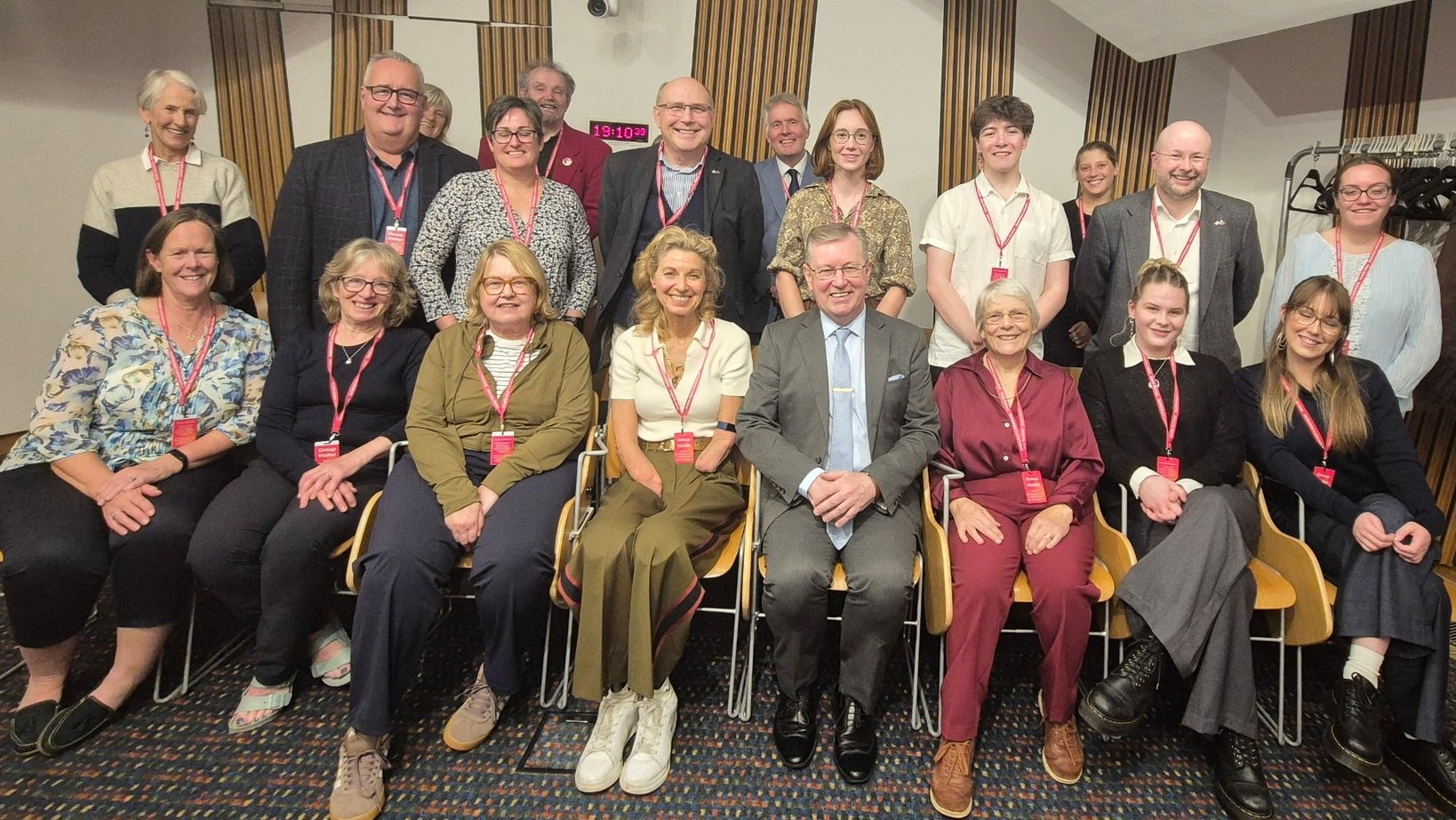
Olivia Giles presentation in the Scottish Parliament - Prof Cubie is centre front right.

She worked to establish a cervical cancer screening programme in Malawi. starting with 2013 a grant by the Scottish government. It allowed Cubie and Christine Campbell to establish a screening programme for cervical cancer based at Nkhoma Mission Hospital. This cancer was prevalent in Malawi accounting for nearly half of all cancers and it achieved an 80% mortality.

In 2016 she joined and in 2019 she succeeded Ken Ross who had been the President of the Scotland Malawi Partnership for eleven years. She served for five years and stood down in 2024.

=== Human Papillomavirus Group ===
Cubie was the director of the HPV Research Group at the University of Edinburgh which worked with the Scottish HPV Reference Laboratory (Department of Laboratory Medicine, Royal Infirmary of Edinburgh) and the Scottish HPV Investigator's Network (SHINE). This group undertakes research that aims to help improve health service provision for the prevention, detection and management of cervical cancer and other HPV related diseases. Cubie has published extensively.

== Honours ==
In 2012, Cubie was made an MBE in the Queen's Birthday Honours for services to Healthcare Science in Scotland. She was also made a Fellow of the Royal Society of Edinburgh in the same year.

== Private life ==
She married the lawyer Andrew (later Sir) Cubie and they had three children Douglas, Alison and the presenter Cat Cubie.
