= Zomba Central Hospital =

Tertiary referral hospital in Malawi

Mzuzu Central Hospital
- Location of Zomba

Geography
- Location: Zomba, Malawi
- Coordinates: 15°23′13″S 35°19′09″E

Organisation
- Type: District General, Teaching
- Affiliated university: University of North Carolina; University of Malawi

Services
- Emergency department: Yes
- Beds: 410

Helipads
- Helipad: No

History
- Founded: 1941; 85 years ago

Links
- Other links: List of hospitals in Malawi

Zomba Central Hospital is a tertiary referral hospital in Zomba, Malawi. It serves nearly 2 million people, referred from several hospitals in the Malawi districts, as well as from other parts of Malawi. The hospital also receives patients from several neighboring countries.

== Location ==
The hospital is located in Zomba District.

== Overview ==
As a public hospital of the former capital of Malawi, it serves as the main referral hospital for Southern and Central Region of Malawi. The hospital also provides health services to the local community.

It has several ranges of health care services including inpatient and outpatient, as well as emergency care. It furthermore provides radiology, laboratory and child health services to all patients. The hospital also has specialized clinics for each specialised patient. The hospital implements a comprehensive quality assurance system that is well monitored and reviewed regularly to make sure that high quality standards are being maintained.

== See also ==
- List of hospitals in Malawi
