= Jamie Andrew =

Scottish mountaineer

- Born: 3 August 1969 (age 57); Bearsden, Glasgow, Scotland
- Education: University of Edinburgh
- Occupation: Mountaineer
- Spouse: Anna Wyatt
- Children: 3
- Website: www.jamieandrew.com/

Jamie Andrew (born 3 August 1969) is a Scottish mountaineer. He became a quadruple amputee after a mountaineering accident and he has continued to climb and to work for charities.

== Early life ==
Andrew was born in Bearsden, just outside Glasgow. He attended school there, and later in Glasgow. He went on to study for a BEng in Electrical Engineering at the University of Edinburgh. He completed an MSc at Bangor in North Wales and then moved to Edinburgh where he still lives.

In 1995 he embarked on a career as an Industrial Rope Access Technician, tacking construction and maintenance projects on high buildings involving abseiling. Projects included work on oil rigs, viaducts, power stations, and painting the Forth Bridge. He became a Team Leader, Safety Supervisor and Rope Access Trainer for rope access company based in an Edinburgh.

== Accident ==
In January 1999 Andrew and his friend Jamie Fisher got caught in a storm after having climbed the north face of Les Droites in the Mont Blanc massif. Having made it up the north face the two men were beset by snow, winds of 90 mph and temperatures of -30 °C, for the following four nights. On the last night Fisher died of hypothermia. Despite having developed frostbite, Andrew survived the experience, being helicoptered off the mountain by the French rescue services. His ordeal was featured on the documentary series I Shouldn't Be Alive. The episode is titled Death Climb and first aired on 26 January 2011.

=== After amputation ===
Amputation of all four limbs was necessary to save Andrew's life from septic shock. After he recovered from the surgery, he spent several months in rehabilitation. After his first walk (with no hands or feet) up Blackford Hill Andrew took part in skiing, snowboarding, paragliding, orienteering, running, hill walking, caving, rock climbing and mountaineering. He has walked up Ben Nevis, raising £15,000 for charity in the process, run the London Marathon in 2001 raising £22,000 for charity, made many ascents of 4,000 m peaks in the Alps and climbed Kilimanjaro with three other disabled mountaineers, raising £5,000 for charity. In 2007 he partnered with another quadruple amputee, Olivia Giles, to create the charity 500 Miles (named after the song). They were given permission to use the name by The Proclaimers. The charity was launched to fund prosthetic care abroad.

In 2012 Andrew climbed the Olympic Stadium of the London 2012 games as part of Channel 4's "Meet the Superhumans" campaign to launch the Paralympic Games.

Andrew gives talks throughout the UK and in 2004 published the book Life and Limb, which tells his story. According to Andrew his challenge for the future is his young daughter and twins. In April 2014 he was a guest on the BBC Radio 4 programme Midweek. Seven Summits with boparfet.

On 4 August 2016, Andrew climbed to the top of the 4,478-metre (14,692 ft) Matterhorn in Zermatt, accompanied by two local mountaineers.

== Personal life ==
In June 2000 he married his long-term partner, Anna Wyatt. In February 2004 the couple had a son, and in May 2006 they had twins, a girl and a boy.

== Works ==
- Andrew, Jamie (2005). Life and Limb. Portrait. ISBN 978-0749-9505-21.
