= HIV/AIDS in Malawi =

Impact of the immunodeficiency virus in the African nation

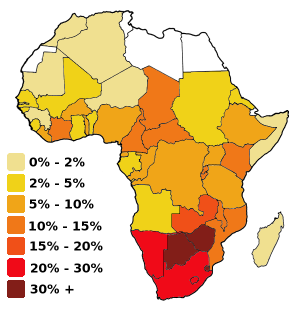
Prevalence of HIV/AIDS in adult (ages 15–49) populations (1999–2002)

As of 2012, approximately 1,100,000 people in Malawi are HIV-positive, which represents 10.8% of the country's population. Because the Malawian government was initially slow to respond to the epidemic under the leadership of Hastings Banda (1966–1994), the prevalence of HIV/AIDS increased drastically between 1985, when the disease was first identified in Malawi, and 1993, when HIV prevalence rates were estimated to be as high as 30% among pregnant women. The Malawian food crisis in 2002 resulted, at least in part, from a loss of agricultural productivity due to the prevalence of HIV/AIDS. Various degrees of government involvement under the leadership of Bakili Muluzi (1994–2004) and Bingu wa Mutharika (2004–2012) resulted in a gradual decline in HIV prevalence, and, in 2003, many people living in Malawi gained access to antiretroviral therapy. Condoms have become more widely available to the public through non-governmental organizations, and more Malawians are taking advantage of HIV testing services.

Due to several successful television and radio campaigns by the Malawian government and non-governmental organizations in Malawi, levels of awareness regarding HIV/AIDS are high among the general population. However, many men have adopted fatalistic attitudes in response to the epidemic, convincing themselves that death from AIDS is inevitable; on the other hand, some have implemented preventive techniques such as partner selection to try to reduce their risk of infection. Although many women have developed strategies to protect themselves from HIV, women are more likely to be HIV-positive than men in Malawi. The epidemic has affected sexual relationships between partners, who must cooperate to protect themselves from the disease. In addition, many teachers exclude HIV/AIDS from their curricula because they are uncomfortable discussing the topic or because they do not feel knowledgeable about the issue, and, therefore, many children are not exposed to information about HIV/AIDS at school. Finally, the epidemic has produced significant numbers of orphans in Malawi, leaving children vulnerable to abuse and exploitation.

== History ==
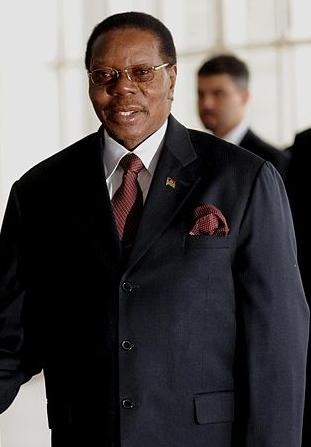
Bingu wa Mutharika, third President of Malawi (2004–2012)

The first case of HIV/AIDS in Malawi was reported at Lilongwe's Kamuzu Central Hospital in 1985. President Hastings Banda, who was in power at the time, responded with several small-scale prevention initiatives and created the National AIDS Control Programme, a division of the Ministry of Health, to manage the growing epidemic. Banda believed that issues relating to sex, including HIV transmission, should not be addressed in the public sphere; during this time, it was illegal for Malawian citizens to discuss the epidemic openly. In 1989, Banda introduced a five-year World Bank Medium Term Plan to combat the epidemic, but HIV prevalence had already increased drastically at this point.

In 1994, when Bakili Muluzi became president, he addressed the nation's need for a coordinated response to the HIV/AIDS epidemic. In 2000, Muluzi introduced another five-year policy known as the National Strategic Framework, but, like Banda's five-year World Bank Medium Term Plan, this plan was largely ineffective. In 2001, in response to problems within the National AIDS Control Programme established by Banda, Muluzi created the National AIDS Commission. Unlike Banda, who prevented the public from accessing information about the epidemic, Muluzi ensured that information about HIV/AIDS was available on the radio and television, in newspapers, and on billboards. However, despite Muluzi's efforts, HIV prevalence was already significantly influencing national agricultural productivity during this period, and Malawi experienced an AIDS-related nationwide famine in 2002.

Malawians gained access to antiretroviral drugs in 2003, and, with a donation from the Global Fund to Fight AIDS, Tuberculosis, and Malaria and the election of new President Bingu wa Mutharika in 2004, government interventions increased substantially. However, soon after his election, Mutharika experienced tensions with Muluzi after implementing an anti-corruption program, which distracted the government from addressing the nation's food and HIV/AIDS-related crises. Despite these obstacles, Mutharika successfully developed a National AIDS Policy and appointed a Principal Secretary for HIV/AIDS during his presidency.

== Awareness and risk perception ==
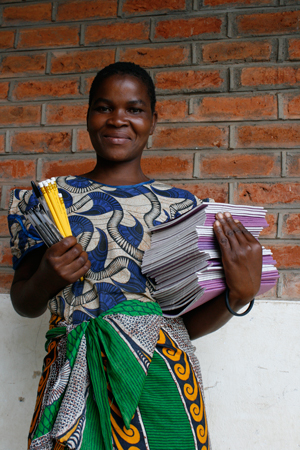
Partners in Health worker with disease treatment literature in Malawi

Despite Malawi's limited health and educational infrastructure, knowledge regarding HIV/AIDS is high among many people living in both urban and rural Malawi. According to a 2004 study by Barden-O'Fallon et al. involving 100 households, women in Malawi are most likely to learn about HIV/AIDS through radio and television, health workers at local clinics, and female members of their social networks. Men are also likely to access information about HIV/AIDS through radio and television; however, unlike women, they are not likely to gain information about HIV/AIDS from their male friends. When 57 Malawian men were interviewed in 2003, 100% of them said they had heard about the HIV/AIDS epidemic on the radio, and 84.2% of them said they had learned about HIV/AIDS during their visits to local health facilities; this supports the fact that many people in Malawi have access to information about the epidemic, both through the radio and other sources. However, this is not a universal sentiment; there are indicators that HIV knowledge is not that high and is comparable to other countries in Sub-Saharan Africa, and that there is a socio-economic knowledge gap.

Personal traits such as age, gender, location, and education correlate, either positively or negatively, with HIV/AIDS awareness levels. For example, older women have demonstrated higher levels of knowledge regarding HIV/AIDS than younger women in Malawi. Because men typically have greater access to education and other social resources, they are often more knowledgeable about HIV prevention and transmission than women. While men are, on average, able to list 2.2 ways to prevent HIV transmission, women are only able to list 1.5 ways. Only 38% of women surveyed in 2003-2004 understood that their husbands would be less likely to contract HIV if they used condoms during intercourse with prostitutes and other women from high-risk groups. In addition, men who are raised in urban environments are, on average, more informed about HIV/AIDS than men who are raised in rural environments, presumably because urban children typically have greater access to educational resources than rural children. Among both men and women, higher levels of education correspond to increased knowledge about HIV/AIDS: men and women who have received secondary school educations are significantly more likely to understand complex aspects of the disease, such as the fact that people who appear healthy can still be HIV-positive, than those who have not. Finally, people who have lost friends or family members to the disease are likely to have greater knowledge about HIV/AIDS due to their personal, firsthand exposure to the problem.

The aforementioned study by Barden-O'Fallon et al., which surveyed 940 women and 661 men, indicated that, despite their knowledge and awareness, many people in Malawi do not feel personally susceptible to HIV infection. On average, only 23% of the adults who were surveyed during this study, both male and female, believed that they were likely to contract HIV and die of AIDS. Greater HIV/AIDS awareness among men does not seem to correspond with increased perceived risk; on the other hand, increased levels of knowledge about HIV/AIDS do correlate positively to perceived risk among women. Another study conducted in rural Malawi between 1998 and 2001 by Kirsten P. Smith et al. indicated that concerns about personal vulnerability to HIV/AIDS declined during this four-year time frame, probably because the increased use of preventive strategies gave people a sense of control. In fact, many participants in this study claimed that they were "not at all worried" about HIV/AIDS; unless they had simply adopted a fatalistic standpoint towards the epidemic, these respondents probably felt that they had successfully reduced their risk of exposure through personal behavioral changes.

== Education ==
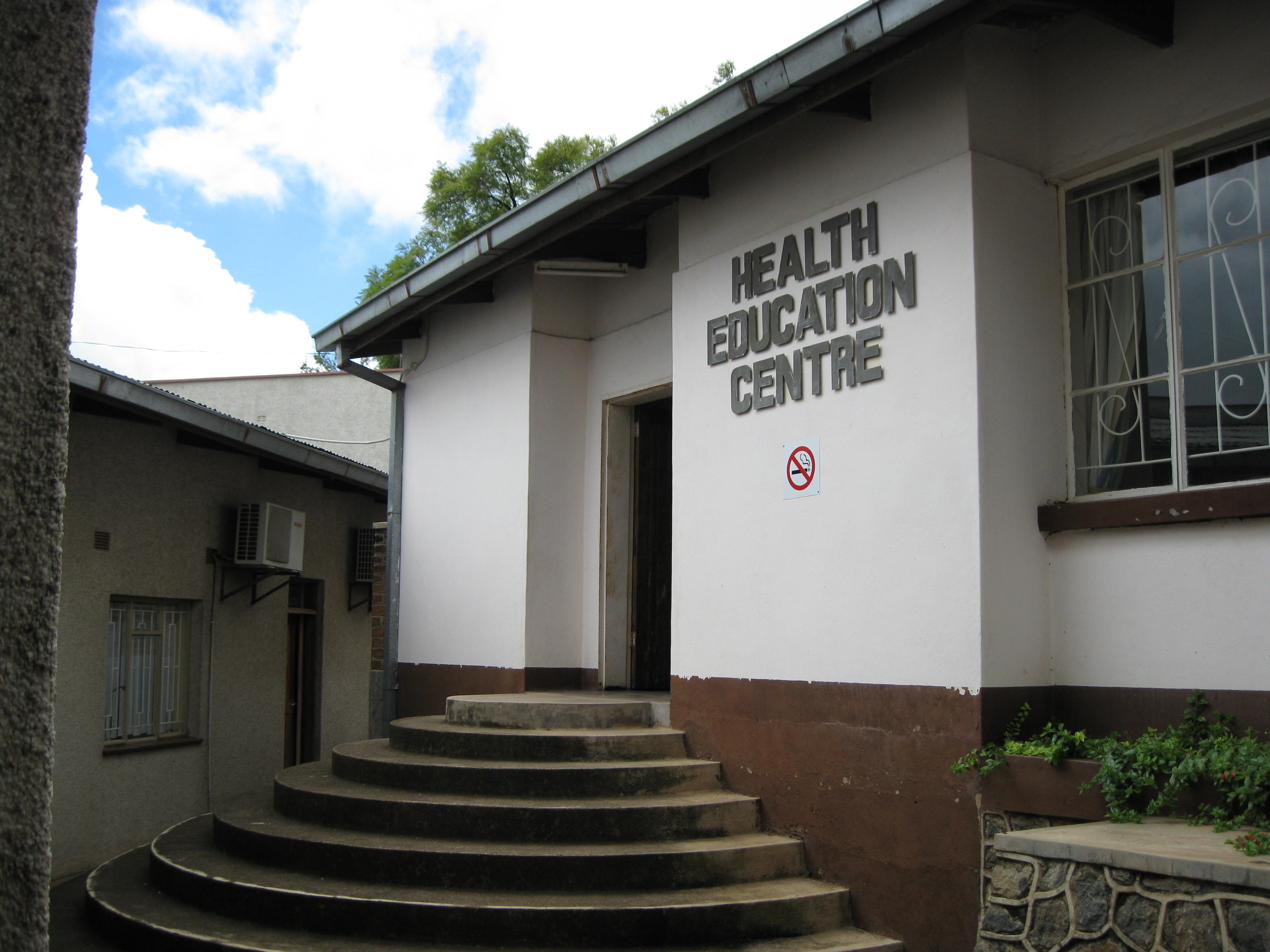
Health Education Center in Blantyre, Malawi

Students in Malawi have expressed high levels of dissatisfaction regarding the HIV/AIDS-related education and support they receive at school. According to a survey of students in Malawi, most secondary students do not believe that the HIV/AIDS curricula at their schools provide them with an adequate understanding of the disease. Although the Malawian government and non-governmental organizations have conducted many campaigns to improve awareness about HIV/AIDS in schools, there is still a significant shortage of age-appropriate audio and visual educational materials relating to HIV/AIDS available to instructors, particularly in rural areas. In addition, most teachers cannot identify the students in their classes who have been personally affected by the epidemic, either through friends or relatives, which suggests that school-based support for HIV/AIDS is minimal. However, despite this lack of support, surveys indicate that children who have been affected by the epidemic do not usually experience HIV/AIDS-based discrimination at school.

Most teachers are required to address HIV/AIDS in their curricula; although instructors are, for the most part, committed to helping their students understand and avoid the disease, they face many obstacles that prevent them from informing their students about HIV/AIDS in productive ways. For example, some teachers cannot advise their students to remain faithful to their sexual partners without seeming hypocritical because they engage in extramarital sexual relations themselves. Others feel uncomfortable discussing sexual matters with their students, and some believe that, due to their limited training, they are not knowledgeable enough about HIV/AIDS to direct classroom discussions about the disease. In addition, many teachers feel unsupported by community members, who often either deny the extent of the epidemic or believe that HIV/AIDS should not be addressed in the classroom.

== Affected groups ==
Although the HIV/AIDS epidemic has affected men, women, and children in Malawi, certain factors such as sexual orientation, gender, and age influence infection patterns. In Malawi, HIV/AIDS is usually transmitted through heterosexual sex, but the epidemic has also significantly impacted the homosexual male population in Malawi. In addition, women in Malawi are more likely to be HIV-positive than men, suggesting that women are particularly vulnerable to HIV/AIDS. Finally, the disease has affected children and young adults both directly and indirectly; 170,000 Malawian children were HIV-positive in 2011, and the number of orphans in Malawi has increased dramatically since the epidemic began in 1985.

=== Men ===
Due to the vast scope of the HIV/AIDS epidemic, many Malawian men believe that HIV contraction and death from AIDS are inevitable. Older men in particular often claim that the HIV/AIDS epidemic is a punishment issued by God or other supernatural forces. Other men refer to their own irresponsible sexual behaviors when explaining why they believe that death from AIDS is inevitable. These men sometimes claim that unprotected sex is natural (and therefore necessary and good) when justifying their lack of condom use during sex with extramarital partners. Finally, some men identify as HIV-positive without having undergone testing for HIV, preferring to believe that they have already been infected so they can avoid adopting undesirable preventive measures such as condom use or strict fidelity. Because of these fatalistic beliefs, many men continue engaging in extramarital sexual relations despite the prevalence of HIV/AIDS in Malawi.

However, despite these widespread feelings of fatalism, some men believe that they can avoid HIV contraction by modifying their personal behaviors. Men who decide to change their behaviors to reduce their risk of infection are unlikely to use condoms consistently, particularly during marital intercourse; instead, they usually continue engaging in extramarital sexual relations, but alter the ways in which they choose their sexual partners. For example, before selecting extramarital sexual partners, men sometimes survey their peers to determine whether their potential partners are likely to have exposed themselves to the virus. Men who choose their sexual partners based on external appearances and peer recommendations often believe that women who violate traditional gender norms by, for example, wearing modern clothing are more likely to carry HIV, while young girls, who are perceived as sexually inexperienced, are considered "pure". Because of this perception, many people are concerned that schoolchildren in Malawi, particularly girls, are becoming exposed to the virus through sexual harassment or abuse by their instructors.

=== Women ===
According to traditional gender roles in Malawi, men operate primarily in the formal work sector and are responsible for supporting their families through paid labor, whereas women, who are valued for their domestic skills, are responsible for agricultural labor and care work; this gender-based division of labor decreases women's autonomy, thereby increasing their vulnerability to HIV/AIDS. Even within the home, women often lack bargaining power because they have limited access to education, formal employment, and other resources that could give them a sense of financial and personal independence. Women who are able to work in the formal sector typically earn significantly less money than men, even when they are completing the same tasks, making it difficult for them to elevate their status.

Many women are convinced that their husbands are putting their lives at risk by engaging in extramarital sexual relations without using protection; however, because of their secondary status, they are often unwilling to initiate discussions about HIV/AIDS in the home. Most women in Malawi do not view divorce as a viable option, even when their husbands are HIV-positive and refuse to protect them from the virus by wearing condoms during marital intercourse. Because they lack the education and training needed to seek gainful employment, women are not usually able to support themselves and their children outside of marriage without resorting to commercial sex work for money.

However, despite their vulnerability, some women in rural Malawi believe that they do, to a certain extent, have control over their own health and well-being. They tell their husbands that the HIV/AIDS epidemic has made sexual infidelity extremely dangerous and encourage them to refrain from engaging in extramarital sexual contact. In addition, many women are convinced that, by appealing to the vulnerability of their children (who will probably be orphaned if their parents contract HIV), they can convince their husbands to use condoms consistently during extramarital sexual encounters. Other women seek support from their friends and family members when they believe that their husbands' unsafe behaviors are putting their lives at risk. Finally, as a last resort, women might warn their husbands that they will visit the ankhoswe, or traditional marriage counselor, and demand divorce if their husbands refuse to remain faithful and actively prevent the transmission of the disease.

=== Children ===
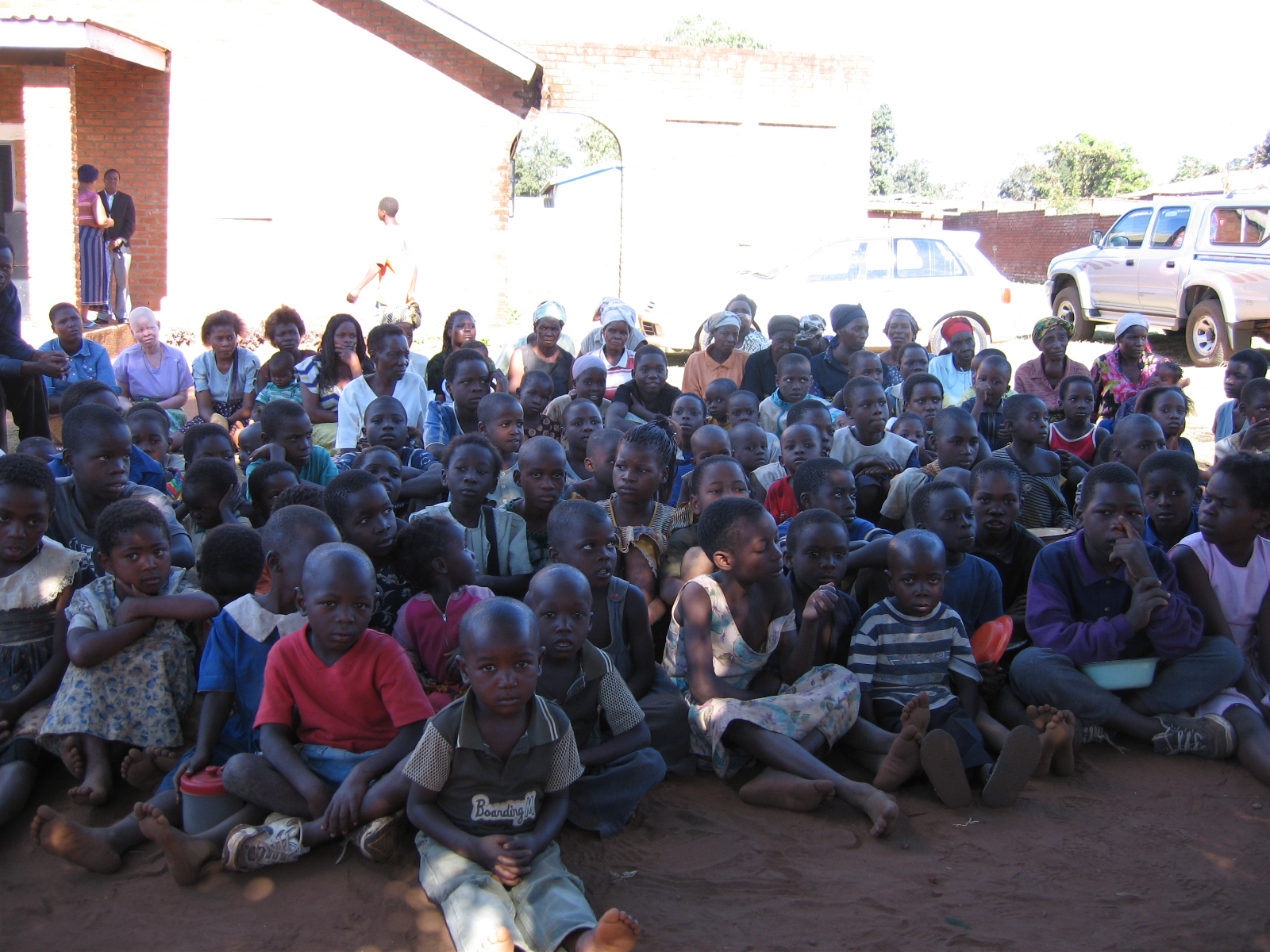
AIDS orphans in Lilongwe, Malawi

The number of orphaned children in Malawi has increased dramatically since the HIV/AIDS epidemic began in 1985, with certain surveys indicating that more than 35% of schoolchildren have experienced the death of at least one parent due to HIV/AIDS. Because HIV is transmitted sexually, married couples who engage in unprotected sexual relations put their children at increased risk of becoming double orphans, or children who have lost both parents to HIV/AIDS. Older children who have lost both parents to HIV/AIDS often become responsible for the care of their younger siblings, and many double orphans drop out of school or migrate to urban areas to try to support themselves and their siblings. Girls who have been orphaned by HIV/AIDS have unusually high rates of school absenteeism in Malawi.

When parents die of HIV/AIDS, extended family members usually become the children's primary caregivers: in Malawi, 44% of double orphans are adopted by grandparents or other close relatives. Extended family members often provide crucial support to HIV/AIDS orphans; however, some sources indicate that extended family members mistreat orphans whose parents have died from HIV/AIDS. For example, family members who are unable to support adopted children often arrange early marriages for female orphans, who may then become victims of domestic violence and sexual abuse.

Evidence suggests that schoolchildren in Malawi are at risk of being exposed to HIV by their teachers, who sometimes value them as sexual partners because they believe that children have not yet been exposed to the virus. Children are particularly vulnerable to exploitation by adults who offer them money in exchange for sex; because they are often unable to afford basic necessities, they might feel compelled to accept gifts in exchange for sex out of desperation. Interviews indicate that teachers and school administrators in Malawi often misinterpret the definition of sexual assault, as some believe that sexual relations between teachers and students are appropriate as long as the children have consented. Although most schools have strict policies against sexual abuse, children are often hesitant to accuse adults of wrongdoing, and many administrators are unwilling or unable to investigate the truth behind the accusations.

== Marriage and relationships ==
Although couples are starting to use condoms during extramarital intercourse more frequently, condom use during marital sex is still viewed as inappropriate by many Malawians; in 2000, only 2.3% of people reported using condoms regularly during sexual intercourse with their spouses. Some people believe that condoms are only necessary during sex with high-risk partners such as sex workers, and that condom use during marital sex implies infidelity. Others believe that marital condom use violates the religious purposes of marriage: sexual pleasure and reproduction. In a study published in 2007 by Agnes M. Chimbiri, men claimed that they use condoms with their wives for the sake of avoiding unwanted pregnancies; on the other hand, they were more concerned about sexually transmitted infections when discussing condom use with extramarital sexual partners.

Many different sources of information can motivate discussion about HIV/AIDS among married couples. After hearing information about HIV/AIDS at local health facilities or during conversations with friends or family members, people are more likely to address the risk of HIV contraction with their spouses. In addition, women are more likely than men to mention the dangers of HIV/AIDS when they suspect that their spouses are engaging in extramarital sexual relations. According to a 2003 study by Eliya Msiyaphazi Zulu and Gloria Chepngeno, although higher levels of education do correspond to greater knowledge about HIV/AIDS, education levels do not significantly impact the likelihood that couples will discuss HIV-related prevention strategies.

== Economic impact ==
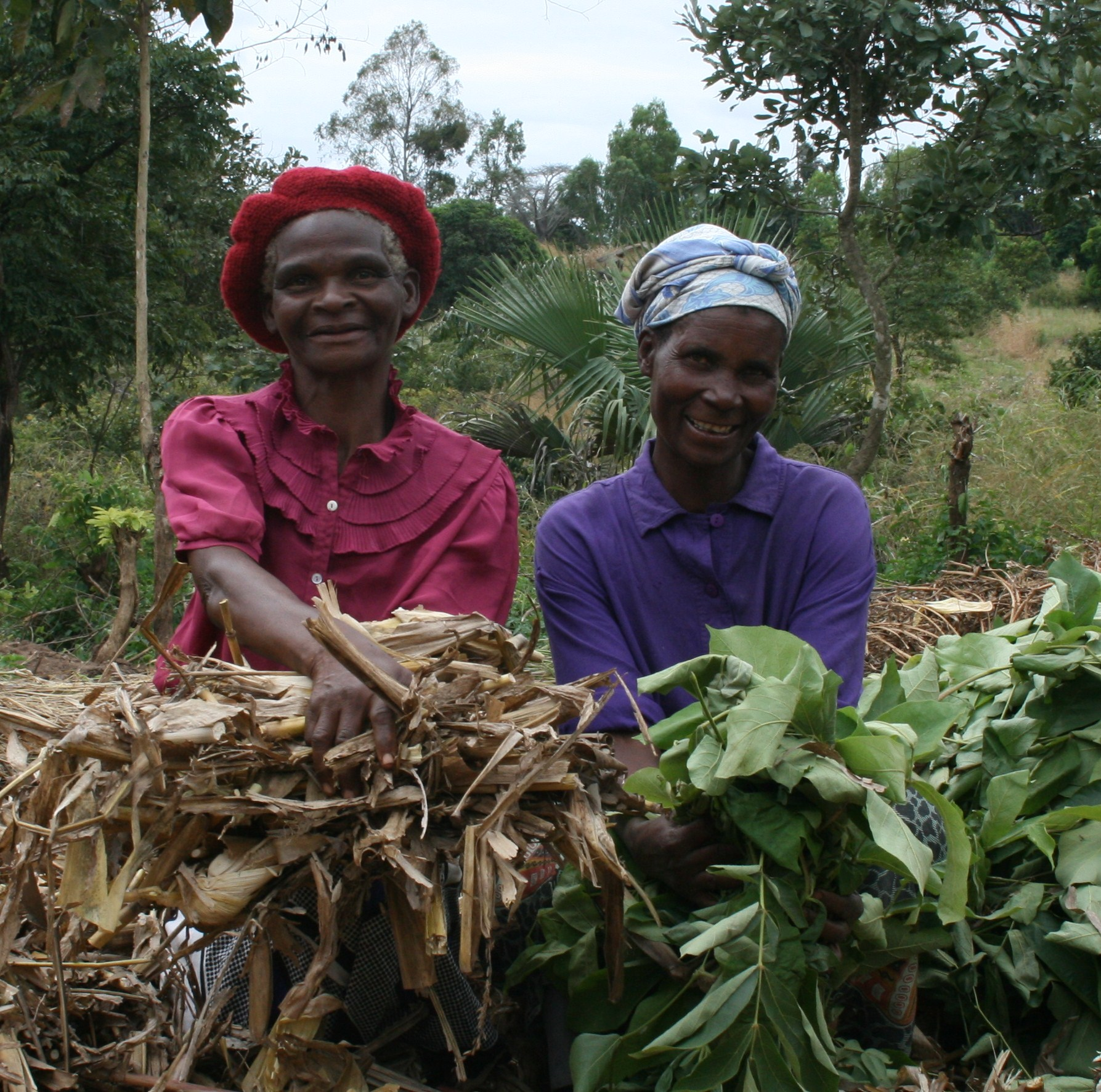
Farmers with composting materials in Malawi

A 2002 study conducted by CARE International across three districts in the Central Region of Malawi considers how HIV/AIDS has affected economic well-being in rural Malawi. When skilled laborers are infected with HIV, they are usually unable to work; therefore, they often shift agricultural production on their land to less labor-intensive crops, sacrificing the opportunity to grow more profitable, labor-intensive crops such as tobacco. When family members fall ill with HIV/AIDS, their relatives invest time in their treatment and care, further reducing household productivity. In addition, when family members are infected with HIV, households often use the money they would normally invest in agriculture to cover medical expenses, further decreasing economic stability at the household level. Finally, when adults contract HIV, their children often remain home from school to work in the fields, threatening long-term productivity and economic advancement in Malawi.

CARE International proposes several strategies that might reduce the destructive economic impact of HIV/AIDS on rural households. They recommend introducing new technologies that improve productivity to allow households affected by HIV/AIDS to continue supporting themselves through agriculture. Women in patrilineal/patrilocal villages are often unable to support themselves and their children when their husbands die of HIV/AIDS; therefore, helping women acquire traditionally masculine agricultural skills might decrease their vulnerability while improving agricultural productivity at the household and community levels. CARE International recommends increasing cooperation at the community level by establishing labor and food banks in areas that have been devastated by the HIV/AIDS epidemic. Finally, CARE International highlights the importance of increasing access to information about HIV/AIDS in Malawi to help families prepare for and cope with the economic burdens associated with the epidemic.

== Impact on health services ==
The HIV/AIDS epidemic in Malawi has been characterized by drastic declines in the number of health workers available to provide treatment and care and increasing strain on health services: more than half of all hospital admissions in Malawi are related to HIV/AIDS. However, Malawi currently faces a significant deficit in human resources: only 159 doctors were practicing in Malawi in 2007. The World Health Organization's Essential Health Package recommends placing at least three health workers at every health facility in the country, but the vast majority of Malawi's health facilities fail to meet this standard.

While migration to more developed countries in search of better opportunities, also known as "brain drain", is partially responsible for the shortage of health care workers in Malawi, many health care workers have been personally affected by the HIV/AIDS epidemic; in fact, an average of 48 nurses die of HIV/AIDS in Malawi every year. The HIV/AIDS epidemic has resulted in high levels of absenteeism among health workers in Malawi, who often leave work to spend time with HIV-positive friends or relatives, and the Malawian government has failed to respond to the declining number of full-time employees working in the health sector. Health workers who are not chronically absent frequently abandon their jobs because they are unable to cope with the heavy patient loads or because they are afraid that working in a medical environment will increase their risk of becoming infected with HIV.

Malawi has adopted task shifting strategies to overcome the shortage of workers available for HIV/AIDS treatment and care. Task shifting, which has been successful in many other regions, involves training less specialized health workers to perform health-related tasks that do not require professional training, such as the initiation of antiretroviral therapy. For example, at Thyolo District Hospital, health workers spend one week learning how to initiate antiretroviral therapy in a classroom setting and an additional two weeks practicing their knowledge in a supervised clinical setting; after completing this course, they are legally (under Ministry of Health guidelines) allowed to initiate antiretroviral therapy. Another form of task shifting involves training health-oriented counselors in HIV testing and counseling, which relieves nurses of this additional task.

== Interventions ==
Malawi has taken many steps towards slowing the spread of HIV/AIDS, such as increasing access to condoms and improving testing services and treatment options. Many of these efforts have been funded by international donors including the World Bank, the Global Fund, the World Health Organization (WHO), the President's Emergency Plan for AIDS Relief (PEPFAR), and the Joint United Nations Programme on HIV and AIDS (UNAIDS). The World Bank has lent $407.9 million to Malawi, the Global Fund has agreed to give $390 million, and PEPFAR has donated $25 million for prevention and treatment campaigns.

=== Antiretroviral therapy ===
The number of people using antiretroviral therapy in Malawi has increased dramatically in the past decade: between 2004 and 2011, an estimated 300,000 people gained access to antiretroviral treatment. In addition to improving access to antiretroviral therapy, in 2008, Malawi introduced the WHO's treatment guidelines for antiretroviral therapy, which improved the quality of treatment available to Malawians. However, Malawi's proposal for a new antiretroviral treatment plan in 2011, which would have cost $105 million per year, was rejected by the Global Fund, threatening Malawi's ability to continue expanding access to antiretroviral treatment.

In 2000, Malawi's Ministry of Health and Population began developing a plan to distribute antiretroviral drugs to the population, and, as of 2003, there were several sites providing antiretroviral drugs in Malawi. The Lighthouse, a trust in Lilongwe that fights HIV/AIDS, provides antiretroviral drugs at a cost of 2,500 kwacha per month. Queen Elizabeth Central Hospital in Blantyre provides antiretroviral therapy through its outpatient department, and Médecins Sans Frontières distributes antiretroviral drugs to patients for free in the Chiradzulu and Thyolo Districts. Many different private providers sell antiretroviral drugs, particularly in cities; however, very few patients can afford to receive drugs from the private sector in Malawi. In addition, private providers are not currently required to obtain certification before selling antiretroviral drugs, and, therefore, this practice is not closely monitored. Finally, some employees receive access to antiretroviral drugs through the health insurance policies provided by their employers, but this practice is not widespread.

Due to the advent of antiretroviral drugs, HIV/AIDS has become a manageable disease for people who can access and afford treatment; however, antiretroviral therapy remains largely unaffordable and inaccessible to most people in Malawi. For example, the South East region of Malawi has disproportionately low access to antiretroviral drugs. In many rural areas, poor health infrastructure combined with widespread famine have made sustained, high-quality antiretroviral therapy difficult or impossible. In addition, donations from the Global Fund to Fight AIDS, Tuberculosis, and Malaria were used to fund antiretroviral therapy programs that distributed medication on a "first-come, first-served" basis, making the drugs more accessible to the male, urban, educated population. Because there are no explicit policies regarding the fair distribution of antiretroviral drugs in Malawi, individual health care workers often become responsible for deciding who will receive treatment, which inevitably leads to inequitable distribution.

=== Condom distribution ===
Although condoms effectively prevent the sexual transmission of HIV, several factors have limited widespread condom distribution and uptake in Malawi. People living in non-urban areas often have difficulty accessing condoms, and condoms are not typically available at bars and other social locations where they could have a significant impact on HIV prevention. Many people oppose condoms because they believe that condoms make sex less enjoyable or because they question their ability to prevent the transmission of HIV. However, despite these factors, many unmarried couples have started using condoms more consistently as concern and fear about the HIV/AIDS epidemic have increased.

Non-governmental organizations such as Population Services International (Malawi), an organization that strives to improve the health of Malawians, and Banja La Mtsogolo, an organization that distributes information and resources related to family planning, have conducted campaigns advertising condom use as an effective form of protection against HIV/AIDS. Banja La Mtsogolo provides condoms to both men and women, and has significantly improved the availability of condoms for women in particular. Because of efforts by Population Services International, Banja La Mtsogolo, and many other organizations, condoms have become more widely available to many people in Malawi.

=== Voluntary counseling and testing ===
People living in areas with high rates of HIV/AIDS face several psychological barriers when deciding whether to undergo testing for HIV. For example, people may prefer not to know if they are HIV-positive because, due to the obstacles they often face in gaining access to antiretroviral drugs, many view HIV/AIDS diagnoses as death sentences. Others may simply believe that they are HIV-negative, either because they practice strict monogamy and consistently use condoms during sexual intercourse or because they are in denial about the prevalence of the disease. However, despite these barriers, both mobile and static testing services have become more widely available in Malawi recently: 1,392 testing and counseling sites existed in 2011. Certain non-governmental organization such as the Malawi AIDS Counseling and Resource Organisation (MACRO) provide door-to-door counseling and testing services, which have drastically improved the accessibility of HIV testing.

== See also ==
- Sub-Saharan Africa
- HIV/AIDS in Africa
- Diseases of poverty
- Epidemiology of HIV/AIDS
- Misconceptions about HIV and AIDS
- AIDS orphan
- Healthcare in Malawi
- Sex for Fish
