= Mzimba District Hospital =

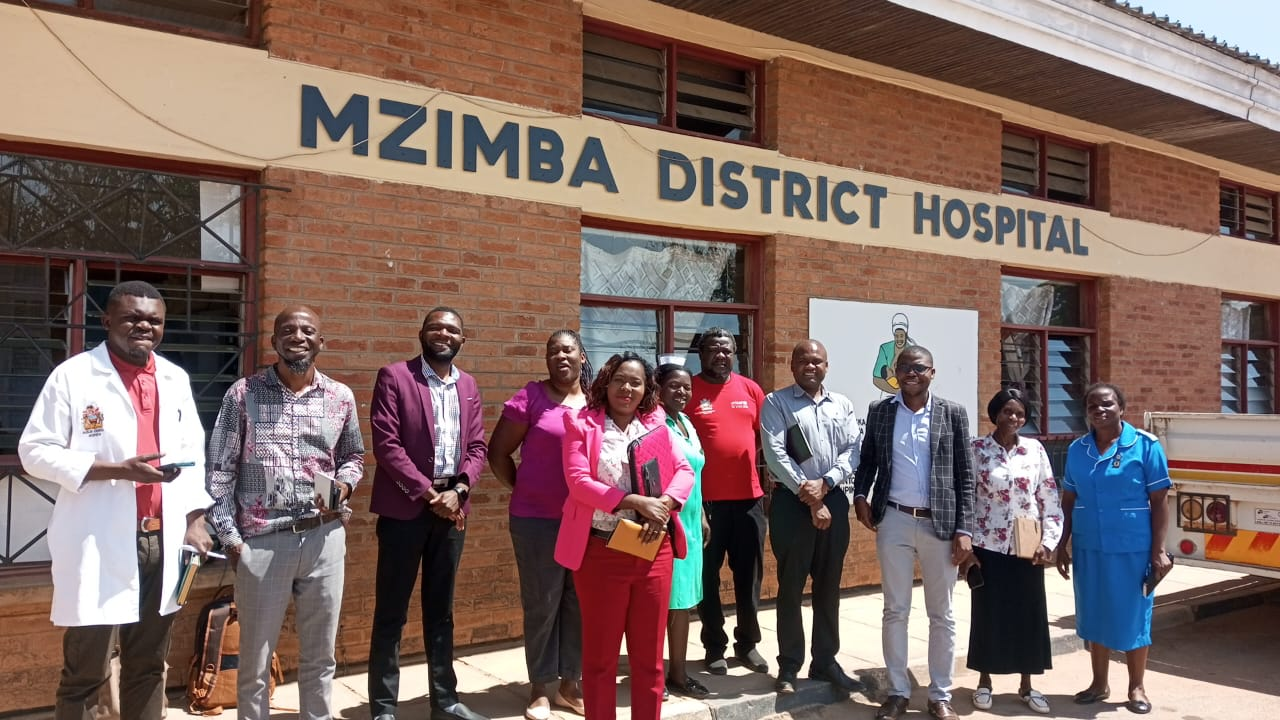
- The hospital in 2024. Left: Dr Angel Mwaungulu, District medical officer; Dr Prince Chirwa, the director of health and social services for the Mzimba District is second from the right

Geography
- Location: Mzimba District, Malawi
- Coordinates: 11°53′55″S 33°35′04″E

Organisation
- Care system: Public

Links
- Lists: Hospitals in Malawi

Mzimba District Hospital is a referral center in Mzimba South, Malawi. It serves over 30 posts and health centers in the Mzimba South District.

== Description ==
The hospital was commissioned two years after the planned date in August 1992. Work continued for some time, fixing design issues. It is the referral hospital for over 30 health posts and centers in the Mzimba South District. Since 2025, the health worker and midwife service visiting rural areas has been improved by the donation of over 50 bicycles. The service covers a large area with a sparse population that has no access to electricity. Patients can be seen more frequently as time is saved by not having to walk up to 20 km to visit them. Expectant mothers who might have been seen twice a month can now be seen three times a week.

In 2024, the hospital received a K70 million donation from the World Emergency Relief and the Malawi Project of urgent medical supplies. The supplies included beds and mattresses. The donation would be shared between hospital departments and health centres in the area.

The community owns a shelter that can be used by relatives waiting for their family member at the hospital. The shelter has only one shared toilet, and the Mzimba District Health Management Committee saw this as a continuing concern in 2025.

In 2025, the Water Employees Trade Union of Malawi funded their younger workers to carry out K7 million in repairs to the hospital's 33-year-old system. The repairs are expected to lower the hospital's high monthly water bill (K6 million).

The hospital's District Nursing and Midwifery Officer, Beatrice Kalua, reassured parents during a campaign in March 2026 to vaccinate children against polio. A four-day campaign was targeting 189,000 local children who were under ten to protect them from the deaths and disabilities caused by polio.
