= Nkhoma Mission Hospital =

Malawian hospital

Coordinates: 14.0436°S 34.1°E

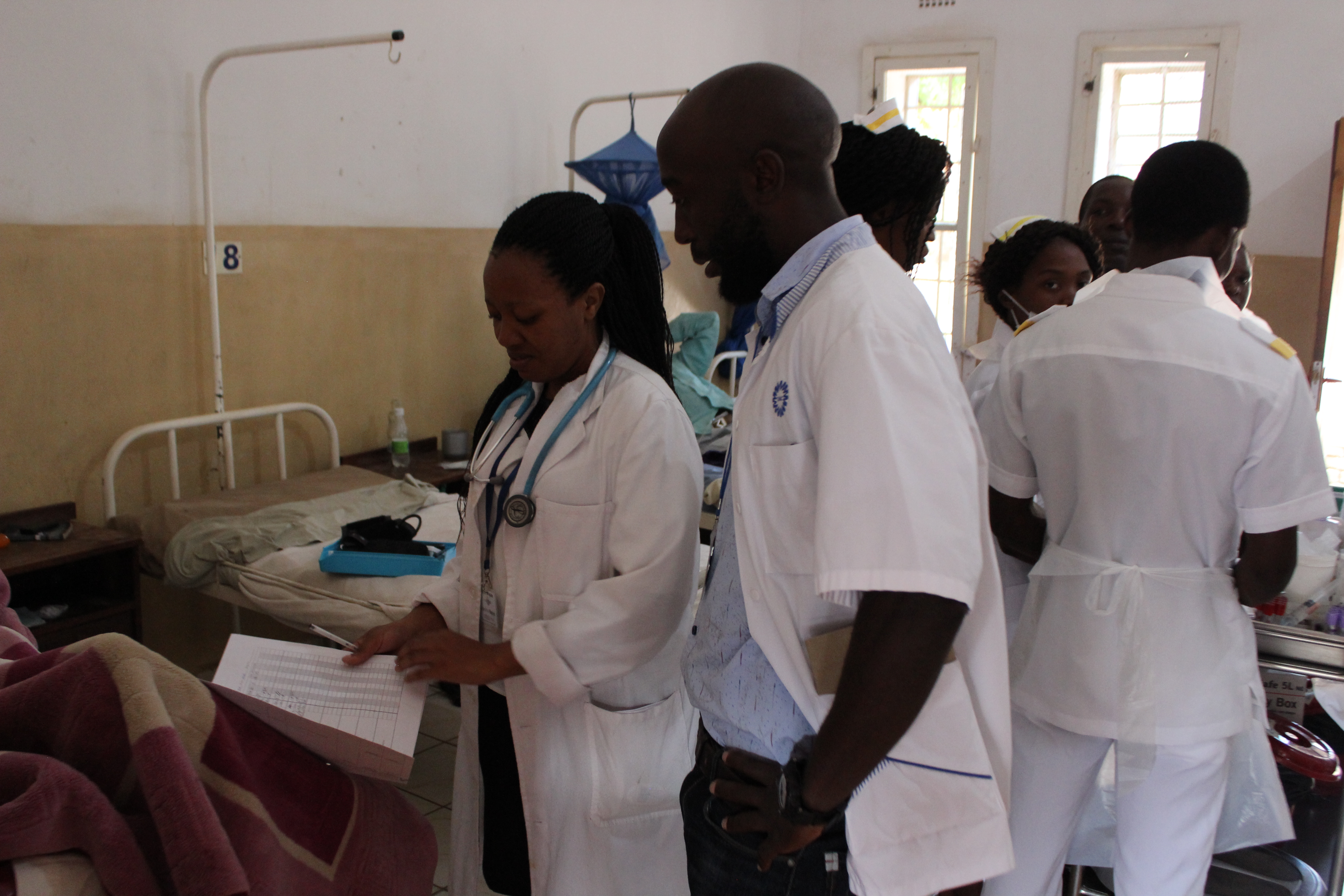
- Doctor's discussing a patient

- Location of Nkhoma

Geography
- Location: Nkhoma, Central, Malawi

Services
- Beds: c.250

History
- Founded: 1915; 111 years ago

Links
- Lists: Hospitals in Malawi
- Other links: List of hospitals in Malawi

Nkhoma Mission Hospital was founded in 1915 by missionaries from Scotland and South Africa. It is in the Lilongwe District. It has grown to be a hospital with about 250 beds with operating theatres, maternity and ophthalmic facilities.

== History ==
It was created in 1915 as part of the mission in Nkhoma. It was initially housed in a few huts and its staff was based around one missionary doctor who had taken a course in tropical medicine.

In 2015 the hospital was reporting that three mothers had died during childbirth. This was a considerable improvement as 31 had died in 2007.

By about 2012 the hospital had around 250 beds. The closest referral hospital is Kamuzu Central Hospital in Lilongwe. In 2013 a grant by the Scottish government allowed Heather Cubie and Christine Campbell to establish a screening programme for cervical cancer based at this hospital. This cancer was prevalent in Malawi accounting for nearly half of all cancers and it achieved an 80% mortality. The programme was managed by Beatrice Kabata in 2016 when they had completed 15,000 tests.

In 2019, the hospital's staff spent three days away from the hospital to put together a five-year plan together with new targets to improve the hospital's care.
