= List of hospitals in Malawi =

This is a list of hospitals in Malawi.

== National hospitals ==
- Malawi National Cancer Center

== Central hospitals ==
These hospitals serve as Regional Referral Hospitals for the District Hospitals.

- Blantyre Central Hospital
- Kamuzu Central Hospital
- Mzuzu Central Hospital
- Zomba Central Hospital

== District hospitals ==
The district hospitals serve as referral hospitals for the health centres in their districts.

- Chitipa District Hospital
- Karonga District Hospital
- Mzimba District Hospital
- Nkhata Bay District Hospital
- Rumphi District Hospital
- Dedza District Hospital
- Dowa District Hospital
- Kasungu District Hospital
- Bwaila Hospital
- Mchinji District Hospital
- Nkhokota District Hospital
- Ntcheu District Hospital
- Ntchisi District Hospital
- Salima District Hospital
- Balaka District Hospital
- Chikwawa District Hospital
- Chiradzulu District Hospital
- Machinga District Hospital
- Mangochi District Hospital
- Mulanje District Hospital
- Mwanza District Hospital
- Nsanje District Hospital
- Phalombe District Hospital
- Thyolo District Hospital
- Zomba District Hospital

== Private specialized hospitals ==
- Mercy James Institute for Pediatric Surgery and Intensive Care
- International Blantyre Cancer Centre

== Other private hospitals ==
The following are some of the private hospitals in Malawi.

- Discovery Imaging Centre
- Beit Cure International Hospital, Blantyre
- Shifa Hospital, Blantyre
- Billy Riordan Memorial Clinic, Chembe (Cape McLear)
- Blantyre Adventist Hospital, Blantyre
- Blessings Hospital, Lumbadzi
- Care Polyclinic Limited, Lilongwe
- Mlambe Mission Hospital, Lunzu, Blantyre
- CCK Health Clinic & Diagnostic Centre, Lilongwe
- Chitawira Private Hospital, Blantyre
- Daeyang Luke Hospital, Lilongwe
- David Gordon Memorial Hospital, Salima
- Dr YB Mlombe Pvt Clinic, Chilinde 2, Lilongwe
- Francisco Palau Hospital, Lilongwe
- Gulf Medical College Hospital, Blantyre
- Holy Family Mission Hospital, Phalombe
- Malamulo Hospital, Thyolo
- Medicare Hospital, Blantyre
- Mlolera Women's Health Clinic Limited, Lilongwe
- Montfort Hospital, Nchalo
- Mulanje Mission Hospital, Mulanje
- Mtengo Umodzi Private Hospital, Blantyre
- Mwaiwathu Private Hospital, Blantyre
- Nkhoma Mission Hospital, Lilongwe
- Nyambadwe Private Hospital, Blantyre
- St. Annies Mission Hospital, Karonga
- St. Joseph Hospital (Ludzi Hospital), Mchinji
- St. Joseph's Hospital, Limbe
- St. Luke's Hospital, Zomba
- St. Martin’s Mission Hospital, Malindi
- Wemaht Private Hospital, Blantyre.
