= Olivia Giles =

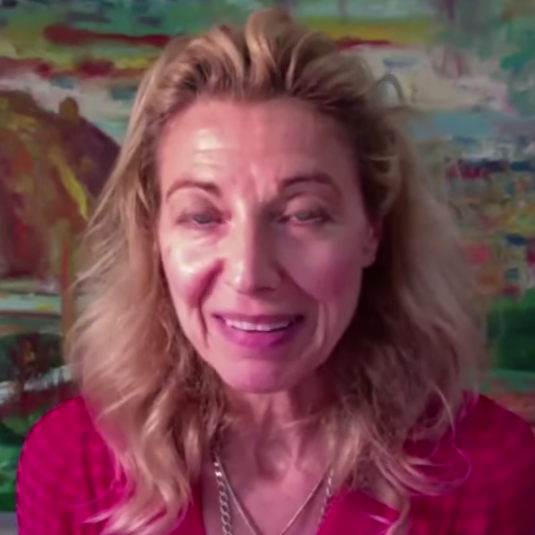
- in 2021 (video by the Scotland Malawi Partnership)
- Born: 1965 (age 60–61)
- Education: Glasgow University
- Occupations: lawyer and charity CEO
- Employer: 500 Miles
- Known for: quadruple amputee and charity founder

Olivia Giles OBE (born 1965) is the founder and chief executive officer of the Scottish charity "500 Miles". She was a lawyer until in 2007, following a life-changing surgery, she founded a charity to fund prosthetic limbs for people in Malawi and Zambia. She helped to create the Lilongwe Institute of Orthopaedics and Neurosurgery in Malawi's capital city Lilongwe.

== Life ==
Giles was born in about 1968 and she trained as a lawyer at the University of Glasgow. After she graduated she became a workaholic property lawyer looking after the conveyancing of properties in Scotland. Her life changed when she noticed a rash on her feet after a medical check-up found her well. Within hours she was told that she had meningococcal septicaemia, and the only cure was to amputate her hands and feet. She was cared for by the Edinburgh surgeon Awf Quaba and he found that he was able to save her elbow and knee joints.

Giles reported that she felt good when she came round after the surgery, realising that she was lucky to be alive. She was soon fitted with prosthetic feet which enabled her to learn how to walk again. She began a recovery, but she realised that she would never be able to be a full-time lawyer as she had been before. She was unimpressed when she saw her first prosthetic leg which ended in a man's shoe, but legs were created for her even though no one knew if she would be able to walk again. She says that she vomited the first time that she stood up as her body had forgotten how to be vertical.

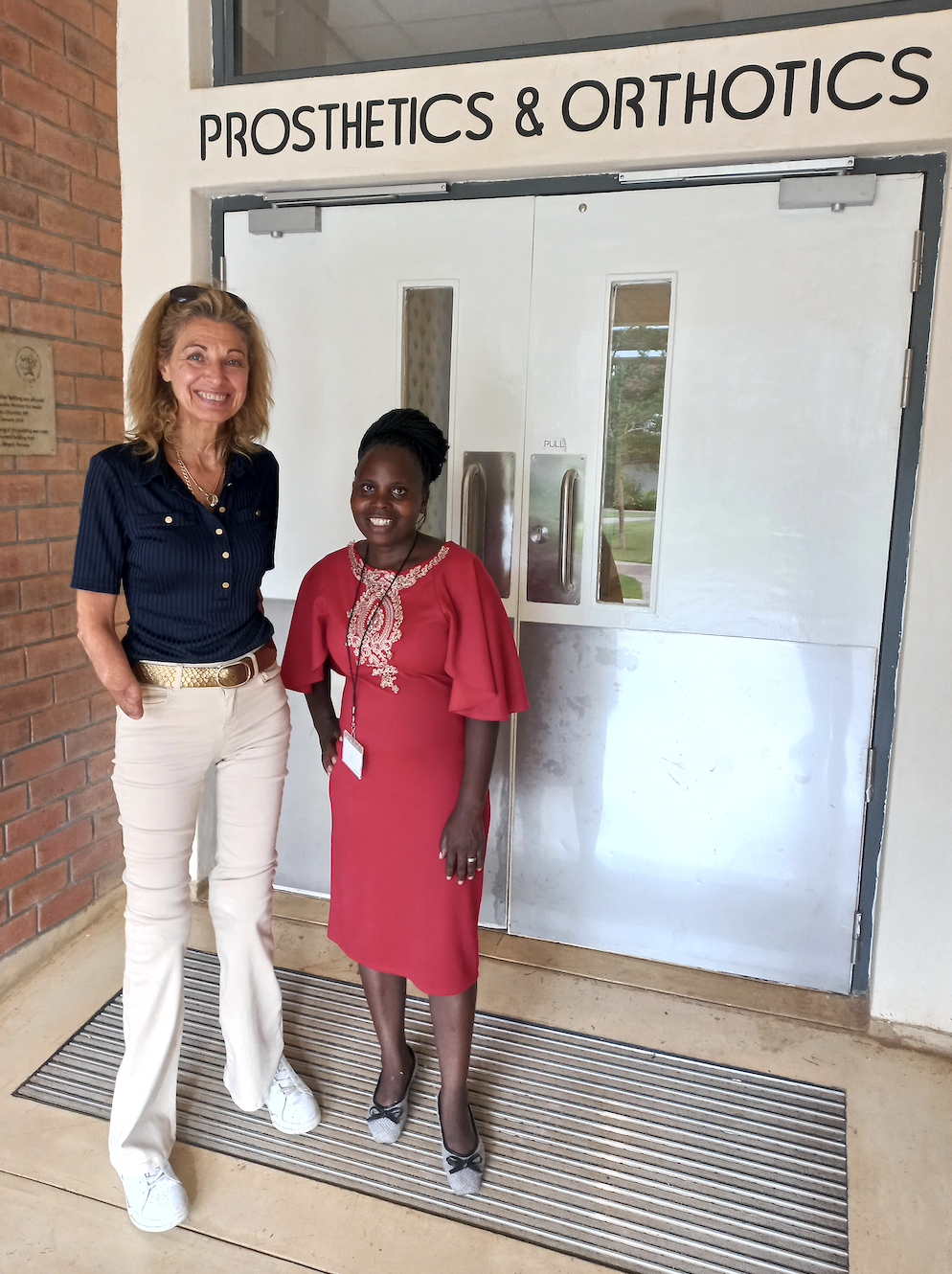
Olivia Giles and Benadeta Singini in Lilongwe in 2025.

In 2007 she decided to raise money and she another quadruple amputee Jamie Andrew created a charity named 500 Miles named after the song. They were given permission to use the name by The Proclaimers. The charity was launched to fund "prosthetic care abroad". She visited Malawi and saw the pitiful site of a man crawling down the street because he had a lost a leg. Giles realised that it was only prosthetic limbs that were preventing her from the indignity of also crawling around the streets of Edinburgh. Giles most valued items are Velcro straps that enable her to use cutlery and a pen. She was there to oversee the building of the 500 Miles prosthetics and orthotics centre at Lilongwe's main hospital. The centre opened in Easter 2009 after construction by a Glasgow firm funded by the Lord provost of Glasgow that was based on shipping containers. By the end of the year the new facility was turning out 40 or 50 devices a month.

In 2007 she was awarded an honorary degree. She was voted to be the Evening Times Scotland's Woman of the Year.

Giles was awarded an OBE by Queen Elizabeth II in 2010. She is a frequent public speaker. By 2015 the unit in Lilongwe was manufacturing about 100 devices a month and she was awarded the Robert Burns Humanitarian Award.

Giles and her charity have been involved with the Lilongwe Institute of Orthopaedics and Neurosurgery (LION) since its inception. It began in a shipping container in the grounds of Kamazu Central Hospital in Lilongwe. LION provides free orthopaedic and neurological surgery. In 2025 it also had beds for private patients.

In 2025 she went to Lilongwe where her unit was transferred to the management of the Ministry of Health on 31 March with an assurance the 500 Miles charity would continue to assist with its running costs.

== Other awards ==
In 2004 she raised £450,000 and she was declared the Evening Times Scotswoman of the Year and the "Volunteer Fundraiser of the Year" according to the Institute of Fundraising Scotland. In the following year she became a Rotary International Paul Harris Fellow.
