= Healthcare in Malawi =

Healthcare in Malawi and its limited resources are inadequate to fully address factors plaguing the population, including infant mortality and the very high burden of diseases, especially HIV/AIDS, malaria and tuberculosis.

== Background ==
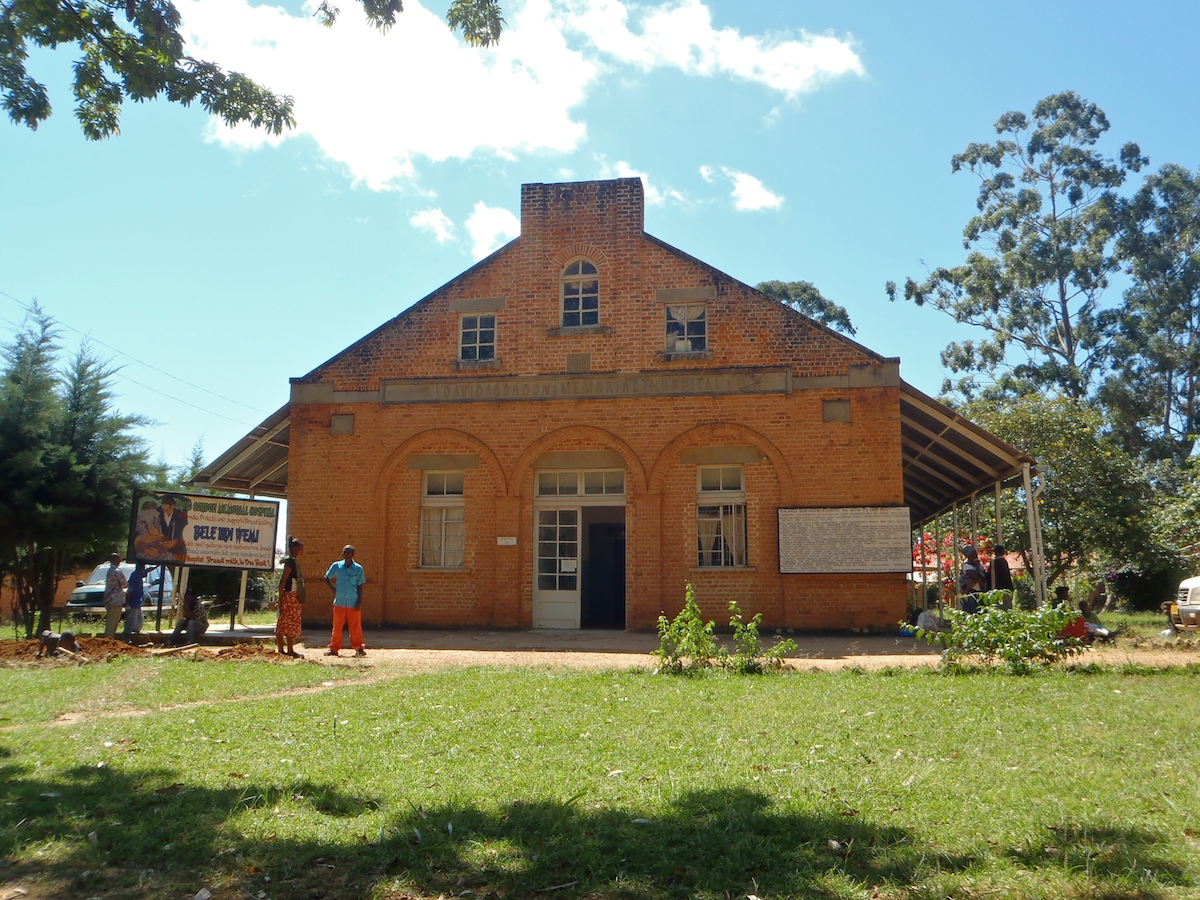
David Gordon Memorial Hospital in Livingstonia

Malawi has a three-tier healthcare system in which each level is connected by a patient referral system. However, the health system structure exists in publications only where it mirrors national health systems in the West although just like other systems in Malawi, it does not function as stated. This is largely due to lack of manpower, lack of basic/expert skills set, overpopulation, lack of equipment/technology, corruption, lack of political commitment, lack of sufficient funds, poor prioritisation in budgeting and low motivation among personnel.

According to a World Health Organization Report, Malawi health system ranks number 185 out of 190. There is no public emergency systems in place for medical services, fire service or crime response (no ambulated paramedic response system, as in a 112 or 999 service). There are very few privately run hospitals in the two major cities of Blantyre and Lilongwe. They have very limited non purposely built vehicles without life-saving equipment on board or an on-board paramedic.

In April 2012, the then State President had a cardiac arrest which resulted in his death due to lack of medication both within the presidential medical team and at the main referral hospital. As of 2016, Malawi has only one qualified cardiologist consultant who is based at a private hospital. Surveys indicate that, unlike in cases of HIV, Malaria, or TB, patients with diseases which require expert clinical skills and equipment, e.g. cardiac or neural related problems, are likely to receive a wrong diagnosis and incorrect treatment or medication resulting to in unnecessarily high mortality rates. There is no provider of aeromedical service within Malawi.

Malawi has the lowest ranking on health system among countries which are not affected by civil wars, and the medical services delivered still rank lower than some war torn countries. There is no national record information system for patient records. Most common medication sfound in hospital pharmacies in the West are not available locally, i.e. treatment for the heart diseases or cancer are unavailable. There is an uncontrolled circulation of internationally banned drugs or out-of-date drugs in flea markets.

Below is an outline of how the health system is meant to work as published by the Malawi's government.

== Health services ==
Health services in Malawi are provided by the public, private for profit (PFP), and private not for profit (PNFP) sectors. The Ministry of Health (MOH) is responsible for overseeing healthcare in Malawi.

63% of health services are provided by the government, 37% are provided by the Christian Health Association of Malawi (CHAM), and a small fraction of the population receive health services through the private sector. Private doctors and non-governmental organizations (NGOs) offer services and medicines for a nominal fee.

== Public sector ==
Public sector provision of health care is free and organised into three tiers- primary, secondary and tertiary. A system of referrals links these three tiers.

Government departments that provide public services are the Ministry of Health (MOH), district, town and city councils, Ministry of Defence and Ministry of Internal Affairs and Public Security (Police and Prisons). These departments work in collaboration with the MOH; however respective funding is planned and disbursed individually.

Patients enter into the system at the first tier (primary) and flow to higher tier facilities (secondary, tertiary) as needed. Medical supplies and human resources, however, flow in the opposite direction. The already limited resources are first allocated to the top tier facilities, leaving the second and third tier facilities with little to no resources.

=== Primary care ===
Primary care is "where the bulk of health care actually happens in Malawi". This consists of community-based outreach, staffed and unstaffed health posts, dispensaries, urban health centres, and primary health centres (including rural/community hospitals). At the primary level (third tier), hospitals have holding beds, post-natal beds, holding wards, and are able to provide outpatient, maternity, and antenatal services.

If the patient's condition is considered to be too critical for primary care facilities to handle, they will be referred to the next level of the healthcare system.

=== Secondary care ===
Secondary level care is provided by one of 26 district hospitals that are located in each of Malawi's districts. These hospitals are equipped to provide the same basic services as the primary care facilities (mentioned above) in addition to a few more, such as: x-ray, ambulance, operating theatre, and a laboratory.

=== Tertiary care ===
The top tier of care is provided by one of four central hospitals located in the major urban areas. These hospitals differ from the secondary care hospitals in the existence of various specialized services.

== Health budget ==
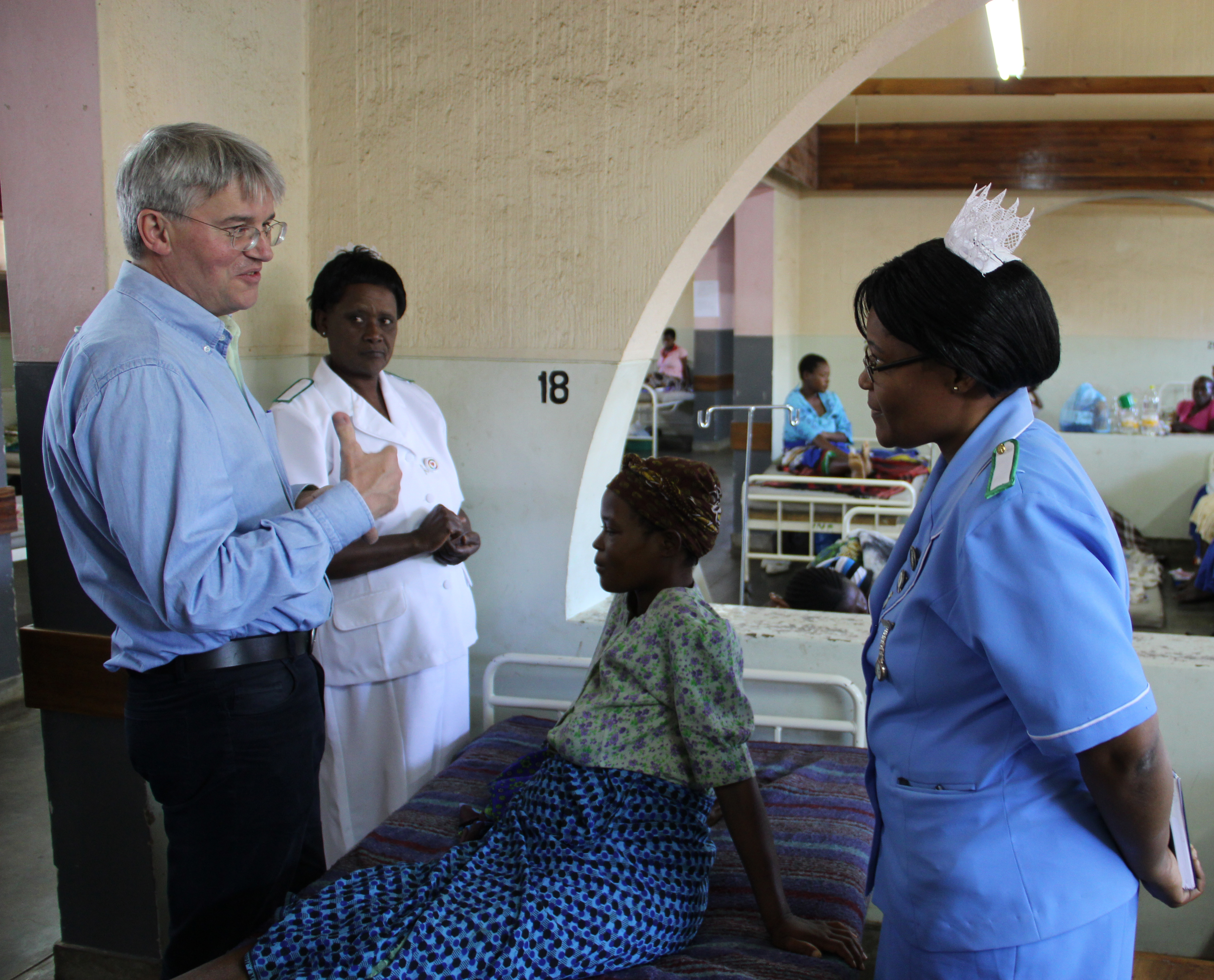
Andrew Mitchell, British Secretary of State for International Development, visiting a midwifery unit in Malawi

According to the World Health Organization's statistics on Malawi, there was an increase in health expenditures from 2002 to 2011, when the per capital total expenditure on health (PPP int.) increased from $27.2 to $77.0 and per capita government expenditure on health (PPP int.) increased from $16.4 to $56.5. These statistics indicate that the healthcare in Malawi is receiving greater attention and resource allocation. They also reflect the increased health focus of the government of Malawi. From 2002 to 2011, the percentage of total government expenditures allocated to health increased from 13% to 18.5%.

Malawi's increased government expenditure on healthcare in around 2010 coincided with a decrease in the country's dependence on external healthcare, such as international and non-governmental aid. In 2009 external resources were responsible for 97.4% of total health expenditures, in 2011 they were responsible for 52.4%. In 2017 89% of Malawian healthcare was provided through donors.

Sources of health care spending over time (2019 USD)
Year	Prepaid Private Spending	Out-of-Pocket Spending	Government Spending	Development Assistance for Health	Total
1995	1	3	4	5	13
2005	1	2	4	12	19
2015	2	4	10	25	41
2025	3	5	11	26	45
2035	4	6	15	25	50
2045	5	7	19	26	57

== Health staffing ==
In Malawi's health profile, last updated in May 2013, the World Health Organization reported that there were only 0.2 physicians per 10,000 population and 3.4 nurses and midwives per 10,000 population. Malawi's shortage of healthcare personnel is the most severe in the region. Additionally, the minimal body of health workers are not evenly distributed in the healthcare system. Challenges that lead to this shortage are low outputs of medical training institutions, health worker retention, and disease.

In the 1990s, Malawi stopped training auxiliary nurses and medical assistants. In 2001, this training was resumed in an effort to increase human resources for health care.

In 2005, Malawi began to implement its emergency human resource program which concentrates on increasing output of trained medical personnel, improving health worker compensation and retention.

In 2017, there were around 200 pharmacists in the country, of which fewer than 10 are in the country's hospitals. Most hospitals don't have a pharmacist, and they use up their annual drug allocation in six months.

Staff at Nkhoma Mission Hospital

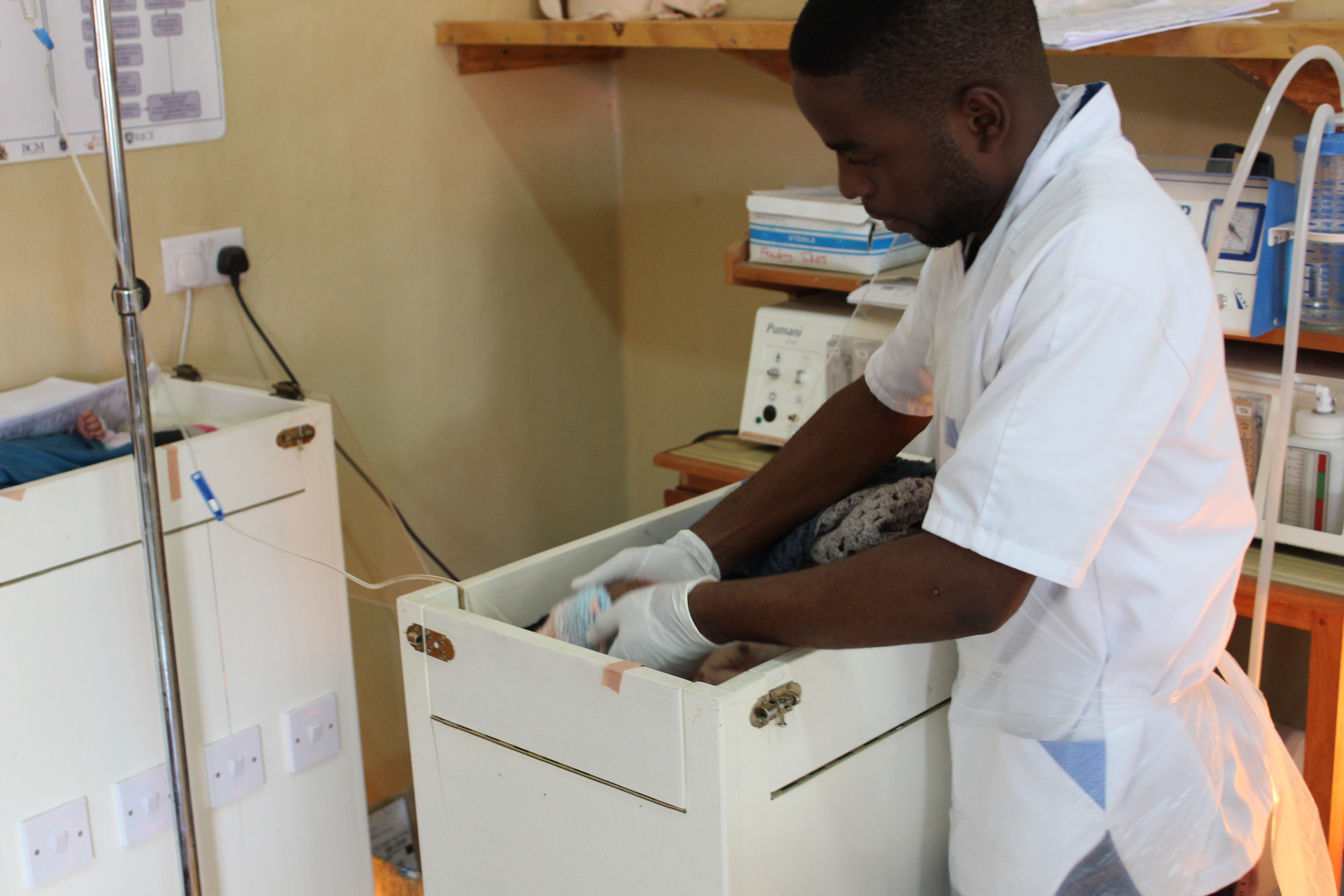
Nurse with neonate.

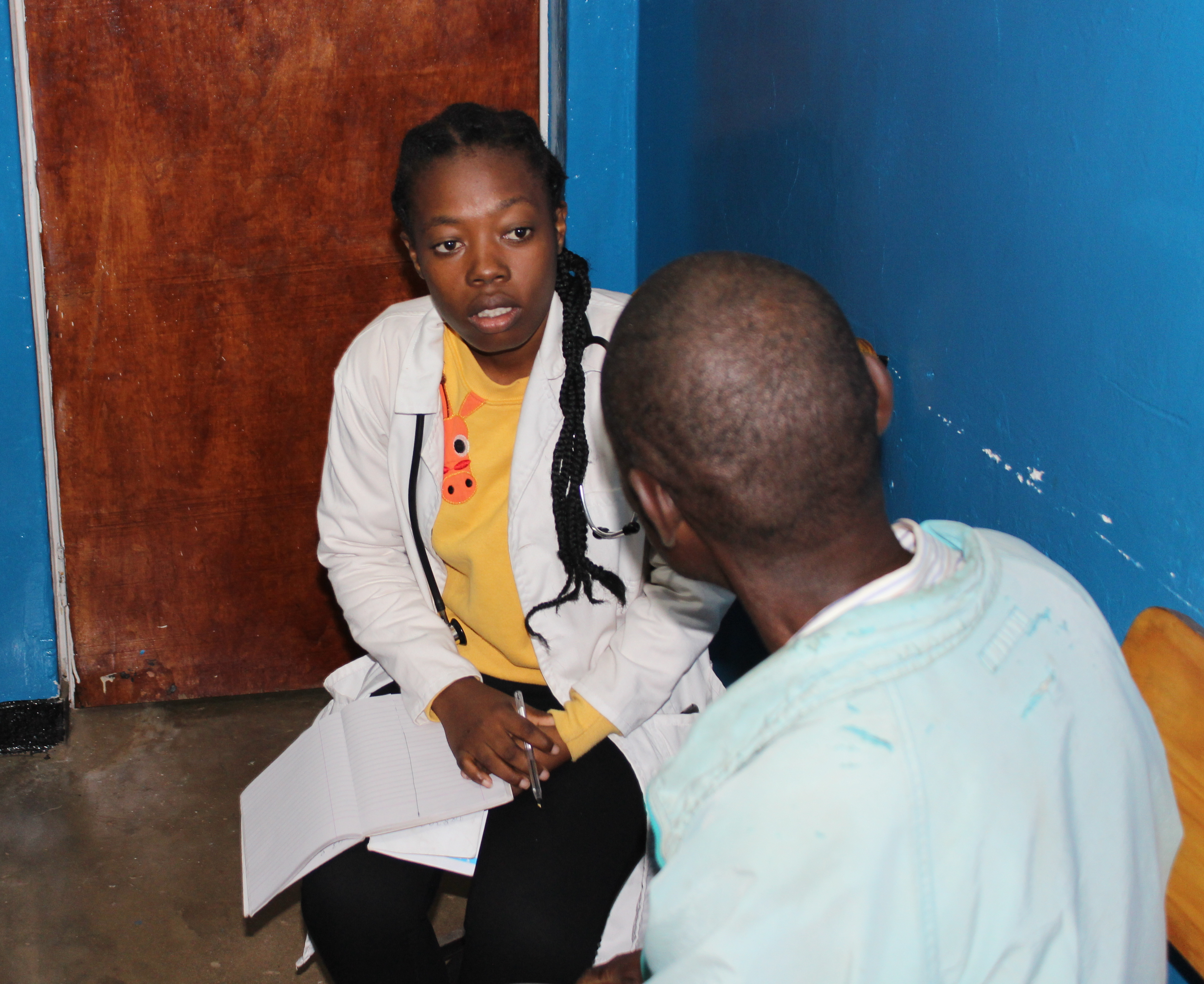
A clinic visit.

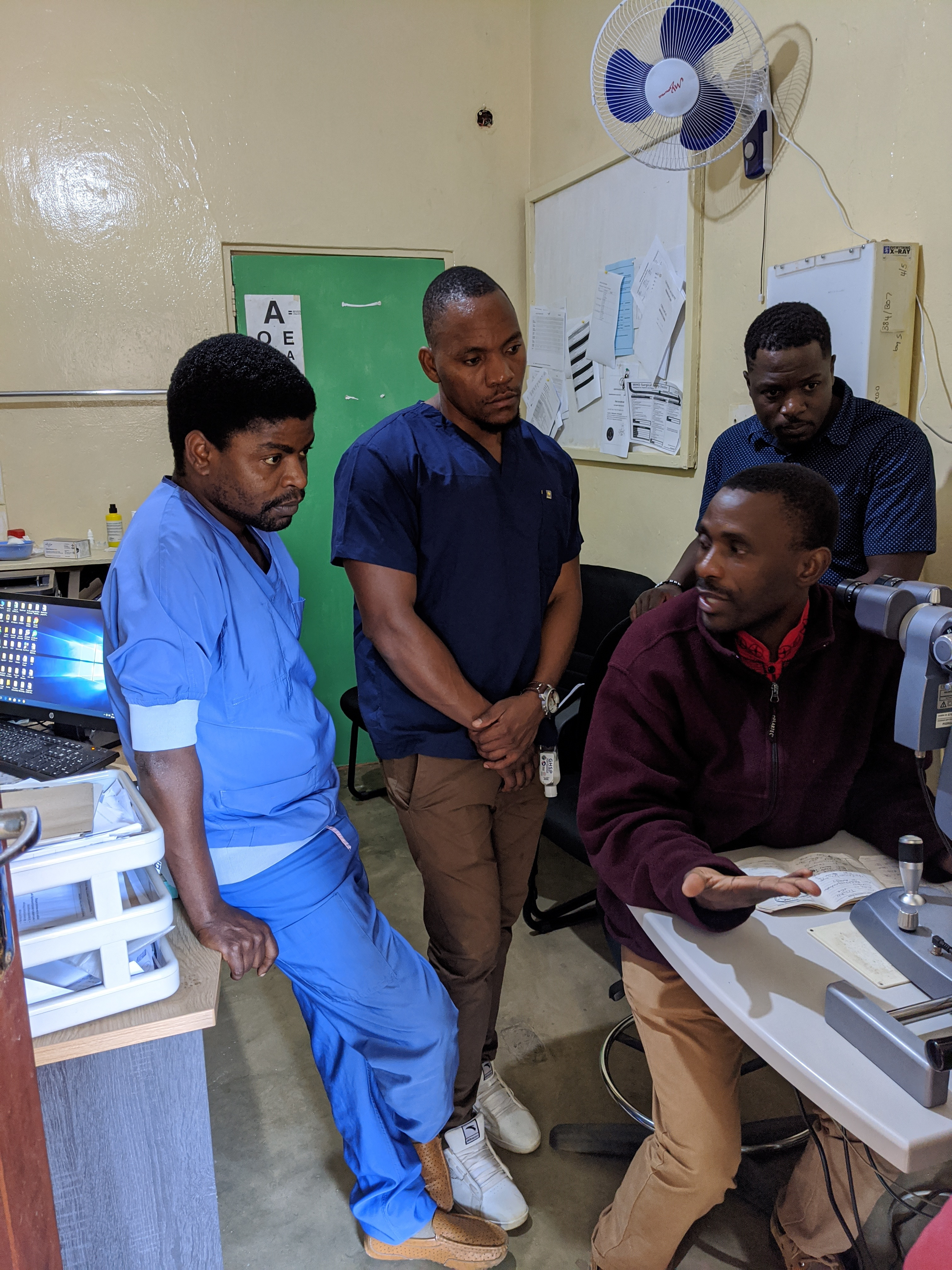
Ophthalmology rotation.

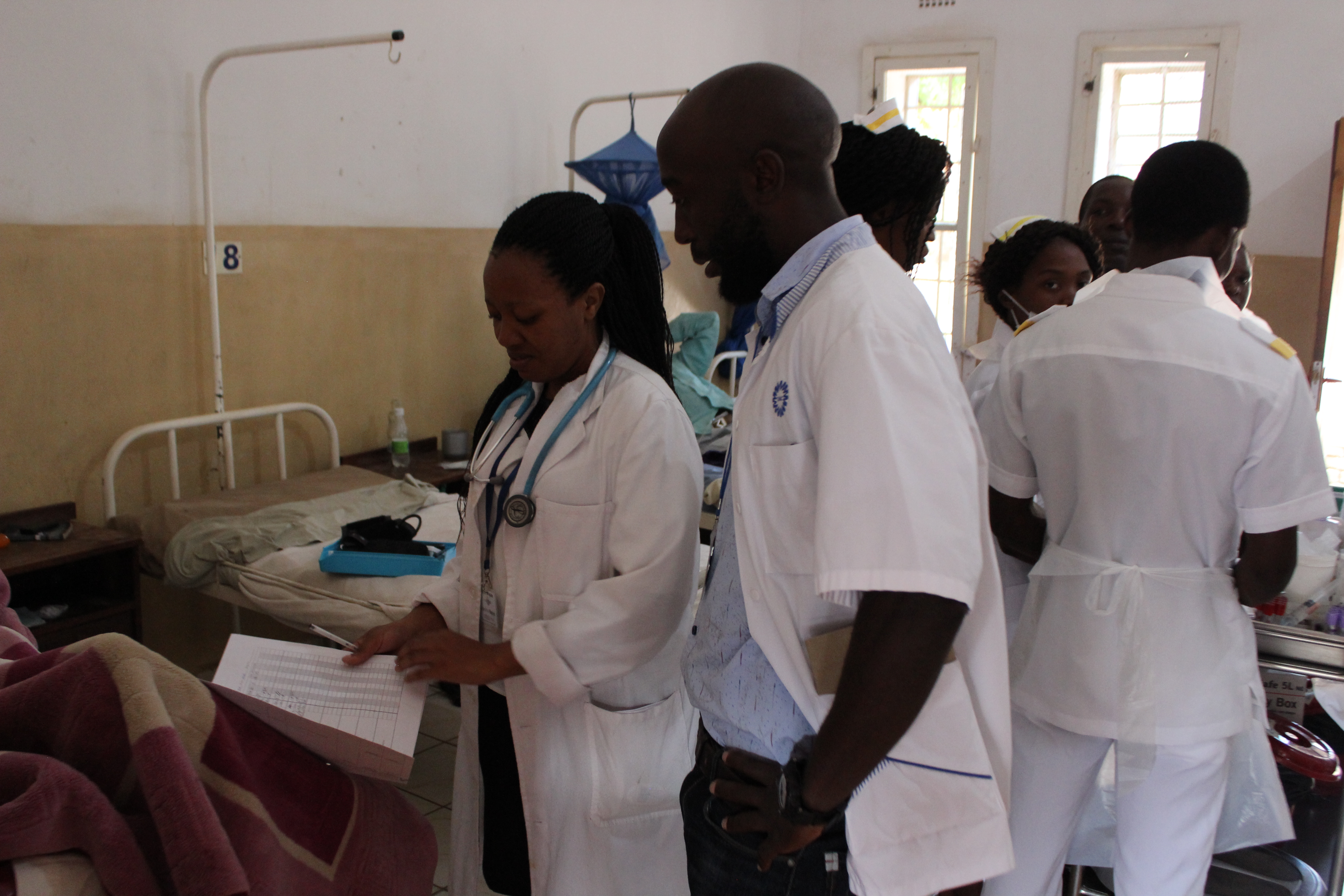
Discussion of a patient.

== Access to healthcare facilities ==
Limited access to health services in Malawi affect a large number of Malawians. Only 46% of citizens live within a 5-km radius of any kind of health facility. Despite most public health services being free for the patients, there are often costs associated with transportation to and from a facility. These costs deter many individuals that may be in dire need of care but cannot afford to assume the costs of transportation. Additional transportation needs complicate matters when an individual is referred from either a rural hospital to a district hospital or a district hospital to a central hospital. Medobal in 2019 launched programs which gives direct access to healthcare specialists in overseas.

== Government efforts for healthcare improvement ==
The Ministry of Health explicitly states the goals of healthcare improvement efforts in Malawi.

1. Range and quality of health services for mothers children under the age of 5 years expanded
2. Better quality health care provided in all facilities
3. Health services to general population strengthened expanded and integrated
4. Efficiency and equity in resource allocation increased
5. Access to health care facilities and basic services increased
6. Quality of trained human resources increased, improved equitably/efficiently distributed
7. Collaboration and partnership in health sector strengthened
8. Overall resources in health sector increased

These objectives have been addressed in a variety of ways. In 2002, Malawi published the Poverty Reduction Strategy which included the Essential Health Package (EHP). The EHP was derived from estimates of the most significant burdens of disease in Malawi provided in 2002 by the World Health Organization. Its central focus is to combat 11 health issues that most greatly affect the poor.

In 2004, the government of Malawi, in collaboration with partners, developed a six-year program of work (POW) that revolved around the EHP and guided the implementation of a health sector-wide approach (SWAp). In 2007, POW transitioned to become the Health Sector Strategic Plan, effective from 2007 to 2011.

Measuring the outcomes of interventions, such as those facilitated by the SWAp, is very difficult due to the absence of a vital registration system and surveys to track changes in mortality.

== Reception of global health initiative funds ==
The shortage of health workers in Malawi is an obstacle to utilizing Global Health Initiatives (GHI) funds effectively. Increasing health services such as HIV/AIDs treatment commonly prompt an increase in the number of minimally trained health care workers and a modest increase in clinical staff members. According to an extensive study published in 2010, when Malawi received a large amount of GHI funding from the Global Fund to fight AIDS, tuberculosis, and malaria, there was an increase in faculty and staff across all levels of the health system. This increase in paid health workers was supported by task-shifting to less trained staff.
