= Kamuzu Central Hospital =

Malawian public referral hospital

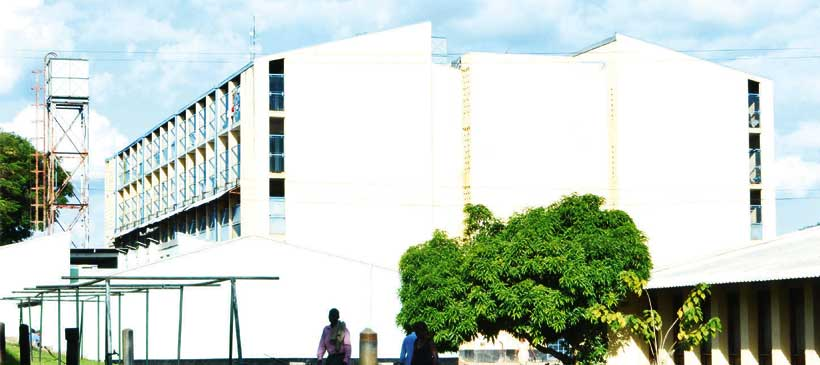

- Location of Lilongwe

Geography
- Location: Lilongwe, Malawi
- Coordinates: 13°58′37″S 33°47′11″E

Organisation
- Care system: Public
- Type: District General, Teaching
- Affiliated university: University of North Carolina

Services
- Emergency department: Yes
- Beds: 780

Helipads
- Helipad: No

History
- Founded: 1977; 49 years ago

Links
- Other links: List of hospitals in Malawi

Kamuzu Central Hospital is a tertiary referral hospital in the city of Lilongwe, the capital of Malawi. It is estimated to have 780 beds, and a larger number of patients. It serves approximately 5 million people, referred from five district hospitals and from other parts of Malawi and parts of neighboring Tanzania, Zambia, Mozambique and Zimbabwe.

== Location ==
The hospital is located in an area of the city of Lilongwe called Area 33 (also Nangwagwa), south of the Lingazi Namilomba Forest Reserve and the Lilongwe Wildlife Centre; adjacent to Kamuzu College of Nursing. The geographical coordinates of the hospital are:13°58'37.0"S, 33°47'11.0"E (Latitude:-13.976944; Longitude:33.786389).

== Overview ==
Kamuzu Central Hospital is a large referral hospital that serves as the referral hospital for the Central Region of Malawi. It is the referral hospital for about 5 million people. As of May 2020, it had about 60 doctors and about 300 nurses. As of 2019, the hospital admitted as many as 25,000 children annually. That is an average of about 70 children daily.

In April 2012, the late Bingu wa Mutharika (24 February 1934 – 5 April 2012), the third President of Malawi was admitted to Kamuzu Central Hospital and was diagnosed with cardiac arrest.

== History ==
The hospital was built in 1977 by the Danish International Development Agency (DANIDA), with money provided by the government of Denmark. Political problems cropped up before the hospital was complete. Only the first phase was finished.

The departments that were left out included (a) Obstetrics & Gynecology including Antenatal care (b) Orthopedics (c) Psychiatry and (d) Tuberculosis unit.

From 1977 until 2004, the hospital was known as Lilongwe Central Hospital. In 2004, it rebranded to its current name.

== Collaboration and partnerships ==
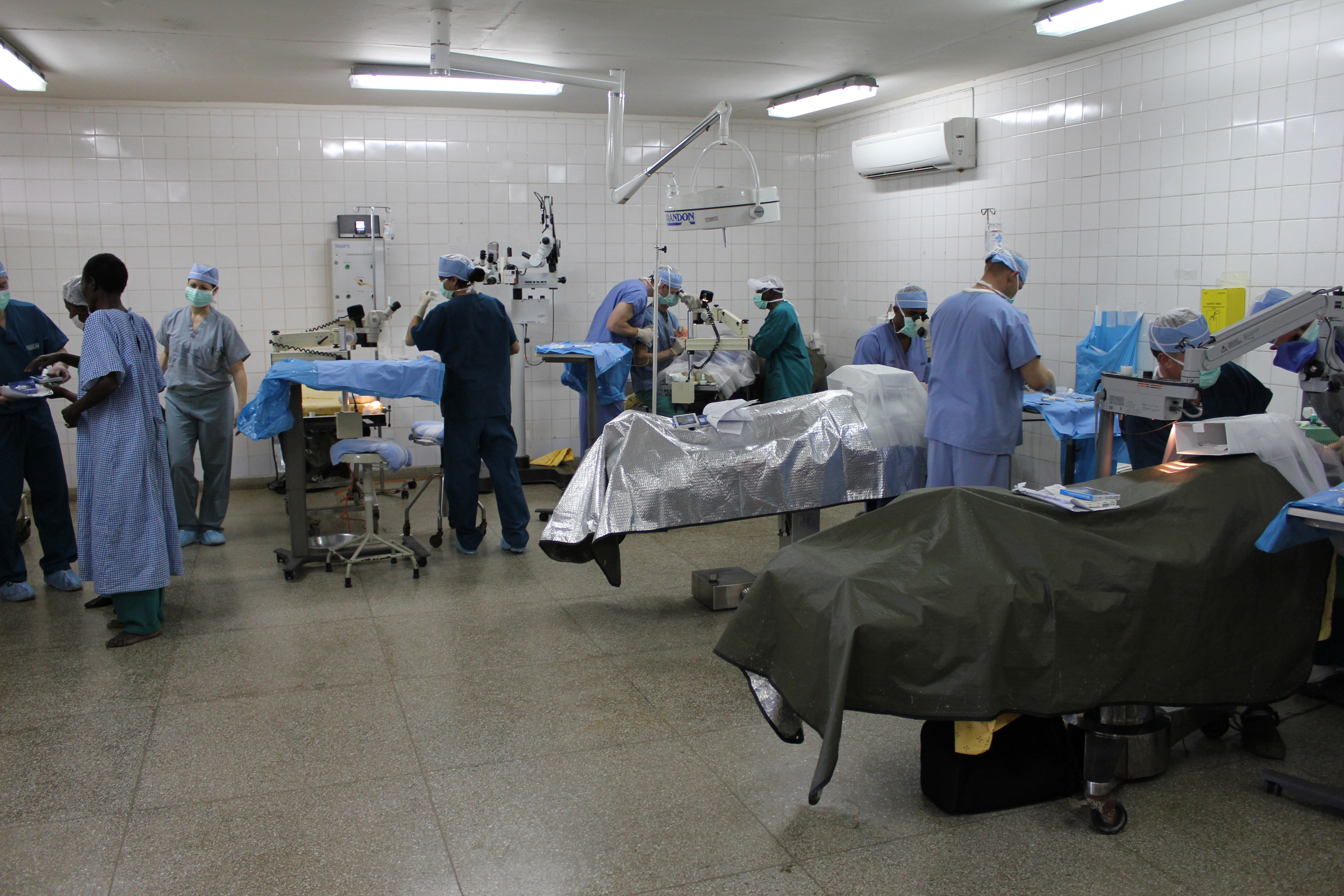
US Army surgeons conduct cataract surgery in 2011

Kamuzu Central Hospital has a partnership with the University of North Carolina. The objective of the collaboration is to "identify innovative, culturally acceptable, and affordable methods to improve the health of the people of Malawi, through research, capacity building, and care".

The hospital received support from Baylor Pediatric AIDS Initiative (BIPAI). Additional support came from the German Hospital Partnership MAGNET, administered through the German Corporation for International Cooperation GmbH (GIZ). Funding continued until 2015, having started in 2008.

Olivia Giles's charity 500 Miles began a partnership in 2009 that began with two staff working in shipping containers to provide a prosthetic and orthopaedic service at the hospital. After sixteen years the service became part of the Lilongwe Institute of Orthopaedics and Neurosurgery in 2024 when it was given to the Ministry of Health with a promise of continued support.

Kamuzu Central Hospital partners with SIGN Fracture Care International to make orthopaedic care more accessible for the people in the region.

== See also ==
- List of hospitals in Malawi
