= List of Chewas =

This is a list of notable Chewa people, a Bantu people of central and southern Africa.

== Athletes ==
- Allan Chibwe
- Billy Mutale
- Ernest Mbewe
- Gamphani Lungu
- Patson Daka
- Chimango Kayira
- Christopher Katongo
- Felix Katongo
- Jacob Mulenga
- Kieran Ngwenya
- Davies Phiri
- Prince Mumba
- Webster Muzaza
- Kåre Becker

== Politicians ==
- Hastings Kamuzu Banda
- Rupiah Bwezani Banda
- Joyce Banda
- Lazarus Chakwera
- Justin Malewezi
- John Tembo
- Felix Mlusu
- Aaron Gadama

== Others ==
- Isabel Apawo Phiri
- Jessie Kabwila-Kapasula
