= Tembo =

Tembo may refer to:

== People ==
- Andrew Tembo (born 1971), Zambian football midfielder
- Asafu Tembo, Zambian judoka
- Biggie Tembo, Zimbabwean musician and vocalist for The Bhundu Boys
- Biggie Tembo Jr. (born 1988), Zimbabwean musician
- Bruce Tembo (born 1991), Zimbabwean cricketer
- Chris Tembo, Zambian football coach
- Christon Tembo (1944–2009), Zambian politician and army commander
- Dorothy Tembo (born 1961), is Zambian economist and trade and development expert
- Eddie Tembo (born 1980), Zambian-born Scottish shinty player
- Fwayo Tembo (born 1989), Zambian footballer
- John Tembo (1932-2023), Malawian politician
- John Tembo Jr, Malawian diplomat
- Kaitano Tembo (born 1970), Zimbabwean football defender
- Kenias Tembo (born 1955), Zimbabwean long-distance runner
- Lazarus Tembo, Zambian singer
- Lily Tembo (1981–2009), Zambian musician, radio presenter, journalist and charity worker
- Martha Tembo (born 1998), Zambian footballer
- Nancy Tembo, Malawian politician
- Paul Tembo (died 6 July 2001), Zambian politician
- Stanley Tembo, Zambian footballer
- Vera Tembo (born 1953), Zambian politician
- Ziyo Tembo (born 1985), Zambian footballer

== Places ==
- Bahia de Tembo, a beach in Oaxaca, Mexico
- Tembo-Aluma, a town in Malanje, Angola

== Other ==
- Tembo (film), 1951 American documentary film
- A Bantu ethnic group in the Democratic Republic of the Congo
- Tembo, a palm wine in Tanzania and other countries (or sometimes just alcohol)
- Tembo language (disambiguation)
- Tembo the Badass Elephant, a 2015 video game
- Tembo (beer), a beer of the Democratic Republic of the Congo

== See also ==
- Tempo
