= Ministry of Finance (Malawi) =

Malawian ministry of state finance

Agency overview
- Formed: 1963; 63 years ago
- Type: Executive Department
- Jurisdiction: Government of Malawi
- Headquarters: Lilongwe
- Minister responsible: Sosten Gwengwe, Finance Minister of Malawi
- Agency executive: Permanent Secretary
- Parent department: Government of Malawi
- Key document: Constitution of Malawi

The Malawian Ministry of Finance (Chichewa: Unduna wa Chuma), (Chitumbuka: Unduna wavya Chuma) is a Malawian ministry. The ministry is responsible for state finance, including taxation, the state budget, regulation and economic policy in Malawi.

The current minister of finance is Sosten Gwengwe (Malawi Congress Party). The department reports to the Parliament of Malawi.

== History ==
The ministry of finance was established in 1963 during the colonial period of Malawi. The first Minister of Finance was Henry Phillips from 1963 to 1964.

== Organization ==
The ministry is divided into the following sections:

- Financial Markets Department
- Tax Law Department
- Political staff
- Information Unit
- Asset Management Department
- Budget Department
- Tax Policy Department
- Economic Policy Department
- Department of Administrative Affairs

=== Subsidiaries ===
The following government agencies are subordinate to the ministry:

- The Government Pension Fund of Malawi
- National Insurance Scheme Fund
- Bank of Malawi
- Malawian Customs and Excise Authorities
- Malawian Financial Supervisory Authority
- Malawian Government Agency for Financial Management
- Malawian National Collection Agency
- Malawian Tax Administration
- Statistics Malawi

== See also ==
- List of Malawian Ministers of Finance
