= Goodall Gondwe =

Malawian economist (1936–2023)

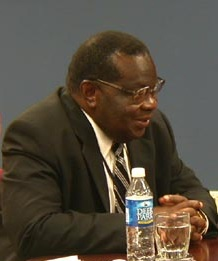

Minister of Finance, Economic Planning and Development
- In office 6 June 2014 – 15 May 2019
- President: Peter Mutharika
- Preceded by: Maxwell Mkwezalamba
- Succeeded by: Joseph Mwanamvekha

Minister of Natural Resources, Energy and Environment Affairs
- In office August 2011 – 26 April 2012
- President: Bingu wa Mutharika

Minister of Local Government and Rural Development
- In office June 2009 – August 2010
- President: Bingu wa Mutharika

Minister of Finance
- In office 2004 – June 2009
- President: Bingu wa Mutharika
- Preceded by: Friday Jumbe
- Succeeded by: Ken Kandodo

Personal details
- Born: 1 December 1936 Mzimba, Nyasaland (now Malawi)
- Died: 8 August 2023 (aged 86) Lilongwe, Malawi
- Party: Democratic Progressive Party
- Education: University of London (BSc)
- Profession: Economist

Goodall Edward Gondwe (1 December 1936 – 8 August 2023) was a Malawian economist who served in his country's cabinet as Minister of Finance on two occasions: from 2004 to 2009, and from 2014 to 2019. He also served as Minister of Local Government from 2009 to 2010 and Minister of Natural Resources, Energy and Environment Affairs from 2011 to 2012.

Gondwe was director of the Africa Division of the International Monetary Fund before returning to Malawi to work as a politician. In the period leading up to his election as Member of Parliament, he served as the Chief Economic Advisor to President Bakili Muluzi.

== Early life and education ==
Gondwe was born on 1 December 1936, and was from Kayiwonanga village, Mzimba, in the Northern Region of Malawi. He lived and worked in Ivory Coast and in Virginia in the United States. He received his undergraduate training from the University of London, graduating with a B.Sc. in economics. Upon graduation, he received a number of appointments to national and international financial institutions, including: General Manager of the Reserve Bank of Malawi; Senior Vice President and Acting President of the African Development Bank; Senior Advisor, Director for Africa and Special Advisor to the managing director of the International Monetary Fund; and Chief Economic Advisor to President Bakili Muluzi.

== Political career ==
Gondwe began his political career serving as an economic adviser to Bakili Muluzi and subsequently Bingu wa Mutharika. He did not want to go deep in politics but was forced to do so after the conviction and sentencing to jail of the incumbent MP of Mzimba North. He rose up in the ranks in both Malawi's cabinet and the Democratic Progressive Party.

=== Finance Minister of Malawi ===
Gondwe was appointed to the position of Minister of Finance in June 2004 by President Bingu wa Mutharika. He had been credited with Malawi's success during Mutharika's first term. His economic development policies, together with Mutharika, helped drastically improve the economic situation in the country. Under his stewardship the rate of inflation fell from 30% in 2005 to 6% by 2008. More importantly Malawi saw its economy grow by approximately 6 percent. Malawi is a relatively small economy due to its low natural resources compared to its neighbours like Zambia, Tanzania and Zimbabwe. In 2008, Gondwe was voted as Africa's Finance Minister of the Year at the African Banker Awards, held at the Willard Intercontinental Hotel in Washington DC, USA. The Nyasa Times of Malawi calls him the “Engine room for Malawi economic achievements."”

==== Paladin Energy ====
Gondwe played a primary role in negotiating the contract and agreement with the Australian uranium mining company Paladin Energy, which was Malawi's first uranium mining company. Gondwe noted that the exploration of uranium would boost the country's export base. The revenue for the uranium was projected to exceed proceeds from tobacco, Malawi's main foreign exchange earner. During this time, the Minister of Energy and Mining was Henry Chimunthu Banda. The uranium project also promised to transform the under-developed Kayelekera which is in the underdeveloped northern region by turning it into a prosperous town. It was expected to create jobs for 800 people during the construction and 280 people during the operation. The project and Paladin Energy, however, has received some criticism for labor, health and environmental risks by the public.

=== Minister of Local Government ===
Following the May 2009 general election, Mutharika reshuffled his cabinet and Gondwe's portfolio, moving him from Minister of Finance to Minister of Local Government. He was replaced as Minister of Finance by Ken Kandodo, nephew of former President Hastings Banda, who was later replaced after nationwide strikes against economic mismanagement and the unveiling of his Zero Deficit Budget.

=== Later career ===
On 1 August 2011 he was appointed vice-president of the Democratic Progressive Party (DPP) by the party's National Governing Council. Shortly after this he was appointed Minister of Natural Resources.

In October 2012, Gondwe announced he would be resigning from the DPP and retiring from politics altogether at the 2014 general elections. However, Gondwe was again appointed Minister of Finance by President Peter Mutharika in June 2014.

== Death ==
Goodall Gondwe died in Lilongwe on 8 August 2023, at the age of 86.

== Awards ==
- Africa's "Finance Minister of the Year", African Banker Awards – 2008
