= Ken Kandodo =

Malawian politician

Ken Kandodo MP

Minister of Finance
- In office 15 June 2009 – 8 September 2011
- President: Bingu wa Mutharika
- Preceded by: Goodall Gondwe
- Succeeded by: Ken Lipenga

Member of Parliament Kasungu Central
- Incumbent
- Assumed office 19 May 2009

Personal details
- Party: Democratic Progressive Party
- Relations: Hastings Banda
- Education: University of Malawi, University of Strathclyde
- Occupation: Politician (MP, Cabinet minister)
- Profession: Accountant

Ken Kandodo is a Financial Manager, MP and politician who was appointed Malawi's Minister of Labour in July 2020, following the 2020 presidential elections. Ken Kandodo was relieved from his ministerial position in April 2021 following the fraudulent use of COVID-19 funds. Ken Kandodo also served as Malawi's Minister of Finance from 15 June 2009 to 8 September 2011, due to the reshuffle in the Cabinet of Malawi. Kandodo is a grand nephew of former president Hastings Banda.On 18 April 2021, Ken Kandodo was fired from his ministerial post due to mismanagement of COVID-19 funds. He is a Chewa from the midlands of Malawi.

== Early life and career ==
He attended the University of Malawi, graduating in 1983 with a BSc in Social Science, majoring in economics. He attended the University of Strathclyde in Scotland, where he obtained an MBA degree in Finance. He worked as an Auditor with KPMG for ten years in the United Kingdom, Malawi and Mozambique. He was appointed a lead Consultant for UNICEF, holding this position for six years. He was UNICEF's Lead Consultant in a project in Mozambique to develop financial systems for managing the HIV/AIDS Common Fund. Before being elected to parliament, Kandodo was Chairperson of the Lilongwe Water Board and the National Food Reserve Agency.

== Political career ==
Kandodo became a senior member of the Malawi Congress Party. In 2006 he joined the Democratic Progressive Party. Kandodo was elected Member of Parliament for Kasungu Central in May 2009. He was appointed Minister of Finance on 15 June 2009, replacing Goodall Gondwe. Ken Kandodo introduced the unpopular Zero Deficit Budget in Malawi in 2011 under the Bingu wa Mutharika administration. This was an unpopular bill during a time of economic crisis in Malawi that lead to unprecedented levels of fuel shortage, forex exchange and general economic mismanagement. This led to the nationwide economic based July, 20th 2011 Malawi protests. Kandodo was replaced after 2 months after the protests by Ken Lipenga as part of the Cabinet reshuffle that occurred on 8 September 2011.

== Philanthropy ==
He is sponsor of the Ken Kandodo Trophy, which presents awards to soccer and netball teams in and around Kasungu.

== Personal ==
In 1991, he married Monica Kandodo (née Chavula) a chartered quantity surveyor and have two daughters together.

His cousin, Jane Dzanjalimodzi, was appointed First Secretary to the Malawi Mission in Egypt in November 2010.

He reported having contracted COVID-19 on 22 December 2020. He later recovered.
