= Rodwell Munyenyembe =

Malawian politician

Speaker of the National Assembly of Malawi
- In office June 1994 – June 1999
- Preceded by: Brian Mtawali
- Succeeded by: Sam Mpasu
- In office June 2004 – June 2005
- Preceded by: Davis Katsonga
- Succeeded by: Louis Chimango

Personal details
- Born: 1 January 1936 Nthalire, Chitipa District, Nyasaland
- Died: 27 June 2005 (aged 69) Johannesburg, South Africa
- Party: MCP (1970s); AFORD (1994–1999); UDF (from 1999)

Rodwell Thomas Changara Munyenyembe (1 January 1936 – 27 June 2005) was a Malawian politician who served twice as Speaker of the National Assembly, from 1994 to 1999 and again from 2004 until his death. He also twice served as a cabinet minister, in the governments of Hastings Banda and Bakili Muluzi. He worked as a teacher prior to entering politics.

== Early life ==
Munyenyembe was born in Nthalire, a village in the Chitipa District of the Northern Region. He studied at a teachers' college in Domasi, and received his qualification in 1960, subsequently working as a primary school teacher. Munyenyembe later undertook further training in England in order to become a teacher of the deaf, receiving a certificate in deaf education from Manchester Metropolitan University in 1966 and a certificate in audiometry from the University of London in 1967.

== Politics ==
Munyenyembe was elected to the National Assembly in 1971, representing the Malawi Congress Party (MCP). He entered cabinet just a few years later, becoming Minister for Information and Broadcasting in the government of Hastings Banda. In August 1973, his previous title was abolished and he was instead made Minister for Community Development and Social Welfare. In February 1974, Munyenyembe also replaced John Msonthi as Minister for Education, taking charge of two ministries for a few weeks until his earlier portfolio was transferred to Dominic Kainja Nthara. Within his party, he became a member of the MCP's national executive committee in May 1974, and was also made deputy chairman of the party for the Northern Region. However, he had a falling out with Hastings Banda a few years later, and in July 1977 was removed both from cabinet and from the MCP committee. Once his first stint in politics was over, Munyenyembe moved to Rumphi and took up tobacco farming. He eventually became chairman of the Tobacco Association of Malawi.

At the 1994 general election, Munyenyembe re-entered the National Assembly as a candidate of the Alliance for Democracy (AFORD), standing in the Chitipa South constituency. The election resulted in a hung parliament, with the United Democratic Front (UDF) winning the majority of seats and AFORD holding the balance of power. In negotiations to form a new government, it was agreed that Munyenyembe would take on the speakership. He held the position until his defeat at the 1999 election, where he stood as a UDF-backed independent. Despite losing his seat in the National Assembly, Munyenyembe remained involved in politics, with President Bakili Muluzi appointed him to the position of Minister of State for Presidential Affairs. He was made Minister for Defence a few months later. At the 2004 general election, at which Muluzi left office, Munyenyembe was re-elected to parliament, standing for the UDF in Chitipa North. He was subsequently also re-elected to the speakership.

== Death ==
In June 2005, Munyenyembe had a severe stroke in the speaker's chair while officiating on a motion to impeach President Bingu wa Mutharika. He was carried out of the chamber unconscious, and subsequently flown to South Africa to receive medical treatment. He died at Milpark Hospital, Johannesburg, a few days later, from a heart attack.
