= List of speakers of the National Assembly of Malawi =

The Speaker is the presiding officer of the National Assembly of Malawi.

== List of speakers ==
Legislative Council
Name	Took office	Left office	Notes
Henry Wilcox Wilson	1958	1961	
W. Wenban-Smith	1961	1963	
Alec Mjuma Nyasulu	13 August 1963	1964	
Legislative Assembly
Alec Mjuma Nyasulu	1964	6 July 1964	
National Assembly
Alec Mjuma Nyasulu	6 July 1964	1964	
Ismail K. Surtee	27 October 1964	1971	
Alec Mjuma Nyasulu	1971	February 1975	
Nelson P.W. Khonje	11 February 1975	March 1987	
Mordecai Lungu	June 1987	November 1992	
Brain Mtawali	20 November 1992	May 1994	
Rodwell Munyenyembe	30 June 1994	June 1999	
Sam Mpasu	13 July 1999	May 2003	
Davis Katsonga	May 2003	2004	
Rodwell Munyenyembe	June 2004	June 2005	
Louis Chimango	June 2005	June 2009	
Henry Chimunthu Banda	June 2009	May 2014	
Richard Msowoya	June 2014	May 2019	
Catherine Gotani Hara	19 June 2019	5 August 2025	
Sameer Suleman	29 October 2025	Incumbent	

== List of Deputy Speakers ==
Name	Took office	Left office	Notes
National Assembly
Esther Mcheka Chilenje	2014	2019	
Madalitso Kazombo	19 June 2019	5 August 2025	
Victor Musowa	29 October 2025	Incumbent	

== List of Second Deputy Speakers ==
Name	Took office	Left office	Notes
National Assembly
Aisha Adams	19 June 2019	5 August 2025	
Esther Jolobala	29 October 2025	Incumbent	
