= 2011 Malawian protests =

2011 Malawi protests
- Date: 17 July 2011 – 21 September 2011
- Location: Malawi
- Caused by: Corruption, inflation, fuel shortages
- Goals: Resignation of President Bingu wa Mutharika and his government
- Methods: Demonstrations
- Status: Ended

Parties
| Government of Malawi; Democratic Progressive Party; Concerned Citizens | Human Rights Consultative Committee (coalition) |

Lead figures
| Bingu wa Mutharika | MacDonald Sembereka; Undule Mwakasungula; Rafiq Hajat |

Casualties and losses
| | 19 killed, at least 58 injured (Human Rights Commission claim) and 98 seriously injured on both sides with up to 275 arrests made. |

The 2011 Malawi protests were protests aimed at winning political and economic reforms or concessions from the government of Malawi. On 20 July, Malawian organisations protested against perceived poor economic management and poor governance by President Bingu wa Mutharika and his Democratic Progressive Party. After the first two days of protests, 18 deaths, 98 serious injuries and 275 arrests had been reported. Further demonstrations were organised on 17 August and 21 September The first protest was later cancelled due to the intervention of a UN representative in initiating a dialogue; however, the talks broke down with more protests planned for Red Wednesday through a national vigil.

== Causes ==
The protesters' grievances were highlighted in a 15-page petition presented by a group of civil society NGOs which included a list of 20 demands:

- Acute and growing fuel shortages – queuing for fuel was becoming progressively worse over the past two years.
- Forex shortfalls
- Electricity shortages
- Introduction of the "Zero Deficit Budget of Malawi" – this budget was introduced after England withdrew budgetary support from Malawi.
- Firing of four university lecturers, including Jessie Kabwila-Kapasula, Blessings Chinsinga, Garton Kamchedzera and Edge Kanyongolo and limiting academic freedom at the University of Malawi.
- Attempts against controlling public protests through the requirement of a fee-to-protest of K2 million for mass demonstrations.
- Relations with the United Kingdom following the expulsion of the High Commissioner to Malawi as a result of the Chochraine-Dyet controversy by The Nation.
- Press freedom, particularly for the Malawi Broadcasting Corporation.
- Failure to monitor proceeds of the Australian company Paladin Energy
- Expansion of the cabinet
- Payments to First Lady Callista Mutharika
- Nepotism and the succession of wa Mutharika's brother Peter Mutharika as the head of state.
- "Injunctions Bill," which prevents obtaining injunctions against the government despite a court rejection of the bill.
- Reversal of the unpopular change to the Flag of Malawi
- "Sheer arrogance" of wa Mutharika
- Unconstitutional treatment of elected officials, notably attempts to strip Vice President Joyce Banda of rights and privileges accorded by the Constitution of Malawi

== Protests ==
After several weeks of protests, on 19 July, the government issued an order banning civil society organisations from protesting. A day before the protest, the government set out to intimidate potential protestors. Two vehicles belonging to the independent private radio station Zodiak Radio were set alight by masked men. In the commercial capital Blantyre, five official DPP vehicles carrying DPP Youth Cadets (a youth wing of the DPP) were seen driving around the city waving machetes. The government obtained an injunction to stop the protests.

=== 20 July ===
A coalition of 80 Civil societies and NGOs, religious and student groups (collectively known as 'Concerned Citizens') chose 20 July 2011 as a day of national protest against economic and administrative management. Prominent civil and human rights organisations like the umbrella NGO Human Rights Consultative Committee (HRCC) and the Centre for Human Rights and Rehabilitation (CHRR) were both a part of the Concerned Citizens group and played a central role in planning the protest. It also included the Malawi Law Society and the Council of Churches. Mutharika then scheduled a public lecture for the same day to which he invited all citizens, NGO's and civil societies upon registration. The Concerned Citizens largely said that they would not attend a 'lecture' by the president because they wanted dialogue and their concerns to be addressed. Pro-government supporters then scheduled a pro-government protest on the same day, 20 July. On the morning of 20 July 2011, mass anti-government protests began in the major cities of Mzuzu, Blantyre, and the capital Lilongwe. Protests also occurred in Zomba, Kasungu, and Ntchesi. The Concerned Citizens were wearing red shirts and other articles of clothing and called themselves the "Red Army for Democracy and Peace." The protests began peacefully with participants singing the national anthem, taking photos, holding signs and giving speeches. A number of protesters were waving the old Malawi flag the public display of which had been banned by the Mutharika government.

The government response to these protests included preemptive arrests of civil society leaders. Police assaulted MCP spokesperson Nancy Tembo, Joyce Banda's sister Anjimile Oponyo, The Nation journalist Kondwani Munthali and the head of the HRCC Undule Mwakasungula. There was a clamp down by police on anyone wearing red clothes which was particularly violent in Mzuzu. Police forces began to disrupt broadcasts by radio stations, and ordered journalists not to report on the protests. Anti-government citizens clashed with security forces in the northern cities of Mzuzu and Karonga and Blantyre.

After the national lecture by President Mutharika, which failed to address the grievances of the protesters, tensions grew further and looting of targeted business and properties began. Business properties of political allies of the president were targeted, along with the homes of two police officers in the north that had participated in the clampdown of protesters with excessive force. The violence continued to grow largely in the major cities.

=== 21 July ===
Although the protests were only planned for 20 July, they continued the next day because of the manner in which the government responded to the protests. The government did not acknowledge that there was discontent in the country and clamped down on journalists, radio stations, citizens and protesters wearing red. On 21 July the army was sent in to reinforce riot police already present in Mzuzu, Blantyre, Ntchesi, and in the capital Lilongwe. At least two people were killed amid widespread looting in the suburbs of Lilongwe as Mutharika vowed to "use any measure I can think of" to quell the unrest.

=== 22 July ===
The director of the Church and Society rights organisation, Moses Mkandawire, said that the government had blocked funeral processions for seven of those killed in the previous two days' protests. "We have been stopped by the government with our arrangements to bury the seven heroes. The government says it will provide transport to have the seven buried in their respective [village] homes." Al Jazeera reported that a number of these protest leaders had received death threats and gone into hiding for fear of arrest or worse.

=== 23 July ===
Vice President Joyce Banda, one of the opposition leaders Mutharika accused of inciting unrest, publicly endorsed the protests against Mutharika's government and stated "regret" for deaths, injuries, and property damage incurred during the demonstrations. Banda, thought to be entertaining a run for the presidency in 2014, suggested poor economic conditions, corruption, and weak democratic institutions had forced Malawians to take to the streets. She said she had appealed to Mutharika to hold a dialogue with the United Kingdom, the former colonial power of Malawi with which the Mutharika administration had recently become embroiled in a diplomatic row, over the Cochrane-Dyet cable in the hopes of forging an agreement to provide Malawi with economic relief.

=== 26 July ===
Rafiq Hajat, the director of the Institute for Policy Interaction warned Mutharika that if he did not address protesters' demands by 16 August, demonstrations would resume on 17 August with the goal of ending his regime. The Public Affairs Committee, a group composed of both Christian and Muslim activists, also warned that "should [the] government continue to harass people for no proper reasons, another demonstration will be inevitable. Bullets and tear gas have never triumphed over the will of the people."

=== 17 August ===
The Concerned Citizens of Malawi staged another protest on 17 August in the form of a national vigil for the victims of the 20 July protest. The vigil was, however, cancelled a day before the protests due to the intervention of the United Nations who engaged civil society groups and the government in dialogue. The dialogue later broke down because of what the civil society groups said was continued intimidation being faced outside the meeting.

A string of arson cases were also reported, including fires at the offices of Rafiq Hajat and the home of Reverend MacDonald Sembereka. wa Mutharika was accused of being behind the arsons, particularity since he threatened protest leaders by saying he would "smoke you out." He later denied being behind the arsons. No one has been arrested or found guilty of partaking in the arson cases, but the government has condemned them.

=== 20–21 September – Red Wednesday ===
The two primary markets in Blantyre and Lilongwe were also burned down on 20 September a day before the Red Wednesday protests on 21 September.

On 21 September a national stay-at-home was organised with the aim of shutting down the economy via a general strike on what the organisers called "Red Wednesday." Businesses and banks across the country were closed; at the same time there was also a heavy police presence and protestors clad in red. People were also urged by the organisers to hold vigils at home to commemorate the deaths of Malawians killed during the protests in July. The protest was held on Wednesday to mark the day of the 19 people during the July protests; it also marks the beginning of a planned for three-day stay-at-home strike. Bingu wa Mutharika called for an end to the strike on the state-owned Malawi Broadcasting Corporation warning that "You can’t bully me into submission. [The] government can’t be taken to ransom by a few disgruntled individuals hiding in the name of civil society. If you stop people from going to work, I will deal with you." He added that the strikes were illegal, while telling people to return to work the next day.

== Domestic responses ==
Following the violence, Mutharika called on the people of Malawi to "stop the rioting and let's sit down to discuss. I have a responsibility, based on the powers vested in me by the constitution to bring law and order." After accusing the protesters of being "led by Satan," he then blamed his former deputy Joyce Banda and opposition leaders John Tembo, as well as other civil society leaders of being responsible for the violent protests. "The blood of these people who have died is on you. Let their spirits haunt you at night. This time I'll go after you! Even if you hide in holes I'll smoke you out!" He also said that those organising the protests should face the "consequences." His rhetoric saying to protesters saying that he would "smoke you out" was in reference to former United States President George W. Bush, who used the same words for Osama bin Laden.

First Lady Callista Mutharika publicly castigated the NGO's that organised the protests for allegedly being paid by Western donors to "disturb the peace" and promote homosexuality, stating that they would "go to hell." She further said that villagers should not have an interest in the protest over fuel and foreign exchange since they do not drive cars and because they don't engage in cross border trade. She urged village chiefs and the rural population at-large not to protest. Her response was received with much criticism from civil society.

=== Cabinet and army reshuffle ===
On 19 August, state-owned radio reported that Mutharika sacked his entire cabinet without announcing a reason for the move. Analysts speculated that it was related to the protests and the freeze in aid from the United Kingdom triggered by the government's response. He reappointed a new trimmed down cabinet on 7 September. However, it still included controversial posts such as his wife Callista Mutharika as a cabinet member, his brother Peter Mutharika as Minister of Foreign Affairs and former Ministry of Tourism, Wildlife and Culture Ken Lipenga as Minister of Finance, while excluding former Vice President Joyce Banda, wa Mutharika has repeatedly referred to the cabinet as a "war cabinet" charged with defending the "integrity of nation."

Mutharika hastened the retirement of the head of the army, General Marko Chiziko and appointed a new army chief after the protests. Chiziko's replacement is General Henry Odillo.

=== Zimbabwean mercenaries ===
Mutharika was accused of hiring mercenaries from Zimbabwe to patrol the streets and suppress protestors in preparation for the second protest which was to take place in the form of a national vigil. They were hired after consultations by wa Mutharika with Zimbabwean President Robert Mugabe after it became clear that the Malawian army would not shoot at Malawians during the planned protests due to discontent in the army. The Zimbabwean personnel were stationed in Lilongwe, Mzuzu, Blantayre, and Zomba.

=== 2014 presidential election ===
In spite of the nationwide protest against the Mutharika regime, in early August 2011 the DPP National Governing Council (NGC) endorsed Peter Mutharika, the presidents brother, as a presidential candidate for the 2014 presidential election. He is currently the Minister of Education, Science and Technology. This early announcement came a few days after the protests. His appointment decision was made by President Bingu wa Mutharika and endorsed by the council without a party convention. DPP Secretary General Wakuda Kamanga stated that they are optimistic that the country will elect another Mutharika in spite of the protests because the "anger would phase out." The party also sacked other leaders that had been against the promotion of the Peter Mutharika as a candidate, including first vice-president Joyce Banda and second vice-president Khumbo Kachale.

== International reactions ==
Supranational bodies

- Southern African Development Community – Executive Secretary Tomaz Salomao sent an observer mission to Malawi to gather information and report back to the SADC meeting in Luanda, Angola.

States

- United States – The Millennium Challenge Corporation, a government agency, suspended aid because it was "deeply upset" by the deaths of the 19 people during the demonstrations.

NGO

- Amnesty International – AI reported that at least 44 people were injured with gunshot wounds, and at least 8 people were killed by the security forces. It also called for an investigation into this misuse of firearms.

== See also ==
- List of protests in the 21st century
- 2019 Malawian protests
- 2019 Malawian protests and riots
