= Phwezi Foundation =

The Phwezi Foundation was formed in 1981. The foundation created Phwezi Secondary School at Phwezi was formed in 1982. In 1986 the school was split into a Phwezi Boys Secondary School and Phwezi Girls Secondary School.

== History ==
Phwezi Secondary School had been founded on 11 November 1981 by a group of four Malawians which included the diplomat Timon Sam Mangwazu, Morton Chipimpha Mughogho and Alec Nyasulu who had been the Speaker of the National Assembly, twice. The foundation has been seen as a foundation for political opposition parties in Malawi.

The schools founders had created a Foundation, with the assistance of German finances. They bought buildings that had been created by the contractors building the Chiweta road. The buildings were by the side of the South Rukuru River in the Rumphi district.

The boys who attended were making good progress, but this was not observed in the girls. It was decided to split the school by age to form Phwezi Boys Secondary School and Phwezi Girls Secondary School in 1986. In the following year the first girl was selected to go to the University of Malawi.

In 2004 Zondiwe Nkhata was the headteacher of the girls' school.

== Alumni ==
- Sarai Chisala-Tempelhoff, - leading lawyer
- Khumbo Kachali (1966 - ) went on to be Malawi's vice-President.
- Vitumbiko Mumba - minister of trade and industry of Malawi in 2024.
- Erik Paliani - musician
