= MacDonald Sembereka =

Malawian reverend, civil and human rights activist

Reverend MacDonald Sembereka is a Malawian reverend, civil and human rights activist. He is the acting national coordinator of the Human Rights Consultative Committee (HRCC), a network of 91 local civil society and non-governmental organizations. He has been at the forefront of coordinating the nationwide protests in Malawi that began July 20, 2011. In May 2021, it was revealed that he had been appointed to serve at Malawi's Mission at the United Nations in New York. His appointment was widely seen as a reward for his role in the nationwide demonstrations which contributed to the sanctioning of fresh presidential elections by Malawi's high court. Other members of the HRDC were also appointed to various Missions abroad, a move widely seen as an attempt to silence the human rights group. Sembereka is widely known for his controversial lifestyle which is widely viewed as unusual for a reverend. He also served as the Executive Director of Malawi Network of Religious Leaders Living with HIV/AIDS (MANERELA).

In 2012 Sembereka left his position as coorindator of HRCC as President Joyce Banda appointed him to a new role as Special Assistant on Non-Governmental Organisations for the Presidents Office. In 2014 Sembereka was replaced as Special Assistant on Non-Governmental Organisations by Mabvuto Bamusi. This coincided with President Joyce Banda leaving office and being replaced by Peter Mutharika whose brother and previous President Bingu wa Mutharika was strongly criticised by Sembereka.

Sembereka is a member of the COMPASS (Coalition on Minority Protection Against Sexual Stigma) coalition and has worked to decriminalise laws against homosexuality in Malawi.

== Arson Attacks ==
He was the target of an arson attack on 10 September 2011 following a similar arson attack at the office of Rafiq Hajat's Institute for Policy Interaction on 3 September 2011. His house was set on fire by petrol bomb. This arson incident came days before the nationwide protests on September 21st, 2011.
