= 2014 Malawian general election =

- 20 May 2014
- Presidential election
- Registered: 7,470,806
- Turnout: 70.75% (▼3.39 pp)
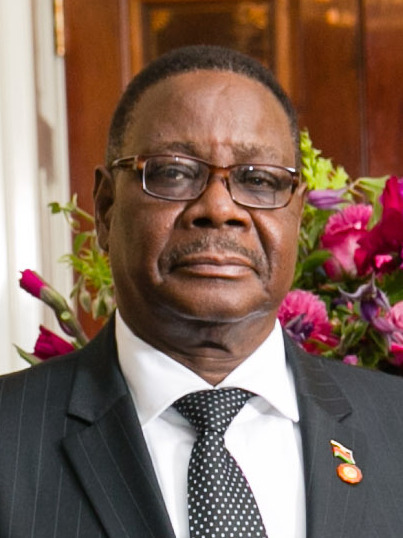

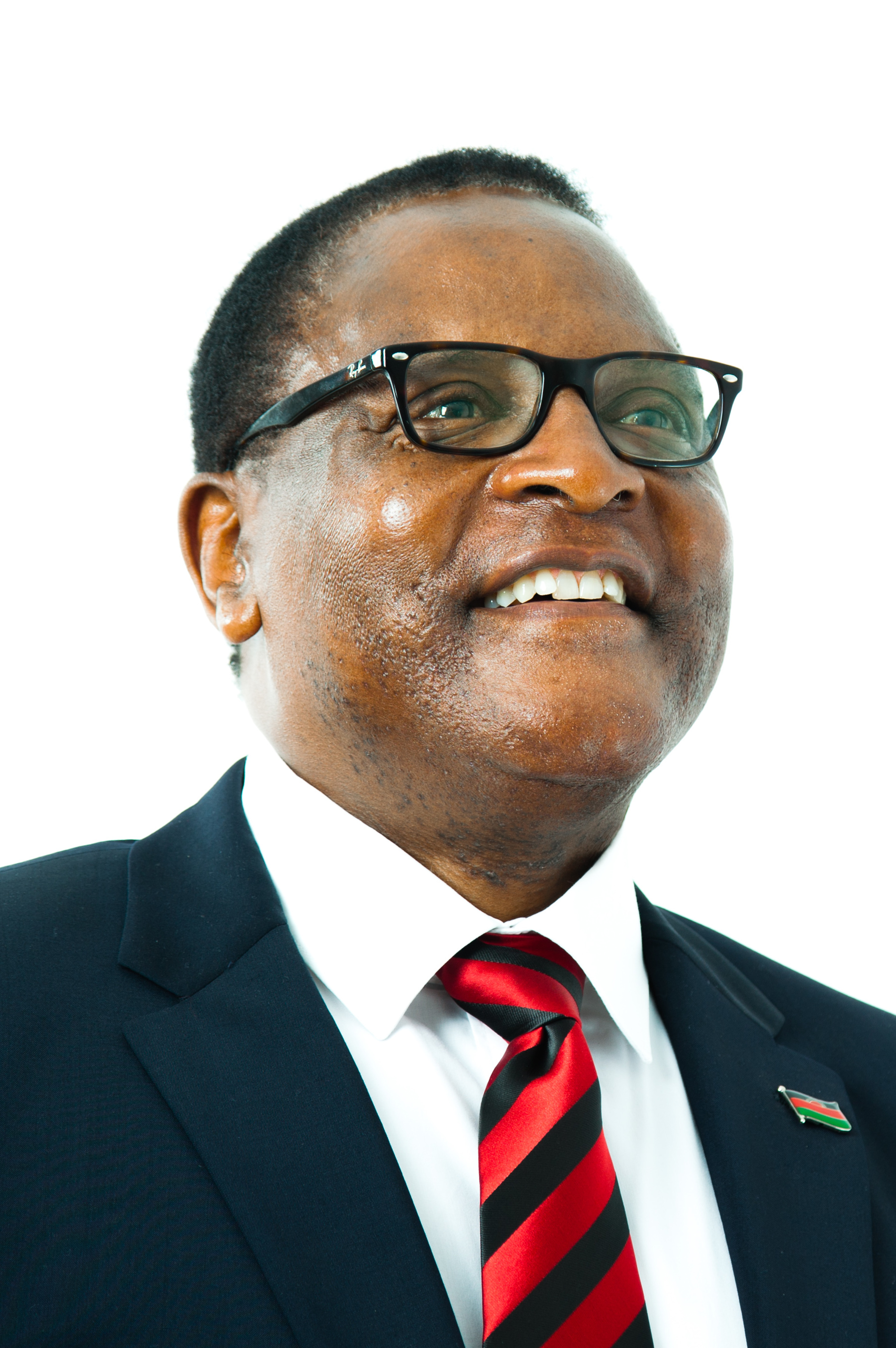

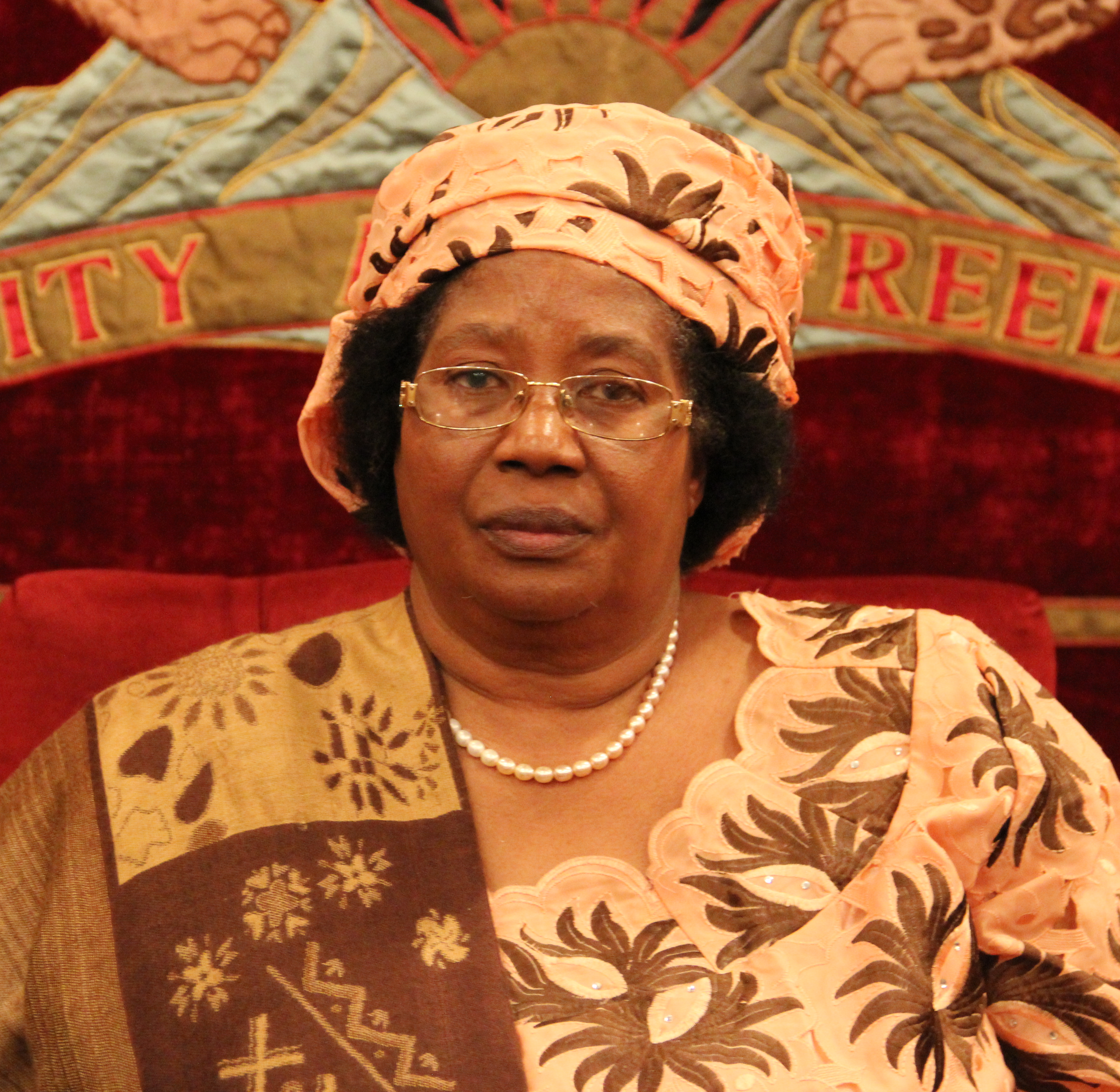

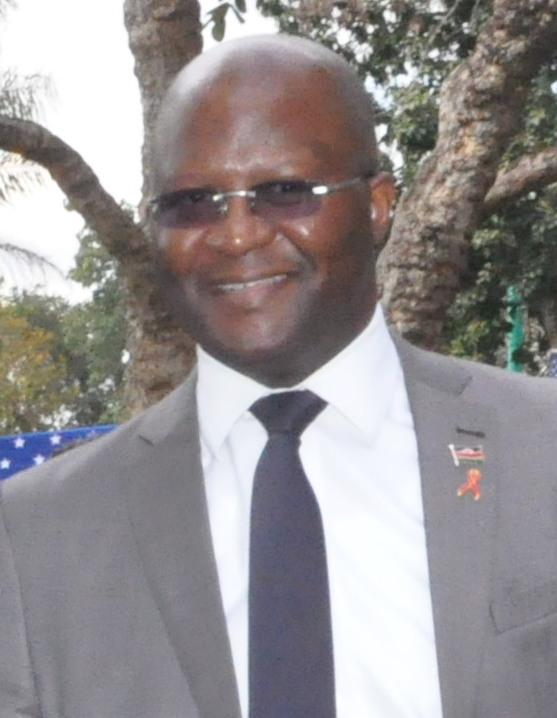
Nominee	Peter Mutharika	Lazarus Chakwera
Party	DPP	MCP
Running mate	Saulos Chilima	Richard Msowoya
Popular vote	1,904,399	1,455,880
Percentage	36.42%	27.84%
Nominee	Joyce Banda	Atupele Muluzi
Party	PP	UDF
Running mate	Sosten Gwengwe	Godfrey Chapola
Popular vote	1,056,236	717,224
Percentage	20.20%	13.72%
- Results by region (left) and district (right)
President before election
Joyce Banda
PP
Elected President
Peter Mutharika
DPP
- Legislative election
- All 193 seats in the National Assembly; 97 seats needed for a majority
- Turnout: 70.42% (▼7.59 pp)
Party	Leader	Vote %	Seats	+/–
DPP	Peter Mutharika	21.84	50	−63
PP	Joyce Banda	18.16	26	New
MCP	Lazarus Chakwera	17.41	48	+21
UDF	Atupele Muluzi	9.64	14	−3
AFORD	Godfrey Shawa	0.62	1	0
CCP	Davis Katsonga	0.21	1	New
Independents	–	29.74	52	+20
This lists parties that won seats. See the complete results below.

General elections were held in Malawi on 20 May 2014. They were Malawi's first tripartite elections, the first time the president, National Assembly and local councillors were elected on the same day. The presidential election was won by opposition candidate Peter Mutharika of the Democratic Progressive Party, who defeated incumbent President Joyce Banda.

== Background ==
Malawi's CPI increased by 27.7% in 2013, but its GDP grew by only 5%. Malawi has maintained a polity score of 6 since 2005, designating it as a democracy. Malawi's previous presidential election in 2009 was only the fourth such election in the country's history following the end of Hastings Banda's period of one-man rule in 1994.

Bingu wa Mutharika, who had won the 2004 election, picked his foreign minister Joyce Banda to be vice president after successfully contesting the 2009 election. She was expelled from the Democratic Progressive Party and formed the People's Party when she refused to endorse President Bingu wa Mutharika's younger brother Peter Mutharika for president in the 2014 general election.

Bingu wa Mutharika died of a heart attack on 5 April 2012, and Joyce Banda took the presidency two days later, in accordance with the constitution, despite protests from some ruling party officials that Banda's expulsion from the ruling party made her ineligible.

The People's Party entered the election with a sitting president, but little in the way of a grass-roots machine.

== Presidential candidates ==
Twelve candidates were allowed to contest in the election by the Malawi Electoral Commission:

Portrait	Nominee	Party	Running mate
	Joyce Banda	People's Party (PP)	Sosten Gwengwe
	Peter Mutharika	Democratic Progressive Party (DPP)	Saulos Chilima
	Lazarus Chakwera	Malawi Congress Party (MCP)	Richard Msowoya
	Atupele Muluzi	United Democratic Front (UDF)	Godfrey Chapola
	James Nyondo	National Salvation Front (NASAF)	Ethel Changa
	Mark Katsonga	Progressive Party Movement (PPM)	Jacob Mbunge
	Davis Katsonga	Chipani cha Pfuko (CCP)	Godfrey Matenganya
	George Nnesa	Tisinthe Alliance (TA)	Sylvester Chabuka
	Hellen Singh	United Independent Party (UIP)	Chrissy Tembo
	Kamuzu Chibambo	People's Transformation Party (Petra)	White Scander
	Friday Jumbe	Labour Party (LP)	Joseph Kubwalo
	John Chisi	Umodzi Party (UP)	William Tayub

== Opinion polls ==
The Malawi Electoral Commission cautions that opinion pollsters in Malawi often have questionable credentials and publish biased reports. Some opinion polls have been criticised for lacking credibility and using non-scientific methods.

Poll source	Date	Sample size	Joyce Banda (PP)	Peter Mutharika (DPP)	Lazarus Chakwera (MCP)	Atupele Muluzi (UDF)
Research Tech Consultants	April 2014	3,883	42%	10%	23%	10%
Nyasa Times Media	April 2014	79,030	30%	19%	29%	22%
Afrobarometer	April 2014	2,400	14%	27%	21%	14%
Election Results	30 May 2014		20.2%	36.4%	27.8%	13.7%

== Results ==
Amid a breakdown in electronic systems for relaying results back to IEC headquarters, Banda claimed fraud and attempted to cancel the election after only one third of the votes were counted, and Peter Mutharika, brother of the president who died in 2012, was well ahead. Banda said another vote should be held within 90 days, and she said she would not be standing, but opposition parties and the Malawi Law Society objected.

Court action ensued, but the IEC said the first count would be completed, and a recount started. The result would only be announced after the recount, estimated to take two months. On 30 May 2014, the High Court ruled that any recount must be done within eight days of the vote; since the allowed period had already ended, the court ruled that the electoral commission should announce the results. Accordingly, the electoral commission declared later in the day that Mutharika had won the presidential election with 36.4% of the vote. Another opposition candidate, Lazarus Chakwera of the MCP, received 27.8%, while Banda trailed in third place with 20.2%. The head of the commission, Maxon Mbendera, said that "the rule of law compels us to release the results", although he acknowledged that some of the commission's members had "reservations" about them. Banda quickly said that she accepted the outcome, although she continued to describe the vote as "fraudulent".

Mutharika was sworn in as president on the morning of 31 May 2014. Banda congratulated Mutharika and called for national unity, urging the people to support the new president and wishing him success. An inauguration ceremony for Mutharika was held in Blantyre on 2 June 2014. Banda was not present at the inauguration, held at Kamuzu Stadium, and her absence was viewed by some as a snub, given the history of bitter rivalry between the two. Mutharika said that he was offering an olive branch and wanted to "bury the past", expressing "regret" at Banda's absence. He said that he was not interested in "vengeance", although he added that "those who have broken the law will face the full course of justice".

=== President ===
Candidate	Running mate	Party	Votes	%
Peter Mutharika	Saulos Chilima	Democratic Progressive Party	1,904,399	36.42
Lazarus Chakwera	Richard Msowoya	Malawi Congress Party	1,455,880	27.84
Joyce Banda	Sosten Gwengwe	People's Party	1,056,236	20.20
Atupele Muluzi	Godfrey Chapola	United Democratic Front	717,224	13.72
Kamuzu Chibambo	White Scander	People's Transformation Party	19,360	0.37
Mark Katsonga	Jacob Mbunge	People's Progressive Movement	15,830	0.30
John Chisi	William Tayub	Umodzi Party	12,048	0.23
George Nnesa	Sylvester Chabuka	Malawi Forum for Unity and Development	11,042	0.21
James Nyondo	Ethel Changa	National Salvation Front	10,623	0.20
Hellen Singh	Chrissy Tembo	United Independent Party	9,668	0.18
Friday Jumbe	Joseph Kubwalo	Labour Party	8,819	0.17
Davis Katsonga	Godfrey Matenganya	Chipani cha Pfuko	7,454	0.14
Total			5,228,583	100.00
Valid votes			5,228,583	98.93
Invalid/blank votes			56,695	1.07
Total votes			5,285,278	100.00
Registered voters/turnout			7,470,806	70.75

=== National Assembly ===
Party	Votes	%	Seats	+/–
Democratic Progressive Party	1,123,020	21.84	50	−63
People's Party	933,923	18.16	26	New
Malawi Congress Party	895,528	17.41	48	+21
United Democratic Front	495,865	9.64	14	−3
People's Progressive Movement	33,817	0.66	0	0
Alliance for Democracy	31,907	0.62	1	0
United Independent Party	24,132	0.47	0	New
National Salvation Front	19,616	0.38	0	New
Nthanda Congress Party	16,497	0.32	0	New
New Rainbow Coalition	14,091	0.27	0	0
Chipani cha Pfuko	10,545	0.21	1	New
New Labour Party	4,473	0.09	0	New
Umodzi Party	3,145	0.06	0	New
Malawi Forum for Unity and Development	2,814	0.05	0	−1
People's Transformation Party	2,746	0.05	0	0
Maravi People's Party	733	0.01	0	−1
People's Democratic Movement	471	0.01	0	New
Independents	1,529,739	29.74	52	+20
Vacant			1	–
Total	5,143,062	100.00	193	0
Valid votes	5,143,062	98.57		
Invalid/blank votes	74,634	1.43		
Total votes	5,217,696	100.00		
Registered voters/turnout	7,409,288	70.42		

=== Local government ===
Party	Votes	%	Seats
Democratic Progressive Party			165
Malawi Congress Party			131
People's Party			65
United Democratic Front			57
Chipani cha Pfuko			2
Alliance for Democracy			1
National Salvation Front			1
Independents			35
Vacant			5
Total			462
Valid votes	5,032,823	97.65	
Invalid/blank votes	121,170	2.35	
Total votes	5,153,993	100.00	
Source: Nyasa Times, Shanghai Daily
