= Chimunthu Banda =

Malawian politician

Henry Chimunthu-Banda MP
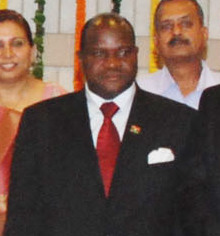
- Banda in 2011

Speaker of the National Assembly of Malawi
- In office 15 June 2009 – May 2014
- President: Bingu wa Mutharika; Joyce Banda

Member of Parliament
- Incumbent
- Assumed office 19 May 1999
- Constituency: Nkhotakota North

Minister of Mines, Natural Resources and Environmental Affairs
- President: Bingu wa Mutharika

Personal details
- Born: 30 September 1962 (age 63) Chipembere Village, Nkhotakota District, Nyasaland (now Malawi)
- Party: Democratic Progressive Party

Henry Chimunthu Banda is a Malawian politician who was the Speaker of the National Assembly of Malawi from May 2009 to May 2014. He was elected in 2009 as the Chair of the 19 member Commonwealth Parliamentary Association, Africa region.

He also served for a time as Minister of Energy and Minister of Mining, Youth Sports and Culture.

== Early life and education ==
Banda is from Chipembere village in Nkhotakota District, Central Malawi. He received a Diploma in Education obtained from the University of Malawi in 1984. Subsequently, he earned a Diploma in Education Management which he acquired from Brandon University. He joined the Ministry of Education as a Diploma teacher in 1985 and was posted to Euthini Secondary School in Northern Malawi until May 1989. He was posted to his home district of Nkhotakota where he rose to become headteacher of the school. In 1993-1995, he became the Regional Publications Officer for the National Teachers Union of Malawi.

== Political career ==
At the 1999 general elections, Hon C Banda was elected as Member of Parliament for the Nkhotakota North Constituency, and from August 1999 to September 2001, he was Chairman of the Parliamentary Committee on the Environment. From January 2000 to September 2001, he was Commissioner in the Parliamentary Service Commission and subsequently Minister of Mines, Natural Resources and Environmental Affairs. In June 2004 he was appointed as the Minister of Youth, Sports and Culture. He also served as Minister of Energy and Mining and helped to secure the Paladin Energy mining deal with Goodall Gondwe. He also served as Deputy Minister of Foreign Affairs in 2003.

In June 2009 he was the DPP secretary-general when he was elected to be the speaker in the National Assembly. His first and second deputies were Johns Chingola and Juliana Nanyoni Mphande.

== Personal life ==
Chimunthu-Banda is married and has three children with whom he and his wife reside with in Lilongwe.

Diplomatic posts
| Preceded by Louis Chimango | Speaker of the National Assembly of Malawi; 2009–2014 | Succeeded by Richard Msowoya |
