= Ken Lipenga =

Malawian politician (born 1952)

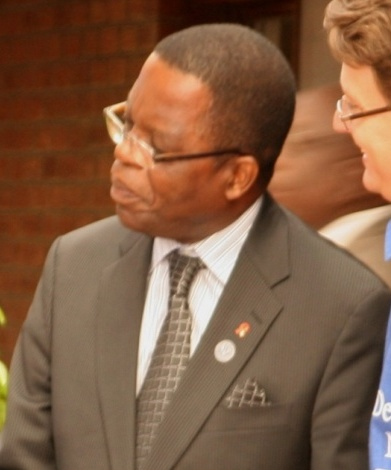
- Lipenga in 2011

Member of Parliament
- In office 1997–2014
- Constituency: Phalombe East

Personal details
- Born: Ken Diston Lipenga; 14 February 1952 (age 74) Chiringa, Malawi
- Children: Timwa Lipenga, Phindu Lipenga, Ken Lipenga Junior, Enuku Lipenga, Orama Lipenga, Onivaha Lipenga
- Occupation: Politician, journalist, writer

Ken Diston Lipenga (born 14 February 1952) is a Malawian politician, journalist, and writer. He was the Member of Parliament for Phalombe East from 1997 to 2014. He has served in various ministerial positions.

== Personal life ==
Ken Diston Lipenga was born on 14 February 1952 at Chiringa, Phalombe District. He attended Nazombe Primary School and then went to Mulanje Day Secondary School. Lipenga entered the University of Malawi, enrolling at Soche Hill College in 1972 and graduating with a B.Ed. (Distinction) in 1976. He majored in English and History as well as Education. He then completed an M.A at the University of Leeds in 1978. Lipenga won a Graduate Assistantship to study for Ph.D. in English Literature at the University of New Brunswick in Canada and graduated in 1984. His thesis was entitled "Alienation in the Novels of Ayi Kwei Armah". He returned home to continue with his teaching work at Chancellor College.

Lipenga is married to Stella. He is a recreational angler, photographer and mountain climber. In his spare time, he has done research on the Lomwe language. Two of his children, Dr Timwa Lipenga and Prof Ken Lipenga Junior, are also writers.

== Career ==
=== Early career ===
After working as a management trainee at the Blantyre Printing and Publishing Company, Lipenga joined the faculty of the University of Malawi at Chancellor College as an Assistant Lecturer in English. He left to complete his PhD in Canada and returned home to teach at Chancellor College. In 1986 he returned to Blantyre Printing and Publishing Company as General Manager and Editor-in-Chief of Blantyre Newspapers Ltd. In 1992 Lipenga was dismissed from his job following a series of provocative articles under his column, Off the Cuff. The article, "Of Gallileo as Dissident," metaphorically criticized one-party rule under the Kamuzu Banda regime and sided with those calling for multi-party rule. Lipenga moved to Nkolokosa and worked as a Reuters and Radio Netherlands correspondent.

After meeting Aleke Banda, who had just been released from political detention, he joined a group that sympathized with the United Democratic Front (UDF). When Banda and family decided to establish The Nation newspaper in 1993, Lipenga became the founding Editor-In-Chief. He resigned in 1995 upon being appointed Special Assistant to then-President Bakili Muluzi.

=== Political career ===
Lipenga became MP for Phalombe East in a 1997 by-election. From 1999 to 2004 he served as Minister of Education, Science & technology. He then worked as Minister of Information, Communication and Tourism between 2004 and 2005. From 2005 to 2006 he served as Minister of Labour & Vocational Training. In 2007 he served as Minister of Trade & Industry. Then from 2007 to 2008 he was the Deputy Minister of Finance. In 2008 he was the Minister of Economic Planning and Development in the DPP ruled cabinet. He was then Minister of Tourism, Wildlife and Culture until 2011, when he was appointed as Minister of Finance.

His time as Minister of Finance was controversial due to the economic policies of the Bingu wa Mutharika Administration, which led to protests on 20 July 2011. He served as well under the presidency of Joyce Banda until 10 October 2013, when he was dropped in a cabinet reshuffle and replaced with Maxwell Mkwezalamba following the Capital Hill Cashgate Scandal.

Lipenga was unseated by independent candidate Amos Mailosi in the 2014 general election.

== Works Published ==
- Lipenga, Ken (1981). Waiting for a Turn: Short Stories. Popular Publications.
- Lipenga, Ken (1986). Of "been-tos" and Messiahs: Millenialism in Armah's Fiction. University of Malawi.
