= Alec Nyasulu =

Malawian politician (1920–1987)

Speaker of the National Assembly
- In office March 1971 – February 1975
- Preceded by: Ismail K. Surtee
- Succeeded by: Nelson P. W. Khonje
- In office 6 July 1964 – October 1964
- Preceded by: Position established
- Succeeded by: Ismail K. Surtee

Speaker of the Legislative Assembly
- In office 1964 – 6 July 1964
- Preceded by: Position established
- Succeeded by: Position abolished

Speaker of the Legislative Council
- In office 13 August 1963 – 1964
- Preceded by: W. Wenban-Smith
- Succeeded by: Position abolished

Personal details
- Born: 23 February 1920; Mzimba District, Nyasaland
- Died: February 1987 (aged 66–67)
- Political party: MCP
- Profession: Politician

Alec Mjuma Nyasulu (23 February 1920 – 1987) (Note: His biography from the Malawi Parliament listed his birth date as 23 February 1920, although the Historical Dictionary of Malawi stated that he was born in 1918.) was a Malawian politician who served as the Speaker of the National Assembly (Note: The legislature was known as the Legislative Council when he took office in 1963, was known as the Legislative Assembly for a time in 1964 before being renamed to the National Assembly later that year.) from 1963 to 1964 and again from 1971 to 1975.

== Biography ==
Nyasulu was born in Mzimba District, Nyasaland, on 23 February 1920, although the Historical Dictionary of Malawi listed his birthplace as Rumphi. After receiving an education at local schools, he later studied to become a teacher at the Overtoun Institute, run by a Presbyterian mission in Livingstonia. After studying there, he became a primary school teacher at Emoneni and Enkondhlwen where he served from 1939 to 1942. During this time, he also studied privately and received a Junior Certificate and a General Certificate of Education.

Nyasulu joined the Army during World War II and served in India, Ceylon, and across East and Central Africa. He was demobilized in 1946, having achieved the rank of Warrant Officer II. Afterwards, Nyasulu worked as a teacher for local schools before attending the Institute of Education, University of London, where he was one of the first students from Nyasaland. When he came back to Nyasaland, he was hired as an instructor for the Training Centre at Domasi, later being appointed Rumphi inspector of schools in 1956.

In 1961, Nyasulu entered politics, being elected to the Legislative Council under the banner of the Malawi Congress Party (MCP). He was elected from the Mzimba South Constituency. On 13 August 1963, he was appointed to be the Speaker of the Legislative Council, resigning his seat to take up the position. He was the first African speaker of the legislature. He remained speaker as the legislature became the Legislative Assembly in 1964, and then became the National Assembly as Nyasaland became the independent state of Malawi. He was the first speaker of the country after they became independent, remaining in the position until October 1964, when he was succeeded by Ismail K. Surtee.

Nyasulu subsequently served a number of ministerial positions, including being the Minister of Natural Resources in 1965, Minister of Health until re-appointment to Minister of Education in January 1966, Minister of State for External Affairs in 1967, and Minister of Health and Community Development in 1969. He was re-appointed to be the Speaker of the National Assembly in March 1971, to succeed Surtee.

Nyasulu later fell out of favor with President Hastings Banda, who dismissed him as speaker in February 1975, suspended him from the MCP, and then imprisoned him without trial. He was released from prison in 1977. Afterwards, he worked as a prominent tobacco farmer in Mzimba. His MCP membership was restored in the 1980s and he was made chairman of the Malawi Housing Corporation. He was one of the founders of the Phwezi Foundation whose Secondary School in 1982 later split to form the Phwezi Boys Secondary School and the Phwezi Girls Secondary School in 1986.

== Personal life ==
Nyasulu was married and had six children. He died in 1987.
