= Chakakala Chaziya =

Malawian bank governor and politician (1947–2000))

Minister of Finance of Malawi
- In office 1981–1984
- Preceded by: Louis Chimango
- Succeeded by: Edward Bwanali

Governor of the Reserve Bank of Malawi
- In office 1989–1986
- Preceded by: John Tembo

Governor of the Reserve Bank of Malawi

Personal details
- Born: 31 March 1947 Lilongwe District, Central Region, Nyasaland (now Malawi)
- Died: 2000 (aged 52–53)
- Party: Malawi Congress Party (c. 1971 onwards)
- Children: Jessica Chakakala Chaziya

Lynold Chakakala Chaziya (31 March 1947 – 2000) was a Malawian statesman, economist and politician who served as the Minister of Finance and the Central Bank/Reserve Bank of Malawi Governor under Dr. Hastings Kamuzu Banda's MCP regime and also served as Board Chairperson of various parastatals/government agencies like OILCOM (the precursor of NOCMA), Limbe Leaf Tobacco Limited and various others.

Born on 31 March 1947, with his first wife Anne Kafaaiwala he had three children Lawrence, Geoffrey and Lynold Jr. At the dawn of multi-party democracy in 1992 he came together with other former cabinet ministers of Dr. Banda's era like Elson Bakili Muluzi, Edward Chitsulo Bwanali and other willing Malawians to form a pressure group United Democratic Front (UDF) championing the return of Malawi to political party pluralism as was the case in the 1960s. He was its First Vice Chairman with Dr. George Afawaka Mkandawire as Second Vice Chairman and Elson Bakili Muluzi as its Chairman. The grouping couldn't be called a political party then as Malawi was a one-party state and thus the constitution was only recognising the existence of Malawi Congress Party. Later the UDF was to form the new government in a new multi-party era in 1994 United Democratic Front.

== Background ==
Chaziya was born on 31 March 1947 in Likuni, Lilongwe, the capital of Malawi. Chaziya attended several primary schools before graduating to Blantyre Secondary School attended Zomba Secondary School in Zomba, the former capital of Malawi.

He was a Minister of Finance from 1981 to 1984 and bank governor during the 1980s.

Chaziya died in 2000.

== Arrests ==
Chaziya was arrested in Lilongwe at his home on 5 January 1993. His arrest was followed after an official of the then ruling party, Malawi Congress Party (MCP), had publicly accused him of being involvement with a news magazine that was critical of the government. The news was published by the anonymous exile government opponents and was smuggled into Malawi. The magazine hadly advocated the violence and it hardly had any connection with UDF or Chaziya himself. Chaziya was accused with other three namely Johnson, Khoswe and a driver were arrested two days before Chaziya. A vehicle whose owner was Khoswe, a businessman from Lilongwe, was stopped by the police at a roadblock and the two occupants, Johnson and the driver were arrested whereas the owner of the vehicle was arrested the following day. The four were held in Maula prison in Lilongwe without any charge or official explanation. Chaziya was bailed on 22 January 1993.
