= Joseph Mwanamveka =

Malawian economist, banker and politician

Minister of Finance and Economic Affairs
- Incumbent
- Assumed office 5 October 2025
- President: Peter Mutharika
- Preceded by: Simplex Chithyola Banda

Minister of Finance and Economic Affairs
- In office 2019–2020
- President: Peter Mutharika
- Preceded by: Goodall Gondwe
- Succeeded by: Felix Mlusu

Personal details
- Born: 19 October 1964 (age 61) Malawi
- Party: Democratic Progressive Party (Malawi)
- Education: University of Malawi

Joseph Mathyola Mwanamveka is a Malawian economist, banker and politician who serves as the Minister of Finance and Economic Affairs, having been appointed to that position in October 2025 by President Peter Mutharika. He previously held the same post under earlier administrations, and has held senior roles in Malawi’s banking and finance sectors, as well as in Cabinet portfolios under the Democratic Progressive Party.

== Early life and education ==
Mwanamveka trained as an economist and studied at the University of Malawi, where he obtained undergraduate and postgraduate qualifications in economics. He later undertook executive training and short courses overseas, including programmes described as being associated with international institutions and executive training.

== Career ==
=== Banking and civil service ===
Mwanamveka began his professional career in Malawi’s financial sector and held senior positions at the Reserve Bank of Malawi and in several state and private financial institutions. He served in management positions at Continental Discount House and as chief executive of Malawi Savings Bank, and was reported to have helped establish or strengthen financial-markets functions at the central bank early in his career. He was reported to have served in senior treasury and public finance roles before entering frontline politics, and to have acted as an alternate governor to international financial institutions on behalf of Malawi at times during his public service.

=== Ministerial and political career ===
Mwanamveka entered national politics with the Democratic Progressive Party (DPP) and won election as Member of Parliament for Chiradzulu South. He was appointed to cabinet posts during DPP administrations, including serving as Minister of Trade and Industry and later as Minister of Agriculture before being appointed Minister of Finance and Economic Affairs in the late 2010s. He also served as Finance Minister between 2019 and 2020.

Following a period in opposition, he continued to be a senior figure within the DPP and served in party leadership roles, including as a regional vice-president and as the party’s spokesperson on finance in Parliament.

In October 2025, he was reappointed Minister of Finance and Economic Affairs by President Peter Mutharika after Mutharika returned to office, marking a high-profile cabinet comeback to the treasury portfolio. This appointment was widely reported by international wire services and national press. In 2026 his financial plans predicted a 4% growth in GDP and a reduction in inflation to 15%. The budget's largest allocation was for education to fund free primary and secondary education.

== Controversies and legal matters ==
Mwanamveka’s career included moments of controversy that attracted media and legal attention. In early January 2025 he was reported to have been arrested by Malawian authorities in connection with investigations into public procurement and alleged irregular payments; the Malawi Police Service issued a confirmation of the arrest.

Later in 2025, at least one court decision was reported which found that he was not liable in relation to a high-value loan matter connected to the Reserve Bank of Malawi; local reporting described a May 2025 ruling that removed certain liabilities.

In June 2026 Human Rights Commissioner Habiba Osman was interviewed concerning the progress Malawi had made in gender equality. Malawi's Gender Equality Act requires that neither gender can hold less than 40% of positions in Malawi. However Mwanamvekha had created a Revenue Appeals Tribunal to settle tax disputes that was all men. Osman said the commission had a serious concern about the disregard for the law. Women created most of the wealth but they were not having equal access to decisions.

== Policy positions and reputation ==
During his earlier ministerial term, Mwanamveka was reported to have prioritized fiscal stability and donor engagement; press coverage described efforts to restore donor confidence and stabilise macroeconomic indicators while he held the finance portfolio. He was also credited in published profiles with promoting local industry initiatives during his time in trade and industry posts. Commentators and business press described him as a technocratic figure with experience in public finance and banking.
