= Juliana Mphande =

Malawian politician

Juliana Nanyoni Mphande
- Occupation: politician
- Known for: parliament's Deputy speaker
- Predecessor: Gerald Mponda
- Political party: Democratic Progressive Party

Juliana Nanyoni Mphande is a Malawian politician who stood as an independent parliamentary candidate in 2004. In 2009 she was successfully elected to parliament for the Democratic Progressive Party and she became the house's second deputy speaker.

== Career ==
In the 2004 election she stood as an independent candidate in the Blantyre South West Constituency and she came second to another independent candidate, Gerald Mponda.

In the 2009 election she was a Democratic Progressive Party committee member for the Southern Region when there was a 50:50 campaign to increase the number of women in parliament. She stood again as the DPP candidate in the Blantyre South West Constituency. Over 20,000 votes were cast and she won when she took more that 8,000 of them. The DPP were popular. Chimunthu Banda who was the DPP secretary-general, was elected to be the speaker in the National Assembly. His first and second deputies were Johns Chingola and Juliana Nanyoni Mphande.

She made errors in June 2013 as deputy speaker. She was required to complete the third reading of a bill and to confirm that it had been passed. By mistake she started new business prematurely and she had to be reminded that she had forgotten the conventions of the house. Later that month the speaker had to be called to calm the house after she announced that a bill had been given a "Yes" when the members were favouring "No" and asking for a division. She had a member of the house, Glad Chembe Munthali, thrown out as he objected and swore. She returned to "re-pronounce" the verdict
