= 2019 Malawian protests =

2019-20 Malawian protests
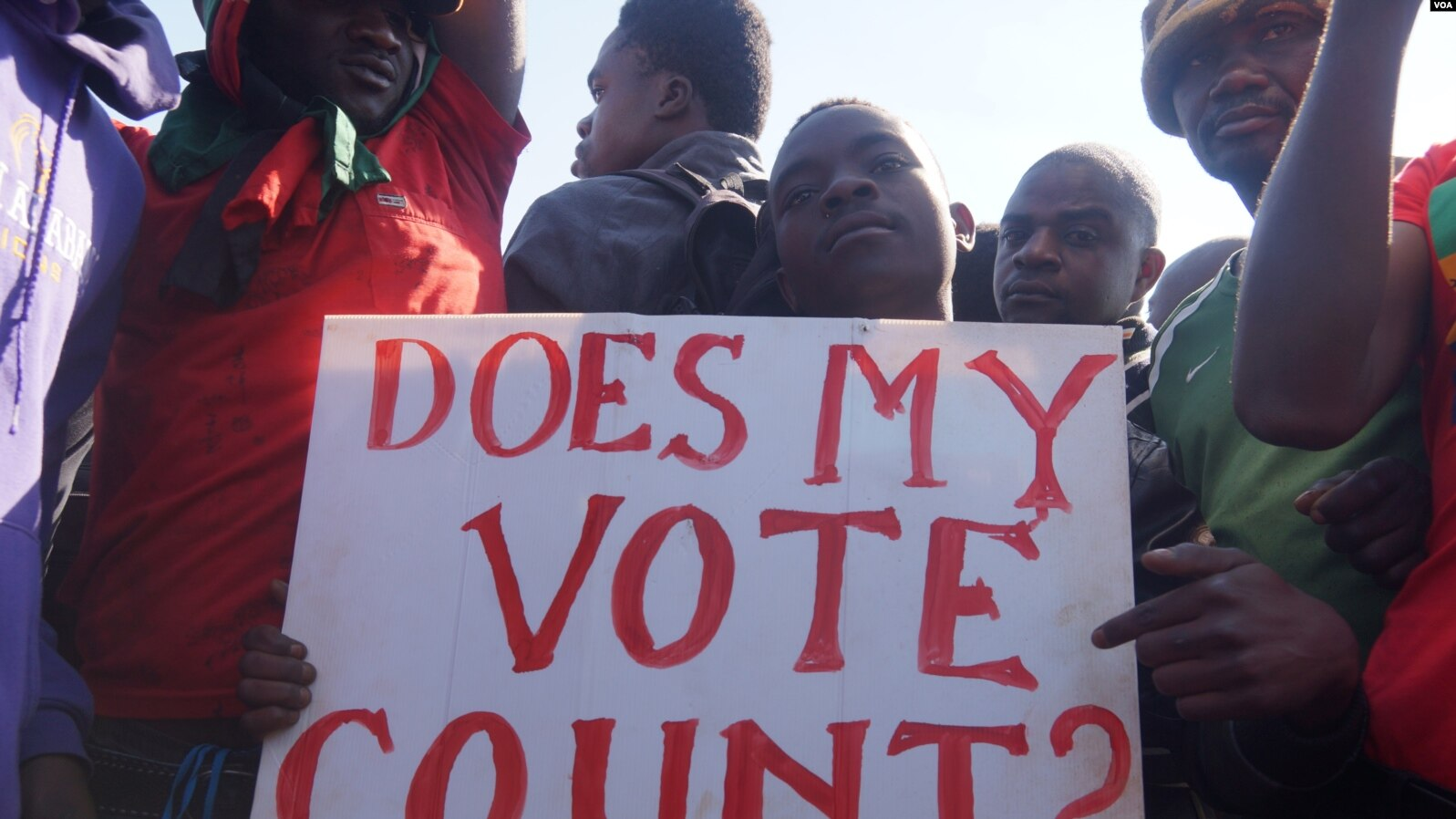
- Activists with the Human Rights Defenders Coalition protest the results of the 2019 Malawian general election
- Date: May 2019 – October 2020
- Location: Malawi
- Caused by: Alleged electoral fraud during the 2019 Malawian general election
- Goals: Resignation of President Peter Mutharika; Fresh general elections
- Methods: Demonstrations, Riots
- Result: Protests suppressed by force; 2020 Malawian general election; Annulment of 2019 Malawian general election

Deaths and injuries
- Death: Dozens
- Injuries: Unknown

The 2019 Malawian protests were a series of nationwide rallies and strikes about government pensions, the results of the 2019 Malawian general election and demands for democratic reforms. Anti-presidential unrest was met with police violence against demonstrators. Soon, they used live rounds, tear gas and batons to disperse protesters who protested for three months against the president.

== Background ==
Malawi has a history of unrest and violence, yet drug trafficking and cigar rate trades are high. Many are now dying due to poverty and issues which has struck the country since the 1990s. After the 2005 Malawian food crisis, food security in Malawi became a concern for international aid groups and many have been frequently detained and criticising the government and its economic policies yet the handling of the deadlock inside of the poor nation. After nationwide pro-democracy demonstrations in 2009, the 2011 Malawian protests ultimately led to the 2012 Malawian constitutional crisis. The demonstrations are not just about the election results, but also over various issues that reflect a general lack of trust in the government.

== Protests ==
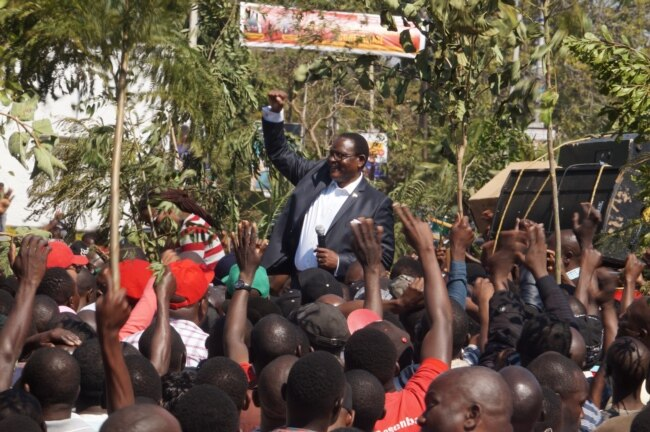
Opposition Malawi Congress Party leader Lazarus Chakwera addresses election protesters in Blantyre (2019)

Mass protests began after the 2019 Malawian general election results were announced and demands for annulment for the elections were chanted as the military was sent in to keep the mass demonstrations from spreading. Soon, Peter Mutharika, president of Malawi, ordered troops to areas across the country to disperse the protesters. Rallies continued despite the military.

Anti-government unrest escalated into violence, and water cannon and bullets were fired at demonstrators to disperse them. Many were killed in June 9 rallies when blockades and chants were made and heard. Lilongwe was a centre of protests, with all of its suburbs experiencing demonstrations.

Spontaneous outbursts of protests exploded into rioting and peaceful demonstrations turned violent. Protesters demanded the resignation of the government and an end to police brutality and the resignation of the head of the election commission. Post-election protests continued, with clashes into July.

The unrest prompted outcries from many governments across the world, asking the president Peter Mutharika to step down and hold new elections as soon as possible. As protests spread, a crackdown followed with many being shot, and hundreds injured.

By the fall of 2019, when a wave of unrest was sweeping the world, mass protests turned larger and larger and thousands protested against president Peter Mutharika in August–September. A wave of anti-electoral body protests swept towns surrounding the capital and government buildings across the country. In October–November, a bulk of protests took place, with a movement by teachers, sanitation workers, airline staff and truck drivers taking place from October 2019-January 2020. Muslim and Christians clashed in November after a school run by an Anglican church banned girls from wearing hijabs. The regular anti-government protests and a widespread anti-irregularities movement was the biggest protests and deadliest since the 2011 Malawian protests. Students protested in November–March demanding the resignation of the government but they were soon met with force and brutality.

== Aftermath and further protests ==
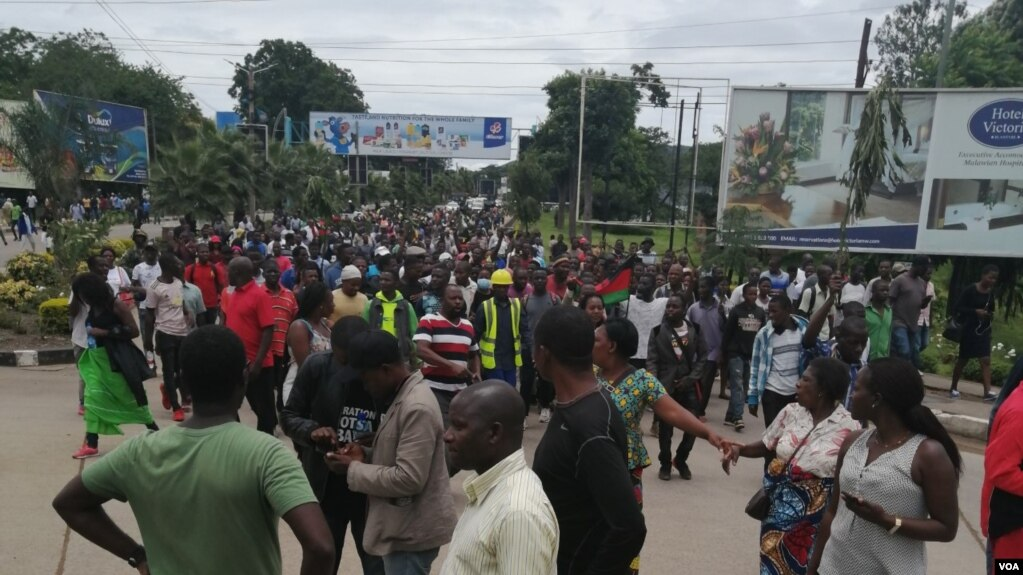
Protesters march toward the Malawi Electoral Commission office in Blantyre (2020)

Police stations and metro grounds have also been torched in some areas, especially at the height of the movement in June and July. Farmers, miners, peasants, employees, retirees and university students marched and protested in the country throughout 2019 and into the first months of 2020. These fresh protests heated tensions with police, but they didn't respond as harshly in 2020 in 2019. Dozens were killed in the mass protests of May–July 2019.

The results of the election were annulled after being sent to court, and the opposition won the 2020 Malawian general election after a new election was held. Women protested in October against violence against women and were met with tear gas.

Several were killed in the last wave of protests in 2020 when police fired tear gas to disperse the civil unrest gripping towns and villages across the country.

== See also ==
- 2011 Malawian protests
- 2019 Malawian general election
