= Undule Mwakasungula =

Malawian human rights activist

- Known for: Human Rights Activism
- Title: Former director for the Centre for Human Rights and Rehabilitation

Undule Mwakasungula is a retired human rights activist in Malawi. He led the Human Rights Consultative Committee. He took a leading role in government protests in 2011 and spoke out in defence of gay rights.

== Life ==
Mwakasungula was the chairperson for the Human Rights Consultative Committee (HRCC). He was a director for the Centre for Human Rights and Rehabilitation (CHRR), a network of Church Institutions, Human Rights NGOs and the Law Society of Malawi that work for human rights, advocacy and information sharing. HRCC and Mwakasungula was one of the primary organizers of the July 20th, 2011 Malawian protests. He was a critic of the Bingu wa Mutharika administration, likening it to Robert Mugabe's Administration of Zimbabwe, "We are almost Zimbabwe, both in the economy and in political governance."

== Malawi Protests ==
Mwakasungula was credited with organising protests in Lilongwe, and he left the country but returned. He went into hiding briefly after the July 20, 2011 protests in Malawi. He has been acting as a spokesperson for the protest leaders and announced the postponement of the August 17th protests.

== Gay rights activism ==
He has come under criticism by anti-gay civil society groups in Malawi due to his defense of gay and lesbians in Malawi and being outspoken against the criminalization of homosexuality.
