= Bernard Sande =

Malawian civil servant and diplomat

Bernard Sande is a Malawian civil servant and diplomat. He was the Malawian Ambassador to the United Kingdom. Prior to this appointment, he was the Malawian Ambassador to the United States. He has also worked as a diplomat in Germany in the past, and he served for a time as Principal Secretary for Education, Foreign Service and Private Sector Development.

When he was Malawi's ambassador to the U.K., his deputy was John Tembo Jr.

Sande concluded his contract as Secretary for Foreign Affairs in August 2024. On the following day he became chief adviser for the Ministry of Foreign Affairs.
