= Zero Deficit Budget of Malawi =

Financial strategy by Ken Kandodo

The Zero Deficit Budget of Malawi (ZDB) was a financial strategy laid out by Minister of Finance Ken Kandodo of Malawi in 2011 under the Bingu wa Mutharika administration that is based on zero-based budgeting. This was a new approach to economic financial budgeting for 'least developed countries' where the government aimed to finance all the recurrent expenditures using its own domestic resources. Kandodo mentioned that this new ZDB is based on several consultations and studies, he did not cite any country on which he will model the zero-deficit budget approach nor a successfully executed Zero Deficit budget. The budget was one of the causes of the 2011 Malawian protests.

== Reception ==
The Economics Association of Malawi noted that although the budget was based on four important cornerstones: 1) global economic outlook; 2) Millennium Development Goals (MGDs) priorities; 3) fiscal discipline with clearly spelt expenditure controls and 4) prioritising allocation of resources towards revenue generating areas". The budget also included budget reform measures of zero-budget, Medium Term Expenditure Framework and also a calculated financial risk.

According to the Malawi Knowledge Network, the budget statement highlighted milestones that Malawi had achieved such as unprecedented economic growth rates, single rate inflation, reduced bank rate and a stable Malawi Kwacha. It also highlighted advancement in terms of food security, HIV/AIDS reduction, maternal and infant mortality reduction and infrastructure development.

Former finance minister of Malawi Friday Jumbe noted that "the concept in itself is not bad, but that the move seems to be reactionary to potential donor freeze." He also noted that social sectors like education and health will be the most affected by these austerity measures.

== Critics ==
The budget has left financial analysts wondering how government will "eliminate deficits in one part of the budget (recurrent), but leave the other (development) unbalanced and still call the whole plan deficit-free". Opposition parties argue that the budget will hurt ordinary Malawians and stifle the private sector since it also imposes tax increases on ordinary goods.

== Features ==
- Finance all public recurrent expenditure using its own domestic resources without any recourse to either domestic or foreign borrowing or cuts in public service delivery.
- Projects will be mobilized unless resources backing up those expenditures have been received.
- Import duty on photocopier machines, cigars and other tobacco substitutes went up by more than 100%.
- limits on goods allowed from export processing zones (EPZs).
- Allocation to support the education sector received the bulk of the budget followed by the agriculture and food security sector.
