= Richard Msowoya =

Malawian politician (born 1962)

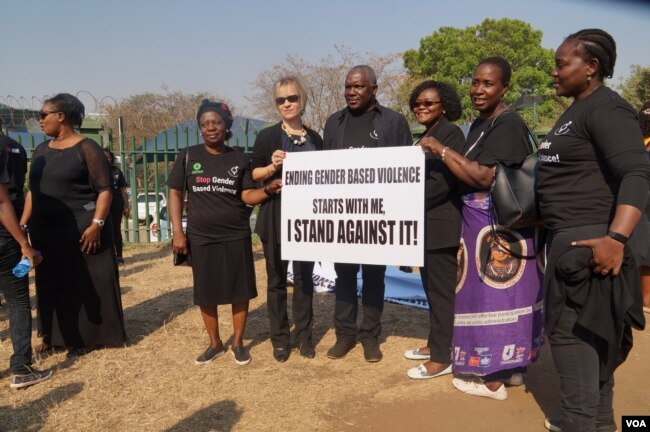
- in 2017 at protest about gender violence

7th Speaker of the National Assembly
- In office 16 June 2014 – 19 June 2019
- Preceded by: Chimunthu Banda
- Succeeded by: Catherine Gotani Hara

Member of the National Assembly
- In office 2014–2019
- Preceded by: Khwauli Msiska
- Succeeded by: Kenneth Ndovie
- Constituency: Karonga Nyungwe

Personal details
- Born: 28 August 1962 (age 63)
- Party: Malawi Congress (before 2018); United Transformation Movement (since 2018)

Richard Msowoya (born 28 August 1962) is a Malawian politician who served as the 7th Speaker of the National Assembly and in the assembly for the Karonga Nyungwe constituency from 2014 to 2019. He was a member of the Malawi Congress Party and United Transformation Movement. He was Lazarus Chakwera's vice presidential running mate in the 2014 election

== Early life and education ==
Richard Msowoya was born on 28 August 1962. He graduated with a master's degree in supply chain management.

== Career ==
Msowoya served as Deputy Minister of Education, Minister of State, and Minister of Transport. Msowoya became vice president of the Malawi Congress Party (MCP).

Msowoya was Lazarus Chakwera's vice presidential running mate in the 2014 election. During the campaign he participated in the first televised vice presidential debate in Malawi's history.

In the 2009 election Msowoya ran in the Karonga Nyungwe constituency as an independent candidate and lost to Khwauli Msiska. He defeated Msiska in the 2014 election as the nominee of the MCP.

Msowoya defeated Francis Kasaila, a member of the Democratic Progressive Party (DPP), to become the 7th Speaker by a vote of 101 to 89 on 16 June 2014.

Msowoya left the MCP and joined the United Transformation Movement (UTM) on 20 July 2018. He declined to seek reelection in the Karonga Nyungwe constituency in 2019, and instead supported his daughter Luwani Msowoya. Kenneth Ndovie defeated her in the election.

== Personal life ==
A cyclist was hit and killed by Msowoya in Chisemphere in 2015, but no charges were filed against him.

== Works cited ==
=== News ===
- "Malawi: Msowoya Cleared of Any Crime". malawi24. 14 July 2015. Archived from the original on 10 July 2025 – via allAfrica.
- "Speaker Msowoya confirms switch to Movement". The Nation. 20 July 2018. Archived from the original on 10 July 2025.
- Gwede, Wanga (16 June 2014). "MCP's Msowoya elected Speaker of Malawi Parliament". Nyasa Times. Archived from the original on 4 March 2016.
- Masina, Lameck (9 March 2014). "Malawi Holds First Ever Debate for Presidential Running Mates". Voice of America. Archived from the original on 10 July 2025.
- Moyo, Judith (8 October 2018). "Msowoya will not contest in 2019: Speaker's daughter to run on UTM's ticket in Karonga Nyungwe". Nyasa Times. Archived from the original on 10 July 2025.

=== Web ===
- "2009 Election Results" (PDF). Malawi Electoral Commission. Archived from the original (PDF) on 19 December 2016.
- "2014 Election Results" (PDF). Malawi Electoral Commission. Archived from the original (PDF) on 27 June 2014.
- "Karonga Nyungwe Parliamentary Constituency Results". Malawi Electoral Commission. Archived from the original on 10 July 2025.
- "Parliament elects Speaker". National Assembly. 16 June 2014. Archived from the original on 4 March 2016.
- "Richard Msowoya". Africa Confidential. Archived from the original on 10 July 2025.
