= Chipani cha Pfuko =

Defunct political party in Malawi

Chipani cha Pfuko (CCP) was a political party in Malawi led by Davis Katsonga.

== History ==
The party was established in 2012. In the 2014 general elections it put forward Katsonga as its presidential candidate. He finished last in a field of 12 candidates, with 0.1% of the vote. The party also won one seat in the National Assembly. The party disbanded when Katsonga joined the Democratic Progressive Party in July 2014.
