= Simplex Chithyola Banda =

Malawian politician and educator

Minister of Finance & Economic Affairs
- In office 7 October 2023 – 15 September 2025
- President: Lazarus Chakwera
- Preceded by: Sosten Gwengwe
- Succeeded by: Joseph Mwanamveka

Personal details
- Born: Simplex Chithyola Banda; 1969 (age 56–57) Kasungu, Malawi
- Party: Malawi Congress Party
- Education: University of Bedfordshire
- Occupation: Educator; Activist; politician

Simplex Chithyola Banda is a Malawian politician and educator who served as the Minister of Finance and Economic Affairs (Malawi) between 2023 and 2025. He was a Member of Parliament for Kasungu South Constituency from Malawi Congress Party.

== Life ==
Banda was born in 1969 in Kasungu, Malawi. He attended Kasungu Secondary School. He has a Master's Degree in Public Policy and Administration. He was appointed by President Lazarus Chakwera as the new Minister of Finance replacing Sosten Gwengwe. He announced what he called a 4F plan based around fuel, forex, food and fertiliser. The plan attracted mixed comment. In 2023 he announced government support for businesses trading across the country's borders.

He served until the election of 2025.

In April 2026 he handed himself in for questioning after hearing that the police were investigating accusations of money laundering and abuse of office.
