= Human Rights Consultative Committee =

The Human Rights Consultative Committee is a civil rights organization in Malawi. They are committed to the promotion and protection of human rights for the Malawi. Their activities include advocacy, monitoring, information sharing, capacity building and resource mobilization for member institutions, government and key stakeholders. The organization has been involved in human rights issues in Malawi since July 1995. The committee consists of a network were Church Institutions, Human Rights NGOs and the Law Society of Malawi work together in areas of human rights, advocacy and information sharing. HRCC is thus works as a network of local Civil Society Organizations (CSOs) and Non-Government Organizations (NGOs) that have interest in protecting people’s rights, promoting the human rights agenda, and safeguarding governance and the rule of law.

== Arson attack ==
The center was a target of an arson attack in March 2011.

== July 20th protests ==
HRCC was one of the organizations that was in the forefront of organizing the nationwide the July 20th Protests in Malawi as well as the September 21, 2011 nationwide strike. Leaders of the protests from HRCC include director, Undule Mwakasungula and acting national coordinator Rev. MacDonald Sembereka. Their homes were both targets of arson in 2011 because of their work in human rights.
