= John Tembo =

Malawian politician (1932–2023)

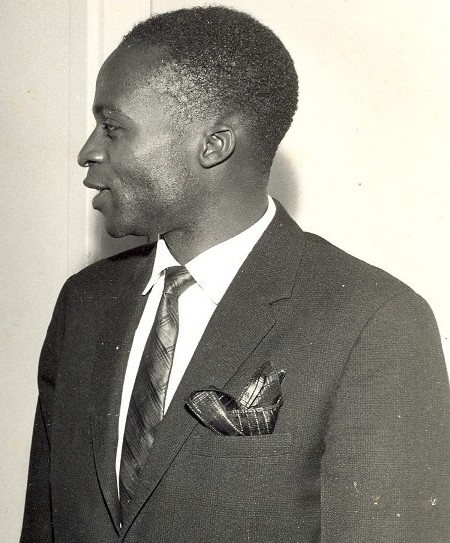
- Tembo circa 1965

President of the Malawi Congress Party
- In office c. 2003 – 11 August 2013
- Succeeded by: Lazarus Chakwera

Minister of Finance of Malawi
- In office c. 1964 – c. 1969
- Preceded by: Henry Phillips
- Succeeded by: Aleke Banda

Governor of the Reserve Bank of Malawi
- Preceded by: D. E. Thomson
- Succeeded by: Chakakala Chaziya

Personal details
- Born: 14 September 1932 Dedza District, Central Region, Nyasaland (now Malawi)
- Died: 27 September 2023 (aged 91) Lilongwe, Malawi
- Party: Malawi Congress Party (c. 1971 – 11 September 2013)
- Spouse: Ruth Tembo
- Children: Chimwemwe Dudu, John Tembo Jr, Thabo Themba, Annabel Mtalimanja and Dalitso
- Profession: Teacher

John Zenus Ungapake Tembo (14 September 1932 – 27 September 2023) was a Malawian politician who served for years as President of the Malawi Congress Party (MCP). Tembo comes from the Dedza District in central Malawi, and he was a teacher by profession. Beginning in the 1960s he was an important politician in Malawi, and he was a key figure in the regime of Hastings Banda (1964–1994). He has been variously described as "physically slight, ascetic, fastidious" and "cunning". He was replaced as President of the MCP in August 2013.

== Early career ==
Tembo was born in Dedza District, Central Region on 14 September 1932. His father, Zenus Ungapake Tembo, was a minister of the Church of Central African Presbyterian (CCAP). He attended several primary schools before graduating to Blantyre Secondary School. He later went to study at the University of Roma (also known as Pius XII College) in Lesotho, graduating in 1958 with a Bachelor of Arts in political philosophy. He had a brief stint as a teacher at Dedza Secondary School and later taught for two years at Robert Blake Secondary School in the central region district of Dowa in 1958.

In 1960, two years after Dr. Banda's arrival in the country from Ghana to lead the independence struggle from British colonial rule, Tembo was invited to take up a parliamentary seat in Dedza South constituency.

Tembo was elected to the legislative assembly of Nyasaland in 1961, three years before the country gained its independence and became the Republic of Malawi. He was the second Minister of Finance in Malawi after independence, succeeding Henry Phillips (later Sir Henry Phillips) in a post for which the intended candidate had been Dunduzu Chisiza (Chisiza died in 1962 in a car crash). John Tembo was the only cabinet member not to resign in the notorious Cabinet Crisis of 1964, after which most of the President's closest lieutenants, their opposition to his policies thwarted, fled the country. (Chinua Achebe in A Man of the People admits having used a real situation gleaned from the Hansards of a certain African country to portray his main character 'Chief Nanga', the heckler in parliament who hounded out the 'offensive minister' who had just resigned.)

== Relationship with Banda ==
Tembo was prone to taking some unilateral decisions, e.g. the '1974 Youth Week Inauguration' venue saga when Tembo decided, without Banda's permission, to stage the event in Lilongwe to coincide with the 'New Capital City' inauguration gala Banda had yet to sanction. Banda found this offensive and in the presence of Gwanda Chakuamba dressed down Tembo before instructing Chakuamba to rearrange, at a very high cost to the government, the Youth Week inauguration back in Blantyre. Despite Cecilia Kadzamira's intervention, Banda proceeded to remove John Tembo from the National Celebrations Council and placed him into a minor post of Reserve Bank Governor and the ceremonial Chairman of the University Council. The Banda-Tembo relationship soured and it became an uphill struggle, with Cecilia's active support, for Tembo to regain his position of prominence. His role as the Chichewa interpreter to Banda was engineered so that John Tembo stayed in Banda's presence. Cecilia engineered the removal as interpreter and subsequent demise in disgrace of the eloquent Chichewa speaking John Msonthi; whereupon on Msonthi's burial day a gun battle ensued between the Msonthi and Tembo/ Kadzamira clans. And when John Tembo suggested, during one of Dr. Banda's speech on ubiquitous and 'invisible enemies', that ministers and those around the President should carry automatic weapons to 'defend' Dr. Banda, John Tembo was swiftly rapped on the wrist and a temporary replacement interpreter was arranged.

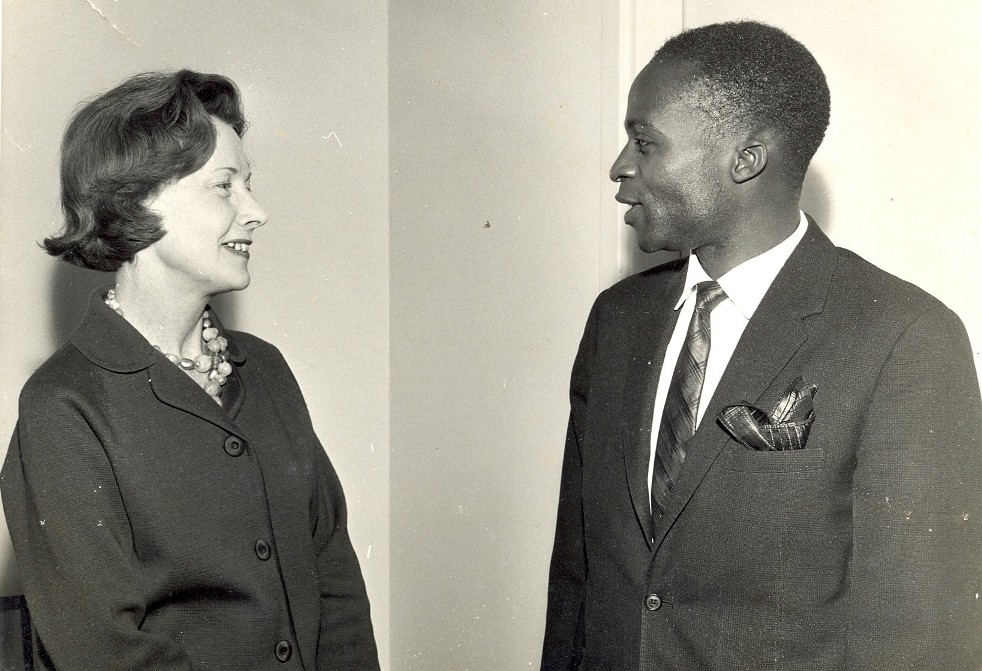
Tembo meeting Barbara Castle, British Minister for Overseas Development, circa 1965

When Malawi became a republic in 1966 after attaining independence in 1964, Tembo was appointed as Minister of Finance. In 1971, at the Dowa MCP Convention, Tembo was the 'primary' sponsor (while another two seconded) for Banda becoming the 'Life President' of Malawi. Banda rewarded him with postgraduate studies in central banking in Britain and France. Later he was to use the knowledge as Governor of the Reserve Bank of Malawi, a post he held for 13 years.

As confidante to the President, Tembo was used as Dr. Banda's Machiavellian bludgeon during the later part of Dr. Banda's 30-year tyrannical rule. Tembo came to personify the negatives that Dr. Banda did. The greater majority in Malawi came to hate John Tembo for the excesses that ideally should have been aimed at Dr. Banda. While most people became resigned to the 'life presidency' issue (wait until the old man departs), a determination, especially after the Mwanza Assassination, emerged that Tembo would 'never rule' Malawi. Yet, in a move demonstrating Banda embraced 'democracy' much earlier than portrayed, Banda released John Tembo from his duties as Governor of the Reserve Bank and sent him on a two-year sabbatical to the US Congress to study the workings of democracy. When John Tembo returned in 1989, Banda appointed him as Minister without Portfolio much to the furore and greater agitation for multiparty democracy.

With Banda's health failing Cecilia Tamanda Kadzamira turned more to Tembo to do her low-key political bidding. In turn, John Tembo unleashed onto Malawians what Banda was to later call the 'parallel MCP'. Sections of the Secret Service, Malawi Young Pioneers and other agencies, loyal to John Tembo, systematically incarcerated and/or summarily killed any vocal opposition to his rise to power while the educated, especially those without links to John Tembo's 'Dedza-Ntakataka Connection' were dispatched into exile. Yet, the Machiavelli Dr. Banda did not fully relinquish power. Given a choice between Tembo and Gwanda Chakuamba, Banda anointed Chakuamba as his running mate in Malawi's first multiparty elections, held on 17 May 1994.

In January 1995, some months after Banda lost the election to Bakili Muluzi of the United Democratic Front (UDF), Tembo and "Mama" were put on trial for the murder of the four prominent Malawi politicians in 1983 (the so-called Mwanza trial). While there was little doubt that the four politicians had met their violent end (also allegedly in a "car crash") at the hands of state security forces, there was no direct evidence linking the accused to the murders and they were acquitted. After Banda's death in 1997, Tembo attempted to take over the presidency of the Malawi Congress Party from Chakuamba and defied a high court injunction preventing him from holding a convention to do so. Because the high court ruled him in contempt, he was expelled from the legislative assembly, although he successfully challenged the expulsion. Using the parallel MCP mechanisms, John Tembo finally wrested control of the MCP from Gwanda Chakuamba.

== 2004 election ==
As the candidate of the MCP, Tembo officially placed second, with 27% of the vote, in the presidential election held on 20 May 2004, behind the winner, UDF candidate Bingu wa Mutharika, and ahead of Chakuamba, who ran as the candidate of the Mgwirizano Coalition.

On 28 August 2007, Tembo rejected an appeal from Chakuamba for Tembo to become the running mate of Muluzi, the UDF's candidate, in the 2009 election. Tembo said that the MCP would have its own campaign and would not participate in a coalition.

== 2009 presidential election ==
On 1 November 2008, Tembo was unanimously elected as the MCP's 2009 presidential candidate at the MCP National Convention held at the Natural Resources College in Lilongwe. Tembo was to face President Mutharika, who was running for a second term as the candidate of the newly formed Democratic Progressive Party (DPP).

Tembo was considered the main opposition candidate, and the MCP formed an electoral alliance with Muluzi and the UDF prior to the election; the old foes came together with the goal of defeating Mutharika, their mutual enemy. Tembo's vice-presidential candidate was Brown Mpinganjira of the UDF. Observing that the DPP had never participated in an election (it was founded in 2005), Tembo argued that he and the MCP had the experience to govern the country properly: "I belong to the past, I belong to the present and I also belong to the future."

Observers expected a close election between the two strongest candidates, Mutharika and Tembo. While Tembo enjoyed the united backing of the country's two most established and powerful parties—the MCP and the UDF—he faced an incumbent president who had presided over strong economic growth of 8%, and the outcome was considered uncertain.

Ultimately, Mutharika won an overwhelming victory in the election, according to official results, and Tembo alleged fraud. Afterwards, some in the MCP called for the party to recognize Mutharika's victory and for Tembo to resign as MCP President. Tembo refused and vowed to legally challenge the results. He was re-elected as the MP for Dedza South in the concurrent parliamentary election. The MCP's strength in parliament was seriously reduced in the election, as it retained only 25 MPs, while Mutharika's DPP secured a large majority of seats; nevertheless, the MCP remained the second largest party in the National Assembly. When Tembo was sworn in again as an MP on 2 June 2009, he vowed that he would continue as Leader of the Opposition during the 2009–2014 parliamentary term, despite apparently substantial dissent within the MCP.

Parliament initially refused to recognize Tembo as Leader of the Opposition, but in late August 2009 the High Court ordered it to do so on an interim basis.

As MCP President, Tembo opposed the government's move to change the national flag in mid-2010, arguing that the government was "playing with serious matters of the state and the constitution put up by our forefathers."

At a party convention held in August 2013, delegates overwhelmingly opposed, through a voice vote, changing the MCP's constitution to allow Tembo to stand for a third term as MCP President. Lazarus Chakwera was then elected to succeed Tembo on 10 August 2013. Handing over the party leadership to Chakwera on 11 August, Tembo urged party members to unite behind his successor: "He is the only hope MCP and Malawi has to restore the development we have been dreaming about". Saying that he intended to retire from politics, Tembo reflected on his age: "Yes, I am old. Most of my friends died. But everyone's life is in God's hands." Later in the month, Tembo said that he intended to spend his retirement "reading, writing, and farming", although for the time being he continued to serve as an MP and as Leader of the Opposition. He denied that the MCP delegates had been opposing him when they refused to change the party constitution, saying that he had previously expressed his wish to retire and that the delegates had therefore simply honored his wishes.

After a parliamentary career dating back more than 50 years, Tembo confirmed on 22 September 2013 that he would not stand for re-election as the MP for Dezda South in the 2014 parliamentary election.

== Personal life and death ==
Tembo was married to Ruth Tembo, who predeceased him. He is the father of Chimwemwe Dudu, John Jr, Thabo Themba, Dalitso and Annabel Mtalimanja.

John Tembo died of pneumonia on 27 September 2023, at the age of 91.
