= Henry Phillips (colonial administrator) =

British colonial administrator

Sir Henry Ellis Isidore Phillips CMG MBE was a British army officer, a Far East prisoner of war and a colonial administrator in Nyasaland, later Malawi.

== Life ==
Henry Phillips was born on 30 August 1914. He attended The Haberdashers' Aske's Boys' School and graduated as Bachelor of Arts from University College London, in 1936, receiving his MA subsequently in 1939. His essay 'The Last Years of the Court of Star Chamber, 1630-41', won him the Alexander Prize of the Royal Historical Society in 1938.

Phillips received a commission in the Bedfordshire and Hertfordshire Regiment early in the Second World War and was sent to Singapore with the 5th battalion of his regiment, a part of the 18th Infantry Division, arriving shortly before Singapore fell to the Japanese on 15 February 1942. From December of that year until April 1944, he worked as an intelligence officer on the Thailand-Burma Railway, in the jungle prison camp at Tarsao, collecting and disseminating information from the outside world, from local newspapers and hidden radios, in order to boost the morale of his fellow prisoners. In February 1945 he was interrogated by the Kempeitai (Japanese Military Police) and sentenced to two years’ imprisonment. He arrived at Singapore’s Outram Road Jail, known as “The Belsen of the East”, in July 1945 but was released after only a month. For his work during this time in Burma and Singapore he was awarded the MBE in 1946.

Shortly after the end of the war he left England for Nyasaland (now Malawi) in Central Africa where he served as an assistant district commissioner in the northern area of Karonga on Lake Nyasa. He moved to Salisbury (now Harare) in Southern Rhodesia (now Zimbabwe) in 1953, serving in the Treasury of the Federation of Rhodesia and Nyasaland which was formed in that year.

He returned to Nyasaland in 1957 as Financial Secretary. In 1960 he was appointed CMG. As the senior official responsible for finance, he expected to hand over the reins on independence to Dunduzu Chisiza, a prominent young member of the group, headed by Hastings Kamuzu Banda, which was to govern after Nyasaland achieved independence. Chisiza, however, was killed in a car crash in September 1962, and so Phillips was asked by Banda to occupy the post of Minister of Finance until another candidate could be schooled for this position. (In the event, his successor was John Tembo). He left Nyasaland, now Malawi, in 1964, shortly after the country finally achieved its independence, and was knighted.

He returned to England and in 1966 he was appointed CEO of the Standard Bank Development Corporation. He died on 21 December 2004, at the age of 90.

== Sources ==
- From Obscurity to Bright Dawn: How Nyasaland Became Malawi — An Insider’s Account, by Sir Henry Phillips. London: 1998. Radcliffe Press.
- Obituary, The Times (of London), 18 February 2005
