= Felix Mlusu =

Malawian financial services executive (born 1951)

The Honorable Felix Mlusu
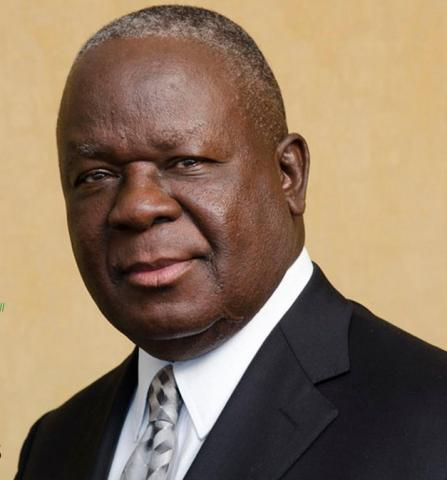

Minister of Finance of Malawi
- In office 29 June 2020 – 24 January 2022
- President: Lazarus Chakwera
- Preceded by: Joseph Mwanamvekha
- Succeeded by: Sosten Gwengwe

Personal details
- Born: Felix Lafiel Mlusu; 23 March 1951 (age 75) Lilongwe, Malawi
- Party: Malawi Congress Party
- Spouse: Sabbina Mlusu (m. 1978)
- Children: 4
- Education: Polytechnic College, University of Malawi (diploma in business studies)
- Profession: corporate executive

Felix Mlusu (born 23 March 1951) is a Malawian corporate executive who served as the 22nd Minister of Finance in the Government of the Republic of Malawi from 2020 to 2022. Prior to his role in the Treasury he was Managing Director and Group Chief Executive Officer of NICO Holdings from 1994 until his retirement on 31 December 2016.

== Personal life ==
Mlusu was born on 23 March 1951 in Lilongwe, Nyasaland, now Malawi. He is married to Sabbina Mlusu, together they have four children and grandchildren and are members of St Michael and All Angels Church of the Church of Central Africa Presbyterian - Blantyre Synod.

Mlusu is an avid golfer who enjoys participating in local tournaments.

== Education ==
Mlusu went to Chitukula Primary School and Likuni Boys Secondary School where he completed his studies and was selected to attend the University of Malawi Polytechnic College in Blantyre where he graduated with a Diploma in Business Studies in 1975.

Mlusu further studied with the Chartered Insurance Institute of London and was awarded the Associate Diploma qualification in 1985. He was awarded the full Chartered Insurer (UK) qualification in 1995 and was invited to join the Society of Fellows of the Chartered Insurance Institute of London in 2000. Mlusu is also a Member of the Institute of Directors in Southern Africa.

Mlusu has attended management and technical training at various institutions including the Malawi Polytechnic, Wits Business School (Johannesburg, South Africa), Guardian Royal Exchange (London, United Kingdom), Munich Reinsurance Company (Munich, Germany), General Insurance Organisation (Sydney, Australia), College Of Insurance (Bombay, India) and Harvard Business School (Boston, United States).

== NICO Holdings Plc ==
Mlusu joined National Insurance Company Limited in 1975 as a management trainee and rose through the ranks to the position of Chief Executive Officer in 1994, the first Malawian to lead the company, previous chief executives were expatriates. Mlusu then went on to become Managing Director and Group Chief Executive Officer of the restructured company NICO Holdings a position which he held from 1996 until his retirement on 31 December 2016.

It was during Mlusu's tenure that NICO Holdings Limited (then the National Insurance Company Limited) became the first company to be listed on the Malawi Stock Exchange and also when the company was successfully restructured from a composite insurance company to a financial services conglomerate, NICO Holdings Public Limited Company. He led NICO Holdings to undertake the first successful foreign investment for a Malawian company making NICO Holdings a multinational holding company.

Mlusu has served on numerous boards in various sectors of the economy in the following capacities:

- Managing Director of NICO Holdings
- Chairman of NBS Bank Public Limited Company
- Chairman of Blantyre Hotels Public Limited Company- Ryalls Hotel by Marriott
- Chairman of British American Tobacco – Malawi
- Chairman of Chibuku Products Limited – Malawi (SABMiller Subsidiary)

Mlusu has also been instrumental in various capacities in other institutions such as:

- Member of the Malawi Stock Exchange Committee - Charged with setting up the Malawi Stock Exchange.
- Executive committee member of the African Insurance Organization (Headquartered in Cameroon)
- Chairman of the Insurance Association of Malawi
- Chairman of the COMESA Yellow Card Scheme, Council of Bureaux (Headquartered in Zambia)
- Chairman of IMPACT - a Private Sector Think-Tank advising the Government of Malawi

Mlusu has also served in several other capacities other than the above-mentioned.

== Minister of Finance ==
Mlusu was appointed Minister of Finance of the Republic of Malawi by President Lazarus Chakwera on 29 June 2020.

As Minister of Finance, Hon. Mlusu was member of the following institutions:

- Member of the Cabinet
- Ex-Officio Member of the National Assembly
- AfDB, Ex-Officio Member of the Board of Governors,
- World Bank Group, Ex-Officio Member of the Board of Governors
- International Monetary Fund, Ex-Officio Member of the Board of Governors
- Chairman of the Intergovernmental Committee of Senior Officials and Experts (ICSOE), 27th session (2021)

== Recognition ==
- Mlusu was conferred a Chewa Champions Award in Preserving Culture, National Service and Patriotism, Displaying Unquestionable Character and promoting peace by the Chewa Heritage Foundation.
- Mlusu was named Customer Focused Executive of the Year 2015 and presented with an Award of Service Excellence by the Chartered Institution of Customer Management (Malawi).
- Mlusu was recognized and honored by Mzuzu University (a Malawi Government University) by being awarded an Honorary Doctorate Degree in Business Leadership (Honors Causa) in March 2017.
- Mlusu led and implemented a successful leadership succession plan for NICO Holdings Plc conglomerate between 2015 and 2016.
