= Tembo language (disambiguation) =

Tembo may refer to:

- Chitembo a.k.a. Kitembo, spoken in the DRC.
- Litembo a.k.a. Motembo, a dialect of Tembo-Kunda, also spoken in the DRC.
- Tambo, a dialect of Nyamwanga, spoken in Zambia.
