= Minister of Finance and Economic Affairs (Malawi) =

Cabinet position in the government of Malawi

The Minister of Finance and Economic Affairs is a minister in the Cabinet of Malawi who is responsible for the financial management of government affairs, including preparing the national budget, and developing economic policy. The current minister is Joseph Mwanamveka.

== Objectives ==
Functions of the Minister of Finance and Economic Affairs

- coordinating and preparing annual budget
- preparing and reviewing the National Economic Programme
- monitoring the financial performance of public enterprises
- processing public finance management policy studies
- giving advice to the Minister of Finance and the Secretary to the Treasury on short to medium term economic matters
- assessing macroeconomic performance relating to fiscal and monetary policies
- coordinating policies in the financial sector including such areas as banks, etc.

== Ministers responsible for finance ==
=== Colonial era ===
- Henry Phillips, 1963–1964

=== Post-colonial era ===
- John Tembo, 1964–1969
- Aleke Banda, 1969–1972
- Dick Matenje, 1972–1978
- Edward Bwanali, 1978–1980
- Louis Chimango, 1980–1981
- Chakakala Chaziya, 1981–1984
- Edward Bwanali, 1984–1986
- Stephen Chimwemwe Hara, 1986
- Dalton Katopola, 1986–1987
- Louis Chimango, 1987–1994
- Aleke Banda, 1994–1997
- Cassim Chilumpha, 1997–2000
- Mathews Chikaonda, 2000–2002
- Friday Jumbe, 2002–2004
- Goodall Gondwe, 2004–2009
- Ken Kandodo, 2009–2011
- Ken Lipenga, 2011–2013
- Maxwell Mkwezalamba, 2013–2014
- Goodall Gondwe, 2014–2019
- Joseph Mwanamvekha, 2019–2020
- Felix Mlusu, 2020–2022
- Sosten Gwengwe, 2022–2023
- Simplex Chithyola Banda, 2023–2025
- Joseph Mwanamveka, 2025–

== See also ==
- Economy of Malawi
