= Centre for Human Rights and Rehabilitation =

Malawian human rights non-governmental organization

- Abbreviation: CHRR
- Formation: February 1995
- Purpose: Promote equity and equality
- Headquarters: Malawi
- Website: website

The Centre for Human Rights and Rehabilitation, or CHRR, is a human rights non-governmental organisation in Malawi. It was founded in February 1995 as a non-profit, apolitical, voluntary organization registered under the Trustees Incorporation Act of 1962. The organization was founded by former students exiles who returned home to the promises of a new democracy in 1994.

The organization is authorized to provide its services anywhere in Malawi. Its registration under Incorporation Act 1962 provides the basis that defines the organization's mandate and scope of work. Currently programmes are carried out in all the three regions namely Southern, Central and Northern Regions.

The organization supports and promotes a vibrant Malawian culture which embraces values of democracy and human rights. CHRR mission is to contribute towards the protection, promotion and consolidation of good governance by empowering rural and urban communities in Malawi to increase awareness of and exercise their rights through research, education, advocacy and networking in order to realize human development.

CHRR seeks to contribute towards the realization of this mission through a number of programmes carried out through two core programmes namely: Community Mobilization and Empowerment and Human Rights Monitoring and Training.

== History ==
The following information is from CHRR director Undule Mwakasungura unless otherwise indicated.

The Flag of Malawi: The sun represents rising hope, black the people of the country, the red people who died for liberation and green represents nature.

The Centre for Human Rights and Rehabilitation (CHRR) was founded in 1994. The group was founded by exiled students who left the country in the early 70s and 80s. They resumed life in other countries as business men and various professions. They returned in 1994 upon the introduction of multi party elections. The group decided to use their experience and expertise to promote the protection of human rights. The only remaining member of the founding group is current executive director Undule Mwakasungura.

== Organization Overview ==
=== Mission statement ===
Contribute towards the protection, promotion and consolidation of good governance by empowering rural and urban communities in Malawi to increase awareness of and exercise their rights through research, education, advocacy and networking in order to realize human development.

=== Objectives ===
- Raising awareness and understanding of human rights, democracy, and good governance among Malawians
- Enhancing community awareness of safety issues
- Acquiring information that is of national importance
- Providing mediation to marginalized groups in Malawi
- Lobbying for the repeal of laws that infringe on the rights of men, women, and children of Malawi
- Networking with other organizations with similar objectives on a national, regional, and international level

=== Programs ===
- Community Mobilization and Empowerment
- Human Rights Monitoring and Training

=== Major Challenges CHRR faces ===
1. Sustainability in terms of financial support
2. Duplication and Competition amongst local and international organizations
3. Negative government attitude towards NGOs
4. Staff turnover due to competition between NGOs
5. Widespread illiteracy and ignorance among the population has contributed to the lack of appreciation and understanding of human rights and democracy

== Background on Malawi ==
The following information comes from the CIA world fact book.
Capital: Lilongwe
Population: 13,603,181 (2007 est.)
GDP per capita: $800 (2007 est.)
Type of Government: Multiparty democracy
History of current leader: Malawi, established in 1891, gained its independence from Britain in 1964. It held its first multi party election in 1994, after three decades of rule under President Hastings Kamuzu. President Bingu wa Mutharika, who was elected in May 2004, currently holds the position. He formed his own party called the Democratic Progressive Party (DPP).

Malawi has seen some economic improvement, but because of a political deadlock in the legislature, Mutharika has been unable to pass significant legislation. This has stalled the fight against corruption.

Legal System: based on English common law, judicial review of legislative acts in the Supreme Court of appeal.

=== Challenges Malawi is facing ===
(following information from CHRR)

1. Lack of constitutionalism
2. Lack of Respect for court rulings
3. Lack of Political Parties (many groups are under represented. Women are not given leadership positions)
4. Lack of Political Tolerance
5. HIV and Aids

== CHRR Achievements ==
CHRR has contributed to the promotion of human rights through programs like Civil Education: Bring awareness in communities through radio programs, community debates, training, and voter education. Research: CHRR has carried out research projects on issues related to governance, human rights, and other issues pertaining to governance and human rights. This research has been used as a tool for awareness and lobbying. Advocacy and Networking: CHRR has been in the forefront of advocacy for democratic governance. They have collaborated with organizations with similar interests.

Some of the networks they are a part of include:

- CONGOMA
- HRCC
- Gender Support Network
- MEJN
- MESN
- Malawi Social Forum
- Amnesty International

Some of their partners include:

- One World Africa
  - Fahamu Education Training
- Centre For Children Affairs
- Civil Liberties Committee
- Christian Agency for Responsible Democracy and Unity
  - Coalition on Violence Against Women
  - Citizens for Justice
- Foundation for Community Support Service

=== Specific examples of work ===
The following table gives specific case examples of work that CHRR has been involved in.

Country	Issue	Action
Zimbabwe	Political instability in the country (2006)	Took a public stance, calling the Southern; African Development Community to take action in Zimbabwe
Malawi	Problems that have arisen from the overpopulation of Zimbabwean refugees. (2007)	Called public officials to offer more programs to deal with economic issues.
Malawi	Lucius Kamanga shot by police officer who was in the car of a member of Parliament (5/04) Felix Chikoti was arrested and beat while in custody, later he was found strangled to death (5/04); Kennedy Chirombo was shot by police on his way to buy paraffin (5/04)	Offered the families a lawyer for litigation, and won settlements from the government for each of these families.
Malawi	World Bank national report: Governance and Corruption Baseline Survey Team, which is in place to assess the amount of corruption in Malawi and design methods of disseminating information. (5/2005)	B. Kondowe Participated in this committee on behalf of CHRR
Malawi	Controversy over Uranium mining project: Environmental and safety studies were done by company, rather than the government. Now there are accusations that the company lied about the results of these tests. (11/2006)	CHRR presented information in a press briefing in Lilongwe. Gave information on how mining could be detrimental.
