= Webster Muzaza =

Zambian footballer (born 1997)

Personal information
- Date of birth: 21 August 1997 (age 29)
- Place of birth: Mufulira, Zambia
- Position: Midfielder

Team information
- Current team: Forest Rangers

Senior career*
Years	Team	Apps	(Gls)
2019–	Forest Rangers		

International career^{‡}
2019–	Zambia	3	(0)
- * Club domestic league appearances and goals ‡ National team caps and goals as of 20 July 2020

Webster Muzaza (born 21 August 1997) is a Zambian footballer who plays as a midfielder for Forest Rangers F.C. and the Zambia national football team.

== Career ==
=== International ===
Muzaza was included in the Zambia squad for the 2019 COSAFA Cup. He made his senior international debut at that tournament, playing the entirety of Zambia's quarter-final penalty victory over Malawi. Muzaza appeared as a substitute in the next match, against Zimbabwe, but played no part in the final.

== Career statistics ==
=== International ===
As of matches played 12 March 2020.

National team	Year	Apps	Goals
Zambia	2019	2	0
Zambia	2020	1	0
Total		3	0

== Honors ==
=== International ===
Zambia

- COSAFA Cup Champion: 2019
