= Rafiq Hajat =

Malawian activist (1955–2021)

- Born: Blantyre
- Died: 13 September 2021
- Citizenship: Malawi
- Education: B.A. in political science St. Xavier's College, Mumbai
- Occupation: Director (Institute for Policy Interaction)

Rafiq Hajat (14 September 1955 – 13 September 2021) was a prominent Malawian civil rights activist. He was born in Blantyre. He was the director for the Institute for Policy Interaction (IPI) in Malawi.

He received a B.A. in political science at Saint Xavier College in Mumbai, India in 1975.

== Career ==
Vice president of the country's chamber of commerce and industry, chairman of DEMAT, the Development of Malawian Traders' Trust, and also founding director of the Institute for Policy Interaction (IPI). He has worked at the Malawi Chamber of Commerce and Industry and has been a board member with Small Enterprise Development Organisation of Malawi and the Development of Malawi Traders Trust.

== Political career ==
Hajat was a member of the executive in the United Democratic Front.

== Activism ==
Hajat was the founding director of the Institute for Policy Interaction (IPI) and was the founder of Transparency International - Malawi Chapter. Hajat and Malawi Democratic Party (MDP) president Kamlepo Kalua formed a Forum for the Defence of Democracy a pressure group on governance concerns under the Mutharika administration.

Hajat was one of the main civil society organizers of the 20 July Ultimatum and 20 July nationwide economic protests. This forced him to go into hiding for a few days, but later he continued to organize the subsequent protests.

On 2 September 2011, the offices of the IPI were burned whilst Hajat was traveling to Lilongwe.

== Death ==
Hajat died on the early morning of 13 September 2021 while being airlifted to South Africa after having a heart attack. He was buried later that day at Westpark Cemetery in Johannesburg.

== Accolades ==
- 2012, Hajat was a finalist for the Front Line Award for Human Rights Defenders at Risk, which ultimately went to Syrian blogger Razan Ghazzawi.
