= Hellen Singh =

Malawian philanthropist and businessperson

Helen Singh
- in 2016
- Born: c.1944 Ntcheu District
- Died: 25 April, 2017; Blantyre
- Known for: Presidential candidate
- Political party: United Independence Party in Malawi
- Spouse: Shamsher Singh (died 2001)
- Children: 3

Helen Singh or Abusa Helen Singh (c.1944 – 25 April, 2017) was a Malawian philanthropist and businessperson who became the President of the United Independence Party in Malawi. She was an unsuccessful candidate in the 2014 Presidential election.

== Life ==
Singh was born in Ntcheu District in about 1944. She became a businessperson who owned a car hire company. She founded the Worship Centre in Blantyre , a non denominational church, where anyone could worship. Singh stood as an independent candidate in the 2009 election in the Ntcheu Bwanje Constituency for the second unsuccessful time. She was known for caring for children and in particular orphans.

Her husband died in 2001 after more than twenty years of marriage.

In 2013 she formed and became the President of the United Independence Party and she was the third woman to be a candidate for President of Malawi along with Joyce Banda. Loveness Gondwe had also ran unsuccessfully.

Singh's running mate was Chrissy Tembo who was from northern Malawi.

Singh died in Blantyre in 2017 after a long battle with bowel cancer.
