= John Tembo Jr =

Malawian diplomat

John Tembo Jr is a Malawian diplomat. He was the Deputy High Commissioner from Malawi to the U.K. He worked at the foreign service in Japan, Belgium and England.

== Career ==
He is a graduate of the University of Malawi. He served as the trade attache in the Malawi embassy to Japan. He was the deputy ambassador to England, working as the deputy to High Commissioner Benard Sande. They have been enlisted to restore relations with England after diplomatic ties between England and Malawi were strained as a result of a wikileaks document.

== Politics ==
=== Car robbery ===
He was arrested on charges of an alleged role in a conspiracy to murder, and for attempted murder together with John Tembo, and Cecilia Kadzamira in September 1995 when John Junior's car was involved in an attempted robbery. The car had been borrowed by Chimwemwe Mputahero, Adamson Chunga and William Phakamisa former employees of the newspaper, The Malawian, who had borrowed the car in order to go to a funeral during the time of the incident. They were later released.

== Personal ==
He is the son of the late John Tembo, who held top government posts under President Hastings Banda and later was President of the Malawi Congress Party.
