= Aleke Banda =

Malawian politician

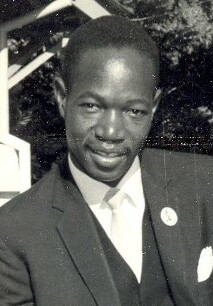
- Aleke Banda

Personal details
- Born: 1939
- Died: 9 April 2010 (age 70–71)

Aleke Kadonaphani Banda (1939 – 9 April 2010) was a Malawian politician who served as a Member of Parliament, as Minister of Finance, and as Minister of Agriculture in Malawi. He was also co-founder of 'the Nation Publications Limited'. Banda's life in politics (1953–2008) was devoted intensely to his country as it gained independence from the United Kingdom in 1964, as it established the political and economic structures of an independent state under Hastings Kamuzu Banda and as it created the framework of a multiparty democracy under Bakili Muluzi. Banda died from leukemia on 9 April 2010.

== Early life ==
Aleke Banda was born in Northern Rhodesia (now Zambia) and educated in Southern Rhodesia (now Zimbabwe). His family's home district, however, was Nkhata Bay, in the northern Region of Malawi. His father worked in Livingstone, Zambia, before moving to Moss Mine near Que Que (Kwekwe) in Southern Rhodesia, where Aleke Banda attended school. He became involved in politics from a young age and was imprisoned. In 1959 on release from prison he entered Malawi for the first time.

He is believed to be the first cousin of Zambian politician and former President Rupiah Banda.

== Career ==
He was the chairman of The Nation Publications Limited, Malawi's influential private media house that publishes the newspapers The Nation, Weekend Nation, Nation on Sunday and FUKO. He invited controversial journalist Ken Lipenga to be a founder and editor in chief of the newspaper, The Nation. He was imprisoned under the Banda regime for no charge and this was contested by despite being a co founder of the Malawi Congress Party together with Orton ChirwaAmnesty International. In communication no. 63/92 Krishna Achuthan appealed to the commission on behalf of his father-in-law, Aleke Banda. He had been imprisoned for 12 years without legal charge or trial. When Mr. Achuthan met with two successive heads of intelligence of Malawi they confirmed that there no case pending against Mr. Banda, but that he was being held "at the pleasure of the head of state."

== Political career ==
He was Minister of Finance from 1994 to 1997, and Minister of Agriculture from 1997 to 2005. He was also Minister of Health. He was also President of the People's Progressive Movement.

Aleke retired from active politics due to his ailment and was hospitalized in South Africa.

== Film ==
- Lifecycles: A Story of AIDS in Malawi (Documentary Film) - 2003, Played self Minister of Health
