= Maxwell Mkwezalamba =

Malawian politician and economist

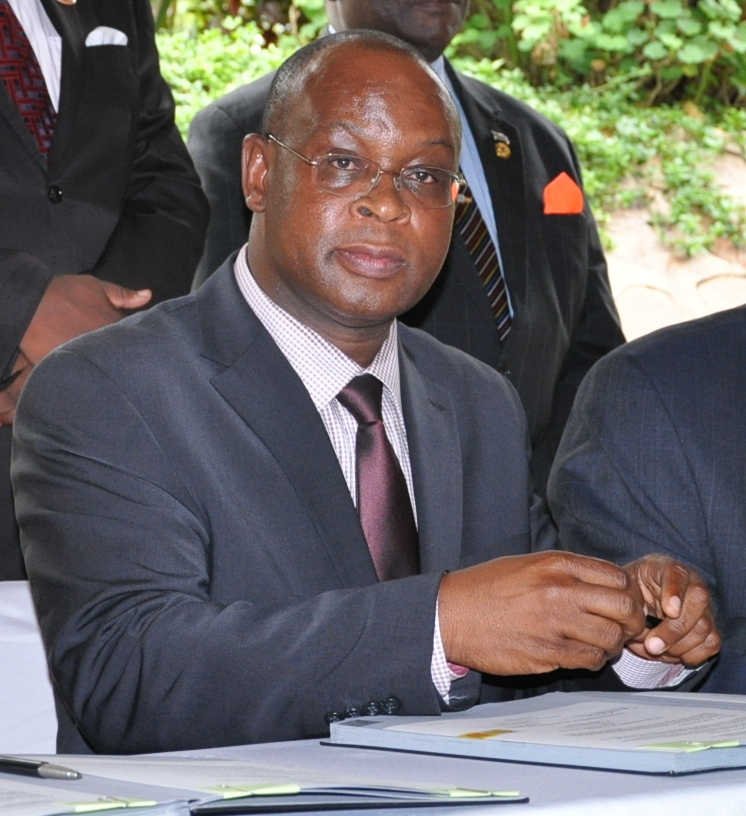
Mkwezalamba in 2014

Maxwell Mkwezalamba (born December 22, 1959) is a Malawian politician and economist. He is currently First Alternate Executive Director for Africa Group 1 Constituency, comprising 23 African countries, at the International Monetary Fund in Washington, DC, USA. Before this appointment, he briefly served as Minister of Finance for Malawi under former President Dr. Joyce Banda, before Cabinet was dissolved prior to the May 20, 2014 Tripartite Elections. Between May 2004 and April 2013, he served as Commissioner for Economic Affairs for the African Union in Addis Ababa, Ethiopia. When President Peter Mutharika ascended to power in June 2014, the Finance portfolio was given to Goodall Gondwe.

He graduated in Economics from Chancellor College, University of Malawi with an honours degree in Economics, where he subsequently lectured and headed the Economics Department. He obtained a Master's degree in Economics in 1984 from the University of Manchester, UK, a Master's degree in Policy Economics in 1992 and a PhD in Economics in 1995 from the University of Illinois at Urbana-Champaign, Illinois, USA.

In addition to lecturing at the University of Malawi, he has worked in various capacities for the Malawi Confederation of Chambers of Commerce and Industry, the World Bank and the Malawi Government. From May 2013 to October 2013, he was a Consultant for the World Bank, Africa Region's Regional Integration Division, on Regional Development Initiatives for the Great Lakes Region of Africa, with a focus on Burundi, Democratic Republic of Congo (DRC), Rwanda and Uganda. He has also worked as a consultant on development, financial and economic management issues for the Malawi Government, the United Nations Development Programme (UNDP), the United Nations Children's Fund (UNICEF), the World Bank, and the Germany Agency for Technical Cooperation (GTZ).

Mkwezalamba was a founding member of the Economics Association of Malawi (ECAMA) and served as its first President between 1998 and 2000. He was a member of the Monetary Policy Committee and the Economic Management Team in Malawi between 2000 and 2003 and also served as Secretary to Cabinet Committees on the Economy and Budgetary and Financial Matters during the same period. Between 1997 and 2003, he served on Boards of several organizations, including National Roads Authority, Shire Bus Lines, David Whitehead and Sons, PFG Wright Insurance Brokers, and the Malawi Institute of Management.

He has led and supervised the preparations of major technical and policy-oriented analytical work in Malawi, at the World Bank and at the African Union Commission. Some of this work includes "The Malawi Public Expenditure Review (2000)", "The Malawi Poverty Reduction Strategy Paper (2000-02)", "The Review of the Implementation of the Malawi Poverty Reduction Strategy (2003)", and "The Review of the Attainment of the Millennium Development Goals in Africa- An African Common Position (2005)". He also contributed to the preparation of the "Malawi Country Economic Memorandum (1999-2000)"; two World Bank Structural Adjustment Credits (SACs) for Malawi, namely, "The Malawi Fiscal Restructuring and Deregulation Project (FRDP) I and II"; and Malawi's National Long-Term Perspective Study (NLTPS)- "Malawi Vision 2020".

He has also provided strategic leadership in the annual joint publications of the African Union Commission, the United Nations Economic Commission for Africa (UNECA), the African Development Bank (AfDB), and the United Nations Development Programme (UNDP). These include "Assessing Regional Integration in Africa", "Economic Report on Africa", "African Statistical Yearbook", and "Assessing Progress in the Attainment of the Millennium Development Goals in Africa. In addition, he has been Executive and Managing Editor of "African Integration Review", a biannual journal of the African Union Commission's Department of Economic Affairs.

Between 2009 and 2013, Mkwezalamba served as the African Union's Sherpa for the G20 Summit. In this capacity, he played a key role in articulating African Union's position in the G20 Sherpa's meetings, that prepare for the G20 Summits of Leaders. Further, from 2008 to 2013, he played an active role in the preparations of the African Union for the G8 Summits, working closely with G8-Africa Personal Representatives of Heads of State and Government.

While at the African Union Commission, Mkwezalamba worked relentlessly in promoting Africa's integration, growth and development agenda. This was done in collaboration with the African Union Member States, the Regional Economic Communities (RECs), and various partners, including the United Nations Economic Commission for Africa (UNECA) and the African Development Bank (AfDB). His focus was on providing policy guidance, strategic thinking and direction, overall supervision and management, political and technical leadership.

The areas covered included economic policy formulation, coordination and harmonization at the continental level; establishment of the pan-African financial institutions, namely, the African Central Bank, the African Investment Bank, and the African Monetary Fund; and private sector development, investment, and resources mobilization, including alternative sources of financing the African Union. Other areas were economic cooperation and regional integration; statistical development in Africa; the attainment of the Millennium Development Goals in Africa; the integration of the New Partnership for Africa's Development (NEPAD) in the structures and processes of the African Union; and the development of Common African Positions related to economic, financial and development issues.

Author of several papers and publications, Mkwezalamba's areas of specialization include Macro-Economic Theory and Policy, Monetary Economics, Public Finance, International Trade and Finance, and Economics of Development. He also has experience and expertise in Econometrics, Statistics, Regional Integration, Private Sector Development, and Investment Appraisal and Business Finance.
