= Nelson P. W. Khonje =

Malawian politician (1923–2019)

Nelson P. W. Khonje (6 December 1923 – 24 November 2019) was a Malawian politician who was Speaker of Parliament from 1975 to 1987.

Khonje was born in Neno, Malawi (formerly Nyasaland). He went to school at Matandani and Malamulo Seventh Day Adventist schools. He taught whilst upgrading himself and by 1959 had qualified for Cambridge O-Level through correspondence. In 1962, alongside Late Aaron Gadama he applied for a scholarship and was sent to Moray House College of Education in Edinburgh, Scotland. Returning to Malawi in 1964 to teach at Masongola, Ntcheu and Ntchisi Secondary Schools up to 1971.

In 1971 when Mwanza was de-linked from Blantyre as district he was asked by the constituents to represent them in the Malawi national Assembly. He became the first member of Parliament for Mwanza in the same year. In 1974 he was made a Deputy Speaker of parliament and was made full speaker in 1975, a position he held up to his retirement in 1987. He holds the record of being Malawi's longest serving speaker of the National Assembly, under the one party dictatorship of Dr. Hastings Kamuzu Banda.

Khonje died in November 2019 at the age of 95.
