= Sosten Gwengwe =

Malawian politician (born 1977)

Honorable Sosten Gwengwe, M.P.
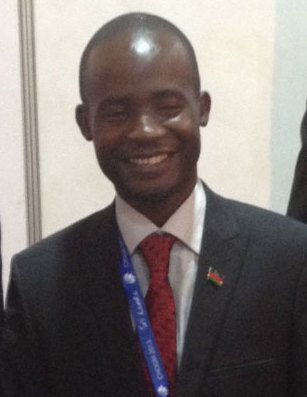
- Gwengwe in 2013

Minister of Finance & Economic Affairs
- In office 30 January 2022 – 7 October 2023
- President: Lazarus Chakwera
- Preceded by: Felix Mlusu
- Succeeded by: Simplex Chithyola Banda

Minister of Trade
- In office 28 June 2020 – 26 January 2022
- President: Lazarus Chakwera
- Preceded by: Salim Bagus
- In office 2012–2014
- President: Joyce Banda

Member of Parliament Lilongwe Msozi North
- Incumbent
- Assumed office 2017
- Preceded by: Highton Jiya

Member of Parliament Dedza Central
- In office 2009–2014

Personal details
- Born: 20 May 1977 (age 49)
- Party: Malawi Congress Party
- Spouse: Colovine Gwengwe
- Education: Malawi Polytechnic (B.Acc); OBU (MBA)
- Profession: Management accountant

Sosten Gwengwe (born 20 May 1977) is a Malawian politician who served as the Minister of Finance and Economic Affairs of the Republic of Malawi from January 30, 2022 until his replacement in October 2023. He previously served as Minister of Trade from June 2020 until his appointment as Finance and Economic Affairs Minister.

Gwengwe was first elected to Parliament in 2009 as a member of the Malawi Congress Party, but announced on August 31, 2011 that he was switching to the Democratic Progressive Party because the MCP "had nothing to offer to the country" and the DPP under President Bingu wa Mutharika had a "clear vision of developing the country". Following the death of President Mutharika, he joined the People's Party.

== Early life and education ==
Gwengwe is a Chartered Management Accountant (CIMA) and has worked in both public and private sector. He holds a Bachelor of Accountancy degree which he obtained from the University of Malawi (The Polytechnic). He is also a holder of Master of Business Administration (Finance) from Oxford Brookes University of the United Kingdom.

Gwengwe has teaching experience after teaching various Business Management courses at London Vocational, Management and Training Business School (an Emile Wolf College) in London. In Malawi, he established Dzuka Girls Secondary School, Dzuka Girls Primary School, Dzuka Private Academy, Alice Gwengwe Foundation, Sosten Gwengwe Foundation and Gwengwe Private Academy.

== Political career ==
Gwengwe is a member of Parliament for Lilongwe Msonzi North. His political career started in 2009 when he was first elected as Member of Parliament for Dedza Central Constituency.

In 2014, President Joyce Banda picked Gwengwe to be her running mate. Banda lost the elections and Gwengwe failed to become the Vice President of the country.

In 2020 Grengwe resigned as chair of the Budget and Finance Committee as that committee should always by led by a person whose party is not in government. His role was taken by Gladys Ganda who is a Democratic Progressive Party member.

Gwengwe has served in the cabinet in various capacities and ministries including Ministry of Transport and Ministry of Industry and Trade. In 2022 he was serving as Minister of Finance after being promoted in a February Cabinet Reshuffle by President Lazarus Chakwera.

Gwengen was chosen in November 2025 as the President of the Parliamentary committee that looks at the budget. He and the vice-President, Emily Phiri, could serve until 2030.

== Other activities ==
- International Monetary Fund (IMF), Ex-Officio Member of the Board of Governors (since 2022)
