= Samuel Mpasu =

Malawian writer, diplomat, politician, and civil servant (1945–2018)

Sam Mpasu (17 September 1945 – 15 February 2018) was a Malawian politician, author, and former diplomat. He served as Minister of Commerce, Secretary General of the United Democratic Front (UDF) in 1999, and speaker of the Malawi National Assembly.

== Early life ==
Mpasu was a student at Dedza secondary school and went to University of Malawi's Chancellor College.

== Career ==
Mpasu served as a diplomat in the foreign service for the Malawi mission to Germany. While in Germany he wrote a book in 1975 entitled Nobody's Friend, which got him arrested because the Kamuzu Banda regime thought that it was written about Kamuzu Banda. Mpasu was detained without trial for "two years, one month, one week, and one day" in Mikuyu Prison from 1975 to 1977.

From 1978 Mpasu worked at Lever Bros (now Unilever) in various capacities until 1988 when he was seconded to run the Malawi Confederation of Chambers of Commerce and Industry (MCCCI). In 1991, while working for Xerographics, he joined a secret group headed by Bakili Muluzi whose aim was to build up opposition to Banda. When the United Democratic Front was voted into government in 1994, Mpasu was elected Member of Parliament for Ntcheu Central, and appointed Minister of Education and Government Chief Whip in Parliament.

He later served as Minister of Commerce and Speaker of the Malawi House of Assembly. His appointment as Minister of Commerce met with a lot of resistance since he was the Speaker of the House at that time. The court attempted to block President Bakili Muluzi from posting him to this position.

=== Civil servants' strike 1997 ===
On April 8, 1997, whilst he was UDF Secretary General, during a strike in which civil servants were demanding higher salaries as recommended by the Chatsika Report, he was pelted with stones in Zomba while driving to the Parliament Building. He was hit in the jaw.

=== Fieldyork notebook scandal ===
In 2008 a Malawian court sentenced him to a six-year prison sentence over charges of corruption and abuse of office dating back 14 years. He was accused of receiving kickbacks and failing to use normal channels of awarding contracts for awarding a British company, Fieldyork, a deal to provide Malawi with millions of notebooks and pencils when he served as Minister of Education. However, his incarceration was received with ambivalence after having been tried prior to the 2008 court case while he was Minister as a gesture to clear his name. D.D. Phiri, a prominent historian and writer in Malawi, wrote in the Nation on October 13, 2009: "In its 1994 manifesto, UDF pledged to introduce free primary education in Malawi. When he won the presidency, Bakili Muluzi appointed Sam Mpasu as Minister of Education. The Minister of Education was more anxious than most people that exercise books and pencils be made available in time, otherwise the free primary schooling programme was going to fail." Mpasu was released from jail in 2010 instead of 2014 due to good behaviour.

== Death ==
Mpasu was found dead in his house on 15 February 2018.

== Books ==
- Nobody's Friend (1975). (Republished by African Publishing Group, 1995)
- Political Prisoner 3/75 of Dr. H. Kamuzu Banda of Malawi (1995). African Publishing Group, Harare.
- The Hare and Other Folktales (2015).

== Movies ==
- Black Gold, as self
- Lifecycles: A Story of AIDS in Malawi (2003), as self, Speaker of the House
