= Friday Jumbe =

Malawian politician and economist

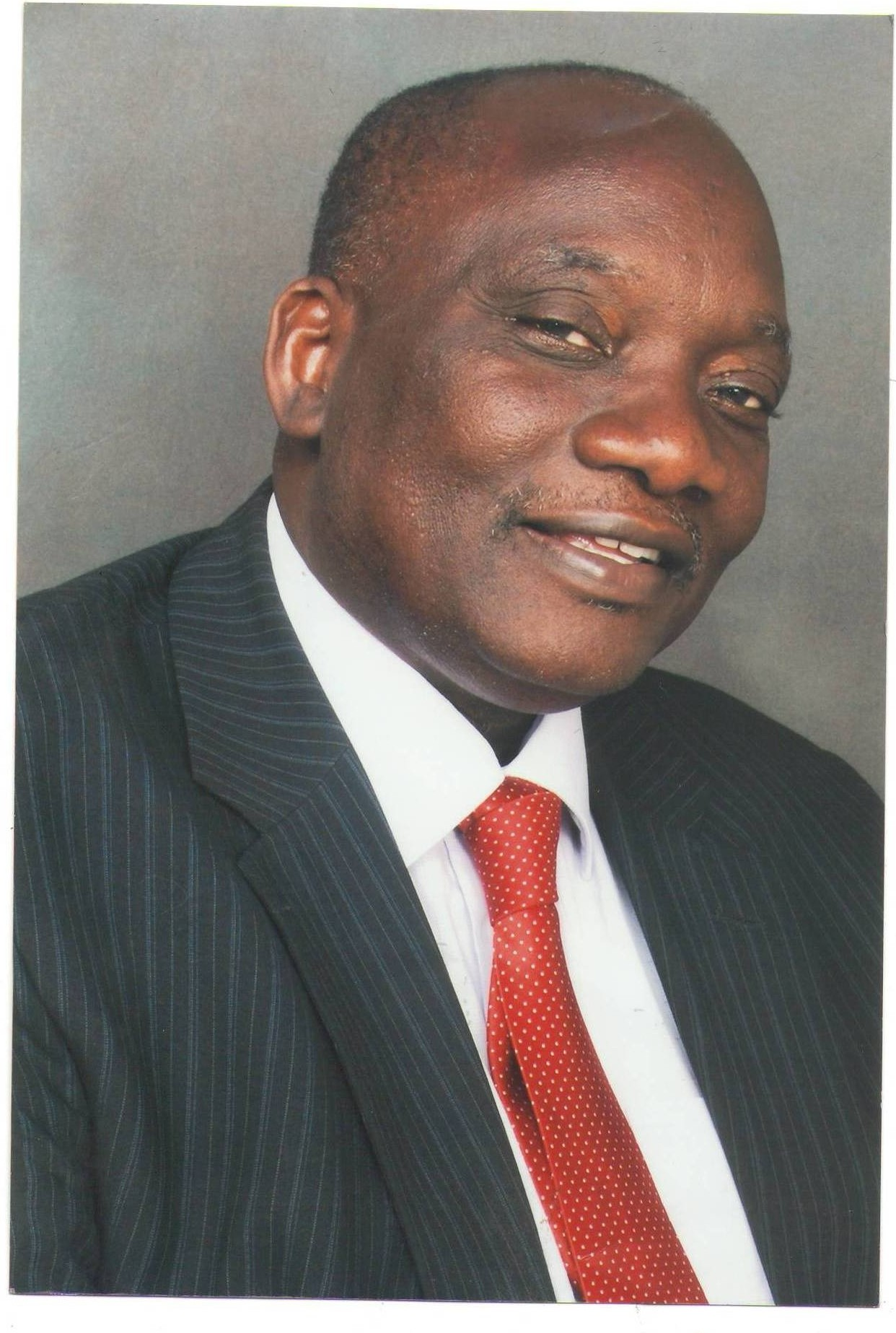
Jumbe in 2014

Friday Anderson Jumbe (born 4 April 1955) is a Malawian economist and politician who served in the government of Malawi as Minister of Finance and Economic Planning under President Bakili Muluzi, representing the United Democratic Front.

== Early life and education ==
Jumbe studied economics and political science and obtained a bachelor's degree in 1977 from Chancellor College, University of Malawi. He obtained a postgraduate diploma in project planning and appraisal from the University of Bradford in 1980. In 1985 he obtained a Master of Science degree in finance and banking for development from Finafrica in Milan, Italy. In 2013 he was working on a doctoral dissertation in finance at Exploits University, a private university in Malawi. His doctoral research was on the Malawian economy and its performance under aid packages from donors and multilateral institutions.

== Career ==
Jumbe worked as a projects analyst at the Malawi Development Corporation in 1977. He was General manager of National Oil Industries for seven years, and Chief executive Officer of the Agricultural Development and Marketing Corporation (ADMARC) for eight years. He headed the boards of the Illovo Sugar Corporation, the National Bank of Malawi, Auction Holdings Ltd and the Finance Corporation of Malawi. He also served on various boards of private companies between 1985 and 2002.

Jumbe was elected Member of Parliament for Chiradzulu Central Constituency. In 2002 he was appointed Minister of Finance and Economic Planning, and held the post until 2004.

In 2004, Jumbe was arrested in connection with his alleged mismanagement of Malawi's strategic reserve of maize.

In 2009, Jumbe was interim leader of the United Democratic Front.

In 2012, Jumbe became acting President of the United Democratic Front, but subsequently alleged that Bakili Muluzi had not given him access to the party's finances, that he had therefore had to run the party with his own funds, and that this had been a ploy with the goal of preparing Muluzi's son Atupele Muluzi to take power.

In 2013, he was the leader of the New Labour Party. Also that year he faced bankruptcy proceedings related to a refusal to pay legal fees.

In February 2014, Jumbe formally announced his intention to run for President of Malawi.
