= Louis Chimango =

Malawian politician (born 1943)

Louis Joseph Chimango (born 19 October 1943) was a long-time cabinet minister in Late Hastings Kamuzu Banda's cabinet from 1978 to 1994. He had trained as a lawyer and later on as a barrister from Grays Inn in London. He later taught at the law school at Chancellor College in Zomba, a constituent of the University of Malawi, from 1970, before being nominated for politics in 1978. He left the law school when he was the dean of the Faculty of Law. During Late Kamuzu Banda's time he held a number of cabinet portfolios including those of Minister of Finance (1980-1981 and 1987-1994), Health, Local Government, and Education, among others. After Late Kamuzu's defeat in the 1993 referendum he maintained his seat in Parliament and was later elected Speaker of the National Assembly of Malawi from June 2005-June 2009. A member of the Malawi Congress Party, he represented the Lilongwe Mpenu Nkhoma constituency, a seat which he lost during the 1999 Late Bingu wa Mutharika's regime. He was also a member of the Pan-African Parliament.

He is married to Jane Chimango, a senior lecturer at Kamuzu College of Nursing. He has four children and several grandchildren. He has since retired from active politics and is considered to be running his personal businesses. He is known to have orchestrated a number of national activities including spearheading the current constitution between 1995 and 1997. He was the favourite to pick up the mantle after John Tembo had left the presidency of the Malawi Congress Party. He is considered amongst the cleanest politicians to have come out of the Kamuzu's era of dirty crocodile politics.

In May 2008 Chimango was asked to resign his post due to lack of confidence from opposition legislators for his open bias towards government.

== See also ==
- List of current members of the National Assembly of Malawi
