= Malawi Prison System =

Prison system in Malawi

The Malawi prison system, managed by the Malawi Prison Service, has 23 district prison stations, which are either first class or second class prisons. Zomba Central Prison built in 1935 is the only maximum security prison in the country, holding prisoners with long sentences or serious offences. Severe overcrowding throughout the prison system provides a conducive environment for the rapid spread of HIV/AIDS and Tuberculosis.

== History ==
The prison system dates back to colonial times when Malawi was divided in two regions; Southern Province (now Southern region) and Northern Province (now Central and Northern regions). In the Southern Province were 9 jails and in the Northern 10. The Prison Department employed fewer than 200 personnel distributed into several posts such as, superintendents and guards.

The jails that were in the districts were for holding prisoners with short sentences. They were controlled by a District Commissioner with civil police as guards. The Zomba Central Prison held people with much longer sentences and was under the control of the King's African Rifles. It held Europeans, Asiatics (or Coloureds) and Africans. Males and females were separate. The jail in Blantyre, which was under the charge of a superintendent held Europeans only.

When Malawi gained independence in 1964 problems such as racial discrimination, torture, arbitrary arrests and forced labor were still rampant in the criminal justice system. Under "Life President", Dr Hastings Kamuzu Banda, political prisoners were held without trial and severely mistreated by prison guards.

== Modern structure of Prison Department ==
Since the onset of democratic government in 1994, the prison system in Malawi has changed. A Chief Commissioner of Prisons, who works under the Minister of Home Affairs and Internal Security, heads the Malawi Prison Service. The system has its head office in Zomba and is divided into five divisions: Operations, Farms, Prison Clinic, Prison Training School and General Administration.

Among the large prisons are:

- The old maximum security prison, Zomba Central Prison, built in 1935, which has six cell blocks: one for juvenile offenders, one for first offenders, two for recurrent offenders, one for women, and one for condemned prisoners.
- Maula Prison built in the 1960s in the capital city of Lilongwe.
- Chichiri Prison a large prison in the commercial city of Blantyre. (Date of opening unknown)

== Spreading of disease ==
Malawi, as a developing country, faces many problems in its prisons, especially the fast spread of HIV/AIDS and TB, which are mainly caused by the rapidly increasing number of inmates. For example, Maula Prison was intended to house 800 inmates but now holds approximately 1,805 inmates, all but 24 of them men. Malawian prisons are estimated to exceed their capacity by 200%.

These large numbers make for extremely unsanitary conditions. This in combination with bad nutrition gives an abnormally high death rate. Prisoners deal with dirty water, foul toilets and intermittently working showers.4 Cells built for 50 or 60 people now hold up to 150 people. Prisoners sleep on blankets on the floor too tightly packed even to turn around. One inmate awakens the rest each night for mass turnovers. The most privileged inmates sleep on their backs, ringing the walls of the cell. Everyone else sleeps on his side. There are no prison uniforms, no blankets with which to cover themselves, and no soap. Inmates have a monotonous diet of nsima and beans with water.

These conditions, together with rampant diseases like scabies and tuberculosis, are the main reasons that Maula Prison lost an average of 30 prisoners a year in 2003 and 2004, about 1 death per 60 inmates. Zomba Prison loses one in 20 inmates annually. When prisoners are found with these diseases, they are not often given medical attention or quarantined, which allows the diseases to spread even further. Malawi prisons with HIV/Aids patients have high death rates due to the prisoners’ weak immune systems worsened by the lack of an appropriate diet and anti-retroviral therapy. Several organizations have challenged the government through the courts to consider having a well-balanced diet for the prisoners who are HIV positive.

Another major issue is the lack of legal representation available to the average Malawian. Malawi's 12,000,000 to 13,000,000 citizens have 28 legal aid attorneys and eight prosecutors with law degrees. There are jobs for 32 prosecutors but salaries are so low that vacancies go unfilled. Therefore, except in special cases like murder and manslaughter, almost all accused go to trial without lawyers. Malawi's High Court, which has to pass judgment on all capitals crimes, has not heard a single homicide case in the last year, simply because there is no money to assemble lawyers, judges and witnesses for hearings in the localities where the crimes occurred. There are many cases of people who sit in jail simple because their case files were misplaced.

Malawi still has a death penalty, but no execution has been ordered by the last two presidents.

The current president and the previous president have made an attempt to show amnesty and at the same time relieve the pressure on prisons by pardoning large numbers of prisoners at one time. The previous president Dr Baliki Muluzi in 1995 released 650 prisoners on Malawi's 31st Independence Day celebrations. The former president Dr Bingu Wa Mutharika, ordered the release of 398 prisoners in 2007. These were prisoners who had served at least half of their sentence and were of good behavior.

== New prisons ==
The new Mzimba Prison has conditions high above those of many other Malawian prisons, with beds and comfortable mattresses. Prisoners get food three times a day and have well-ventilated cells. The facility also provides services and activities for prisoners, such as teaching them skills so they go back into society as law-abiding citizens. The Malawi Prison Service plans to open additional prisons in Rumphi Mchinji and Salima.
