= Malawi Prison Band =

Malawian prison music group

- Origin: Zomba, Malawi
- Genres: Afro pop
- Years active: 2008–Present
- Labels: Malawi Prison Records

The Malawi Prison Band, also known as the Malawi Police Band, is a prison music group composed of prisoners and officers from the Malawi Prison Service. In 2016, the group was nominated for the Grammy Award.

== History ==
The Malawi Prison Band was formed in 2008 by a group of prisoners at Zomba Central Prison, with the support of prison officers. The band's project titled I Have No Everything Here, which was recorded in the prison in January was nominated for the Best World Music Album in 2015.

The band was formed largely to entertain the inmates at the prison, which already at the time had the Malawi Prison Brass Band.

=== Band members ===
The band consists of prisoners and officers from various prisons in Malawi. Members include singers, instrumentalists, and dancers.

== Type of music ==
The band's music style is a fusion of traditional Malawian music and modern genres such as pop and rock. The band has performed at various festivals, including the Lake of Stars Festival and the Blantyre Arts Festival.
