= Another Mississippi Sunday Morning =

Live album by Parchman Prison Prayer
- Released: January 17, 2025
- Recorded: February 2024
- Venue: Parchman Prison
- Genre: gospel, blues
- Length: 29:16
- Label: Glitterbeat
- Producer: Ian Brennan

Parchman Prison Prayer chronology
Some Mississippi Sunday Morning (2023)	Another Mississippi Sunday Morning (2025)

Another Mississippi Sunday Morning is an album of gospel and blues songs, sung by inmates at Parchman Prison. The recordings were made live at a chapel service in February 2024, and the album was released by Glitterbeat Records, a subsidiary of Glitterhouse Records, on January 17, 2025.

== Background and release ==
Parchman Prison is a maximum security prison in Mississippi, United States. The prison was opened in 1901 as a penal farm. In 1939 recordings of Bukka White were made at Parchman Prison by musicologist John Lomax.

In February 2023, music producer Ian Brennan visited Parchman Prison and recorded inmates at a specially organized chapel service. Fourteen of those recordings were released by Glitterbeat as the album Some Mississippi Sunday Morning in 2023. The visit had taken three years to organize, and per the conditions of Brennan's agreement with the prison, the first names of the musicians appearing on the album were not made public, and no photographs of them were published.

Brennan returned to Parchman Prison in February 2024, and once more recorded prisoners at a chapel service. Thirteen of the recordings were included on Another Mississippi Sunday Morning, which was released in January 2025; each was recorded live in one take, with no overdubs. Twelve men, ranging in age from 23 to 74, appear on the album.

== Critical reception ==
Professional ratings
Review scores
Source	Rating
Mojo	3/5 stars
Record Collector	4/5 stars
Rolling Stone Germany	4/5 stars
Songlines	4/5 stars
Uncut	7/10

In a review for Songlines, Billy Rough called the album "raw, haunting and profoundly moving." Uncut called the vocal performances "raw and soulful."

The opening track "Parchman Prison Blues" is sung by six inmates of Parchman Prison, four of whom are serving life sentences, including one 66-year-old who has spent most of his adult life incarcerated there. Songlines called the song a "haunting, wordless lament." Lois Wilson of Record Collector said the song "draws a line from [the singers'] hurt and hardship to that from which gospel was originally born."

== Track listing ==
No.	Title	Writer(s)	Length
1.	"Parchman Prison Blues "	L. Stevenson, M. Palmer	2:27
2.	"Open the Floodgates of Heaven"	D. West	1:43
3.	"Grace Will Lead Me On"	M. Palmer	3:48
4.	"MC Hammer"	J. Robinson, L. Stevenson	1:59
5.	"Po' Child"	C. Jackson	1:11
6.	"Take Me to the King"	D. Justice	2:28
7.	"Living Testimony"	L. Williams	1:39
8.	"I Shall Not Want"	M. Kyles	3:54
9.	"I Won't Complain"	M. Kyles	1:13
10.	"God is Keeping Me"	L. Stevenson	1:55
11.	"Talking About My Jesus"	N. Best	0:58
12.	"Stand for You"	J. Sherman	0:58
13.	"Jesus Will Never Say No"	L. Williams	5:03
Total length:			29:16

== See also ==
- Zomba Prison Project
