= Mzuzu Central Prison =

Prison in Malawi, Africa

- Interactive map of Mzuzu Central Prison
- Location: Mzuzu, Malawi; 11.45807°S 34.015131°E
- Status: Operational
- Security class: Maximum (male and female)
- Capacity: 800
- Opened: 1956
- Managed by: Malawi Prison Service

Mzuzu Central Prison is a prison in Mzuzu City in Mzimba District, Malawi. The prison is the largest in the northern region of the country as it was built to address the growing need for a secure facility to hold criminals and political offenders in the region.

== History ==
=== Formation ===
The prison was established in the 1950s during the British colonial era, with the aim of detaining and rehabilitating offenders from the northern region of Malawi.
