= Kasungu Prison =

Prison in Malawi, Africa

Coordinates: 13°02′S 33°29′E

Kasungu Central Prison
- Interactive map of Kasungu Central Prison
- Location: Kasungu, Malawi
- Status: Operational
- Security class: Maximum (male and female)
- Capacity: 1,500
- Opened: 1930
- Managed by: Malawi Prison Service

Kasungu Prison, also known as Kasungu Central Prison, is a maximum-security prison located in Kasungu, Malawi.

== History ==
=== Formation ===
Kasungu Prison was established in 1930 during the British colonial era as a response to the growing need for a secure facility to house prisoners in the northern region of Malawi. At first, it was designed to hold 200 prisoners but was expanded and further renovated to accommodate a larger population.

=== Places ===
The prison consists of several buildings, including cellblocks, dormitories, kitchen and dining areas, and administrative offices. The facility also has a hospital wing, a chapel, and recreational spaces for prisoners.

== Facilities ==
The prison has a capacity of approximately 1,500 inmates, although it has held more than 2,000 prisoners at times due to overcrowding.

== Scandals ==
Kasungu Prison has been involved in several incidents, including poisoning.
