= Zomba Central Prison =

Prison in Malawi, Africa

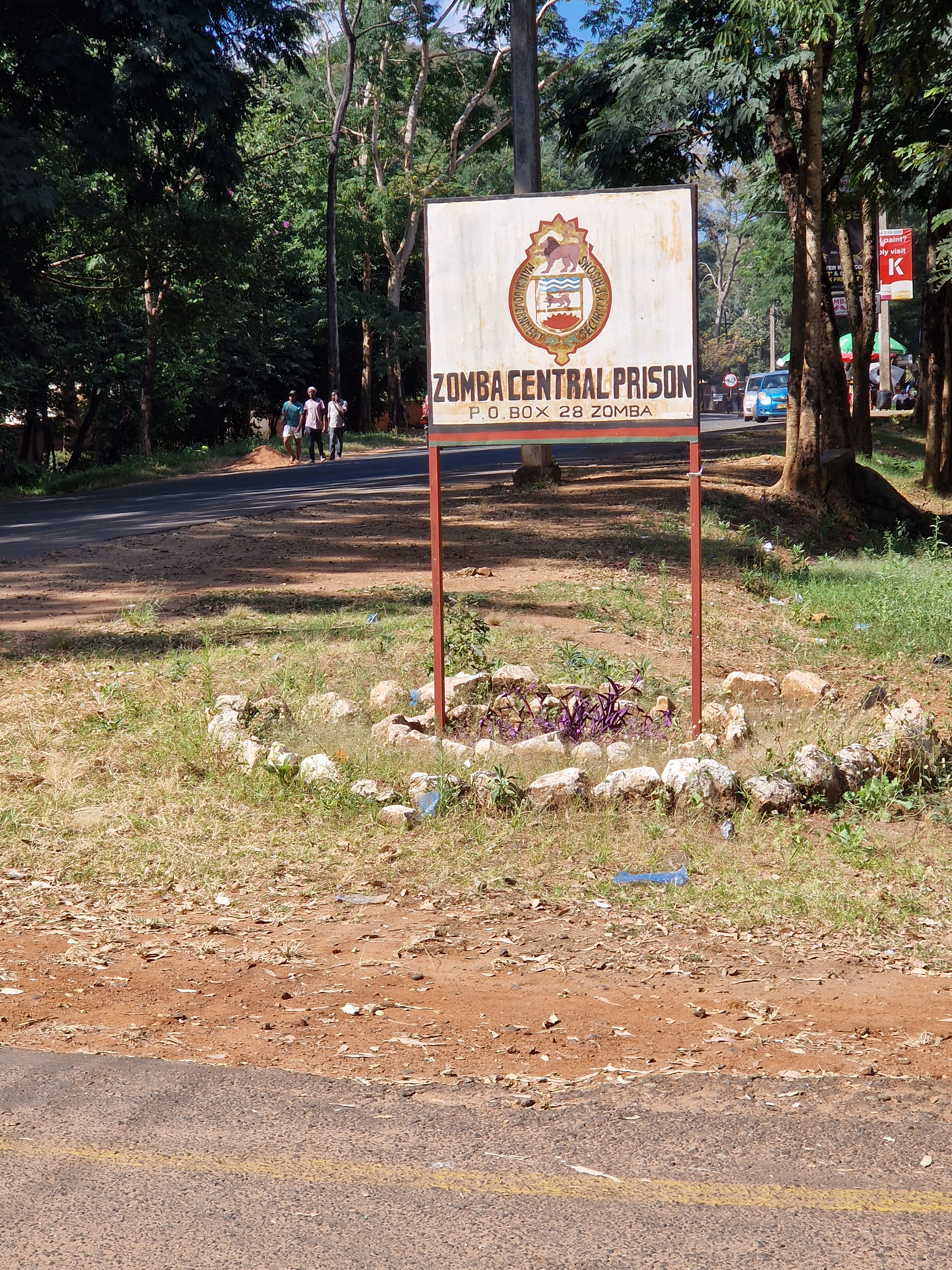
- in 2026
- Interactive map of Zomba Central Prison
- Location: Zomba, Malawi; 15°23′13″S 35°19′09″E
- Status: Operational
- Security class: Maximum (male and female)
- Capacity: 340
- Opened: January 1935
- Managed by: Malawi Prison Service

Zomba Central Prison is a referral national prison in Malawi. It is the biggest prison in Malawi. In January 2024, the prison was moved to Lilongwe.

== History ==
=== Formation ===
Zomba Central Prison was built in 1935 during the British colonial era in Malawi (then known as Nyasaland). It was designed to hold 340 prisoners and was intended to serve as a maximum-security facility for the country.

=== Facilities ===
The prison has six cell blocks, including the blocks for juvenile offenders, first offenders, recurrent offenders, women and condemned prisoners.

The prison also has facilities for prisoners to work and receive training, such as a workshop, a farm, and a tailoring shop.

=== Zomba Prison Project ===
The prison was the location of the musical collaboration Zomba Prison Project, a 20-track compilation produced by Ian Brennan and his wife Italian photographer Marilena Umuhoza Delli and released in 2015 by Six Degrees Records featuring recordings of compositions and performances by inmates at the prison. The album was nominated for a Grammy Award for Best World Music Album, the first ever Grammy nomination by Malawian artists.

Brennan and Delli, returned to the prison twice more in 2016 to compile a second album titled I Will Not Stop Singing.
