= Mwanza Prison =

Prison in Malawi, Africa

- Interactive map of Mwanza Prison
- Location: Mwanza, Malawi; 15°35′55″S 34°31′04″E
- Status: Operational
- Security class: Maximum (male and female)
- Capacity: 1,500
- Opened: 1990
- Managed by: Malawi Prison Service

Mwanza Prison is the prison located in Mwanza District in the Southern Region of Malawi on the border with Mozambique. The prison is controlled and maintained by the Malawi Prison Service that in turn controls 23 district prison stations, including the Mwanza Prison, which are either first-class or second-class prisons. The aim of the Malawi Prison Service is to provide humane and effective correctional services to prisoners.

== History ==
=== Formation ===
Mwanza Prison is part of the Malawi Prison Service, which was established by the Prisons Act of 1956. This act was enacted by the British colonial government, which had previously administered prisons in Malawi through the colonial police force.
