= Balaka Prison =

Prison in Malawi, Africa

- Interactive map of Balaka Prison
- Location: Balaka Township, Malawi, Malawi; 14°55′S 34°52′E
- Status: Operational
- Security class: Maximum (male and female)
- Capacity: 1,500
- Opened: 1971
- Managed by: Malawi Prison Service

Balaka Prison, also known as Balaka Maximum Security Prison, is a prison located in Balaka, Malawi. The prison has a capacity of approximately 1,500 inmates, but it usually holds more than 2,000 prisoners due to overcrowding. The prison provides a safe and secure environment for the rehabilitation and reintegration of offenders into society.

== History ==
=== Formation ===
Balaka Prison was established in 1971 during the Kamuzu Banda era as a maximum-security prison to house political prisoners and criminals.

Balaka Prison is situated in the township of Balaka, in Balaka District, approximately 250 kilometers north of Blantyre.

== Facilities ==
The prison has several facilities, including cellblocks, a chapel, a mosque, a hospital, and recreational facilities. The prison also has a farm that produces food for the inmates.

== Aim ==
The prison aims at providing a humane and dignified treatment of inmates, preparing them for reintegration into society upon release.
