= Let Us Now Praise Sleepy John =

Studio album by Peter Case
- Released: August 7, 2007
- Recorded: San Francisco, CA
- Genre: Alternative rock, alternative country, folk rock
- Label: Yep Roc
- Producer: Ian Brennan

Peter Case chronology
Who's Gonna Go Your Crooked Mile? (2004)	Let Us Now Praise Sleepy John (2007)	Wig! (2010)

Let Us Now Praise Sleepy John is an album by American singer-songwriter Peter Case, released in 2007. It was nominated for a Grammy Award for Best Traditional Folk Album.

== History ==
The album was Case's first of new material in five years after six albums on the Vanguard label. The songs were written in tribute to blues artist Sleepy John Estes. Case wrote most of the songs in the middle of the night. "I’d wake up in the middle of the night and write. I woke up and a song would spill out… They just came out, fully formed. Other songs, like ‘Every 24 Hours,’ I wrote right before we went in the studio."

== Critical reception ==
Professional ratings
Review scores
Source	Rating
Allmusic	4/5 stars

Writing for Allmusic, music critic Mark Deming called Let Us Now Praise Sleepy John "a splendid album from a truly gifted artist." The album was nominated for a Grammy Award for Best Traditional Folk Album in 2008.

== Track listing ==
All songs written by Peter Case unless otherwise noted.

1. "Every 24 Hours" – 4:33
2. "Million Dollars Bail" – 3:43
3. "Underneath the Stars" – 3:51
4. "Just Hangin' On" – 2:14
5. "Ain't Gonna Worry No More" – 6:14
6. "Palookaville" – 3:19
7. "Get Away Blues" (Traditional) – 2:50
8. "The Open Road Song" – 3:17
9. "Some Bright Mornin' Blues" – 3:44
10. "I'm Gonna Change My Ways" – 3:25
11. "That Soul Twist" – 3:58

== Personnel ==
- Peter Case – vocals, guitar, harmonica, piano
- Duane Jarvis – guitar and percussion "I'm Gonna Change My Ways"
- Richard Thompson – guitar and vocal "Every 24 Hours"
- Norm Hamlet – pedal steel "That Soul Twist"
- Carlos Guitarlos – vocal "Underneath the Stars"
- Lysa Flores – vocal "Some Bright Mornin' Blues"

Production notes

- Ian Brennan – producer
- Peter Case – artwork
- Gabriel Shepard – engineer
- Craig Parker Adams, Rocky Grisez – mixing
- Gavin Lurssen – mastering
- Mary Gunn – graphic design
