= Dedza Prison =

Prison in Malawi, Africa

- Interactive map of Dedza Prison
- Location: Kasungu, Malawi; 14°20′S 34°20′E
- Status: Operational
- Security class: Maximum (male and female)
- Capacity: 600
- Opened: 1920
- Managed by: Malawi Prison Service

Dedza Prison is the prison located in the town of Dedza, in the central region of Malawi, at the foot of Dedza Mountain (7,211 feet or 2,198 meters). The prison was built to provide a secure and safe environment for prisoners, offer rehabilitation programs and vocational training, and prepare inmates for reintegration into society on release.

== History ==
=== Formation ===
Dedza Prison was established in the 1920 during the colonial era of Nyasaland (now Malawi). The prison was part of the colonial administration's efforts to establish a formal criminal justice system in the region.

== Structures ==
The prison complex consists of several buildings, including cellblocks, dormitories, kitchen and dining areas, administrative offices, a hospital wing, a chapel, recreational spaces, and vocational training workshops.
