= Yanna Momina =

Djiboutian singer and songwriter

- Born: Yanna Momina Abass; 1948; Djibouti
- Died: 2023 (aged 76)
- Labels: Glitterbeat Records

Yanna Momina Abass (1948–2023) was a Djiboutian singer and songwriter. Her only album Afar Ways was released in 2022, and she died shortly before her first planned international performance.

== Biography ==
Momina was born in Djibouti in 1948. She was Afar, an ethnic group that live in Eritrea, Ethiopia, and Djibouti. Unusually for an Afar woman, Momina wrote her own songs.

Momina's debut album Afar Ways was recorded in the hut where she lived in 2018, and was produced by Ian Brennan. The album was released on Glitterbeat Records in 2022. Francis Gooding of The Wire called the album "intimate and crisp" and said that the folk pop sound of the guitar-backed tracks "hints at a complex modernist tradition that a single album can only gesture toward."

Momina died in 2023 at the age of 76, one month before a planned appearance at the arts festival WOMAD, which would have been her first performance outside Djibouti.

== Albums ==
- Afar Ways (2022, Glitterbeat Records)
