= Wandika Phiri =

- Known for: leading the Malawi Prison Service (twice)
- Successor: Masauko Ng’ombeyagwada (interim)

Wandika (Grace) Phiri is a Malawian government official, leading the Malawi Prison Service. She became the Commissioner General for the Malawi Prisons Service in 2017. She moved away in 2020, but in November 2025 it was announced that her successor, Masauko Ng’ombeyagwada, had been moved and she would return.

== Life ==
In 2017, Malawi's President, Peter Mutharika, made important appointments that won the approval of gender activists. Phiri became the head of the Malawi Prison Service while Mercy Pindani and Belinda Gombachika were appointed to lead the Kamuzu College of nursing.

During her first year she faced a challenge because of discontent caused by the differing employment conditions between police officers and prison warders. She warned that staff needed to work normally while salary harmonisation was addressed and she threatened to charge those who did not comply with mutiny.

In January 2020 she went to the prison in Ntcheu where a new water system had been installed. The facility had been paid for by the Church of Central Africa Presbyterian synod in Blantyre.

In August 2020 the prison officers were dealing with prisoners and the risk of affection from COVID-19. Phiri thanked the Minister of Homeland Security Richard Chimwendo Banda when he visited and reassured the prison officers that an additional allowance would be paid. Phiri arranged for a large number of prisoners to be released early to reduce the pressure during the pandemic.

Homeland Security Minister, Jean Sendeza, ordered an investigation in 2022 over the smuggling of phones into prisons. She wanted the criminal activities of prison officers involved to be stopped and she demanded a report in seven days. Phiri stated that all holes would be sealed.

In 2023 she was moved to the President's office and Masauko Ng’ombeyagwada took over her role. However in 2025 Peter Mutharika was re-elected as President. Masauko Ng’ombeyagwada Wisikoti was transferred to a position in the department of Homeland Security because Wandika Phiri was returning.

Just after Christmas 2025 she joined Ministers Mary Navicha, Charles Mhango and Deputy Norman Chisale on a tour of Kachere Women’s Prison. It was an inspection but they also hoped to identify any of the 162 prisoners who might receive a Presidential pardon as the prison's capacity was designed to be 80.
