= Malawi Mouse Boys =

Malawian band

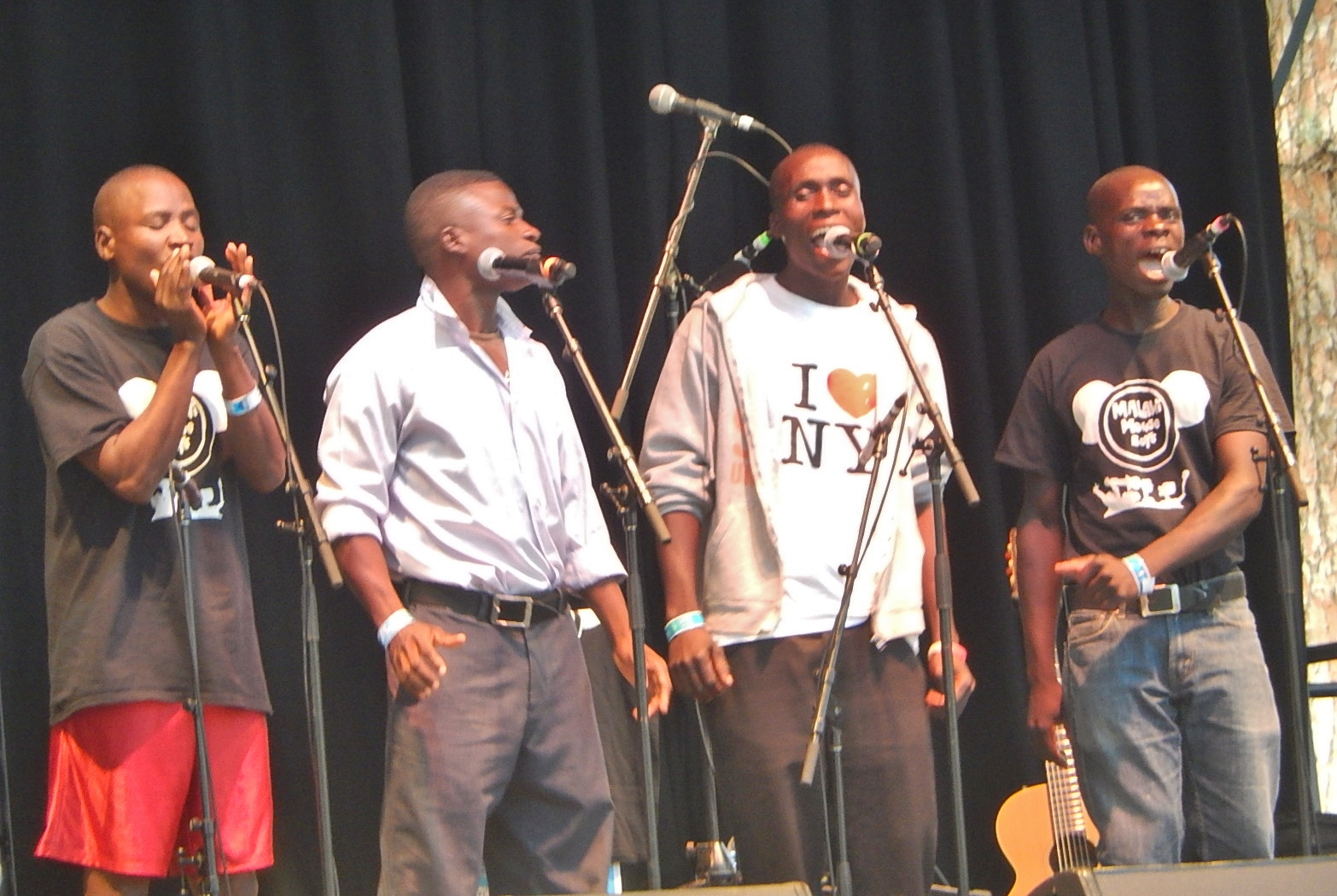
- Malawi Mouse Boys at WOMADelaide in 2015

Background information
- Origin: Malawi

Malawi Mouse Boys are a Malawian band. They have released four albums, and performed internationally in Europe, Australia, and the United States.

== History ==
Malawi Mouse Boys are named for their work while not making music, which is selling the Malawian delicacy of skewered mouse. Ian Brennan came across the band in 2011, and produced their first album He is #1, released in 2012. Several of the songs on the album are about Jesus Christ. It was the first album sung in Chichewa to be released outside of Malawi. Writing for BBC Music, David Katz described the album as "rough around the edges, which keeps everything a bit more real." The Times compared the album to the music of the Blind Boys of Alabama, and praised the vocals of Zondiwe Kachingwe. In the New York Times, Jon Pareles wrote that "The guitars don't stay in tune, but the voices do. They're remarkably steady and resolute".

In 2013 Malawi Mouse Boys played at WOMAD. Their second album Dirt is Good was released in 2014, and Songlines described it as "Afro-reggae gospel, bare-boned and scrappy".

Malawi Mouse Boys' third album Forever is 4 You was released in 2016, and was less well-received than its predecessors. Songlines wrote that "the general delivery is rickety in the extreme". Brennan described the sound as "more experimental" than their previous albums.

== Albums ==
- He is #1 (2012, Independent Records)
- Dirt is Good (2014, IRL Records)
- Forever is 4 You (2016, IRL Records)
- Score for a film about Malawi without music from Malawi (2018)
