= Ian Brennan (music producer) =

American record producer (born 1966)

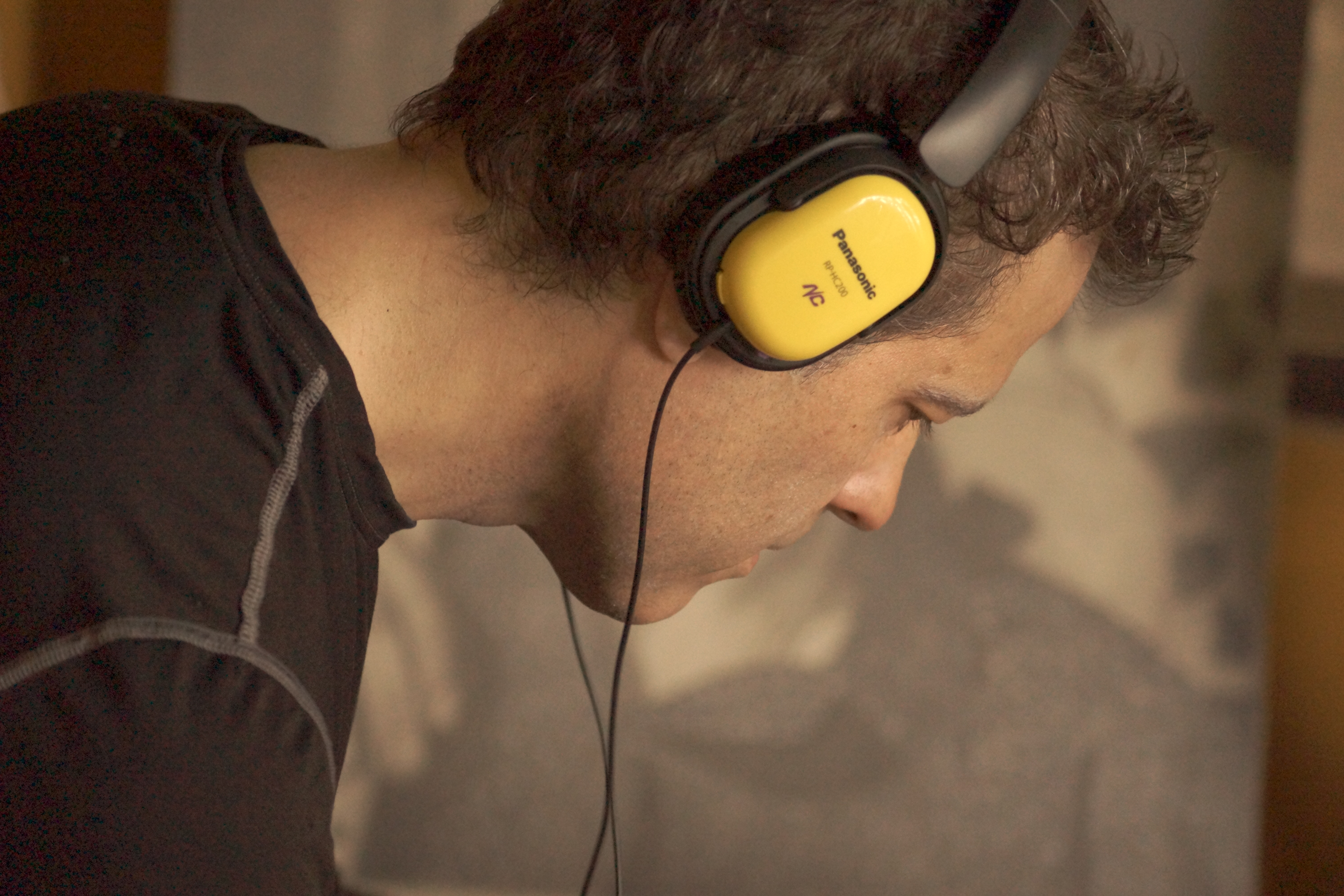
- Brennan recording in Cambodia in 2015

Background information
- Born: June 15, 1966 (age 60); Oakland, California, U.S.
- Occupations: Record producer; author; lecturer
- Years active: 1987–present
- Labels: Toy Gun Murder, Glitterbeat, Six Degrees Records, Anti-, Sub Pop, Sublime Frequencies
- Spouse: Marilena Umuhoza Delli
- Website: ianbrennan.com

Ian Brennan (/aɪˈən/; born June 15, 1966) is an American music producer.

Of the albums he has produced, Tinariwen's Tassili (2011) won a Grammy Award for Best World Music Album and Zomba Prison Project (2015) was nominated; and Ramblin' Jack Elliott's I Stand Alone (2006) and Peter Case's Let Us Now Praise Sleepy John (2007) were nominated for Grammy Award for Best Traditional Folk Album.

Brennan has authored eight books, three on anger, Anger Antidotes (2011), Hate-less (2014), and Peace by Peace: 99 Steps Toward Violence Prevention and De-escalation (2025); a novella, Sister Maple Syrup Eyes (2015); and four on music, How Music Dies [or Lives] (2016), Silenced by Sound (2019), Muse-Sick (2021), and Missing Music: voices from where the dirt roads end (2024). Brennan travels in search of countries and languages whose music is under-represented internationally, making field recordings of musicians and producing albums of their work. He started out making nine albums of his own music, and hosting benefits, producing live recordings and releasing compilation albums of local bands in San Francisco.

== Early life ==
Brennan was born in Oakland, California to James Brennan, a railroad engineer, and Marilyn Brennan, a nurse from a tiny town in eastern Kansas. He grew up on the Pleasant Hill border in the same suburban home his entire life. He and his older brother and sister have a mere two-and-one-half-year span between the three of them. This is due in part to his sister, who is the middle child, being born more than two months premature with Down syndrome.

At age five, he began playing drums and switched to guitar at age 6, which he taught himself to play.

== Career ==
=== San Francisco Bay Area ===
At age 20, he self-released his first solo album and went on to produce eight more. He reflects now that he was his "own worst enemy" and made some of the "most horrible albums possible" due to his obsessive-compulsive, autocratic approach.

Beginning in 1996, for five years he hosted a free, mostly acoustic music show in a San Francisco laundromat. He would perform solo and feature a different local band each week. He documented the shows as field recordings and these resulted in three Unscrubbed compilation albums in 1997–1999.

Brennan also regularly organized benefit shows for social and/or political causes during this period with artists such as Merle Haggard and Kris Kristofferson. Most notably he presented Fugazi, Vic Chesnutt, and Sleater-Kinney for free in Mission Dolores Park to honor the 20th anniversary of Food Not Bombs in 2000, as well as staging Green Day and The Blind Boys of Alabama for free in front of the steps of San Francisco's City Hall on the Sunday before George W. Bush's election as President, also in 2000.

He received two Grammy Award nominations for producing albums in the traditional folk category (Ramblin' Jack Elliott's I Stand Alone in 2006, and Peter Case's Let Us Now Praise Sleepy John in 2007). The Ramblin' Jack record features Lucinda Williams and members of Wilco, X, Los Lobos, and the Red Hot Chili Peppers.

=== International work ===
In 2009, he and his wife, the Italian-Rwandan filmmaker, photographer, and author, Marilena Umuhoza Delli, began traveling the world in search of countries and languages that were underrepresented internationally. Amongst others, this has resulted in releases from Rwanda, Malawi, South Sudan, Cambodia, Djibouti, Tanzania, Romania, Comoros, Pakistan, Vietnam, from within Kibera in Nairobi, Kenya and most notably from inside Zomba Central Prison in Malawi.

In 2011, he won a Grammy Award for the Tuareg band, Tinariwen's Tassili album, which was recorded live in the southeast Algerian desert just months before the Arab Spring erupted and war swept through the area. The album also includes members of TV on the Radio, the Dirty Dozen Brass Band, and guitarist Nels Cline.

In 2015, he gained a nomination for Grammy Award for Best World Music Album for Zomba Prison Project, the story of which was covered around the world including on the front-page of The New York Times and by the television program 60 Minutes with Anderson Cooper reporting. The segment won the Emmy Award for Outstanding Feature Story and was nominated for two other Emmys.

Brennan has also produced many of filmmaker, John Waters' live comedy shows since 2001 at venues such as The Fillmore in San Francisco and the Royal Festival Hall in London, as well as at festivals including Coachella, Bumbershoot, and Bonnaroo. Brennan has created pairings for Waters such as with Jonathan Richman, evangelist Tammy Faye Bakker, Peaches, and Wanda Jackson.

Brennan has spoken about music at the Smithsonian Museum, the Grammy Museum, the University of London, The New School (New York), the Berklee College of Music, Ca' Foscari University of Venice, the WOMEX conference, the Le Guess Who? festival in The Netherlands, Peter Gabriel's WOMAD Festival (UK), the Society for the Neuroscience of Creativity, the Audio Engineering Society (AES), the San Francisco Conservatory of Music, and WOMADelaide in Australia.

=== Production style ===
Brennan is known for his fly on the wall style of production and is often compared to Alan Lomax. He states that relationships and emotion are what interests him, not technology. He often prefers to work with those who have no previous musical experience and hearing from historically persecuted populations. He advocates for embracing imperfection as a partner and prefers to record outdoors and 100% live, without any overdubs.

=== Mental health background ===
At age 20, in need of a way to support himself, he began working in locked psychiatric hospitals as a counselor. He continued to do so for another fifteen years in psychiatric emergency rooms in Oakland and Richmond, California.

In 1993 he was asked to develop a curriculum and teach his co-workers in verbal de-escalation at East Bay Hospital in Richmond. This request was based on his having regularly demonstrated skill at de-fusing emotionally charged and violent situations. Through word of mouth, he began teaching full-time at hospitals, clinics, jails and schools in the San Francisco Bay Area and greater California. This teaching eventually led him around the country and then the world, having now taught in Africa, Southeast Asia, Europe, Australia, and the Middle East, at such places as University of California, Berkeley, the Betty Ford Center, and the National Accademia of Science (Rome).

=== Political activism ===
Brennan has worked to establish a memorial for those who have died from homelessness in San Francisco. The installations were unanimously approved by the Board Of Supervisors, but later stalled due to opposition from the Mayors Office and the Chamber of Commerce. In the fall of 2019, Brennan produced a "sonic memorial" album featuring voices and songs from the homeless community of West Oakland.

Brennan wrote a piece in May 2019 for the Chicago Tribune criticizing the racist and misogynistic lyrics of The Rolling Stones', "Brown Sugar", and calling for the band to cease playing it live. In October 2021, the band announced that they were retiring the song from their performance repertoire. Brennan's piece was widely cited as a reference in this decision.

=== Writing ===
At age 19, Brennan's poetry was published for the first time in an anthology (Fineline Thunder) curated by his adult-school creative writing workshop instructor, Betty Solomon. He was published again that same year in the Berkeley poetry journal, Agape.

He has written about music for The Guardian, NPR, Guitar Player, Sound on Sound, Chicago Tribune, CounterPunch. BOMB, Pollstar, Modern Drummer, American Songwriter, Talkhouse, Huck, Songlines, The Quietus, No Depression (magazine), The Vinyl District, Afropop Worldwide, Quincy Jones' Qwest TV, Fretboard Journal, SonicScoop, Perceptive Travel, Flood Magazine, Zero, and Tape Op.

In 2011, he published a book on anger, Anger Antidotes. A follow-up, Hate-less, was issued in 2014.

In 2015, his semi-autobiographical novella, Sister Maple Syrup Eyes, was published, after working on drafts of it for over 25 years. It deals with the aftermath of the sexual assault of a partner, a trauma he experienced at age 21. Readers+Writers journal praised it, "A beautiful book. Achingly beautiful." And Louder Than War states it is, "….alive with the energy of an eye-witness." Small Press Picks noted, "In vividly re-creating Kristian's personal journey, Brennan offers a layered and moving exploration of the truth…"

His fourth book was How Music Dies (or Lives): Field-recording and the Battle For Democracy in the Arts. In it he explores concerns related to the continuing domination of English language media across the planet, and details how recording technology can lead to more lifeless results as well as centralization of content. LargeHearted Boy calls it "…one of the most thought-provoking books on modern music that I have ever read."

His fifth book, Silenced by Sound: the Music Meritocracy Myth, was published in the fall of 2019.

In 2020, Brennan co-authored Negretta: Baci Razzisti with his wife, Marilena Umuhoza Delli. The book is based on Delli's life growing-up in Italy's most conservative region with an immigrant mother from Rwanda.

Brennan has hosted book events with the disability rights activist Judith E. Heumann (featured in the Academy Award nominated documentary Crip Camp); tech visionary Jaron Lanier; David Harrington (Kronos Quartet); feminist scholar Silvia Federici; Ted Hughes Award winning, deaf poet, Raymond Antrobus; crime novelist Gary Phillips (writer); and music producer Joe Boyd (Nick Drake, Billy Bragg, Toots and the Maytals).

Muse-Sick: a music manifesto in fifty-nine notes, was published by PM Press in October 2021.

In 2023, Brennan co-authored another Italian language book, Pizza Mussolini, with Marilena Umuhoza Delli.

Missing Music: stories from where the dirt roads end, was published in March 2024 with PM Press.

His latest book is Peace by Peace: 99 Steps Toward Violence Prevention & De-escalation, published in January 2025.

== Publications ==
=== Publications by Brennan ===
- Anger Antidotes: How Not to Lose Your S#&!. New York City: W. W. Norton & Company, 2011. ISBN 978-0-393-70705-2.
- Hate-less: Violence Prevention & How To Make Friends With A F&#!ed Up World. Toy Gun Murder, 2014. ISBN 9781311823069.
- Sister Maple Syrup Eyes. New York City: Pleasure Boat Studio, 2015. ISBN 9780912887333. A novella.
- How Music Dies (or Lives): Field-recording and the Battle For Democracy in the Arts. New York City: Allworth Press, 2016. ISBN 978-1621534877. With a foreword by Corin Tucker.
- Silenced by Sound: the Music Meritocracy Myth PM Press, 2019 ISBN 978-1629637037. With a foreword by Tunde Adebimpe.
- Muse-Sick: a music manifesto in fifty-nine notes PM Press, 2021 ISBN 978-1629639093. With a foreword by John Waters.
- Missing Music: voices from where the dirt roads end PM Press, 2024 ISBN 979-8887440378. With a foreword by Evelyn Glennie.
- Peace by Peace: 99 Steps Toward Violence Prevention & De-escalation PM Press, 2025 ISBN 979-8887440880.

=== Publications with others ===
- Fineline Thunder: Work by the Devil Mountain Poets. Walnut Creek, CA: Devil Mountain Books, 1986. ISBN 978-0915685042. With poems by Brennan and others.
- Negretta: Baci Razzisti. Rome, Italy: Red Star Press, 2020. ISBN 978-8867182480. with Marilena Delli Umuhoza (Italian language work).
- Pizza Mussolini. Rome, Italy: Red Star Press, 2023. ISBN 978-8867183753. with Marilena Delli Umuhoza (Italian language work).

== Discography ==
=== Albums by Brennan ===
- Ian Brennan (Toy Gun Murder, 1987)
- One Last Kiss (Toy Gun Murder, 1988)
- Twisting by the Pool (Toy Gun Murder, 1988)
- One Sided Stories, Ian Brennan and the Faith Healers (Toy Gun Murder, 1990)
- Stuff (Toy Gun Murder, 1992)
- Paperboy (Toy Gun Murder, 1994)
- Cheapskate (Toy Gun Murder, 1996)
- Teacher's Pet (Toy Gun Murder, 1998)
- Mail-Order Brides (Toy Gun Murder, 2000)
- Sometimes It Just Takes That Long: 1987–2015 (Independent Records Ltd [IRL], 2016)
- Silenced by Sound: the Music Meritocracy Myth, spoken-word release (PM Press, January 2021)

=== Compilation albums recorded and released by Brennan ===
Acoustic performances at Brainwash Laundromat in San Francisco recorded live by Brennan.

- Unscrubbed: Live From The Laundromat, various artists (Toy Gun Murder, 1997) featuring poet Justin Chin, Eric McFadden
- Unscrubbed: Live From The Laundromat II, various artists (Toy Gun Murder, 1998) featuring Henry Kaiser (musician), Chuck Prophet, Omar Sosa
- Unscrubbed: Live From The Laundromat III, various artists (Toy Gun Murder, 1999) featuring Grandaddy, Ralph Carney, Tribe 8

=== Singles produced by Brennan ===
- Why [the War]?, Yemen War Refugees (Toy Gun Murder, 2020) – Yemen
- Soccer (Summer 1988), The Good Ones (Anti-, September 2020)
- Albinism Unity (We Are Still Living In a Troubled World), Tanzania Albinism Collective (Six Degrees Records, June 2021)
- I'm So Tired of Evil, Malawi Mouse Boys (Toy Gun Murder, August 2021) – Malawi
- Death Can Come at Any Time, fra fra (Glitterbeat Records, February 2022) - Ghana
- Abnoy (Don't Call Me Names), Sheltered Workshop Singers (Toy Gun Murder Records, March 2022)
- The Smallest Country in the World (We Are Ancient), Comorian (Glitterbeat Records, June 2022) - Comoros
- In Memory of a Hungry Child, Malawi Mouse Boys (Toy Gun Murder Records, September 2022)
- Peace to All, Ustad Saami (Glitterbeat Records, September 2022) - Pakistan
- It's in the Book, John Waters (Sub Pop Records, December 2022) homage to 1950s comedian Johnny Standley
- I Look For You Everywhere, Comorian (Toy Gun Murder Records, January 2023)
- This Amazing Love Has Stayed With Me, The Good Ones (Six Degrees Records, February 2023)
- Billionaires in Space, Witch Camp [Ghana] (Six Degrees Records, May 2023)
- Djibouti Desert (Listen to Me), Yanna Momina (Toy Gun Murder Records, July 2023)
- One Mother, Two Hearts, Saramaccan Sound [Suriname] (Glitterbeat Records, July 2023)
- Umuhoza, the Worst Days Are Over, The Good Ones (Toy Gun Murder Records, July 2024)
- It's a Punk Rock Christmas, John Waters (Sub Pop Records, November 2024)
- John Waters covers ‘Little Cindy,’ John Waters (Sub Pop Records, November 2025)

=== Albums produced by Brennan ===
- I Stand Alone, Ramblin' Jack Elliott (Anti-, 2006)
- Let Us Now Praise Sleepy John, Peter Case (Yep Roc Records, 2007)
- Rain Machine, Rain Machine (Anti-, 2009)
- Kigali Y' Izahabu, The Good Ones (Dead Oceans Records, 2010) – Rwanda
- Tassili, by Tinariwen (Anti-, 2011) – Mali/Algeria
- He Is #1, Malawi Mouse Boys (IRL, 2012) – Malawi
- Italia 1988–2012, Jovanotti (ATO Records, 2012)
- Trance Percussion Masters of South Sudan, Wayo (Riverboat, 2013) – Zande people
- South Sudan Street Survivors, General Paolino featuring Mama Celina (IRL, 2013) – South Sudan
- Little Copper Still, The Cedars (Clubhouse Records, 2013) – Scotland/South Africa/Portugal
- Lapwong (Freedom Fighters), Acholi Machon (IRL, 2014) – Acholi
- Dirt is Good, Malawi Mouse Boys (IRL, 2014)
- I Have No Everything Here, Zomba Prison Project (Six Degrees Records, 2015) – Malawi
- Survival Songs, Bob Forrest (Six Degrees Records, 2015) – Big Sur
- War is a Wound, Peace is a Scar, Hanoi Masters (Glitterbeat, 2015) – Vietnam
- Kibera Esbera [Kenya], West Bridge Band (Electric Cowbell Records, 2015) – Kibera, Nairobi, Kenya
- Rwanda is My Home, The Good Ones (IRL, 2015) – Rwanda
- Quaranta [40], Canzoniere Grecanico Salentino (Ponderosa Music & Art, 2015) – Apulia, Italy
- Like a Bird or Spirit, Not a Face, Sainkho Namtchylak (Ponderosa Music & Art, 2015) – Tuva; Brennan also plays on the album
- They Will Kill You, If You Cry, Khmer Rouge Survivors (Glitterbeat, 2016) – Cambodia
- Rough Romanian Soul, Zmei3 (Six Degrees Records, 2016) – Romania
- Forever Is 4 You, Malawi Mouse Boys (Omnivore Recordings, 2016)
- I Will Not Stop Singing, Zomba Prison Project (Six Degrees Records, 2016)
- Why Did We Stop Growing Tall?, Abatwa [The Pygmy] (Glitterbeat, 2017) – Twa people, Rwanda/Burundi
- White African Power, Tanzania Albinism Collective (Six Degrees Records, 2017) – Tanzania
- Make Trouble, John Waters (Third Man Records, 2017)
- Our Skin May Be Different, But Our Blood is the Same, Tanzania Albinism Collective (Six Degrees Records, 2018) – Tanzania
- Score for a film about Malawi without music from Malawi, Malawi Mouse Boys (Toy Gun Murder, 2018)
- God is not a terrorist, Ustad Saami (Glitterbeat Records, January 2019) – Pakistan
- Not a homeless person, just a person without a home, Homeless Oakland Heart (Electric Cowbell Records, October 2019)
- Rwanda, You Should Be Loved, The Good Ones (Anti-, November 2019)
- Funeral Songs, fra fra (Glitterbeat Records, April 2020) – Ghana
- Who You Calling Slow?, Sheltered Workshop Singers (Toy Gun Murder, September 2020)
- Pakistan is for the peaceful, Ustad Saami (Glitterbeat, October 2020) – Karachi
- I've Forgotten Now Who I Used to Be, Witch Camp [Ghana] (Six Degrees Records, March 2021)
- Prayer to Pasolini, John Waters (Sub Pop Records, April 2021) – recorded onsite in Italy
- We are an island, but we're not alone, Comorian (Glitterbeat Records, May 2021) – Comoros
- Sons of South Sudan, Acholi Machon (Good Deeds Music, July 2021) – South Sudan
- East Pakistan Sky, Ustad Saami (Glitterbeat Records, October 2021) - Pakistan
- A Lifetime Isn't Long Enough, War Women of Kosovo (Toy Gun Murder, February 2022) - Kosovo
- Rwanda...you see ghosts, I see sky, The Good Ones (Six Degrees Records, April 2022) - Rwanda
- Afar Ways, Yanna Momina (Glitterbeat Records, August 2022) - Djibouti
- The First Time I Wore Hearing Aids, Raymond Antrobus (Toy Gun Murder, September 2022)
- Where water meets water: Bird Songs & lullabies, Sainkho Namtchylak (Ponderosa Music & Art, March 2023)
- Thank you for bringing me back to the sky, The Oldest Voice in the World [Azerbaijan] (Six Degrees Records, April 2023) - Talysh people
- Our Language May Be Dying, But Our Voices Remain (Botswana), Taa! (Glitterbeat Records, June 2023) - Taa language
- An Investigator (of Missing Sounds), Raymond Antrobus (Toy Gun Murder, 2023)
- Some Mississippi Sunday Morning, Parchman Prison Prayer (Glitterbeat, 2023) - Mississippi State Penitentiary
- Where the River Bends Is Only the Beginning, Saramaccan Sound [Suriname] (Glitterbeat, January 2024) - Suriname
- Ancestor Sounds, Africatown AL (Free Dirt/PM Press, February 2024) - Africatown
- Once We Had a Place Called Home, Rohingya Refugees (Toy Gun Murder, April 2024) - Rohingya people
- Your Face Is Like the Moon, Your Eyes Are Stars, Bhutan Balladeers (Glitterbeat, June 2024) - Bhutan
- Another Noise, Raymond Antrobus & Evelyn Glennie (Toy Gun Murder, August 2024)
- Our Ancestors Swam to Shore, N’golá (São Tomé) (Free Dirt/PM Press, September 2024) - São Tomé e Príncipe
- Another Mississippi Sunday Morning, Parchman Prison Prayer (Glitterbeat, January 2025)
- For Those Left Behind, Famo Mountain (Glitterbeat, April 2025) - Lesotho
- The World Stood By, Tigray Tears (Toy Gun Murder, June 2025) - Tigrayans
- Aloud, Raymond Antrobus & Evelyn Glennie (Toy Gun Murder, August 2025)
- Rwanda Sings With Strings, The Good Ones (Glitterbeat, August 2025)
- They Shall Take Up Serpents, West Virginia Snake Handler Revival (Sublime Frequencies, October 2025)
- The Forgotten Parts, Chicago Gunfire Survivors (Toy Gun Murder, February 2026)
- Ghosts of Namibia's Skeleton Coast, Himba Hymn (Sublime Frequencies, May 2026) - Namibia
- Songs of Returning and Leaving, Oman Bagpipe Singers (Glitterbeat Records, July 2026) - Oman
- Land of the Sun (Ute Nation Utah), Red Spirit Singers (Toy Gun Murder Records, August 2026) - Ute people

== Awards and nominations ==
- 2006: Ramblin Jack Elliott's I Stand Alone nominated for a Grammy Award for Best Traditional Folk Album
- 2007: Peter Case's Let Us Now Praise Sleepy John nominated for a Grammy Award for Best Traditional Folk Album
- 2011: Tinariwen's Tassili won a Grammy Award for Best World Music Album
- 2015: Zomba Prison Project's I Have No Everything Here nominated for a Grammy Award for Best World Music Album
- 2017: Khmer Rouge Survivors' They Will Kill You, If You Cry nominated for a Songlines Music Award, Best Asian Album category
- 2017: Brennan's How Music Dies (or Lives) nominated for Association for Recorded Sound Collections Award, Best Historical Research in Recorded Folk, Roots, or World Music category
- 2020: Ustad Saami's God is not a terrorist nominated for a Songlines Music Award, Best Asian Album category
- 2021: Ustad Saami's Pakistan is for the peaceful nominated for a Songlines Music Award, Best Asian Album category
- 2022: Ustad Saami's east Pakistan sky won Songlines Music Award, Best Asia & Pacific Album category
- 2024: Bhutan Balladeer's Your face is like the moon, your eyes are stars nominated for a Songlines Music Award, Best Asia & Pacific Album category
- 2025: Parchman Prison Prayer's Another Mississippi Sunday Morning nominated for a Songlines Music Award, Best US & Canada album category
- 2026: Parchman Prison Prayer's Another Mississippi Sunday Morning nominated at the Libera Awards, Best Spiritual Album category
