= Carlos Guitarlos =

American guitarist (born 1950)

Carlos Guitarlos (born Carlos Daniel Ayala, March 18, 1950) is an American guitarist. He first gained attention in Top Jimmy & The Rhythm Pigs. The Encyclopedia of Popular Music remarked of Guitarlos that his career in music "has taken in cult stardom in Los Angeles, alcoholism, homelessness, and an unexpected return to recording in the new millennium."

== Early life ==
As a 2003 feature in the Los Angeles Times recounted, Ayala grew up "in the northeast Los Angeles community of Cypress Park. He talked his mother into buying him a guitar at 10, and learned the basics from an older brother. He had a good ear." The article's author, journalist Bob Baker, quoted Carlos: "By the time I was 13, I could play anything I could hear."

== Career ==
Baker went on to describe how, after graduating from Marshall High, Ayala "played in some undistinguished bands and spent most of his 20s living at home, writing songs and practicing."

The narrative continued, "In 1980, at age 30, he got a job as a doorman at the downtown Hong Kong Café, working with his guitar strapped around his neck." It was there that he met James "Top Jimmy" Koncek. "A musician both men knew...introduced the doorman as 'Carlos Guitarlos,' and it stuck."

=== With Top Jimmy & The Rhythm Pigs ===
This rock and R&B band emerged in 1980 from the Los Angeles punk/roots music scene. Music writer Chris Morris—whose work has included many reminiscences about Koncek & Co.—dubbed them "L.A. punk's house band." As lead guitarist, Ayala was the key component of the group that backed frontman Top Jimmy. In a chapter that he contributed to the L.A. punk history More Fun in the New World, Morris described the pair as "imposing, loud, heavy-drinking, and talented."

During their heyday in the early 1980s, Top Jimmy & The Rhythm Pigs attracted many famous guest stars to their gigs. One of the big names who joined the group on stage was Tom Waits. As a result, Carlos Guitarlos played on two tracks of the 1983 Waits album Swordfishtrombones.

However, Top Jimmy & The Rhythm Pigs slowly crumbled. Internal volatility, fueled by Ayala, was a major reason. Morris noted that Ayala was "truculent...frequently deranged."

=== As a homeless busker ===
As Morris went on to chronicle, in 1988, an "increasingly erratic" Ayala followed his estranged wife and daughter to San Francisco. An undiagnosed case of diabetes worsened his problems. He wound up homeless in the Mission District, playing for change in the streets. No Depression magazine described how "as a street musician, Guitarlos used to display a sign that read 'Will Play for Fame or Fortune.'" Yet his talent was still visible: Bob Baker noted that the San Francisco Bay Guardian named Ayala "Best Street Musician" in a 1994 survey.

=== Comeback ===
According to Baker, Ayala "had sworn off alcohol and drugs" after Koncek died in 2001. After landing "in a hospital...being treated for congestive heart failure" two months later, he turned his life around with the help of a nephew. He proceeded to put out the Mission Blues album that year.

In April 2003, Baker caught up with Carlos. A feature article, "The Ballad of Carlos Guitarlos", started on that day's front page. It described how Ayala, then living in a $35-a-day residence hotel room, was playing at a BART plaza in the Mission District with "unmistakably sophisticated" technique and "an old gravelly blues voice, perfectly cracked." Baker wondered, "Who is this? What is a guy with these chops doing here?" He then unfolded the guitarist's back story.

A second album, Straight from the Heart (2003), followed. It was recorded with friends and fellow members of the L.A. punk scene: John Doe, Mike Watt, and Dave Alvin. No Depression observed that the record "fully demonstrates his guitar-playing and songwriting skills" in multiple styles. The Times of London called it "a roots-rock masterpiece."

Ayala traveled to England in 2004 and 2005 for performances, attracting featured press coverage.

His third album, Hell Can Wait, came out in 2005. Guests included David Hidalgo, Marcy Levy, and Gene Taylor.

In 2007, he guested on Let Us Now Praise Sleepy John by Peter Case.

=== Ongoing activity ===
In 2014, KCET.org posted another feature about the musician called "The Legend of Carlos Guitarlos." It focused on him at home in Highland Park on his 64th birthday. He was playing as part of the Carlos Guitarlos Trio and had self-released a 2010 album, The Innocent Remains.

The feature's author, Nathan Solis, spoke with Ayala's former bandmate with The Rhythm Pigs, Richard Aeilts (a.k.a. Dig the Pig). Aeilts noted that Ayala had mellowed to a degree and offered a succinct description: "a sensitive soul buried within a hardscrabble Highland Park Chicano who doesn't speak Spanish."

== Discography ==
| Year | Album |
|---|---|
| 2001 | Mission Blues |
| 2003 | Straight from the Heart |
| 2005 | Hell Can Wait |
