= Mzimba Prison =

Prison in Malawi, Africa

Coordinates: 11°31′S 33°30′E

- Interactive map of Mzimba Prison
- Location: Mzimba, Malawi
- Status: Operational
- Security class: Maximum (male and female)
- Capacity: 574
- Managed by: Malawi Prison Service

Mzimba Prison is a Malawian prison located in Mzimba District, Northern Region.

== History ==
The prison has a 500-hectare farm in Kamwanjiwa, Mzimba district, and for the 2023–2024 farming season, the prison cultivated 20 hectares of land, where it grew crops such as maize, soya, beans, sunflowers and cowpeas.

=== Location ===
Mzimba Prison is located next to Mtambalika Moyo in Mzimba District. The prison has a length of 0.71 kilometres.

== Facilities ==
The prison has a farm that is expected to feed over 1,000 inmates. It has beds and mattresses. Prisoners get food three times a day and the facility has ventilated cells. The facility also provides services and activities for prisoners, such as teaching them skills, so they go back into society as law-abiding citizens.

== Capacity ==
The prison is home to about 574 prisoners.
