= Zomba Prison Project =

I Have No Everything Here

Compilation album by Various Artists
- Released: 2015
- Recorded: Zomba, Malawi
- Venue: Zomba Central Prison
- Studio: Mixed at Studio Black Box (France)
- Genre: World music
- Languages: Chichewa, English
- Label: Six Degrees Records
- Producer: Ian Brennan

Zomba Prison Project is a recording featuring music composed and performed by prisoners at the maximum-security Zomba Central Prison in Zomba, Malawi. The album I Have No Everything Here was produced by Ian Brennan, and nominated in the 2016 Grammy Award for Best World Music Album.

== Recording ==
Zomba Central Prison is an overcrowded maximum-security institution located in Zomba, the former capital city of Malawi. According to data gathered from the World Bank, Malawi ranked as one of the poorest countries in the world in 2015 based on the country's GDP per capita. The prison in which the recordings took place was constructed during the era of British colonial rule with an intended capacity of 340 people. The facility has become a dilapidated brick structure, that now often holds over 2,000 prisoners.

In August 2013, producer Ian Brennan (USA) and his wife documentary filmmaker Marilena Umuhoza Delli (Italy) travelled to southern Malawi to record the music of the male and female inmates at Zomba. Brennan and Delli were granted time with the prisoners, partially in exchange for offering courses on conflict resolution and violence prevention, topics about which Brennan has published four books and, since 1993, lectured on around the world. The recording took place over 10 days and involved the participation of prisoners serving sentences for crimes ranging from double-murder to theft to more controversial and questionable charges related to acts of homosexuality - which remains a punishable crime in Malawi - and accusations of "witchcraft".

The recordings were captured at various locations throughout the facility. Recordings of the men were made near an auto shop and woodmill at the prison while the women were recorded outdoors - in their yard area and on a front porch. The project documented over six hours of recorded music, involving over sixty individuals, including the participation of a few prison guards. Brennan engineered all the tracks himself, without the use of overdubs or effects, using a battery-operated portable studio. The record was later mixed by Irishman David Odlum at his Studio Black Box in rural France.

The completed album is a collection of 20 tracks featuring 16 singer-songwriters from within the prison, sung mostly in the Chichewa language. Though some of the tracks are by solo members of the prison's organized men's band, neither the band itself nor the band leader are featured on the album. The released recordings focus on those who did not consider themselves to be singers and/or songwriters, with the majority of the tracks coming from the women's side of the prison and from individuals who wrote songs specifically for the project. The completed album was released in 2015 by Six Degrees Records.

A portion of funds raised by the project have gone towards legal representation for some of the prisoners involved in the recordings. Since the beginning of the project, three female prisoners have had their cases reviewed and been released. At the time of the Grammy Award nomination, two more cases were under appeal but encountering delays in the appeal process that have persisted for more than two years. The project has helped raise awareness around the plight of those imprisoned at Zomba, from the inefficiency of the bureaucratic appeal process to the incarceration of infants born within the facility.

Brennan and Delli returned to the prison twice more in 2016 to compile a new album titled I Will Not Stop Singing.

== Reception ==
Upon news of its Grammy Award nomination, Zomba Prison Project I Have No Everything Here received extensive worldwide press coverage and further positive critical acclaim. The recordings were characterized as highly personal and giving voice to an underrepresented social group. It has been likened to recordings made by John and Alan Lomax at the Mississippi State Penitentiary Parchman Farm and joins the body of work of "jail music" that includes albums by artists such as the Sex Pistols, Big Mama Thornton, Leadbelly, B.B. King and Johnny Cash. The nomination of the album I Have No Everything Here marks the first time a Malawian artist's work has been nominated for a Grammy Award.

The story was covered around the world including on the front-page of The New York Times and by the television program 60 Minutes with Anderson Cooper reporting. The segment won the Emmy Award for Outstanding Feature Story and was nominated for two other Emmys.

In Expresso, Portugal's largest weekly paper, João Santos wrote, "In twenty songs, there is not one that is not corrupted by circumstances. And none is less than crucial."

The Irish Times' Jim Carroll called I Have No Everything Here "glorious songs from behind bars in Malawi" and named it one of his top 30 albums of the year.

NPR's Betto Arcos praised the album as, "One of the most exciting projects I've heard."

== Track listing ==
No.	Title	Length
1.	"Listen to Me (or I Will Kick Your Ass)" (written & sung by Chikondi Salanje)	2:45
2.	"Women Today Take Care of Business" (written & sung by Stefano Nyerenda)	2:18
3.	"Please, Don't Kill My Child" (written & sung by Thomas Binamo)	4:51
4.	"A Message (I Will Take You)" (written & sung by Ben Masekese)	3:02
5.	"Jealous Neighbor" (written & sung by Elias Chimenya)	3:00
6.	"I See the Whole World Dying of AIDS" (written & sung by Officer Ines Kaunde)	2:37
7.	"Give Me Back My Child" (written & sung by Henderson Damiano)	0:52
8.	"The Floods" (written & sung by James Justin)	2:44
9.	"Taking My Life" (written & sung by Gladis Zinamo)	0:50
10.	"House of the Dance" (traditional, sung by Zomba Prison Women)	0:14
11.	"Don't Hate Me" (written & sung by Gladis Zinamo)	1:06
12.	"Prison of Sinners" (written & sung by Elube Chalema)	1:02
13.	"When They See Me Dance" (written & sung by Fronce Afiki)	0:36
14.	"Last Wishes" (written & sung by Irene Chibowa)	0:41
15.	"The Weary & the Burdened" (written & sung by Margareth Makoliga)	1:07
16.	"I Kill No More" (written & sung by Josephine Banda)	0:20
17.	"I Am Alone" (written & sung by Rhoda Mtemang'ombe)	1:54
18.	"Goodbye, All My Friends" (written & sung by Elube Mikayele)	0:29
19.	"Forgiveness" (written & sung by Elube Chalema)	0:44
20.	"Let's Go!!!" (written & sung by Fronce Afiki, with Gladis Zinamo)	0:44
