= Qwest TV =

Subscription video-on-demand music service

Qwest TV is a subscription video-on-demand (SVOD) service featuring jazz and other eclectic music, including classical, blues, and soul.

Qwest TV was created in 2017 by Quincy Jones and Reza Ackbaraly.

== History ==
=== Key dates ===
Reza Ackbaraly (member of the Charles Cros Academy, musical programmer of the Jazz à Vienne festival in France, La Petite Halle de la Villette concert hall in Paris, and (previously) Mezzo TV), met Quincy Jones in 2014. It was during this meeting that plans for Qwest TV were laid.

Qwest TV was officially introduced at the 51st Montreux Jazz Festival in July 2017.

In September 2017, a pre-subscription campaign was launched at a tribute concert for Jones at the Hollywood Bowl in Los Angeles.

The pre-subscription campaign was conducted via the crowdfunding platform Kickstarter.

In December 2017, a beta version of Qwest TV was officially launched.

In 2020, Qwest had three channels: Qwest TV Jazz & Beyond for blues, soul, and funk music, Qwest TV Mix, and Qwest TV Classical.

=== Origins of the name "Qwest TV" ===
In the 1980s, Quincy Jones created his own record label, Qwest Records, before co-founding Qwest Broadcasting, a media broadcasting company in the United States.

== Video catalog ==
The Qwest TV catalog features documentaries, concerts, archives, and exclusive content relating to "jazz and beyond", such as:

- Aretha Franklin's 1977 concert in Paris
- The ten-episode series The Sound of New York
- Classical music concerts recorded live around the globe, featuring well-known conductors and symphony orchestras, as well as solo piano recitals, chamber music, and small orchestras. These present music from the 17th through the 21st century.

Each jazz video is accompanied by liner notes written by a journalist specializing in that genre.
