= Marilena Umuhoza Delli =

Rwandan-Italian photographer, filmmaker, author

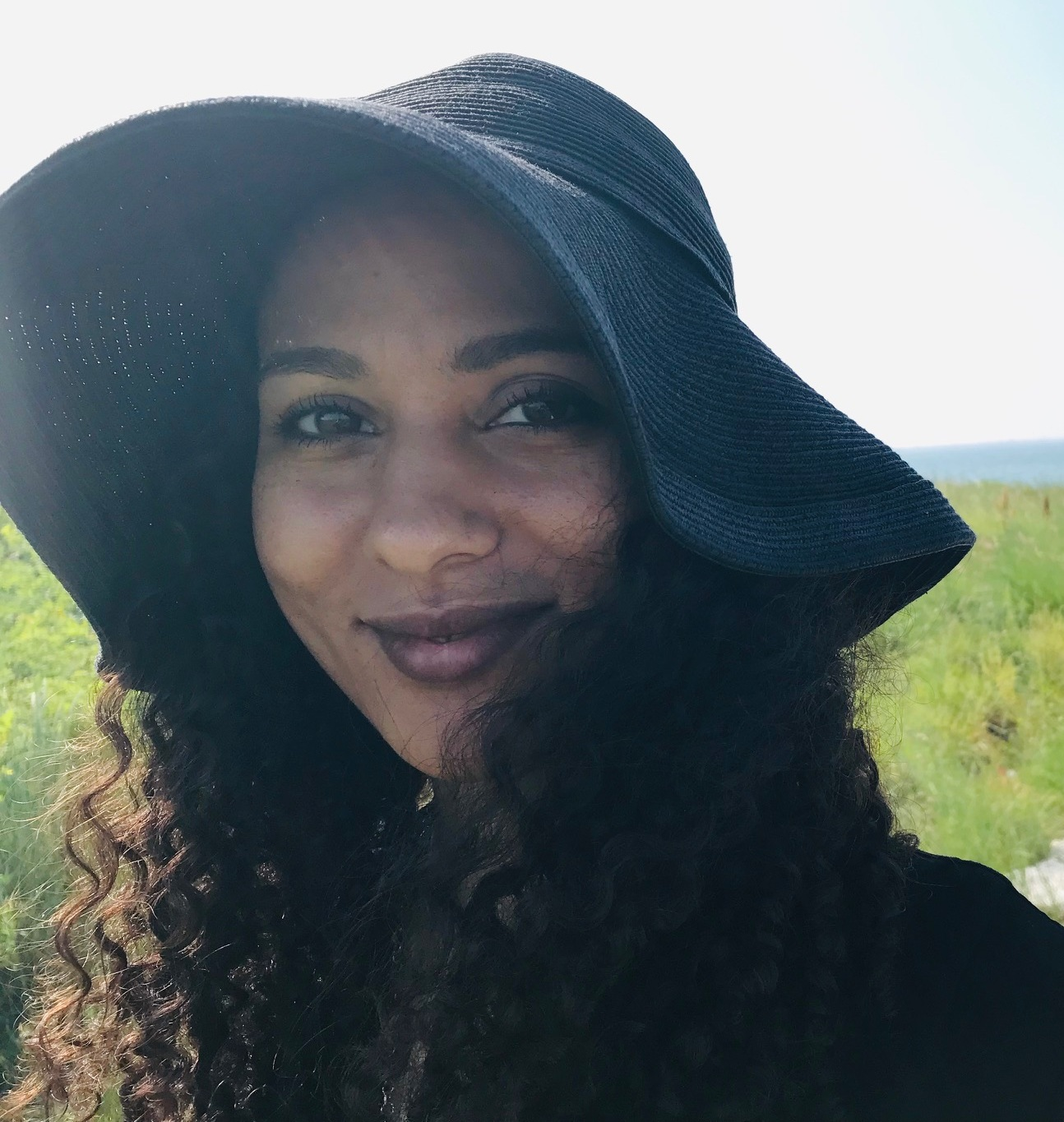
- Born: 3 May 1981 (age 45); Italy
- Education: Università degli Studi di Bergamo; University of California, Los Angeles
- Occupations: Photographer; Filmmaker; Author
- Years active: 2008–present
- Spouse: Ian Brennan
- Website: marilenadelli.com

Marilena Umuhoza Delli (born 3 May 1981) is a Rwandan-Italian photographer, filmmaker, radio presenter, and author. In 2020, she was named one of the "Top 50 Women of the Year" by La Repubblica.

== Early life and education ==
Marilena was born in Italy to her Italian father, Giovanni, from Bergamo and her mother, Myriam, who immigrated from Rwanda.

She holds a master's degree in ‘Language for International Communication' from Università degli Studi di Bergamo for which she wrote her thesis on ‘African Cinema.' Additionally, she studied filmmaking at the University of California, Los Angeles (UCLA).

== Work ==
=== Writing ===
In 2016, her first book, a memoir titled, Razzismo All'Italiana: Cronache Di Una Spia Mezzosangue (Racism Italian Style: Chronicles of a half-blood spy) was published by Aracne Editrice (Rome). In 2020, her second book, a novella titled, Negretta: Baci razzisti (Little Black Girl: Racist Kisses) was published by Rome's Red Star Press. Her third book, Pizza Mussolini, was published in 2023 and also her fourth book, Lettera di una madre afrodiscendente alla scuola italiana. Delli's fifth book, Storia vera dell'Italia nera. Gli afrodiscendenti che hanno fatto la Storia d'Italia, dall'impero romano a oggi was published in the fall of 2024. In Corriere della Sera's Sette (magazine), award-winning journalist, Gian Antonio Stella, wrote that Delli's writing is "tough and hilarious." il Manifesto states her work features "biting humor." She also has written for Vanity Fair magazine and Corriere della Sera, interviewing such major figures as best-selling author, Zadie Smith.

In September 2025, Delli published two different books: Chi ha paura del lupo bianco? C’era una volta il razzismo inconsapevole ("Who Is Afraid of the White Wolf?") and Rosa Parks che restò seduta ("Rosa Parks Remained Seated").

=== Photography ===
Delli's photographic work has been featured on the covers and artwork for over forty records by international music artists. Relatedly, her photos have been published by such publications as the New York Times, BBC, Los Angeles Times, Rolling Stone, and CNN. Bomb (magazine) and No Depression magazine both published multi-page features on Delli's work in their print editions.

=== Film ===
Delli's documentary film work has been shown at such festivals as Le Guess Who? Netherlands, Sole Luna Doc Film Festival in Sicily— where she also served on the jury— and WOMEX. Amongst other networks, her footage has been used on segments for PBS, ABC News, and CNN International television.

=== Radio ===
Since January 2021, Delli has curated and co-hosted the Afro Descendant Excellencies program on the national radio network, Radio Radicale. Gomorrah (book) author and winner of the PEN Pinter Prize and the European Book Prize, Roberto Saviano, cited Marilena and her program as a source in a feature for Corriere della Sera.

== Awards and commendation ==
In 2016, Delli provided all of the photos and film for the Zomba Prison Project, the first album of Malawian artists to ever receive a Grammy nomination. Delli's work has been exhibited at MUDEC (Museo delle Culture di Milano) Museum's permanent collection since 2021.

In 2020, Delli was named as one of Italy's Top 50 "Women of the Year" by the national Italian daily newspaper, La Repubblica. In 2023, she was nominated in the Community category for the Milan Fashion Week Black Carpet Awards sponsored by Vogue (magazine) and Afro Fashion Week.

In 2025, Marilena was a Premio Andersen award nominee finalist for her book, Storia vera dell'Italia nera. Gli afrodiscendenti che hanno fatto la Storia d'Italia, dall'impero romano a oggi.

== Books ==
- Razzismo All'Italiana: Cronache Di Una Spia Mezzosangue (Aracne Editrice [Roma], 2016). ISBN 978-8854890565 Preface by Cécile Kyenge.
- Negretta: Baci razzisti (Red Star Press [Roma], 2020) ISBN 978-8867182480 Afterword by Stella Jean.
- Pizza Mussolini (Red Star Press [Roma], 2023) ISBN 978-8867183753
- Lettera di una madre afrodiscendente alla scuola italiana (PEOPLE, 2023) ISBN 979-1259791924
- Storia vera dell'Italia nera. Gli afrodiscendenti che hanno fatto la Storia d'Italia, dall'impero romano a oggi (Edizioni Piemme, 2024) ISBN 978-8856697025
- Chi ha paura del lupo bianco? C’era una volta il razzismo inconsapevole ("Who Is Afraid of the White Wolf?") (Erickson, 2025) ISBN 979-1259821591
- Rosa Parks che restò seduta ("Rosa Parks Remained Seated") (Einaudi, 2025) ISBN 978-8866568940

=== Publications with others ===
- Italian Feminisms: Transnational Praxes for Today and Tomorrow, Essays and Critical Stories (State University of New York Press, 2026) ISBN 979-8855809596
