= Malawi Prison Service =

Government agency of Malawi

- Unduna wa vya ku ndende (Chitumbuka)

Agency overview
- Formed: 20 December 1956
- Jurisdiction: Government of Malawi
- Headquarters: Lilongwe, Malawi

The Malawi Prison Service is a Malawian government agency responsible for the administration and management of prisons in Malawi.

== History ==
The Malawi Prison Service was formed by the Prisons Act of 1956, which established the prison system and the administration of prisons in Malawi. The Act was enacted by the British colonial government, which had previously administered prisons in Malawi through the colonial police force.

After Malawi gained independence in 1964, the Malawi Prison Service became a department within the Ministry of Home Affairs. The service was responsible for managing prisons, rehabilitating prisoners, and enforcing prison sentences.

In the 1970s and 1980s, the Malawi Prison Service underwent significant expansion and development. New prisons were built, and existing ones were renovated and expanded. The service also introduced new programs and services, such as vocational training, education, and counseling for prisoners.

=== As Nyasaland Prison Service ===
Before Nyasaland became a protectorate of Britain, there was no formal criminal justice system in place. Instead, native communities relied on customary laws to resolve disputes, with a focus on reconciliation. They also had their own system of penalty, which imposed punishments and censures as needed.

When the British established their administration in Nyasaland in 1891, they encountered resistance from some Africans who refused to pay taxes, resisted land alienation, and opposed forced labor. Additionally, groups such as the Ngonis, who engaged in raiding and looting, needed to be brought under control. To address these issues, offenders were usually arrested and then brought before the District Magistrates.

According to historical accounts, missionaries played a role in reporting criminal activity, but were advised not to take matters into their own hands. Instead, they were to hand over offenders to the Chief or local authorities. In one notable incident in 1895, a British official's askaris (local soldiers) were punished for procuring women for their drunken guests, despite the protests of the women's husbands. The askaris were then flogged and punished with the hard labor.

In the early days of colonial rule, flogging or whipping was a common punishment for a wide range of offenses, including adultery, disobedience, and neglect of duty. However, Sir Alfred Sharpe, who took over as administrator in 1897, attempted to put an end to these harsh practices.

Overall, the historical record shows that the introduction of a formal criminal justice system in Nyasaland was a complex and often brutal process, marked by resistance, cultural clashes, and the imposition of harsh punishments.

When Sir Alfred Sharpe took over as administrator in 1897, he aimed to reduce excessive flogging for minor offenses by establishing prisons at each of its 19 stations of the government. This led to the creation of the first prison in Blantyre in 1899, near the present-day Doogles' location. The prison was initially overseen by Chief Constable Handyside Shute David Piers Peter until 1913. Around the same time, the Zomba Prison was established, initially under the command of the Kings African Rifles and later under Officer-in-Charge G.F Manning in 1901.

The Zomba Prison was established in the military cantonment and was nicknamed "Nyumba ja Maganga" or "Stone House" by the native Yao people. The prison's superintendent, Duff, was also nicknamed Maganga, and the name became synonymous with prison management in the area. The Ordinance Prison of 1905 designated Zomba Prison Central and Fort Johnston (Mangochi) Prison for long-term offenders, while district headquarters prisons were for short-term prisoners. Blantyre prison was opened with the limited facilities for Europeans and Asians.

Before World War I, there was no separate department of prisons in Nyasaland, and no European officer was specifically appointed to oversee prisons. The military cantonment prison was used for long sentences, while district prisons were used for shorter sentences, with civil police acting as the warders were under control of the District Commissioners.

In 1913, Governor Sir George Smith sought to improve the organization of both prisons and police. The formal prison services started with appointment of the Superintendent Deputy at the Prison Central, followed by the first Residents Conference (Commissioners of the Districts) on police, which recommended improvements to the police force and prison system. After the war ended, it was proposed by Sir George Smith that the reorganization of the prison system, including the constructing of new Prison Central around 1917. The position of Prison Superintendent was offered to Edgar Herbert Warren, who declined, and later accepted by Jack Archer in 1919.

== Prison ordinance ==
Jack Archer, on June 18, 1919, assumed the role of Prison Superintendent, becoming the first European to accept the position. During his initial years, he oversaw significant construction projects at the Prison Central, including the completion of his own residence in 1920 and that of his deputy, Henry William Crosby, in 1919. In addition to his prison responsibilities, Archer was also appointed Asylum Lunatic of Superintendent, which had previously been managed by the military.

Prior to 1910, individuals with mental illnesses were housed within the prison central at the King's African Rifles (KAR) camp. In 1910, a little asylum was established at the camp, remaining under military command until 1919, when it came under Archer's supervision. The asylum lunatic, attached to the prison, initially accommodated eight inmates and served as a facility for individuals identified as mental and psychiatric cases and from across the country.

According to Mwakilama (2005), colonial administrators viewed psychiatric patients as disruptive to peace and problematic within their communities. As a result, they decided to imprison these individuals in district prisons before transferring them for medical attention to the Prison Central by Medical Officers. This arrangement aimed to alleviate communities of the issues caused by psychiatric patients.

With Jack Archer settled in as Prison Superintendent, the Ordinance Prison was enacted in 1920, formally establishing a Department of the Prisons in Nyasaland, which was headquartered in Zomba. The department oversaw prison affairs nationwide, with Commissioner Chief of Police Major Trant Francis Stephens serving as Inspector Chief of Prisons. Despite this, Archer was responsible for implementing new rules and discipline in districts under European Police Officers. In 1921, Archer discussed about the operationalization of the Ordinance Prison with Major Stephens, and work began on a larger asylum lunatic and an incinerator, which was completed by the end of 1921. The new prison was substantially finished in 1922.

By 1927, the Zomba Prison Central had 265 prisoners, who were divided into gangs for various tasks. That year, prisoners produced 150,000 kilns of bricks and 129 wicker-work baskets. Over time, prisons were established to undertake specific projects using prison labor, but were usually disbanded when the project was being completed. Examples include Kanjedza Detention Camp, Mapanga Prison, Chileka Prison, Chitedze Prison, Mpyupyu Prison, Limbe Tung Station Prison, Mzuzu Prison, and Mkhate Prison.

By the mid-1930s, Archer had earned a reputation as a reformer prison progression. He broke out the unproductive labor as punishment and visited other prisons to learn from their methods and trades. He ensured that long-term prisoners left with a skill, such as bricklaying or carpentry, to aid their reintegration into society. In 1931, four of African trade warders were chosen, and Archer's wife taught at the prison of the women and those in the asylum lunatic to knit as a source of money and therapy. Archer served as Superintendent for twenty years, retiring on May 18, 1939, at the age of 67, with a legacy of progressive prison reform.

Just three months after the starting of the World War II, Jack Archer, DCM, came out of retirement and was appointed Commanding Officer H Company on November 6, 1939. He later served as Commanding Officer of the Headquarters Company and Garrison in Zomba from April 1940 to June 1941. In a notable development, Archer was temporarily reassigned as Superintendent Acting of the Prison Central and Asylum Lunatic in February and March 1942, effectively returning to his former role. This move was made to cover his successor for the absence of, Paveley Sanders George, who at the time was on the leave until a suitable replacement could be appointed as Acting Superintendent.

=== Establishment of a Prison Commissioner, 1943 ===
In 1943, a significant development took place in the prison administration when a commissioner of prisons was appointed for the first time. This marked a new era in the management of prisons, as the Commissioner was responsible for overseeing the entire prison system, including the Prison Central and Asylum Lunatic. The appointment aimed to bring about reforms and improvements in the prison service, ensuring more efficient and humane management of correctional facilities.

During World War II, the Prisons Department underwent significant administrative changes. In September 1943, Mr. W.H. Ingram became the first Commissioner of Prisons, replacing the Superintendent. This change meant that all prisons in the Protectorate were now under the Commissioner's control, rather than the Police. Previously, Commissioner Chief of Police had overseen the prisons since 1921, and during the war, also headed the Political Intelligence Bureau, responsible for detaining foreign enemies.

As a result, after Italy had joined the war in 1940, Italian foreigners were lined up and imprisoned, along with German and other foreign enemies. The Commissioner Chief had to find alternative holding areas for these political detainees, and coincidentally, the Sabbatini Castle at Mapanga Estates was available. The castle was used to intern foreign enemies, including women, during the war.

In the end of the year 1943, the Nyasaland Prison Service categorized its holdings into four classes: Mpyupyu (of Class I) and Zomba Central, regional facilities like Lilongwe (Class II) and Blantyre, district facilities (Class III), and police lock-ups (Class 4, added in 1945).

After the war, the Federation of Nyasaland and Rhodesia was established in 1954, and the Nyasaland Prison Service was taken over by the Federal Department of Prisons, headquartered in Salisbury (now Harare), Zimbabwe. The Federal Act of thePrisons was passed in 1955 to create a uniform prison service and modern penal system. All territorial prisons were renamed Her Majesty's Prison, and the Commissioner of Prisons title was replaced with two Officers-in-Charge reporting to the Director of Federal of Prisons in Salisbury. The prisons department was initially under the Ministry of Home Affairs, but later transferred to the Ministry of Law (Justice) in 1958.

=== The dissolution of the government ===
After the Federation of Nyasaland and Rhodesia dissolved on December 31, 1963, the Nyasaland Prison Service reverted to its pre-federation status. When Malawi gained independence in 1964, all officers serving under the Federal Government retired, as well as those who wished to continue had to forgo their pension and be re-engaged under the Malawi Government. The name was changed to Malawi Government Security Prison, still headed by the commissioner expatriate, Mr. Keohane J.

As part of the Africanisation policy, efforts were made to localize senior posts in government agencies. At independence, Europeans held top positions, while Africans filled lower ranks due to limited educational qualifications. However, Africans like Superintendent J.J. Simbeye and others were being groomed to take over senior positions.

In 1964, seven women were recruited as Wadresses, marking the inclusion of gender in the prison structure. On July 6, 1966, the prison service became the Malawi Prisons Service, with Mr. J. Keohane continuing as Commissioner until his retirement in 1968. Senior Superintendent Alan Davison acted as Commissioner before being confirmed in the position in 1970. He retired in 1975, and Mr. Hector Chausa became the first Malawian Commissioner.

In 1971, the prison recruits of the training school were established, and in 1972, forty prison staff underwent training in prison administration. In 1982, the Malawi Prison and Police were omitted, and the recruits received the joint training at Kanjedza Training School of Police and College Police in Zomba. This led to the transfer of senior police officers to the Prison Department and the introduction of a Welfare Branch for prison personnel and their families.

The first Malawian Commissioner, Mr. Hector Chausa, welcomed the developments, including the training of prison officers at police facilities. In 1983, the Inspector General of Police welcomed 28 Prison Warders and policemen into the Malawi Police Force after their successful training. The harmonization led to changes in ranks, with the head of Prisons becoming the Commissioner Chief of Prisons. Two Prison Officers also completed a commanding course cadet at the College. Police. In 1986, several Prison Officers were promoted to senior ranks, marking a significant milestone in the localization of the prison service.

== Challenges ==
Despite its progress, the Malawi Prison Service has faced numerous challenges, including overcrowding, poor sanitation, and inadequate funding. The service has also faced criticism for human rights abuses and poor conditions in prisons.

== Reforms ==
In response to these challenges, the Malawi Prison Service has implemented various reforms, including the introduction of community service sentences, parole, and rehabilitation programs. The service has also worked to improve conditions in prisons and to address human rights concerns.

== Recently ==
Wandika Phiri became the head of the Prison service in 2017. In 2023 she was succeeded by Masauko Ng’ombeyagwada.

The Malawi Prison Service was responsible for managing 23 district prison stations, which are either first-class or second-class prisons. The service has a staff of over 2,000 officers and is headed by a Commissioner of Prisons. The service continues to face challenges, but it is working to improve its services and to provide humane and effective correctional services to prisoners.

== Prisons under control ==
The agency controls all prisons in Malawi. Some notable prisons include:

- Zomba Central Prison
- Lilongwe Central Prison
- Blantyre Central Prison
- Mzuzu Central Prison
- Chichiri Prison
- Kachere Prison
- Mzimba Prison
- Maula Prison
- Nkhata Bay Prison
- Ntcheu Prison
- Dedza Prison
- Dowa Prison
- Kasungu Prison
- Mchinji Prison
- Salima Prison
- Monkey Bay Prison
- Mangochi Prison
- Zomba Maximum Security Prison
- Chilwa Prison
- Liwonde Prison
- Mwanza Prison
- Neno Prison
- Nsanje Prison
- Chikwawa Prison
- Thyolo Prison
- Mulanje Prison
- Phalombe Prison
- Chiradzulu Prison
- Balaka Prison
- Machinga Prison
- Mangochi Prison
- Salima Young Offenders Prison
- Lilongwe Women's Prison
- Zomba Women's Prison
- Blantyre Women's Prison
- Mzuzu Women's Prison
- Chichiri Youth Prison
- Kachere Youth Prison
- Maula Youth Prison
- Nkhata Bay Youth Prison
- Ntcheu Youth Prison

== See also ==
- Ministry of Homeland Security (Malawi)
- Mzimba Prison
