= Edina Navaya =

Malawian teacher, minister

Edina Pengani Navaya
- Navaya in 2022
- Born: Edina Pengani; 31 October 1969; Lunzu, Malawi
- Died: 29 October 2023 (aged 53); Blantyre, Malawi
- Education: Domasi Teachers Training College, Zomba Theological College
- Known for: early woman minister in Malawi

Edina Pengani Navaya (born Edna Pengani, 31 October 1969 – 29 October 2023) was a Malawian teacher who became the first Malawian woman to be ordained as a Minister of Word and Sacrament.

== Life ==
Navaya was born in Lunzu in 1969. She lived with her parents until she was six and she then went to live in Thondwe in the Zomba District with her sister, Nesta. She attended Nankumba Primary School and Stella Maris Secondary School, graduating in 1988.

Navaya trained to be a teacher at Domasi Teachers Training College and her first appointment was to Namadidi Community Day Secondary School in 1990. In the same year she married the headmaster and they had three children. Their last child was born and her husband died in 1995. Navaya had a strong interest in the church from a child and she was inspired to serve Malawi's Presbyterian church.

When she applied for the second time to Zomba Theological College in 1999 to study theology, even though it was not possible for a woman to become a minister in Malawi - but times were changing.

Martha Mwale was the first woman to be ordained in Malawi by the Presbyterian church in 1999. Mwale was ordained by the Livingstonia Synod and later that year Navaya and two others were ordained by the Blantyre Synod. She was the first in Blantyre and the "first Minister of word and sacrament." Note: Reverend Salome Sifile Dlamini, who was ordained in Eswatini, was a missionary in Malawi in 1973.

== Death and legacy ==
Navaya was the minister in Limbe. She was diagnosed and died in hospital in Blantyre in 2023, two days before her 54th birthday and her funeral.

She was survived by her husband and four children.
