= Zomba Theological College =

Coordinates: 15.38142°S 35.3246°E

- Motto: Until we all reach unity in the faith
- Type: Private
- Established: 1977
- Affiliations: Church of Central Africa Presbyterian
- Principal: Takuze Chitsulo
- Location: Zomba, Malawi
- Website: www.zombatheological.org

Zomba Theological College is a theological seminary in Zomba, Malawi. It has been operated since 1977 by the Church of Central Africa Presbyterian for training ministry candidates for the Nkhoma, Livingstonia, Harare, Zambia, and Blantyre Synods. The principal is Takuze Chitsulo. Anglican candidates joined in 1978 but left in 2006, when Leonard Kamungu Theological College was formed. As of 2018, degrees were accredited by the University of Malawi.

ZTC partnered with the University of Aberdeen in 2016, whereby students could study for an MTh degree.

== Notable staff ==
Kenneth R. Ross is the Professor of Theology and Dean of Postgraduate Studies at the college. He was the Chair of the Scotland Malawi Partnership. He was involved in establishing a theology degree course at the University of Malawi Chancellor College.

== Alumni ==
Malawi's first woman minister of word and sacrament, Edina Navaya, began her study here in 1999.
