= Nkhoma Deka Solar Power Station =

Solar farm in Malawi

- Country: Malawi
- Location: Nkhoma, Lilongwe District
- Coordinates: 14°03′06″S 34°06′32″E
- Status: Proposed
- Construction began: 2023 Expected
- Commission date: 2024 Expected
- Owner: Nkhoma Deka Solar Consortium

Solar farm
- Type: Flat-panel PV

Power generation
- Nameplate capacity: 50 MW (67,000 hp)

Nkhoma Deka Solar Power Station is a planned 50 MW (67,000 hp) solar power plant in Malawi. The solar farm is under development by a consortium comprising Solarcentury Africa (SOCA), headquartered in London, United Kingdom and Renewable Energy Services Africa (RESA), domiciled in Cape Town, South Africa. This power station is part of Malawi's efforts to increase installed national generation capacity from 400 MW, in 2021 to 1,000 MW by 2025.

== Location ==
The power station would sit on 150 hectares (370 acres) of land, near the town of Nkhoma, in Lilongwe District, in the Central Region of the country. Nkhoma is located approximately 55 kilometres (34 mi) southeast of Lilongwe, the capital city of Malawi.

== Overview ==
The solar farm is under development as a joint-venture between two IPPs based in the United Kingdom. Solarcentury Africa specializes in "solar photovoltaic and storage" systems on the continent. Renewable Energy Services Africa (RESA), on the other hand, is a foundation that promotes dialogue, interaction and coordination between African governments and financiers, to exploit and develop the continent's energy potential. Both SOCA and RESA are headquartered in London, United Kingdom.

The developers of this renewable energy infrastructure are expected to form an ad hoc special purpose vehicle company to design, build, own, operate and maintain the power station. An energy storage system will be constructed in tandem with the solar farm. The energy generated here is expected to be sold directly to the Electricity Supply Commission of Malawi (ESCOM), the Malawian national electricity utility company, for integration into the national grid.

== Benefits ==
This power station, together with its energy storage infrastructure, will add 50 megawatts of "clean energy" to the national grid of Malawi. It will also contribute to the country's goal of increasing national installed generation capacity from 400 MW in 2021 to 1,000 MW by 2025.

== See also ==
- List of power stations in Malawi
