= Martha Mwale =

- Born: 4 April 1945; Nkhotakota District
- Died: 4 February 2004 (aged 58)
- Education: Likuni Girls' Secondary School
- Occupations: Teacher and Presbyterian minister
- Known for: First Malawian women minister
- Spouse: Winfred Abner Taonga Mwale

Martha Mwale (4 April 1945 – 4 February 2004) was a Malawian teacher, political prisoner and church leader. She became a Presbyterian parish minister and was the first woman minister ordained in Malawi.

== Life ==
Mwale was born in the Nkhotakota District in 1945. Her father was an evangelist working in South Africa and she lived with her mother in the Nkhunga CCAP. Her mother was a leader in the Women's Guild. She went to Mlala Primary School and her results were excellent. She went on to Likuni Girls' Secondary School. She was teased for liking English, but she also spoke Chitonga, Chitumbuka and Chichewa. She helped to lead the Christian Youth Fellowship and although only sixteen she was made a church elder.

She married William Mwale in 1970 and went back to teach at Likuni Girls' Secondary School. In 1974 she refused an offer to become a member of parliament. This upset the dictatorial President Hastings Banda and their house was searched. Some small notes that did not reflect well on the President were found. They both found themselves arrested and taken to Mikuyu Prison. William was released but she spent two years suffering captivity, poor food and torture. She was briefly offered freedom, but she went to prison for three more years because she would not go to political rallies. Her fourth child was born and died while she was in prison.

Malawi's Independence day was July 6 and in 1979 she was included in the prisoners released to celebrate.

In 1990 the Blantyre Synod hosted a meeting of women theologians and despite a wide invitation list there was only twelve attendees and they were all member of the Presbyterian church. Mwale was one of the twelve.

She had to serve a year's probation and she was then ordained. She was the first woman to be ordained in Malawi by the Presbyterian church in 1999, in 2000 or 2001. She was ordained by the Livingstonia Synod and later that year three others were also ordained by the Blantyre Synod and one of them, Edna or Edina Navaya, was also a woman. She was not the first woman minister in Malawi as the Rev. Salome Sifile Dlamini, who had been ordained in Eswatini, had served as a minister in Malawi in 1973.

She died in 2004 from causes linked to her diabetes.
