= Likuni Girls' Secondary School =

School in Lilongwe, Malawi

Coordinates: 14.027°S 33.707°E

- Lilongwe; Malawi

Information
- Established: 1963

Likuni Girls' Secondary School (abbreviated as LGSS) is a Catholic secondary boarding school for girls, located in Lilongwe. The school, run by the Teresian Sisters, achieves among the highest Malawi School Certificate of Education (MSCE) examination results in the country.

== History ==
The school was founded in 1963.

In 2009, Mireille Twaigara, a Rwandan refugee at Likuni Girls, achieved among the ten best MSCE results in the country, winning a Zodiak Broadcasting Station award to study medicine in China. In 2019 two students from the school won Zodiak 'Girl Child Awards' for their performance in the 2018 MSCE examinations.

The school had 600 students in 2015, when the telecommunications company Airtel Malawi donated cement to construct a school sports course, as well as 500 chairs for classroom learning. In 2020 the school received a gift of 100 copies of a book about human trafficking by the activist Maxwell Matewere.

In 2023 the school celebrated its diamond jubilee with Monica Chakwera, First Lady of Malawi as a guest and as a returning alumni.

== Notable alumni ==
The Likuni Girls alumni association has undertaken charitable activity on behalf of the elderly in Malawi. Notable alumni include:

- Monica Chakwera, First Lady of Malawi
- Maggie Madimbo, Vice Chancellor of African Bible Colleges
- Anastasia Msosa became the first woman to be Chief Justice.
- Martha Mwale, 1945-2004, teacher (here), political prisoner and the First Malawian woman to be a Presbyterian minister
- Agnes Patemba, high court judge and diplomat
- Mary Shawa, principal secretary in the Ministry of Women and Gender
- Mireille Twayigira, Rwandan refugee and doctor
