= ZTC =

ZTC may refer to:

- Zomba Theological College
- Zonal Training Centre
