= Annie Lemani =

Malawian politician

Annie Lemani Singani Anambewe

Deputy Minister of Internal Affairs and Public Security of Malawi
- Incumbent
- Assumed office 9 August 2010
- President: Bingu wa Mutharika

Personal details
- Born: Annie Lemani; 31 March 1946 Malawi
- Died: 15 January 2017 (aged 70) Blantyre
- Party: Democratic Progressive Party (Malawi)

Annie Lemani aka Annie Lemani Singani Anambewe or just Anambewe was a Malawian politician and educator. She was the member of parliament for the Zomba Thondwe Constituency. She was the Deputy Minister of Internal Affairs and Public Security in Malawi from 2010 to 2011.

== Life ==
Lemani was born in 1946. Her brother was the Rev Finlay Dumbo Lemani who had been the Zomba Thondwe member of parliament in 2004.

She was elected in the May 2009 elections to represent the Zomba Thondwe Constituency. Lemani was appointed to be the Deputy Minister of Internal Affairs and Public Security in early 2010 by the former president of Malawi, Bingu wa Mutharika. Her term began on 9 August 2010. The President sacked his entire 42 member cabinet in 2011.

Lemani died in 2017 in a Queen Elizabeth Hospital in 2017 having survived her brother Finlay who had been the campaign director for the United Democratic Party.

Awards and achievements
Preceded by	Deputy Minister of Internal Affairs and Public Security of Malawi	Succeeded by
