= Kenneth R. Ross =

British professor and author

Kenneth R Ross
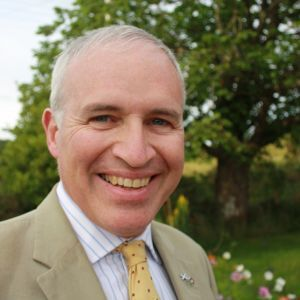
- in 2016
- Born: 1959 (age 66–67)
- Other name: Ken Ross
- Occupations: Church minister, academic, dean
- Employer: Zomba Theological College
- Known for: Dean of Postgraduate Studies at Zomba Theological College in Malawi.
- Title: Reverend Dr.
- Spouse: Hester
- Children: 3

Kenneth R. Ross OBE or Ken Ross (born c. 1959) is a British Professor of Theology and Dean of Postgraduate Studies at Zomba Theological College in Malawi. He has written and edited a number of books including the ten volume Edinburgh Companions to Global Christianity.

== Life ==
Ross was born about 1959. He was raised in Glasgow and studied at the University of Edinburgh.

After the year 2000, Ross was involved with the formation of a partnership between Scotland and Malawi. In 2004, he became the chair of an NGO called the Scotland Malawi Partnership.

Since 2012, Ross has served as a theological consultant for the World Council of Churches' (WCC) Commission on World Mission and Evangelism. During this time, he chaired the drafting committee for the 2012 mission statement Together Towards Life. He later co-chaired the committee responsible for the 2018 Arusha Call to Discipleship.

He returned to being a church minister in 2010 when he took over five churches near Oban in Argyll known as Netherlorn until 2019. The churches were at Craignish, Luing and Seil, Kilmelford, and Kilninver.

In 2013, Ross wrote and published "Malawi and Scotland Together in the Talking Place Since 1859". The book documents the long friendship and changing relationship between the two nations. Ross quoted the Scottish minister Fiona Hyslop who had referred to Malawi as its "sister nation".

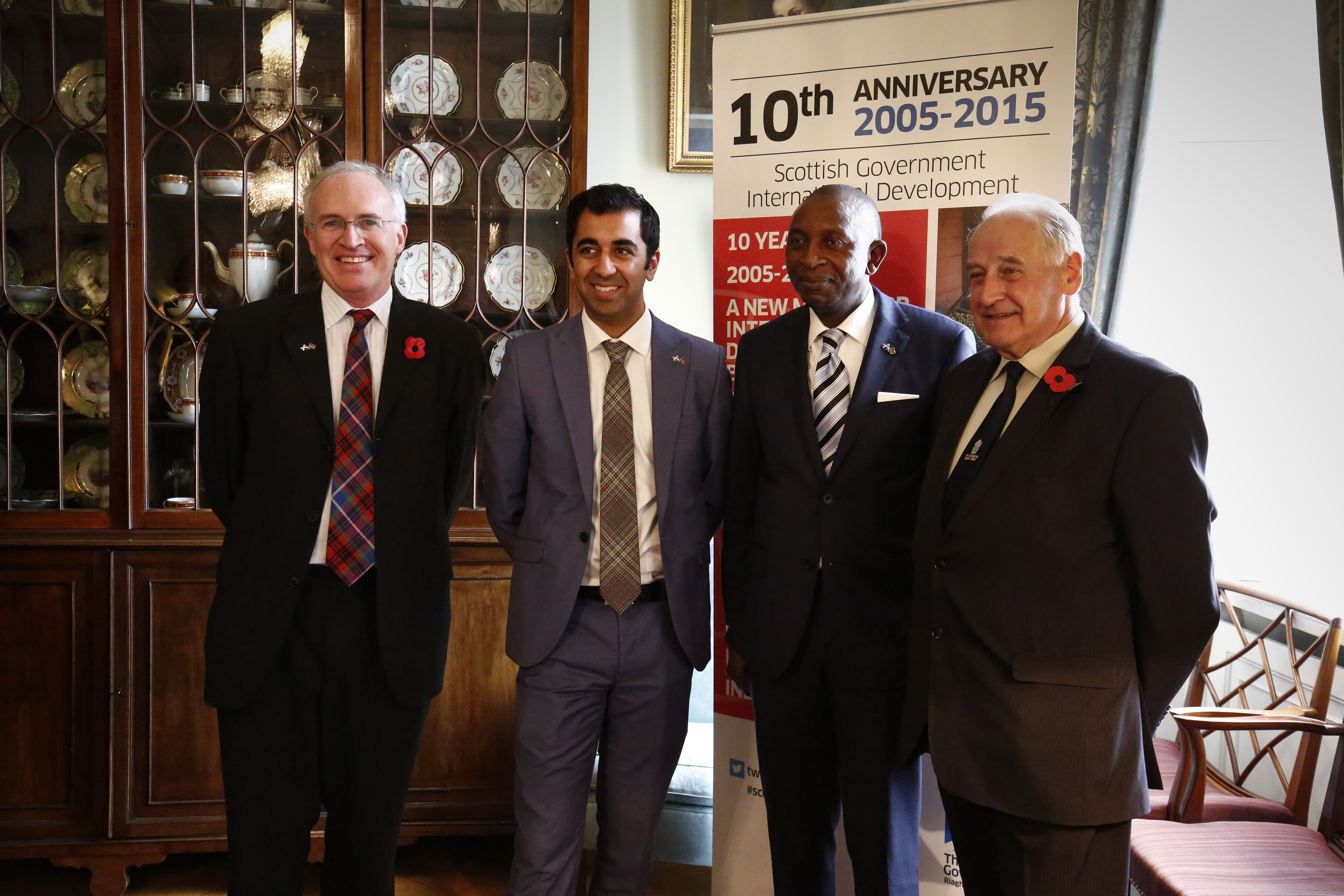
Ten years of the SMP: Ken Ross on left

In the 2016's New Years Honours he was awarded an OBE.

In 2019, Ross stood down for the second time as Chair of the SMP as he decided to move to Malawi. He was succeeded by Professor Heather Cubie.

Ross has spoken about the change of focus in global christianity. Europe and North America were over 80% Christian in 1900 and by 2025 the figure was just over 30%. However the growth in the global south meant that less than 20% of all Christians will live in the Global north. He argues that there is a growing imperative for ecumenical movements. However the trend is further fractionalisation and Islam is projected to grow faster that Christianity in the future. In 2025 he was one of the editors of the "Compact Atlas of Global Christianity".

== Writing ==
Ross is Series Editor of the Edinburgh Companions to Global Christianity, published by Edinburgh University Press. By 2023, seven volumes were published:

1. Christianity in Sub-Saharan Africa (2017)
2. Christianity in North Africa and West Asia (2018)
3. Christianity in South and Central Asia (2019)
4. Christianity in East and Southeast Asia (2020)
5. Christianity in Oceania (2021)
6. Christianity in Latin America (and in Spanish) (2022)
7. Christianity in North America (2023)
8. Christianity in Western and Northern Europe (2024)
9. Christianity in Eastern and Southern Europe (2025)
10. Compact Atlas of Global Christianity (2025)

=== Other publications include ===
- Mission as God’s Spiral of Renewal, 2019
- Mission Rediscovered: Transforming Disciples. A Commentary on the Arusha Call to Discipleship, Geneva: World Council of Churches, 2020; with Klaus Fiedler,
- A Malawi Church History 1860-2020, Mzuzu: Mzuni Press, 2020; co-edited with Chammah J. Kaunda, Atola Longkumer and Esther Mombo
- Kaunda, Chammah J.; Longkumer, Atola; Ross, Kenneth R.; Mombo, Esther, eds. (2021). Christianity and COVID-19: Pathways for Faith. Routledge. ISBN 978-1-000-52229-7.
- Mombo, E. (Editor) (2020) A Malawi Church History 1860-2020, Mzuzu: Mzuni Press, 2020; co-edited with Chammah J. Kaunda, Atola Longkumer and Kenneth R. Ross
- Christianity and COVID-19: Pathways for Faith, London and New York: Routledge, 2022; and co-edited with Asiyati Lorraine Chiweza and Wapulumuka O. Mulwafu, Cape Town: University of Cape Town Press, 2022
