= Thondwe =

- village
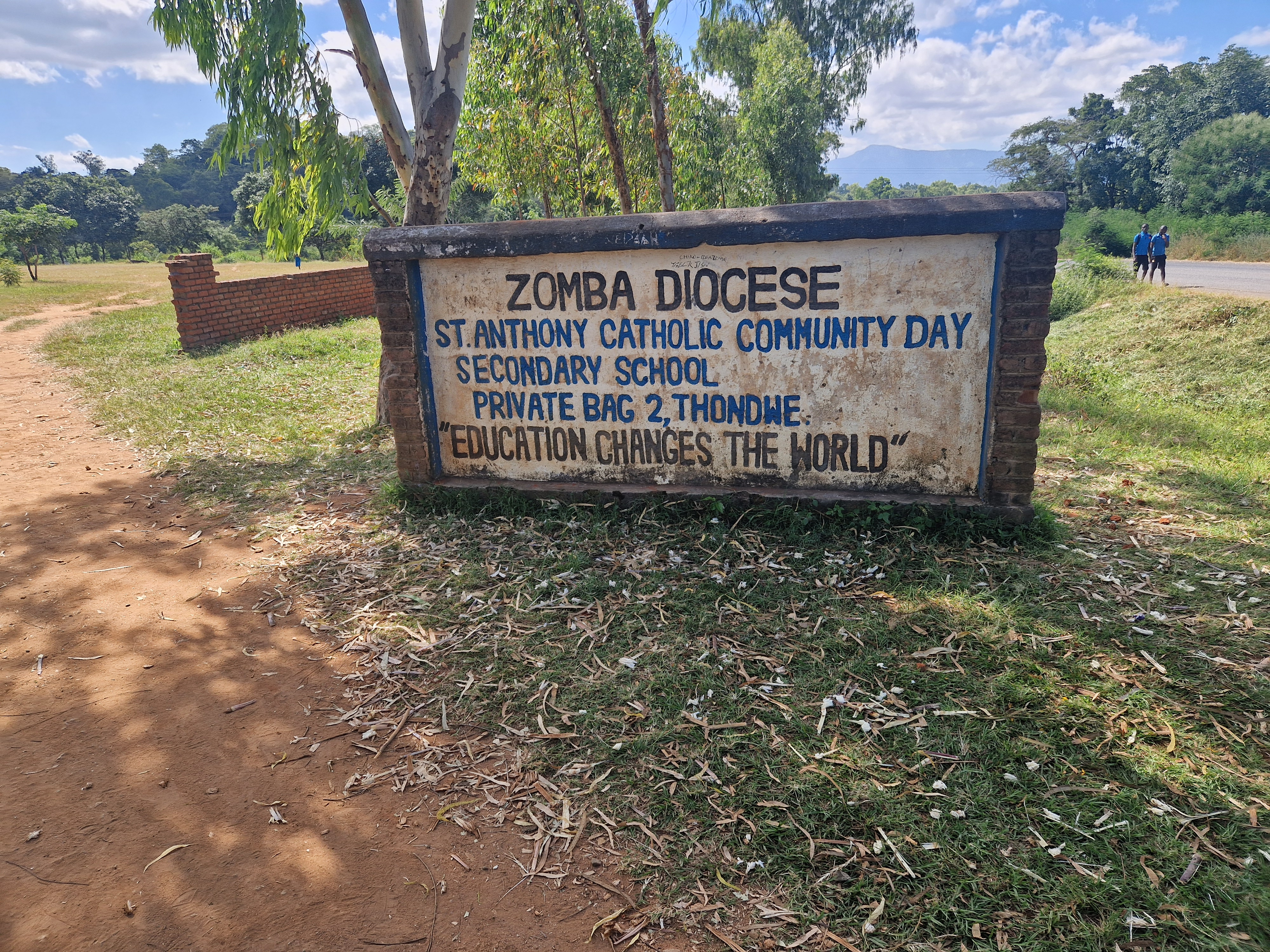
- St Anthony Catholic Community Day Secondary School in 2026

- Location in Malawi
- Coordinates: 15°30′18.5″S 35°26′15.2″E
- Country: Malawi
- Region: Southern Region
- District: Zomba District
- Time zone: UTC+2
- Climate: Cwa

Thondwe is a small community near the city of Zomba in southern Malawi, in the Shire Highlands. It is part of the Zomba Thondwe Constituency and in the 2019 elections Roseby Gadama was elected as the member of parliament.

== Description ==
Thondwe Primary School has been open since 1924.

Popular government minister Dunduzu Chisiza died on 3 September 1962. He and his cream-coloured Mercedes was found in a small stream bed beside a bridge at Thondwe, on the road to Zomba. It was said that he died in the car crash.

In 2013 the school had over 1,700 students from year 1 to year 8. The school has a "light library" that uses solar power to deliver light for reading and homework in the dark evenings. The school's library opened in 2017 funded by a group in Scotland who have also twinned local businesses with local opticians, cafe owners, hairdressers and a craft group. The twinning has resulted in loans that help entrepreneurs, and women in particular, to launch businesses. The two communities have been working together since 2008.

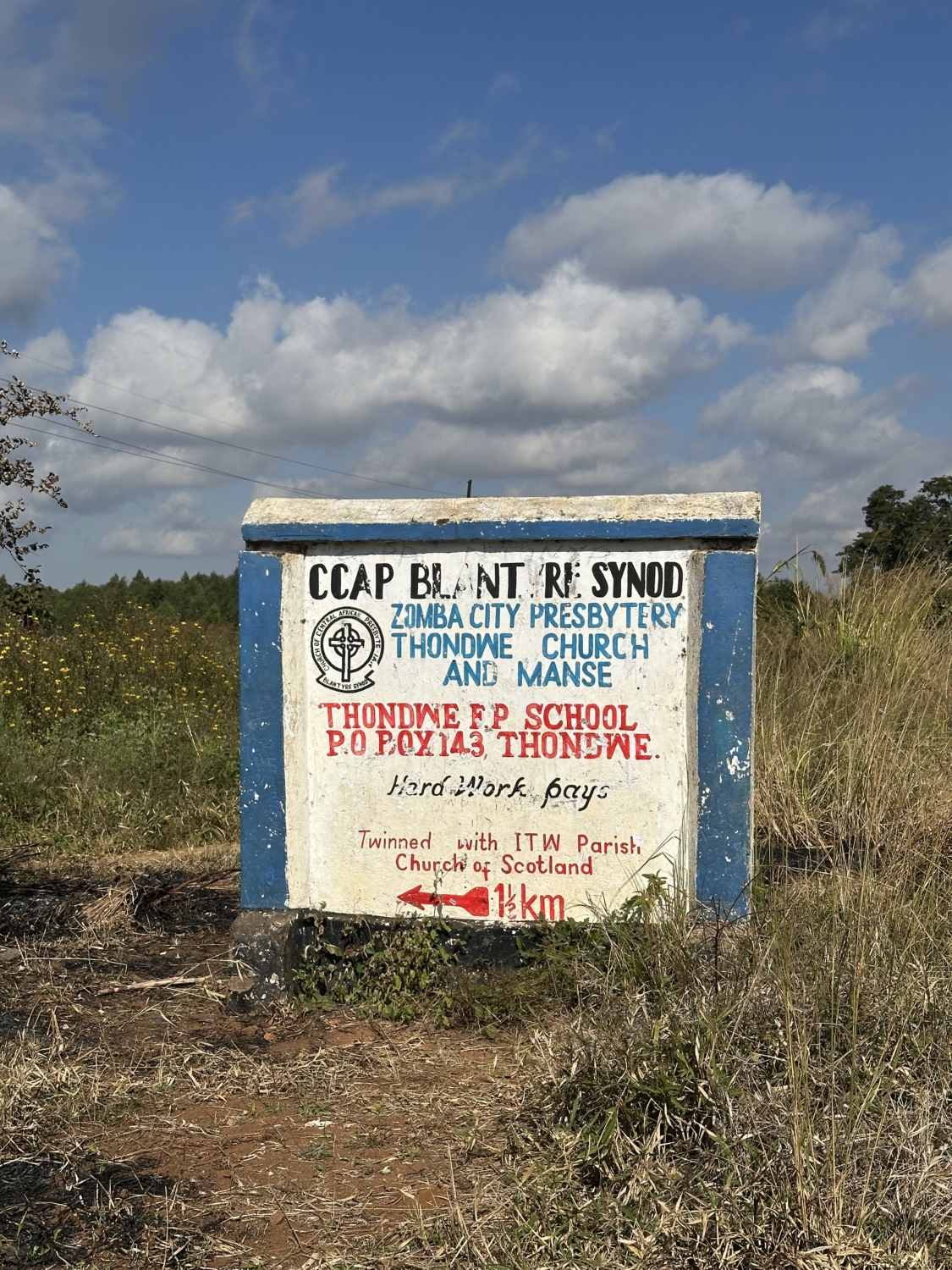
CCAP sign - 1.5 km

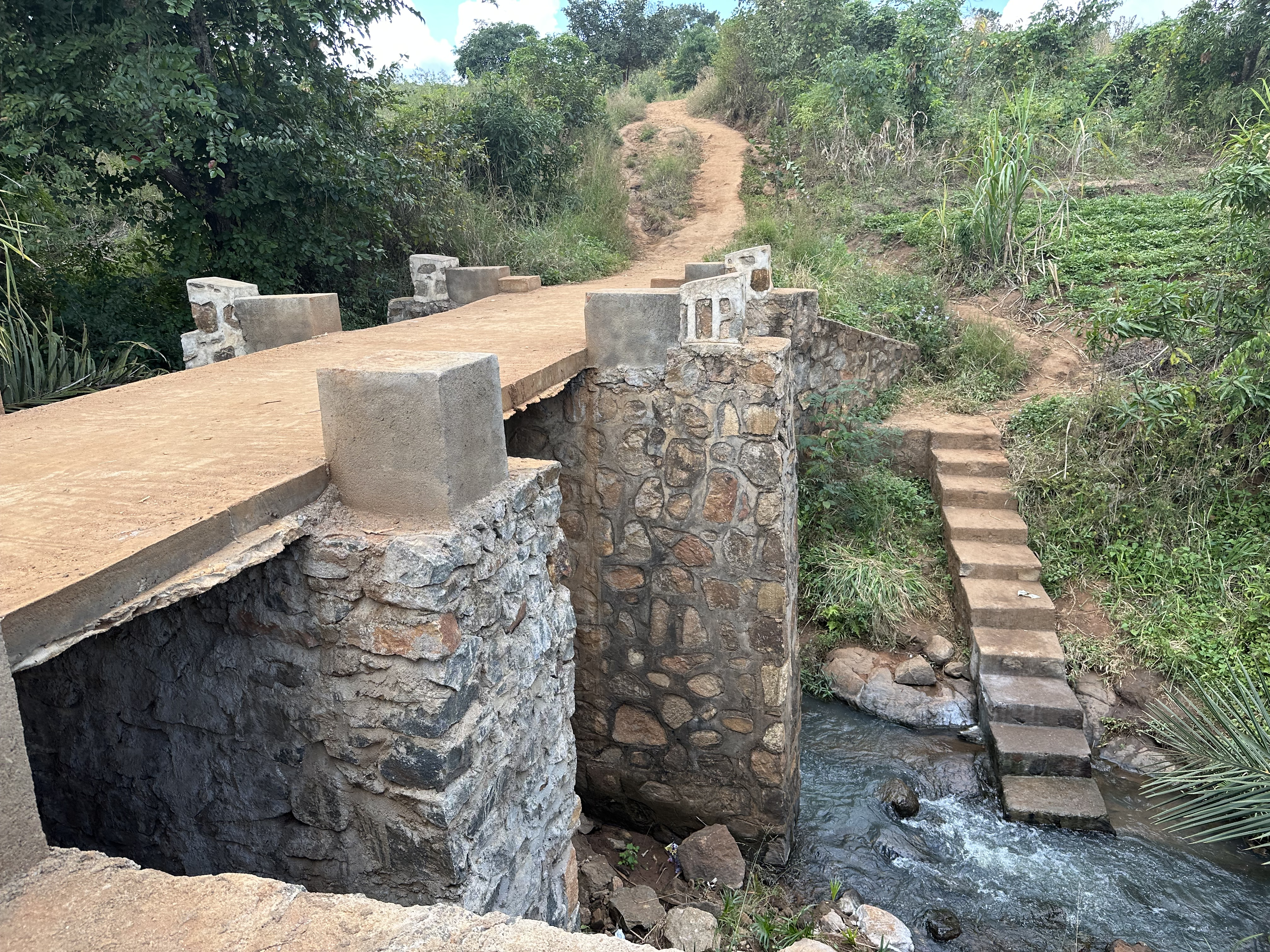
The new (2024) bridge over the River Niwali in Thondwe

In 2018 the local member of parliament Charles Tikhiwa estimated that there were 154 000 people in the district requiring food. He made an appeal to the government. Irrigation schemes were being created but communities around Lake Chilwe needed help. In 2019, Tikhiwa was defeated and Roseby Gadama was elected as the independent MP for Zomba Thondwe.

In 2022 Tropical Storm Ana hit and the whole of Malawi received some damage. The replacement of some roofs in Thongwe was funded by the Scottish twinned community of Innerleithen who arranged for metal roofs to replace the damaged thatch roofs. Metal roofs have health benefits as they do not encourage malarial mosquitoes.

In early 2023 Cyclone Freddy caused hundreds of deaths in Malawi and thousands were made homeless. Damage was high in Thondwe and appeals were made for assistance. The local MP Roseby Gadama took journalists to see the damage. A local bridge was re-built and it was opened by members of the Church of Central Africa Presbyterian who were celebrating their church's centenary. There was a prayer day in Thondwe on 10 October 2023 and Roseby Gadama announced that her parents were intending to fund an ambulance and she would donate a million kwacha.

== Climate ==
Climate data for (nearby) Zomba in 2011
Month	Jan	Feb	Mar	Apr	May	Jun	Jul	Aug	Sep	Oct	Nov	Dec	Year
Mean daily maximum °C (°F)	27 (80)	27 (80)	26 (79)	26 (78)	24 (76)	22 (72)	22 (72)	24 (75)	27 (81)	29 (85)	29 (85)	27 (81)	26 (79)
Mean daily minimum °C (°F)	18 (65)	18 (65)	18 (65)	17 (62)	14 (58)	12 (54)	12 (53)	13 (55)	15 (59)	18 (64)	19 (66)	18 (65)	16 (61)
Average precipitation mm (inches)	310 (12.1)	250 (9.9)	260 (10.1)	69 (2.7)	18 (0.7)	10 (0.4)	7.6 (0.3)	7.6 (0.3)	5.1 (0.2)	25 (1)	110 (4.3)	280 (10.9)	1,340 (52.9)
Source: Weatherbase
