= Church of Central Africa Presbyterian – Synod of Zambia =

Synod of the Church of Central Africa Presbyterian

Synod of Zambia
- Classification: Protestant
- Theology: Reformed
- Polity: Presbyterian
- Associations: World Communion of Reformed Churches, Evangelical Fellowship of Zambia, Council of Churches in Zambia, Bible Society in Zambia, Theological Education by Extension in Zambia
- Region: Zambia
- Origin: 1984; Zambia
- Congregations: 67
- Members: 65,000
- Ministers: 58 plus 9 evangelists

The Synod of Zambia is one of the five synods of the Church of Central Africa Presbyterian.

== History ==
The Zambia Synod was the work of the Church of Central Africa Presbyterian – Synod of Livingstonia. Those mission stations and surrounding Christian communities become part of the United Church in Central Africa in Rhodesia later the United Church in Zambia. However, congregations around Lundazi were cut off from the United Church in Zambia and they developed a separate church life, linked with the CCAP Synod of Livingstonia. The first Presbytery in Zambia was formed in 1899. This was composed of all of the mission stations and congregations established in northern Zambia. When the Synod was constituted in 1984, it was composed of 2 Presbyteries, 16 congregations and 4 ordained ministers. This group spread rapidly. According to the church's statistics as of August, 2010, the Zambia Synod had 67 congregations in 11 presbyteries and more than 65,000 members served by 58 ordained ministers and 8 evangelists. That means 1250 member per pastor, who serve the growing number of congregations. The Synod relocated in 2010 from Eastern Zambia to Lusaka.

== Theology ==
The official confessions are the Westminster Confession of Faith and the Belgic Confession, the Heidelberg Catechism, the Canons of Dort and the CCAP Confession of Faith adopted in 1924. The Synod has close relations with the Uniting Presbyterian Church in Southern Africa, the United Church in Zambia and the Reformed Church in Zambia.

It is a member of the World Communion of Reformed Churches, the Evangelical Fellowship in Zambia and the Bible Society of Zambia.

The center of the church is in Lusaka, Zambia. It maintains the Chasefu Theological College, located in the Lundazi District.
