= Esther Mombo =

Kenyan theologian (born 1957)

Esther Moraa Mombo
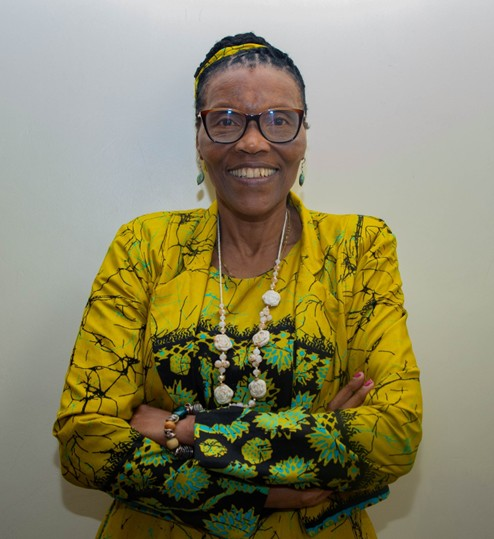
- Born: 15 May 1957 (age 69); Birongo Village in Kisii County, Kenya
- Occupation: Professor of Theology
- Title: Professor

Academic background
- Education: PhD- University of Edinburgh Master of Philosophy- Trinity College, Dublin Bachelor of Divinity-St.Paul's United Theological College
- Alma mater: University of Edinburgh

Academic work
- Discipline: Theology
- Sub-discipline: African Women Theology
- Institutions: St. Paul's University Limuru, Kenya
- Main interests: Mission History, Interfaith Relations, Theology & Gender Studies

Esther Moraa Mombo (born 15 May 1957) is a Kenyan female theologian and a full professor of theology in the school of theology at St. Paul's University, Limuru. She researches church history, with a focus on mission history, interfaith relations and theology, and gender studies, with a focus on African women's theologies, sexuality, and HIV/AIDS. She is the founder of the Tamar campaign in Kenya, which acknowledges gender-based violence in society and empowers churches to address it. She is a founding member of The Circle of Concerned African Women Theologians St. Paul’s chapter in Kenya. Mombo is the Vice-Chancellor of St. Paul's University, Limuru, Kenya.

== Early life and education ==
Esther Mombo was born in Birongo Village, the daughter of Stanley Mombo Maikururi and Maria Vulimu Mombo at Birongo Village in Kisii County, Kenya. Her father was a member of the Seventh-day Adventist Church and her mother was a Quaker. However, she was brought up by a Quaker grandmother who she referred to as her first pastor and theological educator.

Mombo earned a Bachelor of Divinity degree from St Paul's United Theological College (now St. Paul's University, Limuru) and a Master of Philosophy degree from the Irish School of Ecumenics of Trinity College Dublin. She returned to Kenya to teach at an Anglican bible college, where she became an Anglican herself. Mombo completed her Ph.D. in 1998 at School of Divinity, University of Edinburgh as part of the Centre for the Study of Christianity in the Non-Western World. She wrote her Ph.D. thesis on the topic "A historical and cultural analysis of the position of Abaluyia Women in Kenyan Quaker Christianity: 1902–1979."

== Career ==
Mombo started her teaching career at St. Paul's United Theological College, Limuru Kenya, (now St. Paul's University) in 1999 as a lecturer in historical studies and women's studies and rose through the rank to become a full professor of theology at the school of theology in the same university. Since then, she has held various administrative posts at St. Paul's University, Limuru, during a period when the institution moved from a theological college to a fully-fledged private ecumenical university. Mombo worked in top management at the same university for fifteen years, from academic dean to Deputy Vice Chancellor Academic Affairs (2007 to 2013). She has also served as the Director of International Partnerships and Alumni Relations at St. Paul's University, Limuru.

She has worked as an external examiner for postgraduate students in several universities including Africa International University, Kenyatta University, Tumaini University Makumira in Tanzania, and in South Africa the University of KwaZulu-Natal and University of Pretoria.

Mombo has served as a visiting professor at a number of academic institutions, including Candler School of Theology at Emory University, Brite Divinity School at Texas Christian University, the Graduate Institute of Theology at Yonseo University Seoul in South Korea, and the Ethiopian Graduate School of Theology (EGEST).

Mombo is a member of numerous ecumenical committees, including the World Council of Churches' Commission on Education and Ecumenical Formation, the All Africa Conference of Churches' Advisor on Education, Friends World Committee for Consultation, American Friends Service Committee, Gianchere High School in Kisii County, and Umoja High School in Kiambu County. Previously, she was a member of the Inter-Anglican Doctrinal and Theological Commission.

She has served as a trustee of the Programme for Christian-Muslim relations in Africa, member of the Circle of Concerned African Women Theologians and the coordinator of East African region installed as a Lay Canon Theologian at the Cathedral in 2017 and has served as a Lay Canon Theologian at Southwark Cathedral.

She is the founder of the Tamar campaign in Kenya which acknowledges prevalence of gender-based violence in society and empower churches to address it. She is a gender activist, working with religious organizations on issues of Gender and how patriarchy affects full participation of women in church and society.

== Awards and recognition ==
Mombo has received honorary Doctor of Divinity degrees from Virginia Theological Seminary (2007), Church Divinity School of the Pacific (2023) and her alma mater the University of Edinburgh (2023) for her work of bringing to the fore issues of gender disparity and gender justice in Church and society.

Mombo is recognized as one of the leading 20th century Anglican theologian in a book Twentieth Century Anglican Theologians: From Everlyn Underhill to Esther Mombo.

== Research and writing ==
Mombo is known for her research in missiology and HIV/AIDS thus her contention that in the context of HIV/AIDS and traditional rites of widow-inheritance, the church is challenged to offer more than just funeral services for the dead. The missiological challenges and opportunities she unravelled include: rethinking the relationship between gospel and culture in the era of HIV/AIDS; developing a theology and spirituality to cope with the growth of a countervailing prosperity gospel; ameliorating the root causes of poverty that lie at the heart of HIV/AIDS pandemic; and engaging in rigorous moral advocacy on behalf of those most vulnerable in the society.

Mombo is also known for championing for African women theology and examining how patriarchy affects full participation of women in church and society thus her philosophy, 'women are in pews men are at the pulpits'. This is so because of the existing strong link between theology and ordination. In Africa, theological education was an investment, and churches invested in men. Some churches also were not open to ordination of women, so they had no reason to send women to study theology. To her, Women's ordination in Africa plays a vital role in helping to overcome gender inequality, poverty, violence and HIV/AIDS as 'it provides an important place for women to contribute to the wellbeing of people in society.

As an African feminist theologian, Mombo propose that any theology that is going to be inclusive and global needs to interrogate the pervasive nature of patriarchy that continues to appear in church and society. Therefore, she advocated and raised her voice to building an inclusive Church where both men and women will see themselves as children of God.

== Selected works ==
- Mombo, E. (2022). A Conversation about COVID‐19 and the Ecumenical House. The Ecumenical Review, 74(3), 463-474.
- Mombo, E. (2021). Theological Education and Women. That all may live!: essays in honour of Nyambura J. Njoroge, 30, 31.
- Mombo, E. (2021). In Search of the Women in the Archival Sources. Christian Interculture: Texts and Voices from Colonial and Postcolonial Worlds, 63–78.
- Mombo, E. (2019). Considerations for an Inclusive Global Theological Education: Old Issues, New Questions. The Ecumenical Review, 71(4), 449–460.
- Mombo, E. (2019). Expressions and Encounters: Experiencing the Histories and Theologies of African Christianity in the Collections of Pitts Theology Library: A Visiting Scholar’s Reflection. Theological Librarianship, 12(1), 16–23.
- Mombo, E. (2019). The Role of the Invisible but Visible Women in the 1913 Kikuyu Conference. In Costly Communion (pp. 243–251). Brill.
- Mombo, E. (2019). The Singing Mysticism: Kenyan Quakerism, the Case of Gideon WH Mweresa. Quakers and Mysticism: Comparative and Syncretic Approaches to Spirituality, 201–219.
- Mombo, E. (2019). Understanding World Christianity: Eastern Africa, written by Paul Kollman and Cynthia Toms Smedley. Mission Studies, 36(2), 345–346.
- Mombo, E. (2017). Mission and evangelism. Christianity in sub-Saharan Africa, 461–477.
- Mombo, E. (2017). Reconciliatory Peace in the Face of Terror: A Personal Appeal for Quaker Peace Building in Kenya. Christian Responses to Terrorism: The Kenyan Experience. Edited by Gordon L. Heath and David K. Tarus. Eugene, OR: Wipf & Stock, 123–131.
- Mombo, E. (2016). The revival testimony of second wives. In The East African Revival (pp. 153–161). Routledge.
- Mombo, E. (2015). Women in African Christianities. In Routledge Companion to Christianity in Africa (pp. 173–185). Routledge.
- Mombo, E. (2013). Mentoring Younger Scholars in Theological Education in Africa. Handbook of Theological Education in Africa, 858–868.
- Mombo, E. (2010). From Fourfold Mission to Holistic Mission: Towards Edinburgh 2010. Holistic Mission: God’s Plan for God’s People, 37–46.
- Mombo, E. (2009). Christians and Sexuality in the time of AIDS. The Ecumenical Review, 61(3), 359.
- Mombo, E. (2008). Decent Care and HIV: A Holistic Approach. In Restoring Hope: Decent Care in the Midst of HIV/AIDS (pp. 96–101). London: Palgrave Macmillan UK.
- Mombo, E. (2008). The ordination of women in Africa: A historical perspective. Women and ordination in the Christian churches: international perspectives, 123-43.
- Mombo, E. (2005). Missiological challenges in the HIV/AIDS Era: Kenya. Theology today, 62(1), 58–66.
- Mombo, E. (2004). Why Women Bishops are Still on the Waiting List in Africa. Harris and Shaw (2004), 163–167.
- Mombo, E. (2000). Theological Education in Africa. Ministerial Formation, 89, 39–45.

=== Co-authored works ===
- Kabue, Samuel; Mombo, Esther; Galgalo, Joseph; Peter, C. B., eds. (2012). Disability, Society and Theology. Voices from Africa. Zapf Chancery. ISBN 978-9966-7341-7-4.
- Wafula, R. S.; Mombo, Esther; Wandera, Joseph, eds. (2016). The Postcolonial Church: Bible, Theology, and Mission. Borderless Press.
- Mombo, Esther; Nyiramana, Cecile (2019). Mending broken hearts, rebuilding shattered lives: Quaker peacebuilding in East and Central Africa. Quaker Books. ISBN 978-1-907123-95-5.
- Chirongoma, Sophia; Mombo, Esther, eds. (2021). Mother Earth, Postcolonial and Liberation Theologies. Fortress Academic. ISBN 978-1-9787-1161-7.
- Chitando, Ezra; Mombo, Esther; Gunda, Masiiwa Ragies, eds. (2021). That all may live! Essays in honour of Nyambura J. Njoroge. University of Bamberg Press. ISBN 9783863098117.
- Kaunda, Chammah J.; Longkumer, Atola; Ross, Kenneth R.; Mombo, Esther, eds. (2021). Christianity and COVID-19: Pathways for Faith. Routledge. ISBN 978-1-000-52229-7.
- Mombo, E. (Editor) (2020) A Malawi Church History 1860-2020, Mzuzu: Mzuni Press, 2020; co-edited with Chammah J. Kaunda, Atola Longkumer and Kenneth R. Ross
