= Zomba Thondwe Constituency =

Malawian electoral constituency

- First-past-the-post constituency for the Parliament of Malawi
- District: Zomba
- Region: Southern Region

Current constituency
- Party: DPP
- Member: Dumisani Lindani

Zomba Thondwe Constituency is a constituency for the National Assembly of Malawi, located in the Zomba District of Malawi's Southern Region. It is one of the 10 constituencies in the district that elects one member of parliament by the first past the post system.

The constituency has several wards, all electing councilors for the Zomba District. In 2019, the member of parliament who represented the constituency was Roseby Gadama. Annie Lemani Singani Anambewe was the MP in 2009.

Gadama lost this seat in the September 2025 election when she was beaten by Dumisani Lindani of the Democratic Progressive Party.

== Members of parliament ==
Elections	MP	Party	Notes	References
2004	Rev. Finley Dumbo Kamwendo Lemani	UDF	Multi-party system	
2009	Annie Lemani Singani Anambewe	DPP	Multi-party system	
2014	Charles Joseph Tikhiwa	DPP	Multi-party system	
2019	Roseby Gadama	Independent	Multi-party system	
2025	Dumisani Lindani	DPP	Multi-party system	
