= Salome Sifile Dlamini =

Missionary in Mmalawi from Eswatini

- Born: 1920; Manzini Region, Swaziland
- Died: 1994 (aged 73–74); Eswatini
- Occupation: church minister
- Known for: first woman minister in Malawi

Salome Sifile Dlamini (1920–1994) was a missionary from Eswatini who served in Malawi. In 1973, she became the first woman Christian minister in Malawi.

== Life ==
Sifile was born in 1920 at Egundvwini, Manzini in Swaziland. Her father died when she was very young, and her mother subsequentlybecame a Christian. While Sifile was still a child, a Norwegian American missionary named Malla Moe visited her area for several days. During this visit, Sifile told the missionaries that she also wished to become a Christian.

Sifile began attending school at Manzini and she became a confirmed Christian in 1938. In 1939 she heard the Scottish medical missionary Agnes Hynd speak about the need for the gospel in Tete (northwestern Mozambique). She went to Maphumulo in Natal in 1941 and took teacher's training. She taught at Manzini until in 1948 she went to Bible College for two years. She ministered at Idalia in southern Mpumalanga, South Africa, for a while and then pastored at her home. When she heard that the church was going to Nyasaland (Malawi), she remembered Agnes Hynd and decided to join them.

It was difficult learning the Chewa language at the Bangwe Bible College. There were only men preachers in Malawi and some would not come to hear her preach. She spoke at a Keswick Convention in England where some were surprised to see a black woman speaking.

She impressed the American missionary Rev. Maurice Hall and the students, with her contribution to the Bible College in Central Africa. She returned to Eswatini as her mother was ill and she was ordained in 1967 by General Superintendent Hugh C. Benner. She ministered in Eswatini and she worked with Dorothy Eby.

In 1973, she returned to Malawi for one more year as an ordained minister. She was the first African-born minister in Malawi. Over 25 years later Martha Mwale was the first woman to be ordained in Malawi by the Presbyterian church in 1999.

From 1974 to 1978 she taught at the Nazarene Bible College at Siteki. Then she joined the literature program in Manzini, translating and producing church literature. Rev. Salome Dlamini retired in 1990 and she died in 1994.
