= Church of Central Africa Presbyterian – Harare Synod =

Synod of the Church of Central Africa Presbyterian

Harare Synod
- Classification: Protestant
- Polity: Presbyterian
- Associations: Part of Church of Central Africa Presbyterian
- Region: Zimbabwe
- Origin: 1965
- Congregations: 25
- Members: 10,000
- Official website: www.ccaphresynod.com

The Church of Central Africa Presbyterian – Harare Synod was founded in 1965 by immigrant workers from Malawi in search of employment in mining and farming areas in Zimbabwe. Ministers came from Malawi and South Africa. Worships are in English, Shona, Chewa and Ndebele. The Harare Synod is part of the Church of Central Africa Presbyterian. It also has cordial relationship with other Reformed churches.

It has 25 parishes with approximately 10,000 members in four presbyteries. The churches met every two years as a Synod.

== Doctrine ==
- Apostles Creed
- Athanasian Creed
- Nicene Creed
- Canons of Dort
- Heidelberg Catechism
