= Maggie Madimbo =

Malawian educator and academic administrator

Maggie Madimbo is a Malawian educator and academic administrator. She has served as Vice-Chancellor of African Bible College in Lilongwe, Malawi. Her work focuses on higher education leadership, female leadership development, and Christian education. She also the board chairperson of the Forum for African Women Educationalists in Malawi (FAWEMA).

== Education ==
Madimbo obtained a Bachelor of Arts in Biblical Studies with a Minor in Christian Education from African Bible College, Malawi, and a master's degree in Christian Education from Nairobi International School of Theology, Kenya. In 2013, she obtained her PhD in Organizational Leadership (concentration in Higher Education) from Eastern University, Pennsylvania, USA.

== Academic and administrative career ==
Maggie has held various academic roles at African Bible College, including Lecturer, Head of Education Department, Acting Academic Dean, Dean of Women, and Dean of Admissions. In May 2013, she has been Vice-Chancellor of African Bible College, Lilongwe, Malawi. She has also served as adjunct professor at Eastern University, Pennsylvania.

== Published work ==
Madimbo has published works including Transformative & Engaging Leadership: Lessons from Indigenous African Women, which discusses leadership strategies employed by women leaders in Malawi.
