= Nkhoma (hill) =

- Location in Malawi
- Coordinates: 14°2′55.62″S 34°6′24.21″E
- Country: Malawi
- Region: Central Region
- District: Lilongwe District
- Elevation: 3,914 ft (1,193 m)
- Time zone: +2

Nkhoma is a hill in the Lilongwe District of Malawi. South African missionaries established a mission in 1889 and named the mission after the hill.

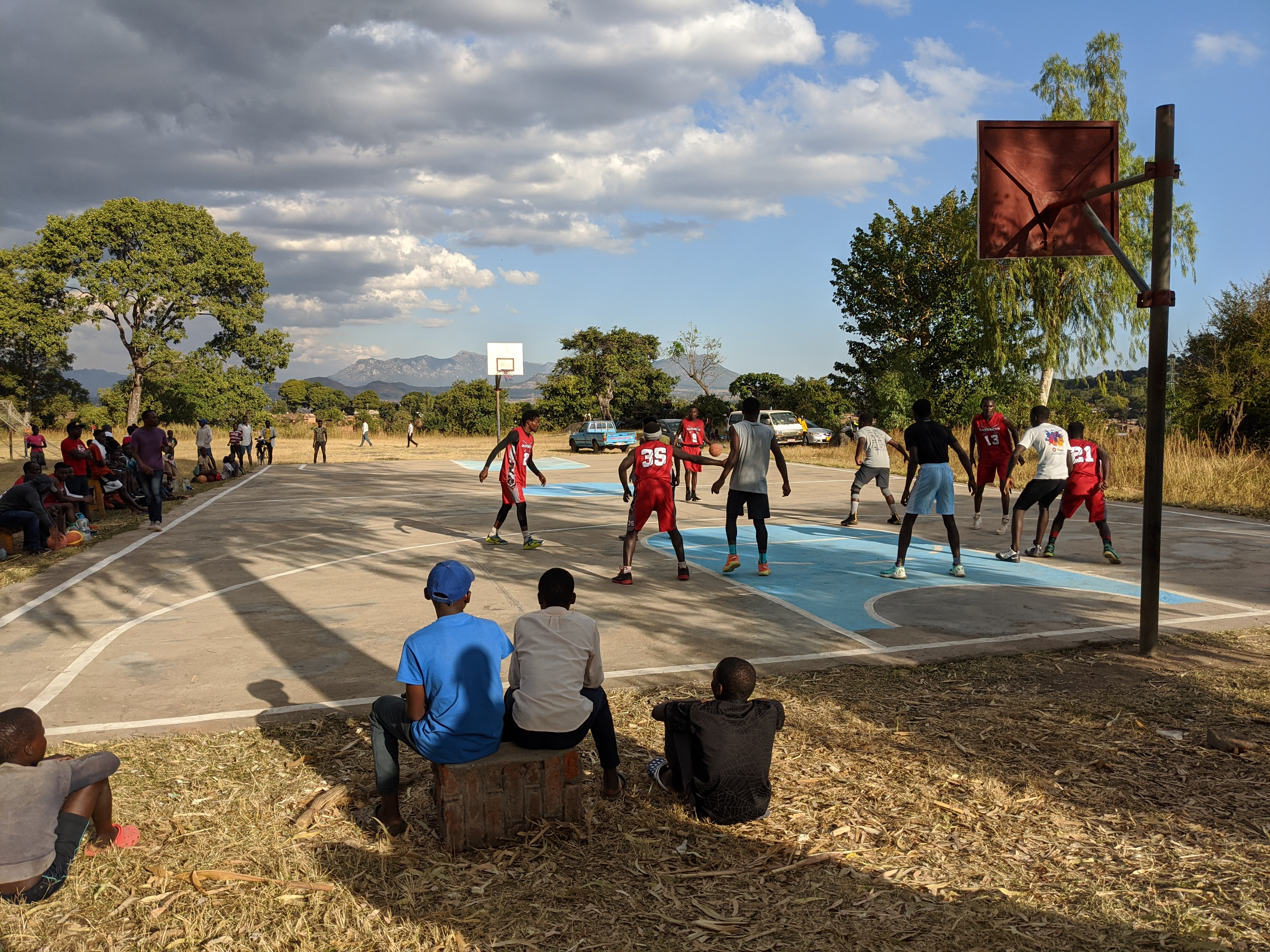
Basketball club in Nkhoma.

Nowadays, Nkhoma still hosts the Church of Central Africa Presbyterian - Nkhoma Synod and several affiliated institutions:

- Nkhoma Institute for Continued Theological Training (also known as Josophat Mwale Theological Institute)
- Nkhoma Hospital
- Nkhoma College of Nursing

Nkhoma is also a surname common among the Chewa and Tumbuka people. All those that have this last name can trace their ancestors' migration route through the Dedza area in the 17th century. The name is common in the Eastern province of Zambia especially in Chipata and Lundazi.
