= Church of Central Africa Presbyterian =

Presbyterian Christian denomination

Presbyterian Church of Central Africa
- Classification: Protestant
- Orientation: Reformed Christianity
- Theology: Calvinist
- Governance: Presbyterian
- Associations: World Council of Churches (Note: Each Synod participates in ecumenical organizations independently. Only the Blantyre Synod is a member of the World Council of Churches.) World Communion of Reformed Churches
- Region: Malawi, Zambia, Zimbabwe and Mozambique
- Origin: 1924
- Branched from: Church of Scotland, Free Church of Scotland and Dutch Reformed Church in South Africa (NGK)
- Congregations: 1,366 (2024)
- Members: 3,128,574 (2024)
- Ministers: 534 (2024)
- Official website: www.ccapblantyresynod.org

The Church of Central Africa Presbyterian (CCAP) is a Presbyterian denomination. It consists of five synods: one in Zambia (Zambia Synod), one in Zimbabwe (Harare Synod) and three in Malawi – Livingstonia Synod in the north of the country, Nkhoma Synod in the centre, and Blantyre Synod in the south.

The CCAP is the largest Protestant denomination in Malawi.

== History ==
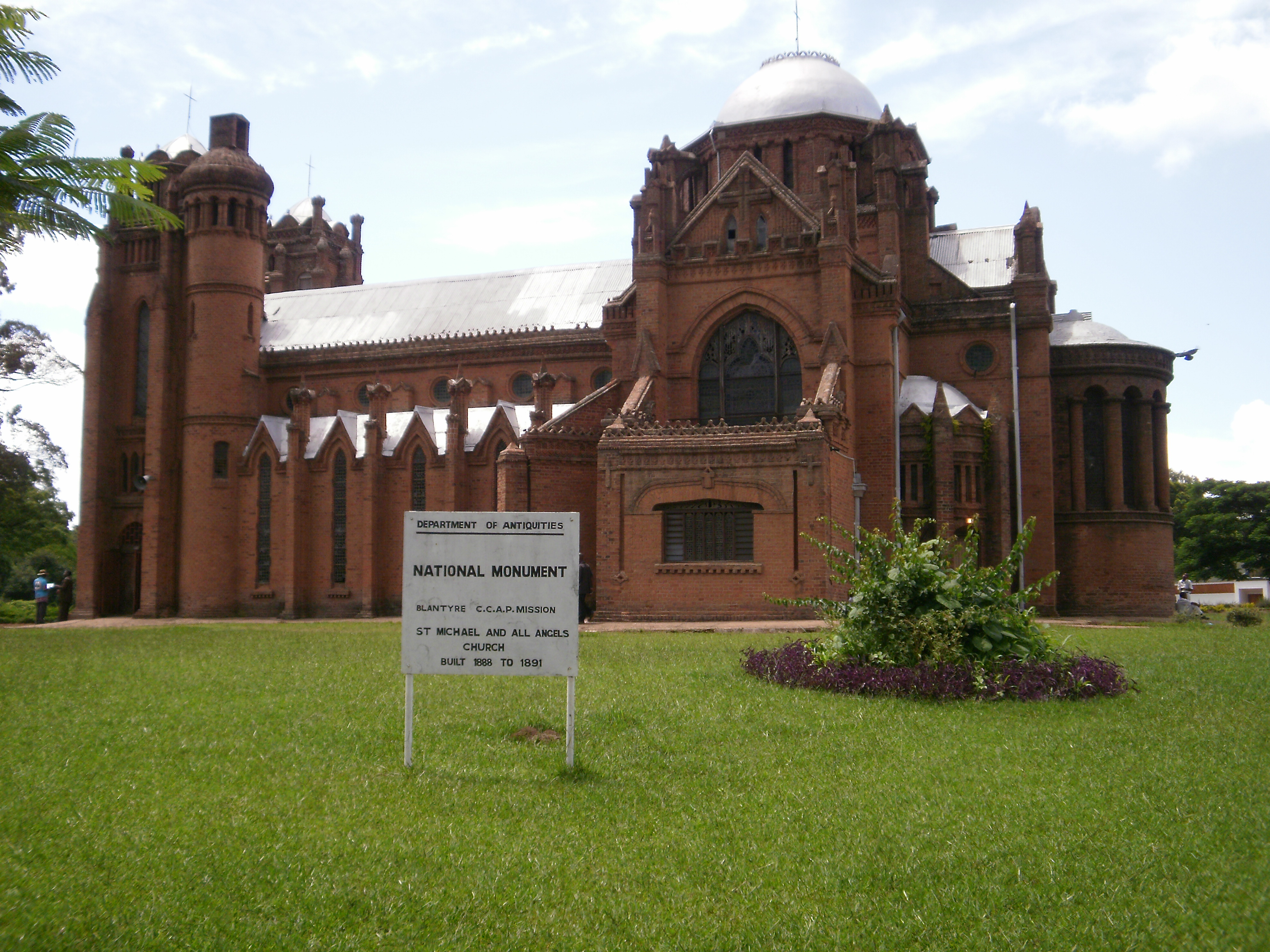
St Michael and All Angels is a CCAP church in Blantyre.

Following the arrival of David Livingstone, Scottish Presbyterian churches established missions in Malawi. In 1875, the Free Church of Scotland established itself in northern Malawi with headquarters in Livingstonia, while in 1876 the Church of Scotland set up a mission in Blantyre. In 1889 the Cape Synod of the Dutch Reformed Church in South Africa began work in central Malawi. Initially its base was Mvera, but it later relocated to Nkhoma. These three missions were the start of the three CCAP synods in Malawi.

In 1911 the Livingstonia and Blantyre Synods agreed to join together to form the CCAP although, because of World War I, this union did not take place until 17 September 1924. The CCAP at that time had 28 ministers (about half of whom were African) and 32 elders (almost all of whom were African).

In 1926, the formerly Dutch Reformed Nkhoma Synod joined the CCAP. The Harare Synod joined in 1965, while the Lundazi Synod (now called the Zambia Synod) joined in 1984.

In 1993, the Blantyre Synod issued a statement which acknowledged historically close ties with the Malawi Congress Party (MCP) so that "the church gradually lost its ability to admonish or speak pastorally to the government" and indicated that they did "not want to make the same mistake at this time in order to ensure that the church retains its prophetic voice throughout the coming years of our country's history."

In 1998, some Charismatic members split from the CCAP to form the Presbyterian Church of Malawi (PCM).

The CCAP entered into a high-profile public feud with Malawian Second Vice President Chakufwa Chihana in 2004 after Chihana told the church not to "meddle" in politics. In April 2020 Lilongwe MP Esther Kathumba and Monica Chang'anamuno went to court over the legality of the measures brought in by the President to deal with the COVID-19 pandemic. They brought the "Kathumba v. President of Malawi" case with the Church and Society Program of the Church of Central Africa Presbyterian – Synod of Livingstonia. Kathumba argued that the President's declaration of a State of National Disaster in March and the announcement by the Minister of Health of a three week lockdown (a few days before) was unconstitutional. Three judges agreed with Kathumba that the measures were outside the constitution because they were a significant change to the freedoms given by the constitution and because the President has not declared "a State of Emergency". Moreover they volunteered that the freedom of conscience, belief, thought and religion can never be derogated.

In 2024 the church celebrated its centenary and Shaw Paterson, who was that year's Church of Scotland's moderator, visited. He opened a replaced bridge in Thondwe lost to floods. Thondwe is a community twinned with a similar church in Scotland.

== Statistics ==
Synod	Congregations	Members	Pastors	Year
Blantyre (Southern Malawi)	800	1,800,000	185	2016
Nkhoma (Central Malawi)	235	1,000,000	238	2024
Livingstonia (Northern Malawi)	214	200,000	-	2024
Zambia	89	120,000	89	2024
Zimbabwe	28	8,574	22	2018
Total	1,366	3,128,574	534	2016-2024

In 2018, the Malawi Census recorded 2,498,969 people who self-identified as church members.

In 2022, a survey by the Afrobarometer reported that 15% of Malawi's population identified as Presbyterian. This corresponded to approximately 3,085,309 people that year. In 2020, according to Afrobarometer, 1.3% of Zambia's population described itself as Presbyterian, which corresponded to 247,772 people.

In 2024, the church's own synods reported a total of 3.1 million members (including Malawi, Zambia and Zimbabwe), 103 presbyteries and 5 synods.

== Governance ==
The CCAP has a Secretary General. In 2025 the Secretary General was Re. Dr. Mwawi N. Chilongozi.

== Beliefs ==
The Nkhoma Synod have adopted the Belgic Confession, Heidelberg Catechism, and Canons of Dort as their doctrinal standards. The Zambia Synod subscribes to these and to the Gallican Confession, Scots Confession, Second Helvetic Confession, Thirty-Nine Articles, and Westminster Confession.

== Synods ==
- Blantyre Synod (southern Malawi)
- Nkhoma Synod (central Malawi)
- Synod of Livingstonia (northern Malawi)
- Synod of Zambia (Zambia)
- Harare Synod (Zimbabwe)

== Interchurch Relations ==
The denomination is a member of the World Council of Churches and World Communion of Reformed Churches. (Note: Each Synod participates in ecumenical organizations independently. The synods of Blantyre, Nkhoma, Zambia, and Harare are members of the World Communion of Reformed Churches, while the Livingstonia synod is the only non-member.)

== See also ==
- Central Africa
