= Church of Central Africa Presbyterian – Nkhoma Synod =

Synod of the Church of Central Africa Presbyterian

Nkhoma Synod
- Classification: Protestant
- Polity: Presbyterian
- Associations: Part of Church of Central Africa Presbyterian
- Region: Central Malawi
- Origin: 1889
- Official website: https://nkhomasynod.blogspot.com

The Church of Central Africa Presbyterian – Nkhoma Synod was founded in 1889 and is one of the major Protestant churches in Malawi. The Church consists of 124 congregations and 1,298 prayer houses and serves 800,000 members. The churches meet every two years in a synod. They have adopted the Belgic Confession, Heidelberg Catechism and Canons of Dort as their doctrinal standards. Along with the General Synod of the CCAP, the Nkhoma Synod is a member of the World Communion of Reformed Churches.

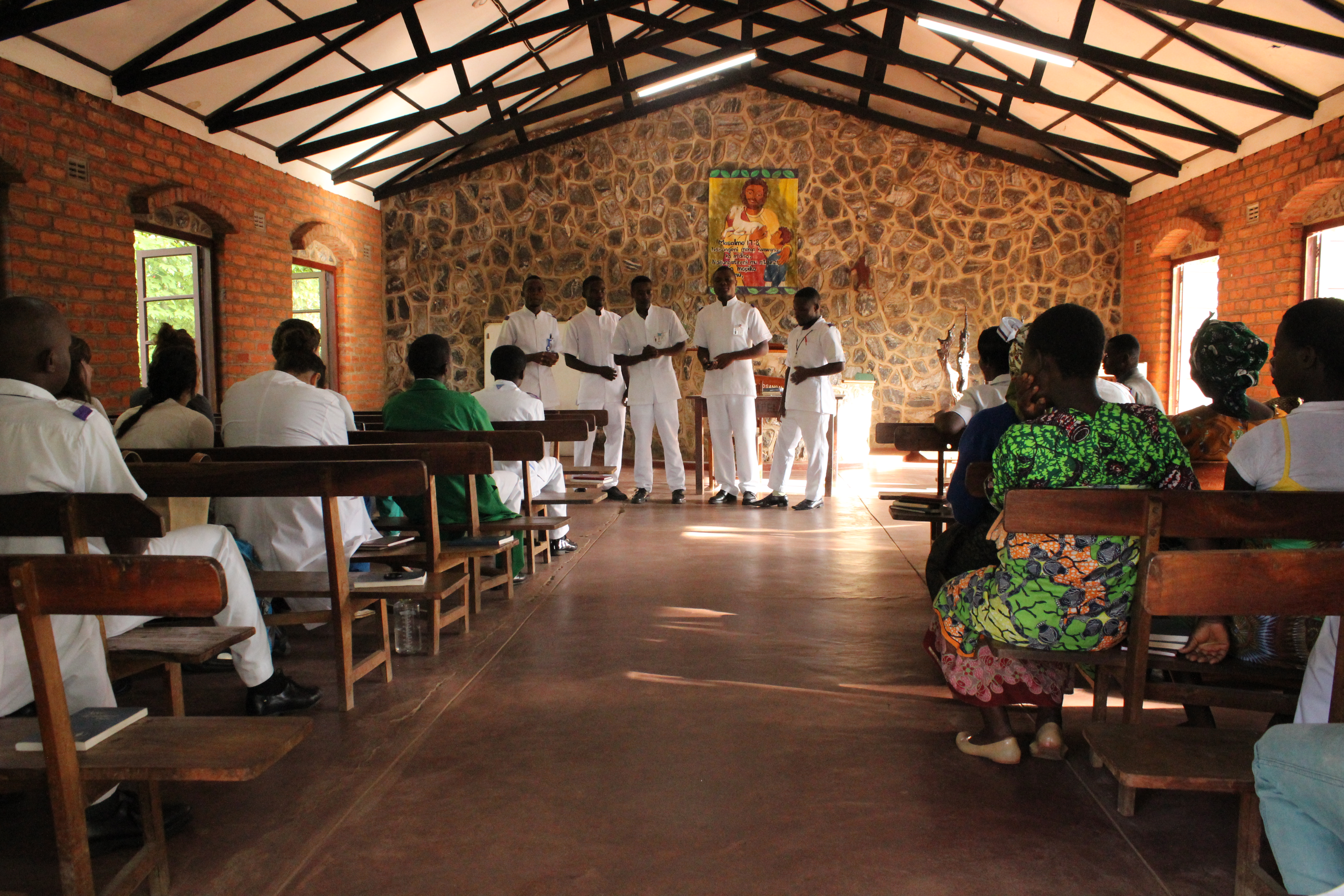
Nurses singing at Nkhoma Mission Hospital.

The Church maintains the Nkhoma Institute for Continued Theological Training, and along with its sister synods, Zomba Theological University.

CCAP Nkhoma Synod Health Department covers the central area of Malawi and comprises Nkhoma Hospital, 11 health centres and the Nkhoma College of Nursing. Nkhoma Hospital is a 220-bed health facility, located in the town of Nkhoma, about 55 kilometers from Lilongwe, Malawi's capital. Nkhoma Synod HIV/AIDS Community Program was established in January 2000 in response to the growing HIV/AIDS epidemic.

The Reformed Church in America established partner relations with the Nkhoma Synod from 2016.
