= Church of Central Africa Presbyterian – Synod of Livingstonia =

Synod of the Church of Central Africa Presbyterian

Synod of Livingstonia
- Classification: Protestant
- Polity: Presbyterian
- Associations: Part of Church of Central Africa Presbyterian
- Region: Northern Malawi
- Origin: 1875
- Congregations: 170
- Members: 200,000
- Official website: http://www.ccapsolinia.org/

The Synod of Livingstonia is a synod of the Church of Central Africa Presbyterian. It was founded by missionaries of the Free Church of Scotland in 1875.

== Organisation ==
The Livingstonia Synod is located in Northern Malawi, and claims about 25% of the population of that region. It has 170 congregations, about 1,000 prayer houses and 200,000 adult members.

It has 24 presbyteries, namely Bandawe, Champira, Chitipa, Dwangwa, Ekwendeni, Engalaweni, Euthini, Henga, Johannesburg, Jombo, Karonga, Lilongwe, Livingstonia, Loudon, Luwerezi, Milala, Misuku, Mpasazi, Mzalangwe, Mzuzu, Ngerenge, Njuyu, Nkhata Bay, Rumphi and Wenya. The Synod office is located in Mzuzu.

== History ==
It was founded by missionaries of the Free Church of Scotland in 1875.

In 1954 Engcongolweni primary school opened and it was organised by the Synod of Livingstonia. The school has had over 600 pupils.

The Synod of Livingstonia ordained the Rev. Martha Mwale. She was the first woman to be ordained in Malawi by the Presbyterian church in 2000 or 2001.

== Education ==
The Livingstonia Synod provide education is partnership with others. There are two colleges, four special needs schools 850 primary schools and seven secondary schools. The seven secondary schools are Ekwendeni Girls Secondary School, Robert Laws Secondary School, Bandawe Girls Secondary School, Karonga Girls Secondary School, Elangeni Secondary School, Amazing Grace Secondary School and Kapoka Secondary School

== Doctrine ==
- Apostles' Creed
- Nicene Creed
- Brief Statement of Faith (1924)
- Westminster Confession of Faith
- Westminster Larger Catechism
- Westminster Shorter Catechism
