= List of districts of Malawi by Human Development Index =

This is a list of Districts of Malawi by Human Development Index as of 2023.

Rank	District	HDI (2023)
Medium human development
1	Blantyre	0.584
2	North (Chitipa, Karonga, Rumphi, Nkhata Bay)	0.558
3	Mzimba	0.554
Low human development
4	Kasungu	0.541
5	Lilongwe	0.526
6	Zomba	0.525
–	Malawi (average)	0.517
7	Mulanje	0.512
8	Balaka, Mwanza, Phalombe, Chiradzulu, Chikwawa, Nsanje, Neno	0.504
9	Nkhotakota, Mchinji, Dowa, Ntchisi, Dedza, Ntcheu	0.494
10	Machinga	0.492
11	Salima	0.490
12	Thyolo	0.489
13	Mangochi	0.467

== See also ==
- List of countries by Human Development Index
