= ISO 3166-2:MW =

Entry for Malawi in ISO 3166-2

ISO 3166-2:MW is the entry for Malawi in ISO 3166-2, part of the ISO 3166 standard published by the International Organization for Standardization (ISO), which defines codes for the names of the principal subdivisions (e.g., provinces or states) of all countries coded in ISO 3166-1.

Currently for Malawi, ISO 3166-2 codes are defined for two levels of subdivisions:

- three regions
- 28 districts

Each code consists of two parts separated by a hyphen. The first part is MW, the ISO 3166-1 alpha-2 code of Malawi. The second part is either of the following:

- one letter: regions
- two letters: districts

== Current codes ==
Subdivision names are listed as in the ISO 3166-2 standard published by the ISO 3166 Maintenance Agency (ISO 3166/MA).

ISO 639-1 codes are used to represent subdivision names in the following administrative languages:

- (en): English
- (ny): Chichewa

Click on the button in the header to sort each column.

=== Regions ===
Code	Subdivision name (ny)	Subdivision name (en)
MW-N	Chakumpoto	Northern Region
MW-S	Chakumwera	Southern Region
MW-C	Chapakati	Central Region

=== Districts ===
Code	Subdivision name (ny, en)	In region
MW-BA	Balaka	S
MW-BL	Blantyre	S
MW-CK	Chikwawa	S
MW-CR	Chiradzulu	S
MW-CT	Chitipa	N
MW-DE	Dedza	C
MW-DO	Dowa	C
MW-KR	Karonga	N
MW-KS	Kasungu	C
MW-LK	Likoma	N
MW-LI	Lilongwe	C
MW-MH	Machinga	S
MW-MG	Mangochi	S
MW-MC	Mchinji	C
MW-MU	Mulanje	S
MW-MW	Mwanza	S
MW-MZ	Mzimba	N
MW-NE	Neno	S
MW-NB	Nkhata Bay	N
MW-NK	Nkhotakota	C
MW-NS	Nsanje	S
MW-NU	Ntcheu	C
MW-NI	Ntchisi	C
MW-PH	Phalombe	S
MW-RU	Rumphi	N
MW-SA	Salima	C
MW-TH	Thyolo	S
MW-ZO	Zomba	S

== Changes ==
The following changes to the entry have been announced in newsletters by the ISO 3166/MA since the first publication of ISO 3166-2 in 1998:

Newsletter	Date issued	Description of change in newsletter	Code/Subdivision change
Newsletter I-2	2002-05-21	Addition of three districts. List source updated	Subdivisions added: MW-BA Balaka; MW-LK Likoma Island; MW-PH Phalombe
Newsletter II-2	2010-06-30	Addition of the country code prefix as the first code element, addition of names in administrative languages, typographical error correction, update of the administrative structure and of the list source	Subdivisions added: MW-NE Neno

== See also ==
- Subdivisions of Malawi
- FIPS region codes of Malawi
- Neighbouring countries: MZ, TZ, ZM
