= Islam in Malawi =

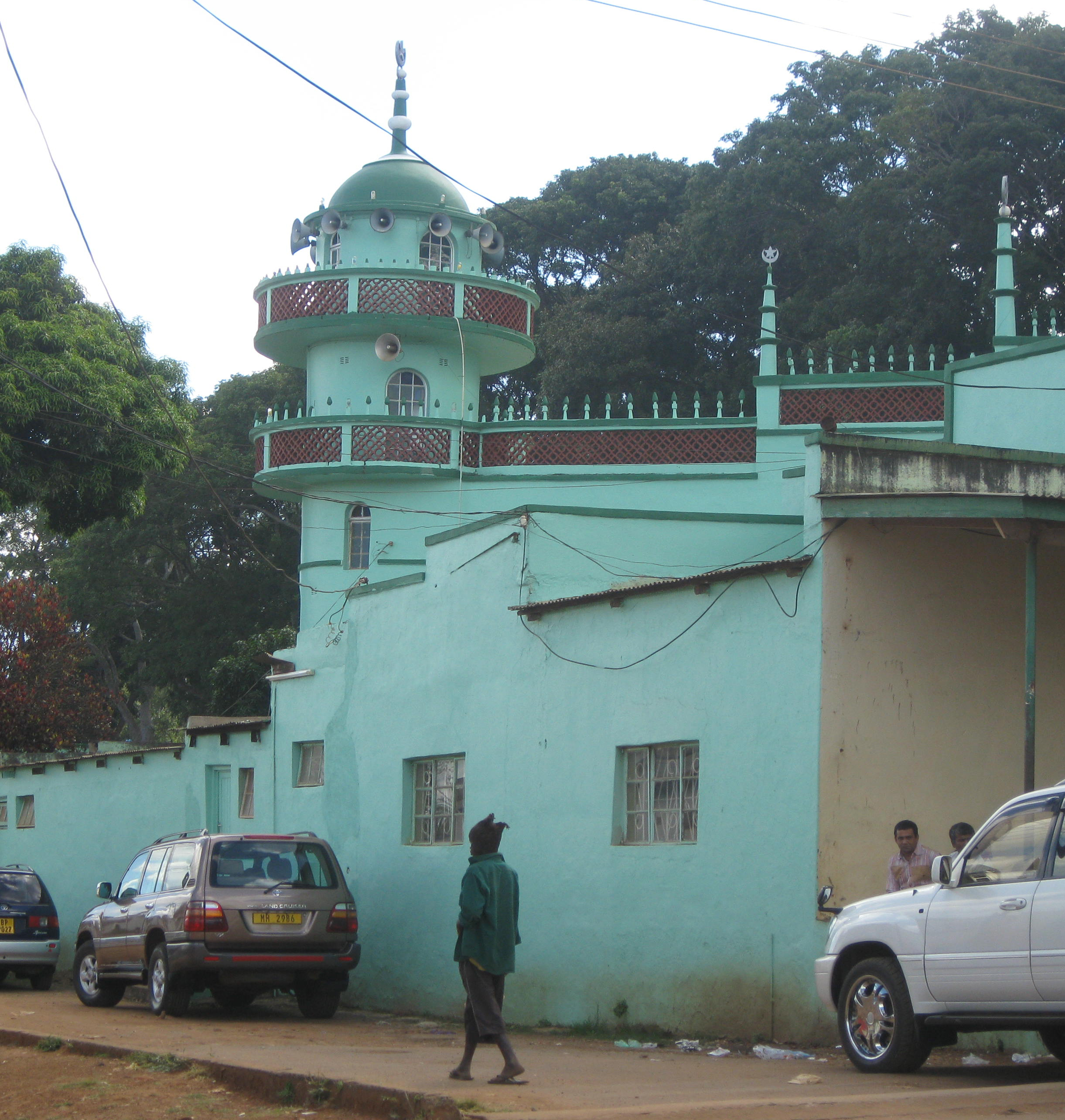
A mosque in Zomba

Islam is the second largest religion in Malawi behind Malawi Christian. Nearly all of Malawi's Muslims adhere to Sunni Islam. Though difficult to assess, according to the CIA Factbook, in 2018 about 13.8% of the country's population was Muslim. Muslim organisations in the country claim a figure of 15-20%. According to the latest census (2018), Muslims make up 13.8% (2,426,754) of the country's population. According to the Malawi Religion Project run by the University of Pennsylvania, in 2010 approximately 19.6% of the population was Muslim, concentrated mostly in the Southern Region.

== History ==
Islam arrived in Malawi with the Arab and Swahili traders who traded in ivory, gold and later on slaves beginning from 15th century. It is also argued that Islam first arrived in Malawi through traders from the Kilwa Sultanate. Two Muslim teachers, Shayhks Abdallah Mkwanda and Sabiti Ngaunje, also played an important role in the spread of Islam. According to UNESCO, the first mosque was built by Swahili-Arab ivory traders.

During the colonial era, the authorities in the country feared that Islam posed the greatest threat, as an ideology of resistance, to their rule. This view was shared by Christian missionaries, who greatly feared that Islam could unite Africans in hostilities and uprisings against colonial rule.

The Yao converted to Islam in the 19th century, comprising the largest Muslim group in Malawi since. Some Chewa also converted to Islam during the same period.

The 1970s witnessed the start of an Islamic revival among Muslims in Malawi, as well as among Muslims across the globe. Recently, Muslim groups have engaged in missionary work in Malawi. Much of this is performed by the African Muslim Agency, based in Kuwait. The Kuwait-sponsored AMA has translated the Qur'an into Chichewa (Cinyanja), one of the official languages of Malawi, and has engaged in other missionary work in the country. There are thought to be about 800 jumu'ah mosques in the country, with at least one or two to be found in nearly every town. There are also several Islamic schools and a broadcasting station called Radio Islam. A major Muslim center of learning exists in Mpemba, outside of Blantyre, funded mainly by money from Saudi Arabia and Kuwait.

== Demography ==
A large number of Muslims in Malawi come from the Yao people, who are described as "the most important source of Islam in the country". Even before their conversion to Islam, many Yao chiefs used Swahili Muslims as scribes and advisers. As a result of their strong trading contacts with Swahili-Arabs, many Yao adopted Islam and the two groups had cases of intermarriages in the past. The Yao form the largest majority south and east of Lake Malawi. Muslims can also be found among other groups, such as the lakeside Chewa people and Indian and other Asian Malawians. Muslims in the country have been described as a "vocal and powerful community."

In general, most Malawian Muslims are Sunni. According to a source, 72 percent of Muslims are ethnic Yao and 16 percent are ethnic Chewa. Most Muslims of African descent in Malawi are Sunni and belong to the Shafi'i madhhab. Meanwhile, Muslims of Asian descent in Malawi are also mostly Sunni and belong to the Hanafi madhhab. Additionally, there is a small number of Shiites among people of Lebanese origin in Malawi.

According to the 2018 census, over half of Malawian Muslims live in Mangochi and Machinga district. Muslims comprised 72.6% of the population in Mangochi district and 66.9% of the population in Machinga.

== Distribution ==
Distribution of Muslims in Malawi (2018 Census)
Area	Muslim Population	Total Population	Muslim Percentage
Malawi	2,426,754	17,563,749	13.82%
Northern	31,571	2,289,780	1.38%
Chitipa	181	234,927	0.08%
Karonga	5,035	365,028	1.38%
Nkhata Bay	3,079	284,681	1.08%
Rumphi	2,957	229,161	1.29%
Mzimba	10,996	940,184	1.17%
Likoma	329	14,527	2.26%
Mzuzu City	8,994	221,272	4.06%
Central	516,200	7,523,340	6.86%
Kasungu	18,769	842,953	2.23%
Nkhotakota	94,487	393,077	24.04%
Ntchisi	1,556	317,069	0.49%
Dowa	7,038	772,569	0.91%
Salima	146,605	478,346	30.65%
Lilongwe	27,992	1,637,583	1.71%
Mchinji	14,200	602,305	2.36%
Dedza	78,868	830,512	9.50%
Ntcheu	15,987	659,608	2.42%
Lilongwe City	110,698	989,318	11.19%
Southern	1,878,983	7,750,629	24.24%
Mangochi	834,644	1,148,611	72.67%
Machinga	492,560	735,438	66.98%
Zomba	147,123	746,724	19.70%
Chiradzulu	40,342	356,875	11.30%
Blantyre	35,955	451,220	7.97%
Mwanza	1,678	130,949	1.28%
Thyolo	15,291	721,456	2.12%
Mulanje	38,135	684,107	5.57%
Phalombe	7,867	429,450	1.83%
Chikwawa	9,451	564,684	1.67%
Nsanje	5,825	299,168	1.95%
Balaka	152,298	438,379	34.74%
Neno	2,029	138,291	1.47%
Zomba City	14,877	105,013	14.17%
Blantyre City	80,908	800,264	10.11%

== List of Muslims ==
- Bakili Muluzi, the first (and only) freely elected President of Malawi from 1994 to 2004.
- Sidik Mia, minister in the Tonse Alliance administration elected in the 2020 Malawian presidential election and died in 2021.
- Cassim Chilumpha is a prominent politician that has served as Vice-President of Malawi. Atupele Muluzi, son of Bakili Muluzi, is also a notable politician who is Muslim.

== See also ==
- Islam in Africa
- Religion in Malawi
