= Subdivisions of Malawi =

Malawi is divided into 28 districts and four independent city councils (in bold below) within three regions:

**Northern Region**

- 1 – Chitipa
- 2 – Karonga
- 7 – Likoma
- 4 – Mzimba
- 5 – **Mzuzu**
- 6 – Nkhata Bay
- 3 – Rumphi
**Central Region**

- 16 – Dedza
- 11 – Dowa
- 8 – Kasungu
- 13 – **Lilongwe**
- 14 – Lilongwe (Rural)
- 12 – Mchinji
- 9 – Nkhotakota
- 17 – Ntcheu
- 10 – Ntchisi
- 15 – Salima
**Southern Region**

- 19 – Balaka
- 25 – **Blantyre**
- 23 – Blantyre (Rural)
- 24 – Chikwawa
- 28 – Chiradzulu
- 20 – Machinga
- 18 – Mangochi
- 30 – Mulanje
- 22 – Mwanza
- 21 – Neno
- 32 – Nsanje
- 31 – Thyolo
- 29 – Phalombe
- 26 – **Zomba**
- 27 – Zomba (Rural)
