= Makuta =

Makuta may refer to:

- Makuṭa, royal headgear in Southeast Asia
- Makuta (drum), tall cylindrical or barrel-shaped Afro-Cuban drums
- Makuta VFX, Indian visual effects and animation company in California
- Makuta, Botswana, a village
- Makuta, Malawi, a village
- Makuta Station, a train station in Kisarazu, Chiba Prefecture, Japan
- Manuha (a.k.a. Makuta), the last king of the Thaton Kingdom
- Makuta, a denomination of the Zairean zaire
- Makuta, the main antagonist in Bionicle
