= Machinga =

Machinga may refer to:

- Machinga people, a Bantu ethnic group in Tanzania
- Machinga language, a dialect of Makonde language in Tanzania
- Machinga District, in Malawi
  - Machinga, the capital of the district
