= Salui, Malawi =

Salui
- Village
- Location in Malawi
- Coordinates: 13°24′S 34°19′E
- Country: Malawi
- Region: Central Region
- District: Salima District

Population (2011)
  - Total: 800
- Time zone: +2

Salui is a small fishing village on the western shore of Lake Malawi. In 2011, the population of the village was estimated at 800.

== Economy ==
The villagers grow rice, sugar cane, and corn using water from Lake Malawi. The soil is sandy at the beach area, but turns to a clay/loam within a few hundred meters of the shoreline, enabling the creation of patties for rice growth. Dugout canoe-type boats are used by the local fishermen, as well as fishing barrier/walls and nets for communal or group fishing.

== Landmarks ==
The village consists of an estimated 100 straw and mud-straw huts of traditional Malawian construction separated into three small groups by drainage or irrigation areas. A single Baptist church serves the village. As of June 2011 the church pastor was Abusa (Pastor) Nathan.

== Transport and facilities ==
The village is accessible by an improved, single-lane dirt road which extends east from the two-lane, asphalt-surface route M5. The M5 serves as a major artery between the two larger town/cities nearby; Salima to the south, and Mzuzu to the north.

The village does not have access to electricity or running water. Salui is home to many orphaned children, most likely as a result of a large number of adult deaths due to HIV infection.
