= District commissioner =

District commissioner may refer to:

- District Commissioner (British Colonial), a rank in the British Colonial Service
- District Commissioner (film), a 1963 documentary film
- District Commissioner (Malawi)
- District Commissioner (Scouting)

== See also ==
- Deputy commissioner (India)
