= Religion in Malawi =

Religion in Malawi (Pew Research Center 2020)
1. Christianity (87.4%)
2. Islam (11.6%)
3. Other (1.00%)

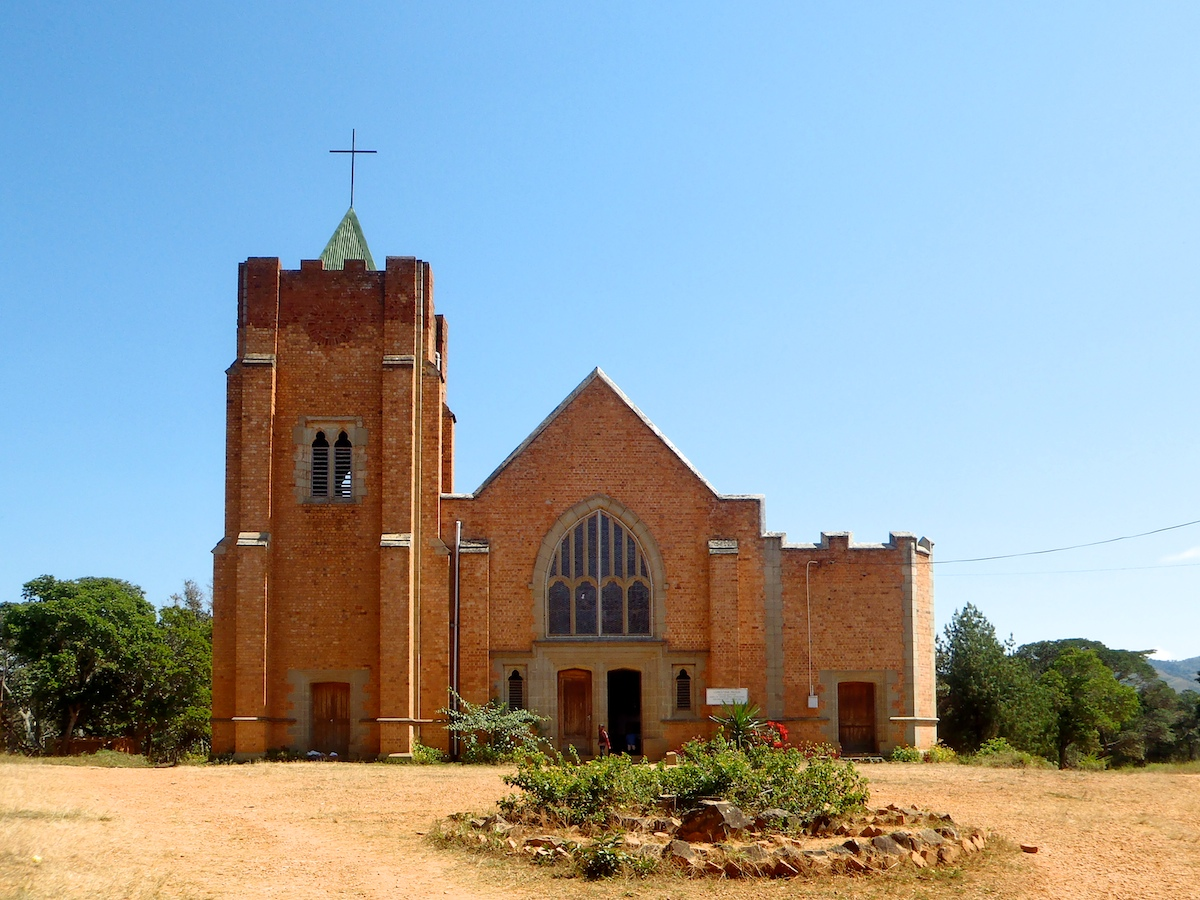
St. Helen's Cathedral in Livingstonia

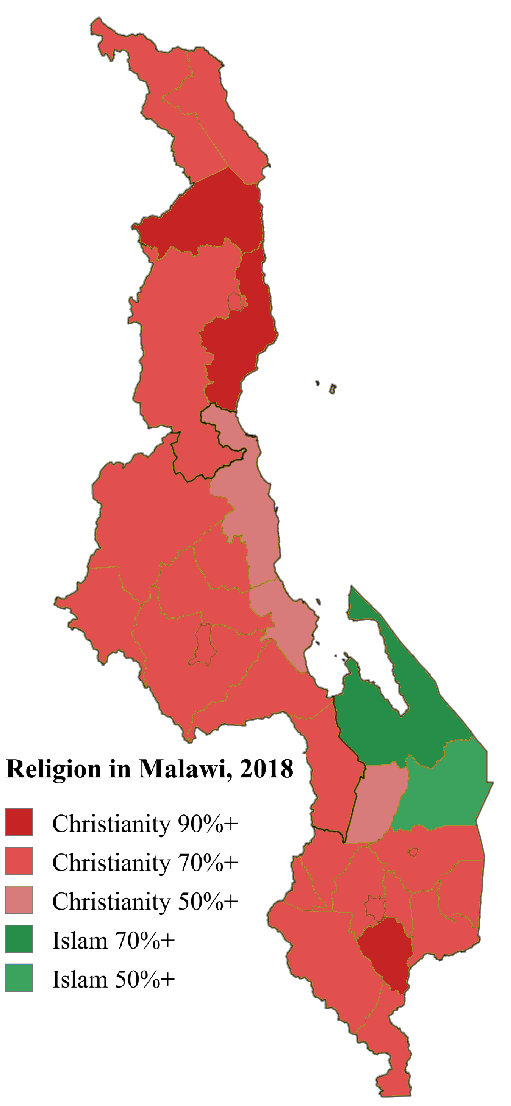
Dominant religion by district in Malawi, 2018

Christianity is the most widely professed religion in Malawi, with significant populations of the adherents of Islam and traditional faiths. Religious pluralism is both a prominent social value and enshrined in the country's constitution.

Malawi is a secular state. The Christian festivals of Christmas and Good Friday are recognised as national holidays.

== Demographics ==
Malawi is a majority Christian country, with a significant Muslim minority. Government surveys indicate that 87% of the country is Christian, with a minority 11.6% Muslim population. According to the World Religion Database, Protestants made up the largest group of Christians in 2020. The largest Christian churches in Malawi are the Roman Catholic Church, of which 36.3% of Malawians are adherents, and the Church of Central Africa Presbyterian (CCAP) to which 18% belong. The CCAP is the largest Protestant denomination in Malawi with 1.3 million members. There are smaller Presbyterian denominations like the Reformed Presbyterian Church of Malawi and the Evangelical Presbyterian Church of Malawi. There are also smaller numbers of Anglicans, Baptists, evangelicals, Seventh-day Adventists, and the Lutherans.

Most of the Muslim population is Sunni, of either the Shafi'i or Hanafi groups.

Other religious groups within the country include Presbyterians, Seventh-day Adventist, Anglicans and Pentecostals, Rastafari, Hindus, Baháʼís, (0.23%) and a small number of Jews and Sikhs; atheists make up around 2% of the population.

== Legal status ==
The constitution of Malawi prohibits discrimination based on religion and provides for freedom of conscience, religion, belief, and thought. It also specifies that eliminating religious intolerance is a goal of education in Malawi.

Religious instruction is mandatory in public primary schools, with no opt-out provision, and is available as an elective in public secondary schools. In some schools, the religious curriculum is a Christian-oriented “Bible knowledge” course, while in others it is an interfaith “moral and religious education” course drawing from the Christian, Islamic, Hindu, and Baháʼí faiths. According to the law, local school management committees, elected at parent-teacher association meetings, decide on which religious curriculum to use. Private Christian and Islamic schools offer religious instruction in their respective faiths. Hybrid “grant-aided” schools are managed by private, usually religious, institutions, but their teaching staffs are paid by the government. In exchange for this financial support, the government chooses a significant portion of the students who attend. At grant-aided schools, a board appointed by the school's operators decides whether the “Bible knowledge” or the “moral and religious education” curriculum will be used.

Rastafarian children face obstacles to obtaining education, as school children in Malawi are generally required to shave their heads, and Rastafarian religious practice requires them to wear dreadlocks. This has resulted in several Rastafarian children being denied access to public schools, although the majority concede to shaving their heads and complying with the school's rules. Litigation is ongoing in 2023, but in the meantime, a High Court injunction was issued in 2020, compelling the Ministry of Education to allow all Rastafarian children to be enrolled in government schools. The MOE is also looking at a policy for Muslim children who wish to wear a hijab.

In 2007, it was noted that religious pluralism is enshrined by Malawi society, and members of Christian, Muslim, and Hindu faiths regularly engage in business and civil society together.

== Religious freedom ==
In 2023, the country was scored 4 out of 4 for religious freedom.

== See also ==
- Christianity in Malawi
- Catholic Church in Malawi
- Islam in Malawi
- Rastafari in Malawi
