= Makuta, Malawi =

Makuta
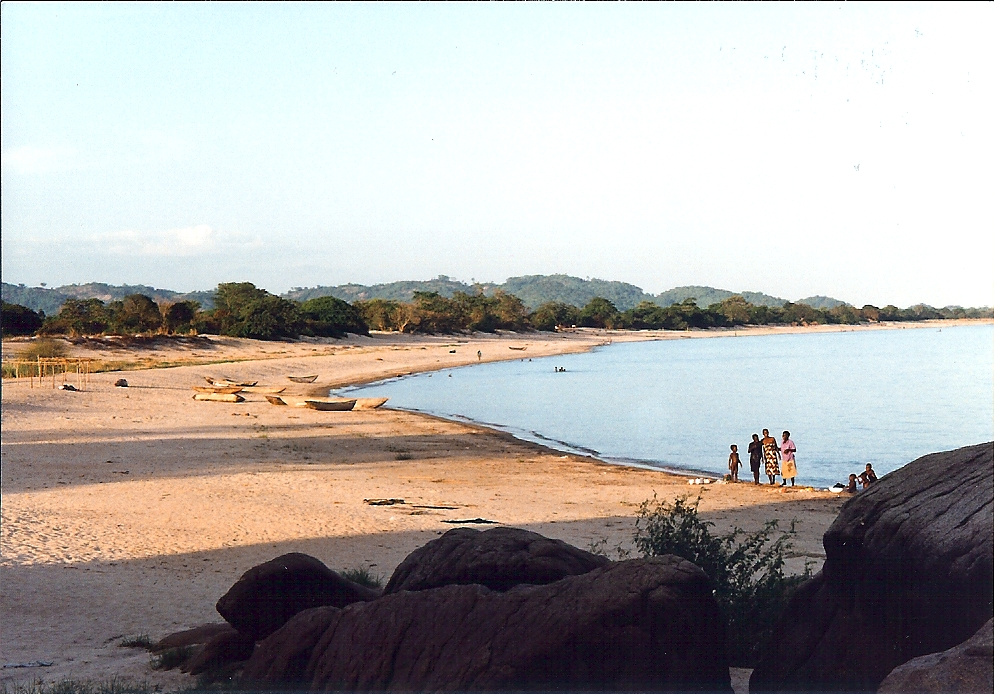
- Makuta, Malawi is located only 1 mile (1.6 km) north of Nkhotakota

- Location in Malawi
- Coordinates: 12°55′S 34°17′E
- Country: Malawi
- Region: Central Region
- District: Salima District

Makuta is a village in central Malawi on Lake Malawi. It is located in Salima District in the Central Region approximately 1.5 kilometres (1 mile) north of Nkhotakota.
