= Makanjira =

- village
- Interactive map of Makanjira
- Coordinates: 13.705°S 35.0257°E
- Country: Malawi
- Region: Southern
- District: Mangochi

Makanjira is a village on the shores of Lake Malawi in the Southern Region of Malawi. Plans have been in place since 2023 to improve the road to Makanjira. In 2026 a new hospital opened.

== Description ==
The village is in an area of historical importance which is registered with UNESCO.

SS Domira of the African Lakes Company

The southern end of Malawi came under Islamic influence from the 1880s. In 1891 the British Central African Protectorate was ratified. Makanjira was attacked by the British as "a chastisement". They hired the steamer Domira from the African Lakes Company to mount a 7-pounder gun.

In 2023 the then President Lazarus Chakwera announced that he had obtained $20m to fund a new 100 km road to link Mangochi and Makanjira. The road would link Malindi, Lungwena, Namalaka, Lugola, Bakili-Binali Litufu, Likoloma, Mauni, Mpiripiri, Lulanga and Fort Maguire when complete. Two years later, construction had not begun and the government agreed to another loan of $20m to extend the plans for the road. The local MP Victoria Kingstone and the Traditional Authority Makanjira welcomed the new loan, but questioned why the 2023 money had not been used to begin construction.

The Mangochi to Makanjira road scheme was summarised again in 2026. The money raised was sourced to OPEC, Saudi Arabia, Kuwait, the Arab Bank and Abu Dhabi and it exceeded $90m. A spokesman for the road authority Lawrent Kumbchenga said that a review was needed. Tanzanian consulting engineers were to look at the bridges. Work was scheduled for two years with a target date of July 2028.

The official opening of the Makanjira Emergency Obstetric and Newborn Care Hospital took place on 27 October 2026. The building had been supported by the Icelandic Embassy and it will serve the 150,000 people who live in the area.
