= 2008 census =

2008 census may refer to:

- 2008 census of Malawi
- 2008 North Korean census
