= Thomas John Bisika =

British demographer

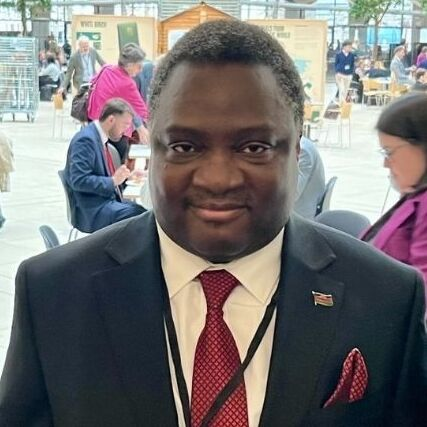
- Scotland Malawi Partnership photo in 2024
- Born: 1967 (age 58–59); Makanjira
- Occupations: academic and diplomat
- Known for: Malawi's High Commissioner to the UK

Thomas John Bisika (born 1967) is a social demographer and public health specialist, diplomat, and former health systems specialist at the World Health Organization in Nigeria. He became the Malawi High Commissioner to the United Kingdom in 2022.

== Life ==
Bisika was born on 6 April 1967 and he is from Makanjira Village, TA Chikowi, in the Zomba District of Malawi. He was the eighth of twelve children and like his elder brothers he studied at Chancellor College of the University of Malawi. While a student, Bisika formed the college's Demography Student Association and became its first President. He was the interim President of the Student Union of Chancellor College between 1992 and 1993.

Bisika has studied at Georgetown University in Washington, D.C., Johns Hopkins Bloomberg School of Public Health, University of Hawaiʻi, University of the Witwatersrand, Galilee College (Israel) and the University of South Africa. He holds a B.Sc. in Demography and Computer Science, an M.A. in Reproductive Health Demography and Statistics, a postgraduate certificate in Health Systems Management and Doctorate of Science in Medical Anthropology.

Bisika was the Chief of Division responsible for Health, HIV/AIDS, Nutrition, other related infectious diseases and Population at the African Union Commission in Addis Ababa, Ethiopia. He worked as a Programme Specialist for the United Nations Population Fund in the sub-regional office for Southern Africa in Johannesburg, South Africa as part of his career as a United Nations diplomat.

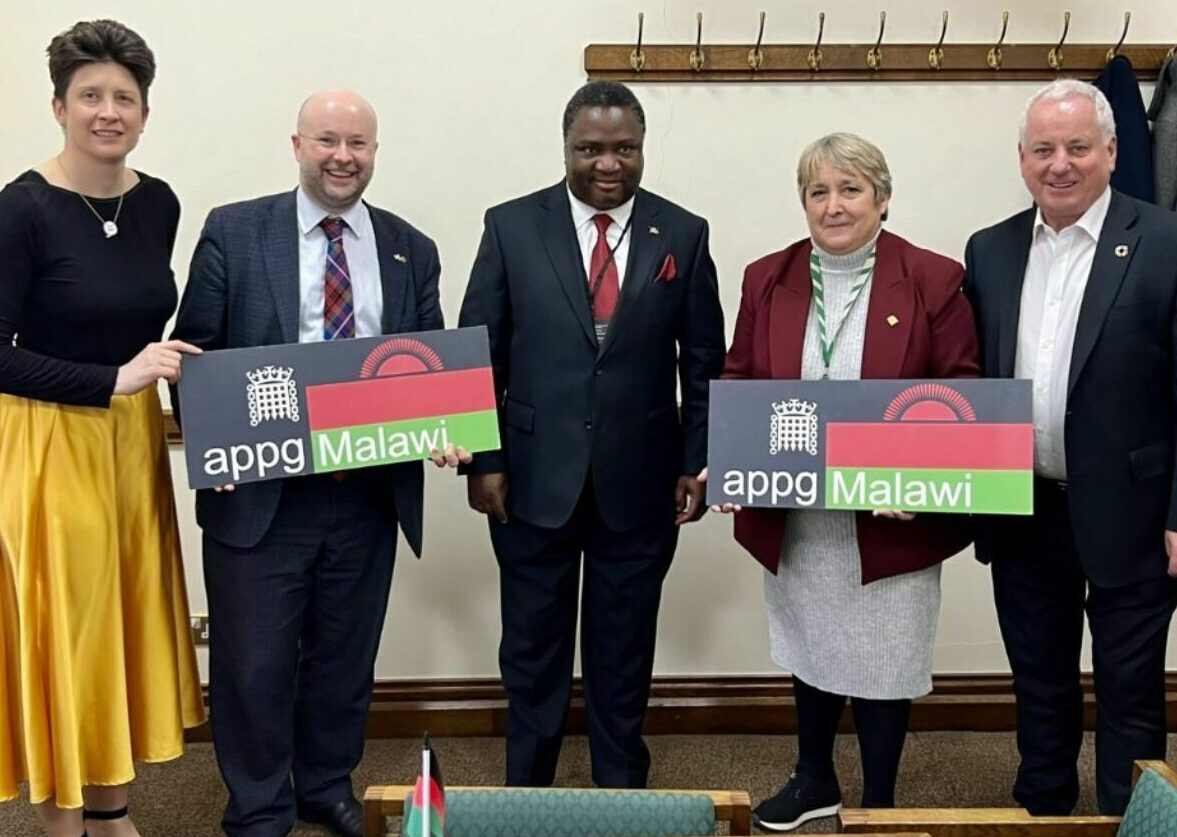
Scottish politicians and Bisika in 2023: Alison Thewliss, Patrick Grady, Thomas Bisika, Christine Jardine and Lord Jack McConnell.

Bisika was a Senior Lecturer in health policy and management at the University of Pretoria School of Health Systems. From 1993 to 2005 he was a Research Fellow at the Centre for Social Research of the University of Malawi. During this period he also taught demography and sociology at Chancellor College, a constituent College of the University of Malawi. He is a member of the Population Association of America.

In 2022 he presented his credentials to Queen Elizabeth II as Malawi's High Commissioner to the United Kingdom.

In 2025 he welcomed the launch of a Scotland Chapter of the UK-Malawi Chamber of Commerce. In June 2026 an office in Malawi was anticipated and the CEO spoke of moving from dialogue to delivery.

== Charity work ==
Bisika was a young member of the Lions Club International in Malawi. From 1994 to 2001, Bisika was the chairperson of the National Health Sciences Research Committee which is the National Health Research Ethics Review Board for the Malawi Government. It is located in the Ministry of Health headquarters. He approved a number of clinical trials and health related studies including some involving antiretroviral therapy. From 1998–2000 he was part of the Essential National Health Research network created under the auspices of the Council for Health Research and Development (COHRED). In 2008 Bisika was a member of the Positive Synergies between Global Health Initiatives and Health systems and a member of the Global Health Workforce Alliance (GHWA) and the Africa Platform on Human Resources for Health.

== Awards ==
In 1999 Bisika received The Gender Matters Award of the International Development Research Centre (IDRC) in Ottawa, Ontario. The money from this award was shared with the Centre for Social Research where he conducted the relevant research on traditional eye medicine.

At the African Union Bisika wrote speeches for H.E. Alpha Konare, Chairperson of the African Union Commission, and Advocate Bience Gawanas, Commissioner for Social Affairs. He was involved in a number of African Union policy documents including the African Common Position on Migration and Development, Africa Health Strategy, Plan of Action on Violence Prevention, Policy Framework on Sexual and Reproductive Health and Rights, Maputo Plan of Action and the Pharmaceutical Manufacturing Plan for Africa. He was a member of the drafting team for the Africa-EU Strategy that was adopted in Lisbon during the second EU-Africa Summit in December 2007. In 2006 he led a team that produced the second State of the African Population Report which was adopted by the African Population Commission in June 2006 in Johannesburg, South Africa.

Bisika was the director of the National AIDS Commission of Malawi. Dr Thomas Bisika has also previously worked as a consultant for the World Food Programme, World Health Organization, United Nations Population Fund, Danish Red Cross, Danish International Development Agency, Population Services International, International Eye Foundation, Catholic Relief Services, National AIDS Commission (Malawi), Ministry of Health, Ministry of Tourism, Ministry of Labour, Ministry of Home Affairs and Ministry of Gender of the Malawi Government and several NGOs including Project Hope, Banja La Mtsogolo and Emmanuel International.

== Publications include ==
- Bisika, Thomas; Ntata, Pierson; Konyani, Sidon (2009-09-01). "Gender-violence and education in Malawi: a study of violence against girls as an obstruction to universal primary school education". Journal of Gender Studies. 18 (3): 299–306. doi:10.1080/09589230903057183. ISSN 0958-9236.
- Bisika T, Konyani S, Chamangwana I, Khanyizira G. 2009. The Epidemiology of HIV among Drug Abusers in Malawi. African Journal of Drug and Alcohol Studies. 8(2): pages 126-131.
- Bisika, Thomas. 2008. Sexual and Reproductive Health and HIV/AIDS Risk Perception in the Tourism Industry: The Case of Malawi. Malawi Medical Journal; 21(2): pages 75–80.
- Bisika, T., Courtright, P., Geneua, R., Kasote, A., Chimombo, L and Chirambo, M. 2009. Self treatment for eye diseases in Malawi. African Journal of Traditional, Complementary and Alternative Medicines. 6(1): pages 23–29.
- Bisika, Thomas J. (2008). "Do social and cultural factors perpetuate gender based violence in Malawi?". Gender and Behaviour. 6 (2). doi:10.4314/gab.v6i2.23426. hdl:2263/10229. ISSN 1596-9231.
- Bisika, T and G. Mandere. 2008. Integration of Nutritional in the Antiretroviral Therapy Scale up Plan for Malawi. September 2008; Malawi Medical Journal. 20(3): pages 93–98.
- Bisika, Thomas. 2008. Cultural Factors that Affect Sexual and Reproductive Health in Malawi. Journal of Family Planning and Reproductive Health Care. 34 (2): pages 79–80, April 2008.
- Valerie A. Paz Soldan, Thomas Bisika, Aimee Benson, Janine Barden-Ofallon, Joseph deGraft-Johnson. 2007. Social, Economic and Demographic Determinants of Sexual Risk Behaviors among Men in Rural Malawi. African Journal of Reproductive Health. 11(2): pages 33–46. August 2007.
