= Mwanza District =

District of Malawi

Coordinates: 15°35′S 34°35′E

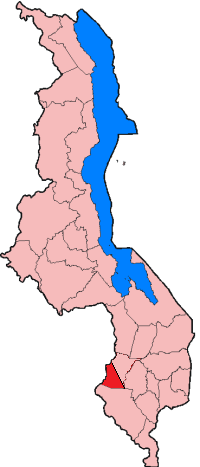
Location of Mwanza District in Malawi

Mwanza is a district in the Southern Region of Malawi. The capital is Mwanza. The district covers an area of 2,259 km² and has a population of 138,015.

Mwanza is a border town whose economy is based largely on transport. The agricultural economy for many years has depended upon citrus fruits (tangerine, lemon and grapefruit) as Mwanza is one of the few areas of the country where the climate is favourable for the growth of such crops. However, for over a decade production has been falling and the citrus industry has been in decline, despite efforts by the citrus growers association ZIPATSO.

Mwanza in 2003 was split into two districts, Neno and Mwanza, under the decentralisation program. Neno's population is 75,000.

== Demographics ==
At the time of the 2018 Census of Malawi, the distribution of the population of Mwanza District by ethnic group was as follows:

- 59.3% Chewa
- 30.4% Ngoni
- 4.2% Lomwe
- 2.3% Mang'anja
- 1.4% Yao
- 1.1% Sena
- 0.5% Tumbuka
- 0.1% Tonga
- 0.1% Nyanja
- 0.1% Nkhonde
- 0.0% Lambya
- 0.0% Sukwa
- 0.5% Others

== Government and administrative divisions ==
There are two National Assembly constituencies in Mwanza:

- Mwanza - Central
- Mwanza - West

Since the 2009 election both constituencies have been held by members of the Democratic Progressive Party.

== Notable people ==
- Keturah folk music singer-songwriter.
- Joyce Chitsulo (1978-2025), politician, MP for Mwanza West
- Maureen Chirwa, politician MP for Mwanza West from 2025
