= Namalaha =

- Village
- Location in Malawi
- Coordinates: 14°2′6″S 35°10′39″E
- Country: Malawi
- Region: Southern Region
- District: Mangochi

Area
  - Total: 2.13 km^{2} (0.82 sq mi)
- Elevation: 487 m (1,598 ft)
- Time zone: UTC+2 (CAT)

Namalaha (also known as Chiponda) is a village in Mangochi District, Southern Region, Malawi with a wet tropical savanna Köppen climate classification. The nearest airport to Namalaha is a small airport in Monkey Bay, 15 miles west crossing over Lake Malawi, and it is connected to the rest of the country by the 14-kilometer-long S129 road. Namalaha has ten other smaller roads within its area.
