= Ntchisi District Hospital =

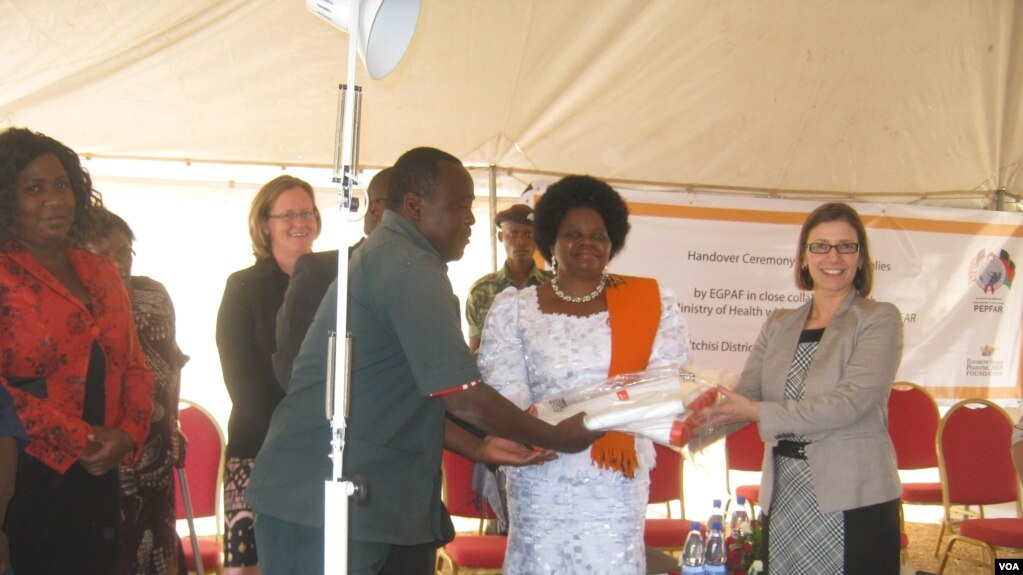
- Deputy Minister Mandebvu Agness Chatipwa receives a donation in 2013

Geography
- Location: Ntchisi District, Malawi
- Coordinates: 13.3636098°S 33.9076876°E

Organisation
- Care system: public

Ntchisi District Hospital is a district hospital in Ntchisi District in Central Malawi.

== Description ==
Ntchisi District Hospital is located in the town of Ntchisi on the T350 road to Mponela. The hospital is on the northern side of the Ntchisi Boma-T350 Road.

The hospital provides free healthcare to an estimated 352,000 people. In 2024, malaria was the most significant issue, with 7,792 cases recorded over a six-month-period. Diarrhea was the second most common condition, followed by respiratory diseases and influenza. The hospital has also contributed to reducing HIV/AIDS in the district, which was estimated at below 2%, down from a previous estimate of 3%.

== History ==
The hospital has an overworked maternity ward where some births are reportedly not recorded. There are said to be 16 neonatal deaths per 1,000 live births and 88 maternal deaths per 100,000 deliveries. In 2017, improvements the provision of mattresses for babies' cots. Staff receive training with support from Kamuzu Central Hospital and Queen Elizabeth Central Hospital.

In 2018, the National Bank of Malawi funded the installation of a borehole to provide the hospital with fresh water.

During the COVID-19 pandemic in Malawi, the hospital administered more vaccines than any other district hospital and was praised by the First Lady.

Water supply has remained an issue, including difficulties for staff in accessing water to wash their hands. In 2023, WaterAid Malawi awarded a contract to upgrade the hospital's water supply and handwashing facilities. The work was expected to help reduce cases of cholera.
