= Neno, Malawi =

Neno
- Location of Neno in Malawi
- Coordinates: 15°23′52″S 34°39′12″E
- Country: Malawi
- Region: Southern Region
- District: Neno District

Area
  - Total: 2.5 km^{2} (0.97 sq mi)

Population (2018)
  - Total: 2,283
  - Density: 910/km^{2} (2,400/sq mi)

Neno is a town in the Southern Region of Malawi. It is the administrative capital of Neno District.
