= Esther Mcheka Chilenje =

Malawian politician

Esther Mcheka Chilenje is a Malawian politician from the Democratic Progressive Party. She was MP for Nsanje North from 2014 to 2021. She had been defeated in an election to be the Speaker of the house. She became Malawi's Deputy Ambassador to the United Nations in 2022.

== Career ==
She was elected to Parliament in the 2014 general election and served as deputy speaker. On 19 June 2019, Catherine Gotani Hara was elected the first female Speaker of the National Assembly, with 97 votes to 93, over Mcheka Chilenje. Only a third of the 2019 assembly were re-elected MPs.

She was one of three women who took parliamentary seats in the Nsanje District which is the most southern region in Malawi. She took the Nsanje North constituency while Gladys Ganda won the Nsanje Lalanje constituency and Eurita Valeta became the MP for Nsanje South West. This was seen as an achievement, because of a nationwide target to achieve a 50:50 representation for women in parliament. This was achieved in Nsanje District, because there were five constituencies and 60% of them were represented by women.

Chilenje was one of the notable re-elections in 2019 together with Nancy Tembo, Rachel Zulu Mazombwe and Catherine Gotani Hara. Catherine Gotani Hara was a member of the MCP party and she stood against Chilenje for the position of Speaker in the National Assembly. The position had only ever been held by a man. Chilenje lost the election to Catherine Gotani Hara and Hara became the first woman speaker.

There was a court -ordered by-election in 2021 where Chileje was defeated. She later complained that she had been swindled by a fraudster.

Mcheka Chilenje served as Deputy Ambassador to the United Nations in 2022.
