= Gladys Ganda =

Malawian politician

- Education: University of Malawi et al
- Occupation: politician
- Employer(s): National Bank of Malawi, NOCMA
- Known for: member of parliament for Nsanje Lalanje

Gladys Ganda is a Malawian politician who was appointed as a Presidential advisor. She was a member of parliament for Nsanje Lalanje in Malawi and the Democratic Progressive Party. She was elected to chair parliament's Budget and Finance Committee in 2020. She lost her seat in the 2025 election.

== Life ==
Ganda attended the Chancellor College of the University of Malawi which is in Zomba and graduated with a BSc. She later went to Cape Town in South Africa to study for her MBA. She had a career inside the Bank of Malawi that lasted twenty years.

Ganda was an unsuccessful parliamentary candidate in 2017. She was the deputy CEO of NOCMA (the National Oil Company of Malawi.)

She stood again and in 2019 she became the member of parliament for the Nsanje Lalanje constituency. She was one of three women who took parliamentary seats in the Nsanje District which is the most southern region in Malawi. She took the Nsanje Lalanje constituency while Eurita Valeta won the South West constituency and Esther Mcheka Chilenje became the MP for Nsanje North. This was seen as a victory because of a nationwide target to achieve a 50:50 representation for women in parliament. This was achieved in Nsanje District because there were five constituencies and 60% of them were represented by women.

In 2020, Sosten Gwengwe resigned as chair of parliament's Budget and Finance Committee as that committee was intended to be led by a person whose party is not in government. Ganda was elected to the chair by the committee. She is only the second woman to lead this committee which is created by the constitution. The Budget and Finance Committee has a wide range of oversight into the nation's budgets, spending and government borrowing and it advices the respective ministry.

In August 2024 she became the DPP's elected Director of Elections. In September 2024 she had to be supported by her party after she apologised for comments she had made. She was demoted to be a Presidential adviser after an event in Sorjin where she praised the wrong person. She was fired after less than four weeks as the Director of Elections. Firing an elected politician raised some criticism. She made a full and public apology to the DPP, the President and the electorate.

She is a member the Malawi Parliamentary Women's Caucus which is an association of the women in parliament. In 2019 just 20% of the parliament were women. She lost her seat in the 2025 election to Karim Bilah Abdu who was an Independent.
