= Scotland Malawi Partnership =

Organization

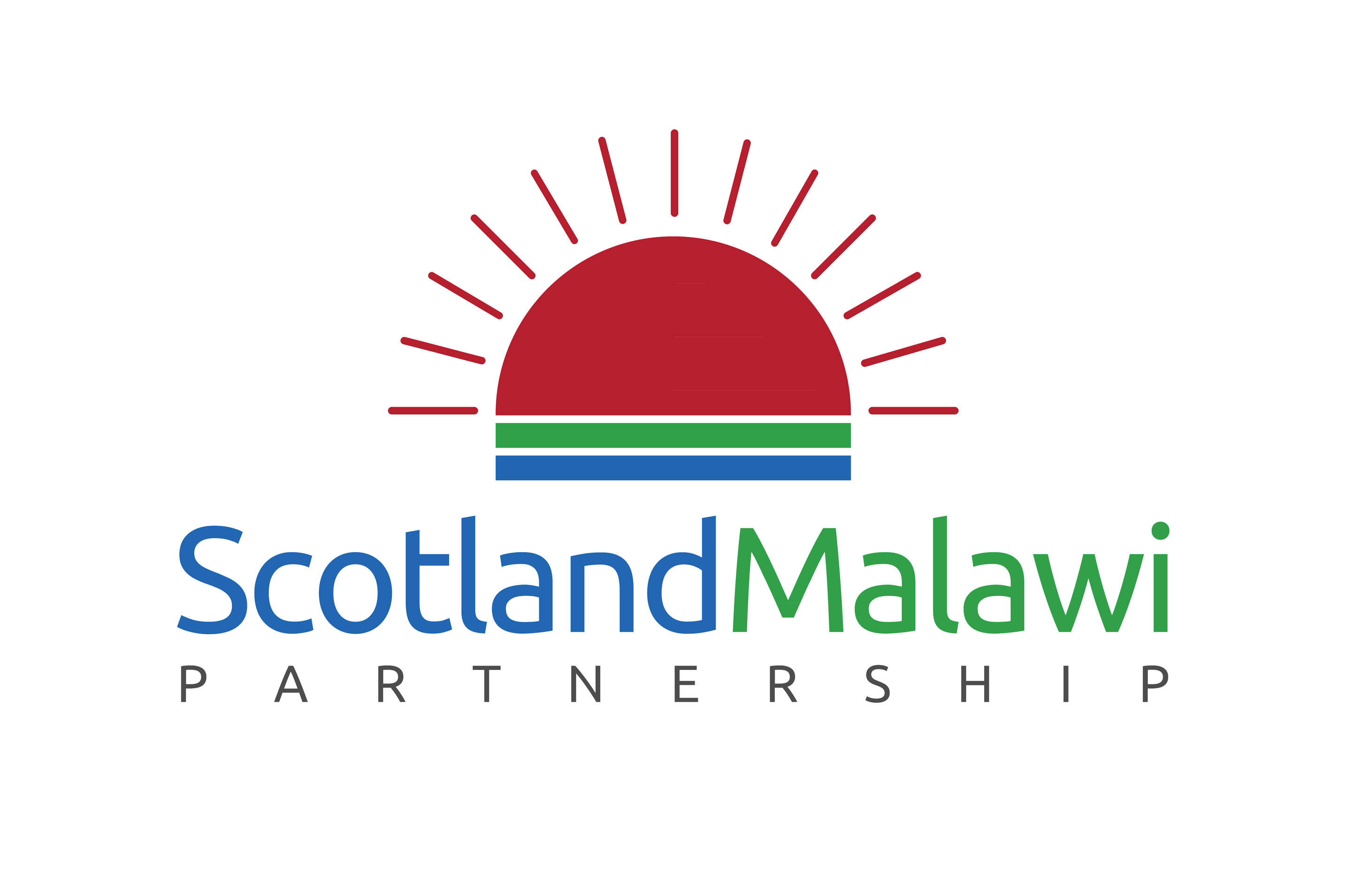
- Founded: 2004
- Type: Umbrella Organisation
- Purpose: a more effective Scottish involvement with Malawi
- Location: Edinburgh, Scotland
- Region served: Scotland, Malawi
- Method: Co-ordination of existing projects/links, investigation into and promotion of new projects, and advocacy on behalf of members
- Key people: Stuart Brown, Chief Executive (2023- )
- Employees: 6
- Website: www.scotland-malawipartnership.org

The Scotland Malawi Partnership (SMP) is a non-profit umbrella organisation which co-ordinates the activities of Scottish individuals and organisations with existing links to Malawi, and aims to foster further links between both countries. It is a charitable membership organisation, with over 1,100 members. It is independent of the Scottish Government and Scottish Parliament, although it works closely with both. It has a mirrored organisation in Malawi named the Malawi Scotland Partnership (MaSP).

== Vision ==
The partnership's vision in 2023 was "To inspire and support Scottish society to work in solidarity with the people of Malawi in an informed, co-ordinated, and equitable way – ever mindful of the legacy of colonial rule - for the benefit of both nations. "

== History ==
=== Scottish links with Malawi ===
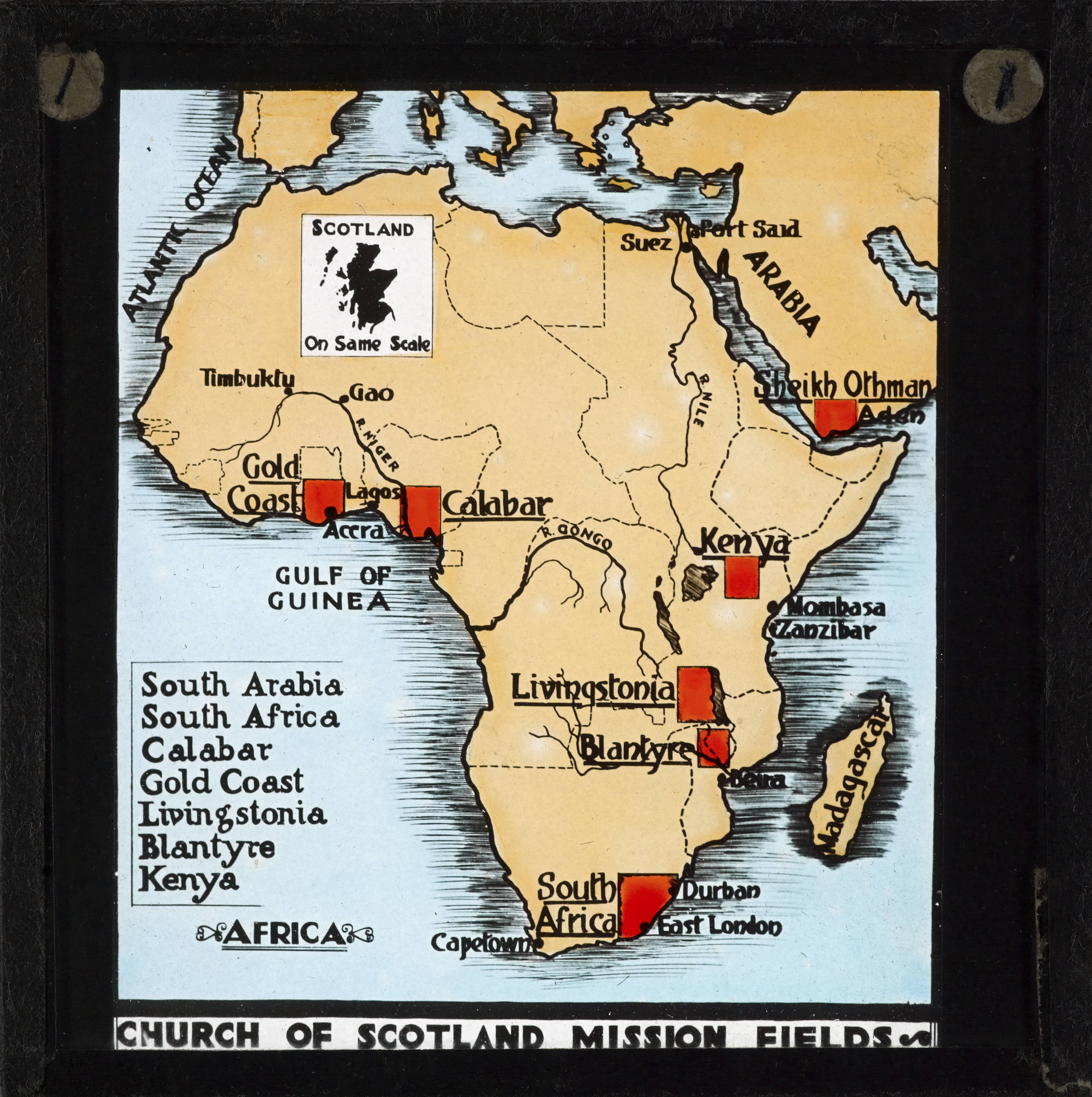
Map of Church of Scotland Mission Fields in the late 19th century

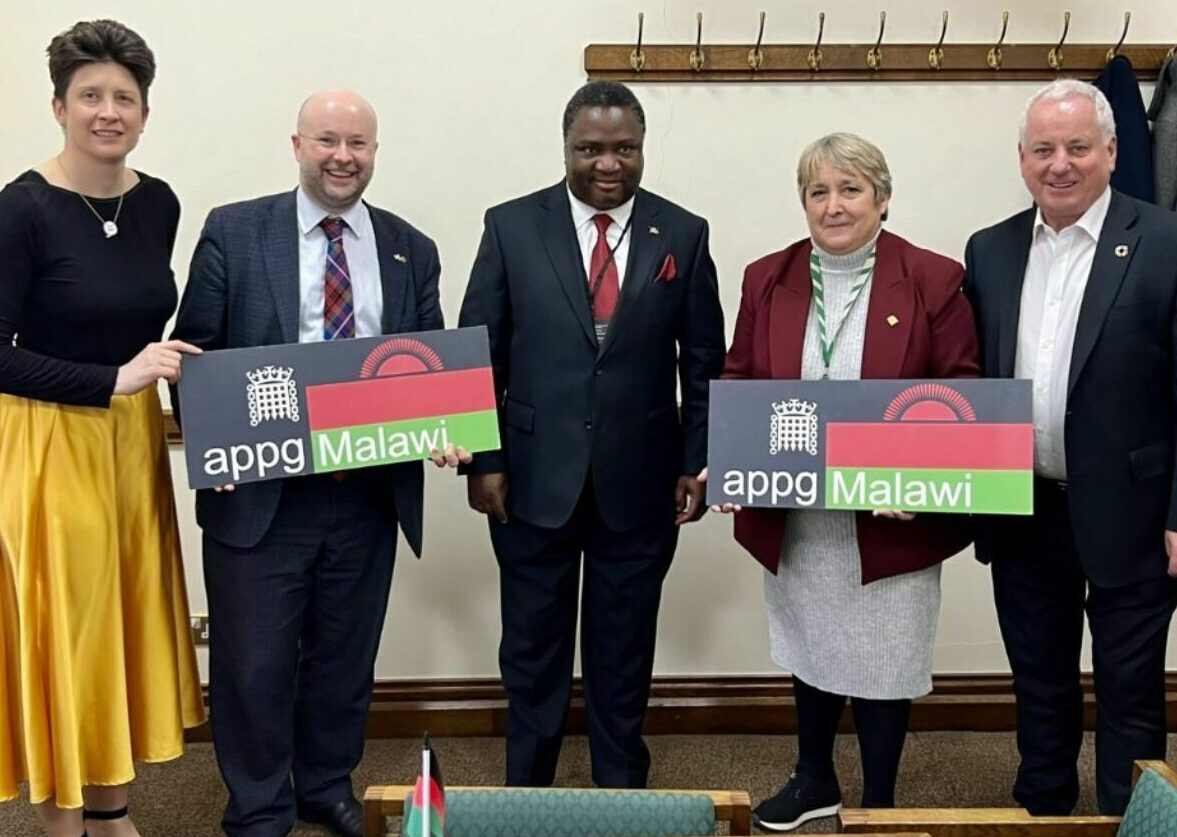
Scottish politicians and Malawi's High Commissioner in 2023: Alison Thewliss, Patrick Grady, High Commissioner Thomas John Bisika, Christine Jardine and Lord Jack McConnell.

Links between Scotland and Malawi began with David Livingstone's journeys up the Zambezi and Shire Rivers to Lake Malawi in 1859, long before the country of Malawi existed. Both the Church of Scotland and the Free Church of Scotland had established missions in Malawi by the mid-1870s. These missionaries persuaded the UK Government to declare the area a British Protectorate. This colonial arrangement lasted until independence was declared on 6 July 1964, with an independent Malawi becoming a member of the Commonwealth.

=== Origins ===
The Scotland Malawi Partnership developed from the 'Malawi Millennium Project' of the University of Strathclyde and Bell College, in response to the belief that there was a need to bring together under a single umbrella the many organisations and individuals throughout Scotland engaged in fostering and developing links between Scotland and Malawi.

The partnership was launched in the Glasgow City Chambers on 22 April 2004 by the Lord Provosts of Glasgow and Edinburgh, with the support of Ibrahim Milazi, the High Commissioner of Malawi, and representatives from the Universities of Glasgow and Strathclyde, the Church of Scotland, and the Scottish Catholic International Aid Fund (SCIAF). The Lord Provost of Glasgow and Dr. Peter West (Secretary of the University of Strathclyde) thereafter travelled to Malawi, and, with the support of Norman Ling, the (then) British High Commissioner, and numerous prominent Malawians, established the Malawi Committee of the Scotland Malawi Partnership which held its first meeting on 28 September 2004.

In 2005, the Scottish First Minister Jack McConnell's Head of Communications Susan Dalgety visited Malawi to organise the first official visit by the Scottish government.

=== Developments since formation ===
On 29 April 2005, the Scotland Malawi Partnership held a 'Shaping the Partnership' consultative conference at the University of Strathclyde, attended by approximately 100 people – representatives of NGOs, universities, small charities, hospitals and individuals with an interest in Malawi. Guests heard speeches from Ms Patricia Ferguson MSP, Minister for Tourism, Culture and Sport; The Lord Provost of Glasgow; Professor David Rubadiri, Vice Chancellor of the University of Malawi; Dr. Peter West and the Rev Howard Matiya Nkhoma, General Secretary of the Livingstonia Synod of the Church of Central Africa Presbyterian (CCAP). The proposed structure and remit of the partnership were decided upon.

The Interim Board had Rev Prof Ken Ross as the chair and Dr Peter West as the Vice Chair. The three founding members of the Scotland Malawi Partnership were the Malawi Millennium Project, Malawi Tomorrow and Child Survival in Malawi.

The partnership organised a Scottish Executive-funded 'Malawi Health Workshop' in 2005, attended by over 65 Scottish health professionals.

November of 2005 was a significant month for the Scotland Malawi Partnership. The partnership's conference, 'Malawi After Gleneagles: A Commission for Africa Case-Study', was held at the Scottish Parliament, involving over 250 delegates from Malawi and Scotland engaged in debates about international development. The First Minister, Jack McConnell MSP, and the late President of Malawi, Dr Bingu wa Mutharika, were keynote speakers. During Mutharika's visit, a Cooperation Agreement between Scotland and Malawi was signed.

Other important developments in November 2005 were the first applications for membership of the Scotland Malawi Partnership and confirmation of secure funding from the Scottish Executive (now Scottish Government) for two and a half years. The partnership became a legal entity on 12 December 2005 as a Scottish Charity (SC037048) and a Company Limited by Guarantee (SC294378). In the process, the partnership's Memorandum and Articles of Association were also ratified.

From May 2006 a full-time coordinator, Leo Williams, was appointed, working from the University of Strathclyde. Assisted by seed funding from the Interim Board, the Malawi Committee held its launch at the Capital Hotel in Lilongwe, attended by Patricia Ferguson (then Minister for Tourism, Culture and Sport) and a delegation from the Scottish Executive, as well as numerous prominent Malawians. The Scotland Malawi Partnership was registered as a Company Limited by Guarantee in Malawi (7852) on 4 May 2006.

In June 2006, the Lord Provosts of Edinburgh and Glasgow become Honorary Presidents of the Scotland Malawi Partnership. In collaboration with the Committee of Malawians in Scotland, the partnership staged a 'Malawi Independence Celebration' on 1 July to introduce the partnership to Malawians. Guests of honour included His Excellency Dr Francis Moto (Malawi High Commissioner to the UK), His Honour Colin Cameron (Malawi Honorary Consul to Scotland), Patricia Ferguson MSP and the Moyenda Band.

In August 2006, the Scotland Malawi Partnership relocated from an office in the University of Strathclyde to Edinburgh City Chambers.

With the election of the SNP in May 2007, the SNP launched a pledge which successfully persuaded the new administration to continue supporting Malawi – soon after, the devolved government announced that at least £3,000,000 per year from the International Development Fund would be reserved ("ring fenced") for Malawi projects.

== Activities and impacts ==
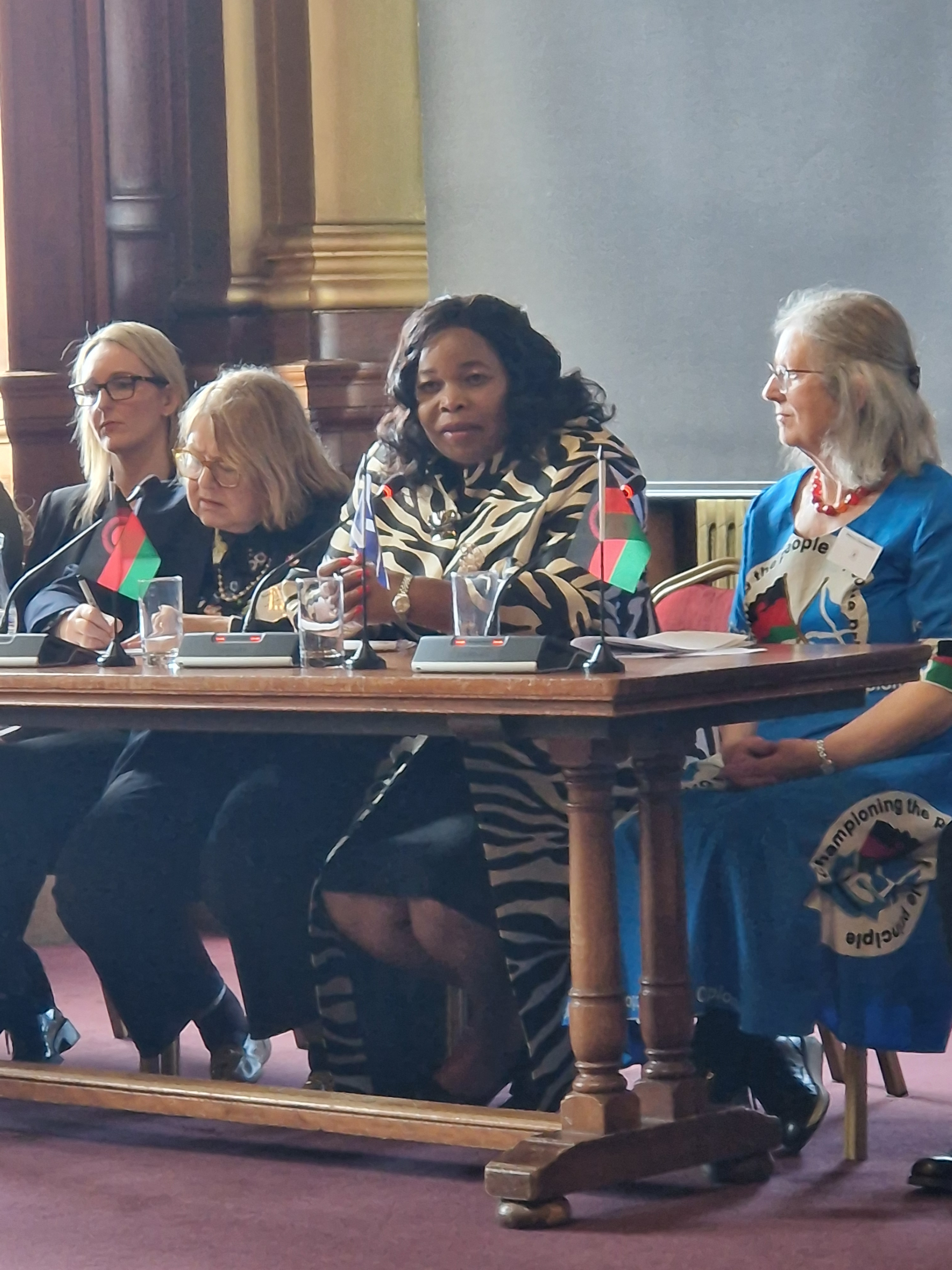
Minister of Gender Mary Navicha visiting the Scotland Malawi Partnership in March 2026. L to R: Tasha Boardman, Susan Dalgety, Navicha, Moira Dunworth.

Since its inception in 2004, the Scotland Malawi Partnership has staged organisational conferences in Edinburgh and Glasgow, bringing together representatives of Malawian and Scottish civil societies, governments, churches, educational institutions and NGOs, as well as workshops dealing specifically with issues relating to health and education. Malawi Independence Celebrations are held in Scotland annually around 6 July to commemorate Malawian independence from the United Kingdom in 1964.

The partnership circulates regular weekly news bulletins and monthly newsletters to members, detailing developments in the relationship between Scotland and Malawi, key news from Malawi, reports from members, partnership news, and upcoming events.

In 2007, the SMP hosted 3 stakeholder meetings focused on funding, health links and agriculture. These meetings were attended by 57 participants from 42 different organisations. Three workshops in relation to educational links and "best practice" were also held, attended by 150 individuals representing 43 different members of the partnership and 50 non members (schools, colleges and universities attending the Partnerships in Education Workshop). The partnership has also been involved in microfinance, governance, housing cooperatives and school partnerships.

By 2007, 58 projects had benefited from Scottish government funding, including Mary's Meals which feeds Malawian schoolchildren, and the Malawi Millennium Project which delivered equipment to schools for visually impaired children.

The partnership has also assisted in securing visas for those traveling between the two nations. An example was the St Patrick's Minor Seminary in Rumphi, which had a partnership with St Benedict's High School in Scotland. Three days before a planned visit in 2018 applicants were told that their applications for visas were rejected. The visas were granted after the partnership contacted members of parliament who raised it in parliament.

The SMP works closely with its sister organisation in Malawi which is called the Malawi Scotland Partnership (MaSP). In 2019 the MaSP's Chair was Anne Phoya. SMP also supported the launch of a Scotland Chapter of the UK-Malawi Chamber of Commerce, in collaboration with Malawi's High Commissioner, Thomas John Bisika; the Chapter held a scheduled first event in Edinburgh in June 2025.

In 2025 the partnership decided to change its image licensing to be Creative Commons cc-by-sa. This would allow its branding and images to be legally used by anyone so long as they are attributed.

In 2026 the UK government introduced large cuts to its funding. It was reported as a 90% cut and the SMP noted that "Some of the most vulnerable women, children and families in Malawi will suffer".

== Banana Boxes ==
Bananaboxes 2026 bound for Malawi

In 2026 the partnership took over the job of organising containers to take banana boxes loaded with goods to various charities in Malawi. The boxes are cached in Bathgate until a container can be filled and then it is shipped to be unpacked and distributed in Malawi. The phrase "banana box" is used because stout boxes are recommended.

=== Academic exchange ===
The partnership administers an Academic Exchange programme, which provides for the exchange of academic staff, administrators and librarians between the Universities of Scotland and Malawi. Over the period between 2007 and 2010, the project exchanged 24 'Fellows' – 12 Scottish, 12 Malawian. The first Scottish Fellow was David Bone who was attached to the Theology and Religious Studies Department at Chancellor College. Solomon Dindi was the first fellow from Malawi. He visited the University of Strathclyde's IT Services Department. He went on to manage improvements to Malawi's information infrastructure.

There are schools in Scotland that supports Malawi schools. Most Malawian religious schools are Catholic. St Peters Catholic school in Mzuzu, Malawi saw a group of students from the school visit St Michael's Academy, Kilwinning in Scotland on an education visit in March 2006. The group had a chance to visit the Scottish Parliament and talk with the then first Minister of Scotland, Jack McConnell. The school remains in partnership with Scotland through St Matthews Academy, after St Michael's Academy merged with St Andrews Academy. The students were each assigned to a Scottish family.

=== School Partnerships Working Group ===
In November 2006 the Scotland Malawi Partnership formed a School Partnership Working Group to coordinate requests from Scottish schools to create partnerships with Malawian schools. This working group brings together numerous organisations involved in school partnerships, including the Scottish Government, Scottish International Relief, UNICEF, Link Community Development, the League for the Exchange of Commonwealth Teachers, the British Council, ScotDec, the Church of Scotland, the International Development Education Association of Scotland (IDEAS), and representatives of schools with existing partnerships.

In 2007 it was reported that school links between Malawi and Scotland had increased from around ten schools to around 100. A large number of the Scottish schools involved in these partnerships are members of the SMP.

== Organisational structure and members ==
=== The Board ===
The partnership has a board of directors, a chair, three co-vice chairs; and approximately a dozen members. In January 2025 the Partnership appointed Professor Jeremy Bagg to succeed Professor Heather Cubie as the chair. The partnership board also agreed the three voluntary vice chairs. The senior vice-chair was Susan Dalgety.

=== CEO ===
Stuart Brown became the CEO in January 2023 taking over from David Hope-Jones OBE who became one of the youngest recipients of an OBE in 2016 while CEO. In 2023, his resignation—after nearly fifteen years with the partnership—was noted in the Scottish parliament.

=== Committees ===
The partnership has three committees to manage organisation and functioning: Audit and Finance Committee; Policy and Strategy Committee; and Staffing Committee.

=== Forums ===
In order to give members the opportunity to exchange information on a subject specific basis, the partnership developed five forums:

- Higher and Further Education Forum
- Primary and Secondary School Forum
- WASH Forum
- Renewables Forum
- Business, Investment, Trade and Tourism Forum
- Governance Forum
- Health Links Forum

The different forums host meetings throughout the year in order to discuss relevant issues in Malawi and exchange advice and expertise on each topic. Members are welcome to join any forum. The partnership also actively encourages anyone with links or interests in Malawi to attend the forums to share or develop their knowledge and views.

=== Youth Members ===
The partnership has also launched a youth membership category at the Scottish Parliament in 2012. The event was attended by over 200 guests including Minister for External Affairs and International Development, Humza Yousaf MSP, and Maureen Watt MSP. It was a networking event; aimed at enabling schools, young people aged 16–24, charities, and organisations with interests in Malawi to share their knowledge. The youth membership grew by nearly 100 new members.

=== Patron ===
Princess Anne is Honorary Patron of the SMP, as is the Malawian President, H.E. Professor Arthur Peter Mutharika.
