= Francesca Masamba =

Malawian politician (born 1982)

- Born: 14 December 1982 (age 43)
- Education: University of Malawi
- Occupation: politician
- Known for: representing Mangochi East
- Political party: Democratic Progressive Party (DPP)

Francesca Theula Masamba (born 14 December 1982) is a Malawian politician who has represented the Mangochi East constituency since 2019. She is a member of the Democratic Progressive Party (DPP).

== Early life and education ==
Masamba was born in 1982. She studied business management at University of Malawi.

== Career ==
Masamba became the Democratic Progressive Party (DPP) member for the Mangothi East constituency in 2019. Victoria Kingstone who was also in the DPP was the Mangothi central MP. Historically the whole of the Mangochi District was represented by members of the Democratic Progressive Party but this did not continue however. For example, in 2024 the Mangochi - Nkungulu constituency had a UDF membered MP Aisha Adams and the UDF's Lilian Patel was the MP for Mangothi East.

In 2020 she was arrested following allegations from a candidate to lead the Directorate of Public Officers Declarations. The Anti-Corruption Bureau (ACB) had been told that Masamba allegedly demanded a large payment in exchange for supporting the candidates application. Masamba was a member of the Public Appointments Committee which was led by Mwanza West MP Joyce Chitsulo. Chitsulo had taken the allegation to the ACB.

In August 2024 the Democratic Progressive Party announced its new national executive. Sameer Suleman was the National Organizing Secretary General and the Deputy Organizing Secretary was Francesca Masamba. In October the commonwealth heads of government were meeting in Samoa. A group of concerned parliamentarians were concerned at the rate of progress in controlling modern slavery and in achieving gender equality. The open letter was signed by 20 politicians in thirteen countries.
