= Roseby Dinala =

Malawian politician (1937–2020)

- Born: 8 August 1937; Chiradzulu District
- Died: 11 August 2020; Blantyre
- Other name: Mai Dinala
- Occupation: politician
- Known for: MCP National executive member
- Political party: Malawi Congress Party

Roseby Dinala or Mai Dinala (8 August 1937 – 11 August 2020) was a Malawian politician and a Malawi Congress Party National executive member.

== Life ==
Dinala was born in 1937 in Mbulumbuzi,Chiradzulu in Chiradzulu District.

In 1958 she was at Chileka Airport to welcome back Hastings Banda who became Malawi's first President. She became an enthusiastic supporter of the Malawi Congress Party. Her uncle, Lali Lubani, was one of the country's first ministers. Dinala led the party's supporters in Blantyre from that time and till her death. She did not always agree with the party, but she remained loyal.

Hastings Banda died and the MCP lost power in 1994. The party were in opposition for over 25 years until 2020, when President Chakwera was elected. Dinala's loyalty was fulfilled and she was one of Chakwera's advisors.

In 2017, she celebrated her 80th birthday and her party was organised by the MCP and it was attended by Abida Mia who was a government minister. Mia noted how Dinala had been a National Executive member and how she led the organisation in Blantyre.

Dinala died in Blantyre in 2020. The President and his wife both attended the funeral service although only 50 mourners were allowed in the church because of COVID-19 restrictions. Another important mourner was Cecilia Kadzamira who was once the most powerful woman in the country. She was Hastings Banda's First Lady. President Chakwera read the eulogy to a "pillar of the MCP". After the service the President left and the COVID-19 precautions were said to be much less. Dinala was buried in the Chitawera cemetery.

== Private life ==
She had fourteen children.
