= Ntchisi =

- Location in Malawi
- Coordinates: 13°22′S 34°0′E
- Country: Malawi
- Region: Central Region
- District: Ntchisi District

Population (2018 Census)
  - Total: 9,357
- Time zone: +2

Ntchisi is a town located in the Central Region of Malawi. It is the administrative capital of Ntchisi District.

== Demographics ==
| Year | Population |
|---|---|
| 1987 | 3,073 |
| 1998 | 5,773 |
| 2008 | 7,918 |
| 2018 | 9,357 |

== Healthcare ==
Ntchisi is served by a District hospital located at the capital and several health centres in its peripherals. The majority of the health facilities are government run. However, there are other facilities run by missions or churches like in the case of Mpherere, Chinthembwe and malambo health centres. The government run health centres include Malomo rural hospital, Kansonga, Mkhuzi, Nthondo, Mzandu and Kangolwa health centres. Chafumbwa health centre is still under construction.

== Education ==
Ntchisi has several education institutions ranging from nursery, primary, secondary and tertiary. It has two full boarding secondary schools, Mbomba and Ntchisi (formerly Ntchisi Boys). Community secondary schools include: Malomo, Kanjiwa, Gwangwa, Mphere, Chinthembwe, Mawiri, Kayoyo, Kasakula, and Chipala Community Day Secondary School, and the newly opened Ntchisi Private Secondary School located near Ng'ombe Trading Centre. There are also several private tertiary institutions that technical and academic levels.

== Agriculture ==
The major part of the population in Ntchisi live on subsistence agriculture. The most popular crops are Tobacco, Maize, Soya, Groundnuts, Cassava, Peas, Beans and Sorghum.

== Transport ==
Ntchisi has one of the worst road networks, with only one tarmac road from Mponela to the capital commonly known as Ntchisi boma. The rest of the road are dry weather roads. The population is served by privately owned minibuses and some pick-ups that travel to the most remote areas. However, there is a national bus company which operates routine between the capital city Lilongwe and Ntchisi boma. Airports: There is only one unpaved airport in Ntchisi.

== Tourism ==
One of the tourist attraction is 1702-meter Ntchisi Mountain and its surrounding forest reserve which is one of the biggest forest reserves in Malawi. There are several lodging sites in Ntchisi including Ntchisi Lodge.
