= Eurita Valeta =

Malawian politician

Eurita Ntiza Valeta
- Occupation: Politician
- Title: Member of Parliament (MP), Deputy Chairperson of the Parliamentary Committee on Health
- Term: 2019
- Political party: independent

Eurita Ntiza Valeta is a Malawian politician who represented the Nsanje South West constituency from 2019.

== Career ==
In 2019 Valeta was one of three women who took parliamentary seats in the Nsanje District which is the most southern region in Malawi. Valeta won the South West Nsanje constituency with nearly 13,000 votes, which was twice that of the second candidate. Meanwhile, Gladys Ganda won the Nsanje Lalanje constituency, and Esther Mcheka Chilenje became the MP for Nsanje North. This was seen as a victory because of a nationwide target to achieve a 50:50 representation for women in parliament. This was achieved in the Nsanje District because there were five constituencies, and 60% of them were represented by women.

After the election, the losing Democratic Progressive Party candidate, Helen Buluma, said that she had been assaulted at a polling station after she saw Valeta's sister placing votes for other people. Buluma said that her supporters had thought that she had taken pictures of the malpractice. The Malawi Electoral Support Network was reported to have asked the police to investigate. Bulema took her case to the high court, asking for a re-run that excluded Valeta. The court ruled that Bulema had failed to provide sufficient evidence.

In 2021 Valeta contacted the Ministry of Education regarding the poor state of Nsanje Secondary School. The school required repairs to windows and floors. Hostels lacked electricity and the headteacher said that the toilet and washing facilities were affected because they could not afford to pay the water company.

In 2024, she was Deputy Chairperson of the Parliamentary Committee on Health and she made headlines when she was talking about teenage pregnancies. Some of these arrive from richer older men paying poor young girls to have sex. These men are known as "blessers" and she had suggested that a successful campaign needed to educate men about the harm that they were causing.

Valeta stood again for the same constituency taking on seven opponents who were this time all men in the 2025 election. She was facing name calling and she had been warned off using one location. However she acknowledged the help she was getting from organisations supporting women candidates including from Oxfam's Lingalireni Mihowa. She remembered having to fund items in the 2019 election herself and they were now covered.
