= Fyness Magonjwa =

Malawian politician (born 1997)

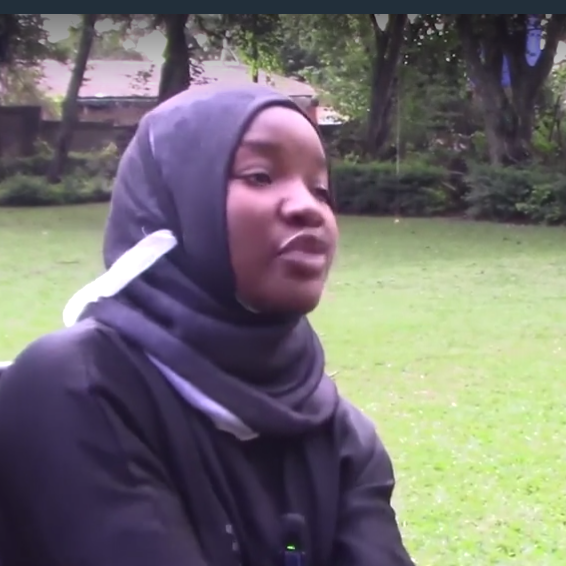
- Born: 26 June 1997 (age 29); Machinga
- Occupation: politician
- Known for: Youngest member of parliament
- Political party: Democratic Progressive Party

Fyness Magonjwa or Fyness Mwagonjwa (born 26 June 1997) is a Malawian politician who was the youngest member of parliament in 2019. She represented the Machinga South East constituency, and she is a member of the ruling Democratic Progressive Party.

== Life ==
Magonjwa was born in 1997 in Machinga and she was the first of four children. She attended the local primary and secondary schools. She was elected by the Machinga South East constituency, as a member of the ruling Democratic Progressive Party. She was the winner out of eight candidates taking over 8,000 of the 30,000 plus votes. She had overcome the difficulties that face young prospective members of parliament. Even though the average age of voters is low the financial and institutional barriers to new entrants is high.

In 2019 she was teased in the press for errors in her use of English, though this was seen as a more widespread failing by more members of parliament. She had given an interview that went viral because of her use of English. Fluency in spoken and written English is an essential requirement of parliamentarians. It has been proposed that Chichewe should be allowed in debates, but the laws are written in English and members need to understand them.

She was criticised in 2020 for mixing tribal associations with politics during a speech in her constituency. She was accused of racial bigotry after she advised that chiefs should not take part in any rallies organised by the opposition party.

In 2024, she was still the youngest member of parliament as she campaigned to encourage more young people to get involved in politics.

In 2025, she was advised by the first deputy speaker, Madalitso Kazomb, to not lower herself to the behaviour of other parliamentarians. However she was again teased about her use of English. She completed her five year term and she stood for election again in 2025. She advised others to make sure that when elected they did not settle for minor roles in parliament.
