= Maureen Namwali =

Malawian politician (born 1975)

- Born: 8 March 1975 (age 51); Thyolo District
- Occupation: politician
- Political party: Democratic Progressive Party
- Website: MP home site

Maureen Namwali (born March 8, 1975) became a Malawian member of parliament in 2025.

== Life ==
Namwali was born in Thyolo District in 1975. She joined the Democratic Progressive Party and won the primaries in her home constituency of Thyolo Goliati in the 2025 General Election. She succeeded, despite some making it difficult for women candidates, although they received the support of Oxfam's Lingalireni Mihowa and the NGO Gender Coordination Network's Maggie Kathewera Banda.

In parliament, Namwali was made vice chair of the parliamentary committee concerned with Social and Community Affairs. That committee is chaired by Savel Kafwafwa.
