= Keturah (musician) =

- Origin: Mwanza District, Malawi
- Genre: Folk
- Occupations: Singer, song-writer
- Instrument: Vocals
- Label: Hen House

Keturah is a Malawian singer-songwriter who sings in Chichewa. Her debut album, Keturah, was released in 2023.

== Early life ==
Keturah grew up in a village in Mwanza District, in Southern Malawi, and learned music as a child by performing traditional songs in Chichewa with her uncle, a guitarist. In a 2023 interview she said that at the age of 11 she walked about 92 kilometeres to Blantyre to record, and that a studio there recorded her songs without charge.

== Career ==
World Music Central describes her as a folk singer. Her early recordings were played on Malawian radio, and she became known by the nickname "local girl". Through Luc Deschamps of the Jacaranda Foundation, she was introduced to Harlan Steinberger of Hen House Studios, and in July 2022 she travelled to Venice, California to record there. The resulting ten-track album "Keturah" was released in 2023.

The Nation review of the album noted influences from South African mbaqanga and Malawian folk music, but described "Nchiwewe (Ode to Willie Neslon)" as one of the albums "strangest entries", saying it sounded more Hawaiian than country.

Keturah was listed as one of the performers for the 2025 Lake of Stars Festival. In 2026 Keturah was announced as a performer at the Roots of Malawi Culture Festival, organised by the rapper Tay Grin and scheduled for 17 October 2026 in Lilongwe.

== Discography ==
Keturah (Hen House, 2023)
