= Victoria Kingstone (politician) =

Malawian politician

- Occupation: politician
- Known for: MP for central Mangochi
- Political party: Democratic Progressive Party

Victoria Kingstone is a Malawian politician who served as a Member of Parliament for Mangochi Central Constituency in 2019. In 2021, she also became a member of the Pan-African Parliament and later Vice President of the Pan-African Parliament Women's Caucus. She was re-elected for Mangochi in 2022. In 2025, she was accused of plotting to kill the woman who beat her in that year's election.

== Life ==
Kingstone was a member of the Democratic Progressive Party and a strong supporter of President Arthur Peter Mutharika. In 2019 she was the elected MP for the constituency of Mangothi Central and Francesca Masamba became the Democratic Progressive Party (DPP) member for the Mangothi East constituency. There was sume question over the primaries vote but Kingstone was chosen over Vincent Makda and the Minister of Labour, Grace Chiumia, accepted that there was due process. Historically the whole of the Mangochi District was represented by members of the Democratic Progressive Party but this did not continue.

Kingstone noted in 2019 that Mangothi now had faster access by road to nearby towns, the Mangothi stadium and passports and driving licences could now be obtained in the town. She believed that Mangothi would soon have a hotel, a golf course and airport that would convert it into a centre for tourism. By 2020 the COVID-19 pandemic had broken out and by October 2020 schoolchildren were being allowed to return to school as long as they wore facemasks. A new story identified the case of a girl who had made a facemask out of a milk carton so that she could go to school. Kingstone reacted to the story by arranging for her school to be supplied with facemasks and Kingstone said that she had adopted that girl and she would be supporting her education.

Kingstone was again elected for Mangothi Central in 2022. She was already the Democratic Progressive Party's Deputy Director for women when she obtained 2,226 votes and her closest rival, Victor Makda, had 1,700 votes. The voting had been delayed for an hour at one of the two voting locations due to a disagreement. However Minister Grace Chiumia, who had overseen the election. was happy to endorse the result.

In 2020 the proposed plans for Mangochi Airport were delayed and 100s of local landowners were expecting compensation. As the local MP, Kingston spoke up in parliament urging action and for President Lazuras Chakwera to not abandon the plans for the airport and hotel.

Kimgstone became a member of the Malawi Parliamentary Women's Caucus. In 2021 she was the only woman in a party of five parliamentarians from Malawi who visited the Pan-African Parliament in Johannesburg. The parliament is a creation of the African Union and Kingstone became a member of it. She was to represent the 16 member states of the Southern African Development Community.

In February 2023 Naomi Kilekwa was suspended from parliament by the speaker Catherine Gotani Hara after unruly behaviour during President Lazarus Chakwera's state of the union address. She had refused to leave the room and Mary Navicha, Thoko Tembo and Kingstone supported her. Kingstone and the other two supporters were suspended as well. She became the Vice President of the Pan-African Parliament Women's Caucus and in May 2023 she made a presentation to the Pan-African Parliament on the caucus's behalf which summarised their work since November 2022. She proposed an increased role by the caucus and a fact-finding mission to Sudan to investigated gender-based violence in the hostilities there. The proposals were agreed by the parliament.

In 2025 the government agreed to a loan of $20m to extend the plans for a new road to Makanjira. Kingstone and Traditional Authority Makanjira welcomed the new loan but questioned why the initial money which was agreed in 2023 had not been used to begin construction.

== Controversies and legal challenges ==
In April 2024 she was in the media as she was planning to marry a man and another woman said that she was married to him.

In the September 2025 general election, Kingstone lost her Mangochi Central parliamentary seat to Roza Fatch Mbilizi. The following month, she was arrested with two associates over allegations of plotting to murder Mbilizi. Police said the alleged plan aimed to retaliate for the election loss. Kingstone denied any wrongdoing and was later released on bail by the Mangochi Magistrate Court as investigations continued.
