= Masanjala =

Masanjala is a rural province in the southern region of Malawi, in the southern part of Africa. Masanjala is located 70 kilometers south of the commercial city of Blantyre. With a population of about 10,000 people, its main source of income is agriculture. The town center has a nursery school, primary school, two secondary schools (government and private) and a Catholic Parish. It is located in the district of Chiradzulu.
