= 2008 census of Malawi =

Fifth census of Malawi
← 1998	July 8-28, 2008	2018 →

General information
- Country: Malawi

Results
- Total population: 13,077,160 (▲31.64%)
- Most populous region: Southern (5,858,035)
- Least populous region: Northern (1,708,930)

The 2008 Malawi census was the fifth national census in Malawi, which took place on 8-28 July 2008. The population of Malawi was counted as 13,077,160 – an increase of 3,143,292 (31.64%) over the 1998 census.

Preliminary results from the 2008 census were released to the public in November 2008 and final results in November 2009, from the National Statistical Office of Malawi website. The next Malawian census was held on 3-23 September 2018.

== Projections ==
The 2008 projected population of Malawi was 13,630,164 based on the medium variant of projections based on the 1998 census. The actual enumerated population was 13,077,160 which was about 96% the size of the 2008 projection.

== Results ==
=== Population and dwellings ===
Population counts for regions of Malawi. All figures are for the census de facto population count. The de jure results showed a population of 13,029,498.

Region	Population	%
Southern	5,858,035	44.8
Central	5,510,195	42.14
Northern	1,708,930	13.07
Malawi	13,077,160	100

- Resident population count was 13,077,160 up 3,143,292 from the 1998 census.
  - There are 6,358,933 males in Malawi (48.63% of the population) and 6,718,227 females (51.37% of the population).
- On average, the population grew by around 2.8% per year since the 1998 census – significantly higher than the annual average growth between 1987 and 1998, which was 2.0%.

=== Birthplace ===
In 2008, 13,025,606 people (99.61%) were born in Malawi, with 51,554 (0.39%) born abroad.

Birthplace	Responses	
Birthplace	Number	% pp
Malawi	13,025,606	99.61
Abroad	51,554	0.39
Mozambique	19,020	0.15
Zambia	5,772	0.04
Zimbabwe	4,442	0.03
Burundi	2,943	0.02
Rwanda	2,820	0.02
Tanzania	2,487	0.02
India	2,388	0.02
United Kingdom	1,604	0.01
Congo	1,506	0.01
South Africa	1,439	0.01
Other	7,133	0.05
Total	13,077,160	100

=== Religion ===
According to the 2008 census, 82.7% of the population identified as being Christian, 13% as Muslim, 2.5% identified as having no religion, and 1.9% had other religions.

Religious affiliation	Population	%
Christian	10,770,229	82.66
Muslim	1,690,087	12.97
Irreligion	326,679	2.51
Other	242,503	1.86
Total	13,029,498	100
