= Ntchisi Mountain =

Mountain in Malawi

- Location within Malawi

Highest point
- Elevation: 1,702 m (5,584 ft)
- Coordinates: 13.360224°S 34.014077°E

Geography
- Location: Malawi

Ntchisi Mountain is a mountain in central Malawi. It is located in Ntchisi District, east of the town of Ntchisi.

Ntchisi Mountain's peak reaches 1702 meters elevation. A few neighboring peaks exceed 1600 meters. Ntchisi lies on the western edge of the East African Rift, and Ntchisi is part of a north-south belt of hills, mountains, and escarpments that form the western boundary of the rift. To the east is a plain that borders on Lake Malawi. To the west is the Central Region Plateau, also known as the Lilongwe Plain.

Ntchisi Mountain Forest Reserve was established in 1924, and covers an area of 97.12 km^{2}. The mountain is home to an enclave of montane rain forest, the only montane rainforest between Chipata Mountain to the north and Dedza Mountain and the Kirk Range further south. The rainforest covers about 220 hectares, between 1,450 and 1,640 meters elevation. The dominant canopy tree is Aningeria sp., with a smaller area (30ha) of tall Newtonia buchananii rainforest on the southeastern slope. Strangler figs (Ficus spp.) are abundant. Montane grasslands and shrublands are also found at higher elevations. Miombo woodland predominates on the lower slopes.

Ntchisi Mountain is the southern limit of the range for the songbird Sharpe's greenbul (Phyllastrephus alfredi), and two species of butterfly, Charaxes ameliae and Hypolycaena hatita.

Ntchisi Forest Lodge is a visitor-serving eco-lodge in the forest reserve, located on the south slope of the mountain.
