= Mangochi Airport =

- IATA: MAI; ICAO: FWMG

Summary
- Airport type: Defunct
- Serves: Mangochi
- Elevation AMSL: 1,580 ft / 482 m
- Coordinates: 14°29′20″S 35°15′45″E

Map
- Location of the airport in Malawi

Runways
Direction	Length		Surface
Direction	m	ft	Surface
03/21	690	2,264	Grass
- Sources: GCM Google Maps

Mangochi Airport (IATA: MAI, ICAO: FWMG) was an airport that used to serve the town of Mangochi in Southern Region, Malawi.

== History ==
In 2014, plans to construct and replace the old Mangochi Airport were conceived with the purpose of boosting tourist accessibility to Malawi. It was expected to be built under Public Private Partnership arrangement, with an estimated cost of US $250 million. It was proposed to have a 2.5 km long runway, terminal building for passengers and cargo facilitation amenities.

In 2020 the plans for the airport were delayed and 100s of local landowners were expecting compensation. The local MP Victoria Kingston spoke up in parliament urging action and for the President Lazuras Chakwera not to abandon the plan for the airport and hotel.

== See also ==
- List of airports in Malawi
- Transport in Malawi
