= Mwaulambya =

Ruling title of Lambya people in Malawi

Mwaulambya is a title given to the ruler of Lambya people in present Malawi. The Bulambya kingdom dates back to 1600s. The current Mwaulambya was elevated on 4 September 2022 to the position of Senior Chief.
