= Machinga, Malawi =

Machinga
- Location of Machinga in Malawi
- Coordinates: 15°10′45″S 35°18′0″E
- Country: Malawi
- Region: Southern Region
- District: Machinga District

Area
  - Total: 2.4 km^{2} (0.93 sq mi)

Population (2018)
  - Total: 1,833
  - Density: 760/km^{2} (2,000/sq mi)

Machinga is a town in the Southern Region of Malawi, a landlocked country in Southeastern Africa. It is the administrative capital of Machinga District.
