= Makuta, Botswana =

Village in Botswana

Coordinates: 20°40′40″S 27°7′10″E

Location of Makuta

Makuta is a village in Central District of Botswana. It is located 70 km north-west of Francistown, along the road connecting Francistown to Tutume. The population was 1,295 in 2001 census.
