= Joyce Chitsulo =

Malawian politician (1978–2025)

- Born: 27 May 1978
- Died: 6 June 2025 (aged 47); Lilongwe, Malawi
- Occupation: Politician
- Known for: Chairing the Public Appointments Committee
- Political party: Democratic Progressive Party

Joyce Chitsulo (27 May 1978 – 6 June 2025) was a Malawian politician for Mwanza West. She was a member of the Democratic Progressive Party and led the Public Appointments Committee until she became the Deputy Minister of Local Government, Unity and Culture.

== Life ==
Chitsulo was a member of the Democratic Progressive Party and the Malawi Parliamentary Women's Caucus. She represented the Mwanza West Constituency.

Chitsulo led the Public Appointments Committee (PAC) which included Francesca Masamba. In 2020 she took allegations of corruption against Masamba to the Anti-Corruption Bureau. Masamba was arrested because of allegations from a candidate applying to lead the Directorate of Public Officers Declarations. Masamba allegedly demanded a large payment in exchange for supporting the candidate's application.

In 2023 she and Ashems Songwe published "Why Malawi’s record cholera outbreak demands long-term solutions" in the New Humanitarian. They argued that at the forthcoming UN Water Conference in New York there should be an international move to improve sanitation including in Malawi. Cholera was becoming an increasing problem and although it is treatable the underlying causes are sustainable water, sanitation, and hygiene (aka WASH). Ten people a year usually die from Cholera in Malawi, but recently the figure was 1,500. Malawi intended to fix this they said but it could not do it alone.

In 2024, parliament discussed sending thousands of people to work in Israel. It was a controversial proposal, because it involved politicians getting involved in business. Chitsulo had led a mission to Israel to oversee the conditions as there were already hundreds of Malawians working there. Chitsulo reported that there were complaints but she believed this was due to high expectations and poor communication. Another MP Bertha Mackenzie Ndebele noted the high number of unemployed young people in her constituency and she supported the proposal.

In May 2024 Chitsulo's Public Appointments Committee demanded that the Ministry of Foreigns Affairs should recall all of their staff working abroad who were principal officers who had not been vetted by the PAC. The request came after David Bisnowaty's appointment to be Malawi's charge d'affaires in Israel. PAC approve all senior appointments but it appears that this had been avoided by the Ministry of Foreigns Affairs. Chitsulo accused the ministry of appointing principal officers on a temporary basis as they could in theory lead an embassy for four years without any oversight by the PAC. Bisnowaty (an ex MP) and Nancy Tembo argued that the oversight was unnecessary and Bisnowaty was volunteering for the role. Chitsulo and civil society supporters wanted Bisnowaty to be approved and they found the argument that he was a volunteer, when he was controlling the embassy's funds, was dubious. Chitsulo's Public Appointments Committee was also concerned with public officials working in Malawi. All public officials are required by law to declare their assets and they should have been doing this for ten years. There were just over 14,500 public officers but in the last year 1,788 had failed to make the necessary declaration. She conceded that this was less than last year but she demanded that these people should be dismissed for failing to follow the law.

President Lazurus Chakwera appointed Chitsulo as the Deputy Minister of Local Government, Unity and Culture and as a result she was replaced in January 2025 by Grant Ndecha as the chair of the PAC.

== Death ==
Chitsulo died after collapsing at her home on 6 June 2025 at the age of 47. Monica Chang'anamuno who was then the Minister of Defence said that she "was a gift for Mwanza and Malawi". Her daughter Maureen Chirwa successfully stood as a candidate MP for Mwanza West in the 2025 Malawian general election.
