= Maureen Chirwa =

Malawian politician

Maureen Chitsulo Chirwa
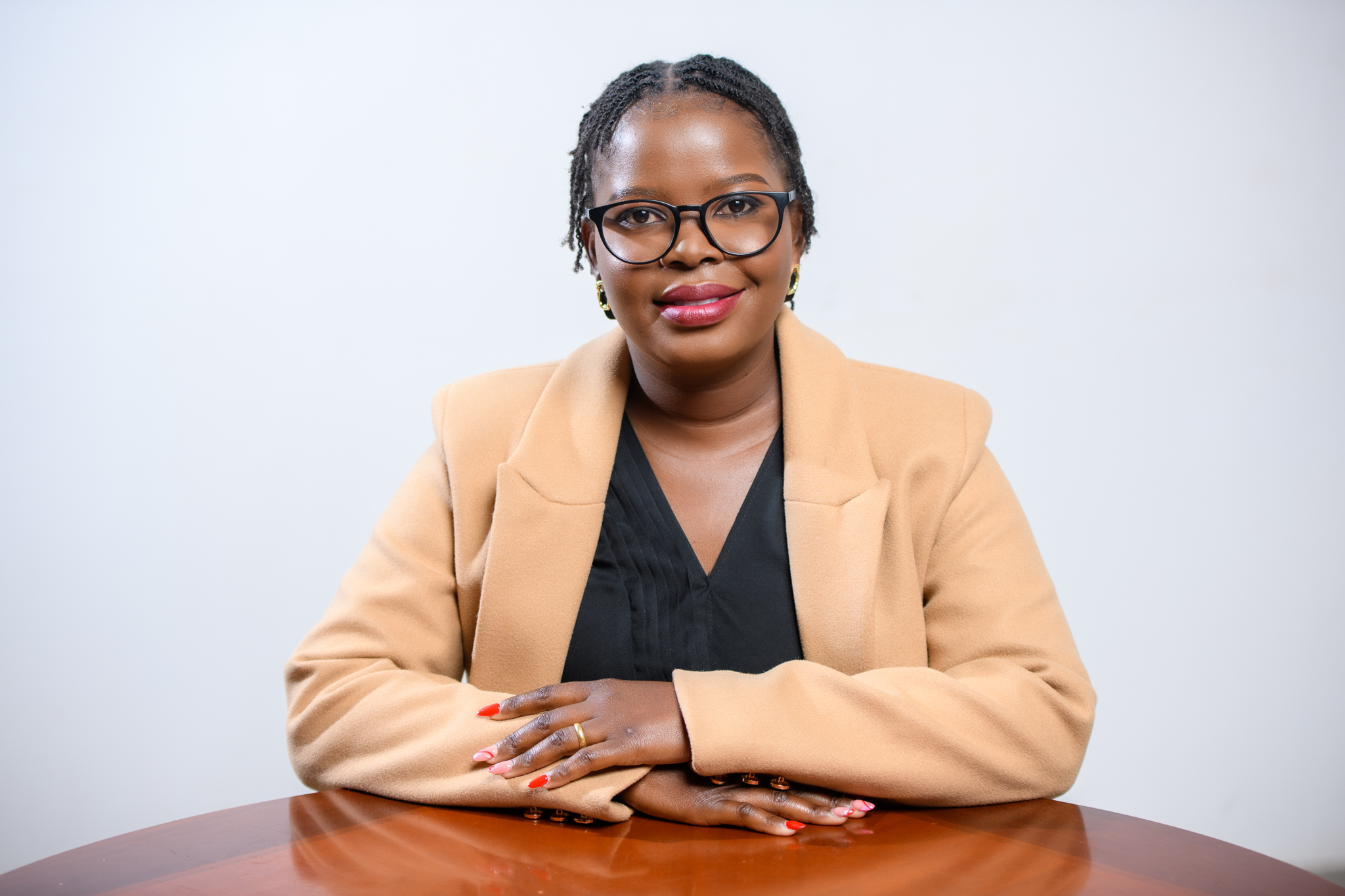
- Honourable Maurine Chifundo Nseula MP
- Other name: Maureen Chifundo Nseula
- Occupation: politician
- Known for: taking over her mother's role as MP
- Predecessor: Joyce Chitsulo
- Political party: Malawi Congress Party
- Parent: Joyce Chitsulo

Maureen Chitsulo Chirwa, also known as Maurine Chifundo Nseula, is a Malawian politician elected in 2025 for the Malawi Congress Party. She is the daughter and successor to her mother Joyce Chitsulo who died in the same year as Maureen was elected.

== Life ==
Chirwa is the eldest of four children and the successor to her mother Joyce Chitsulo who died aged 47 in 2025, the same year that Maureen was elected. Joyce had been the member of parliament for Mwanza West and she had been buried with full military honours.

At the funeral the traditional Senior Chief Govati made it clear to those gathered, and to then President Lazarus Chakwera that negotiations were open with the family to have a successor to Joyce Chitsulo. Govati said this would allow her work to continue smoothly. Maureen took over her position to stand in the 2025 general election. Her courage was recognised as was the doubts over her ability to take over from her mother.

Chirwa gave her maiden speech in parliament in November 2025. She thanked the voters of Mzanza South and the leaders of the Malawi Congress Party including Lazarus Chakwera for their confidence in her. She acknowledged that she had been given the opportunity despite there being other worthy candidates.
