= District commissioner (Malawi) =

A district commissioner is an executive post in Malawi for the appointee in charge of the districts (prefectures) or administrative localities in Malawi.

== Background ==
There are 28 Districts in Malawi. The role is similar to that of a governor. The position of direct commissioner is appointed by the President of Malawi. District commissioners are charged with being the point of contact for districts, including being the first respondents of emergency relief in Malawi. The District Assemblies are housed in the District Commissioners Office (DCO). The role of district commissioner dates back to Malawi's colonial legacy. From 1996 onwards, though, the members of the District Development Committees were the district commissioner as chairman, traditional chiefs, Local Officials, Party Representatives, Local Members of Parliament and a number of other appointed representatives.

== Authority of District Commissioners ==
District Commissioners emerged from a colonial post. Banda used them to have access to rural areas. District commissioners are still appointed by Malawi's central government and are senior administrators in a district who manage district finances. The district commissioner is the chief executive of the district.
