= Rastafari in Malawi =

Rastafarians are the fastest growing spiritual and cultural movement in Malawi. They represent 5.6% of Malawi's religious minority which include Hindus, Baha'is, Jews and Sikhs. While a sector of the Rastafari community follow it as a religion, others have adopted it as a way of life. As in other parts of the world, Rastafari in Malawi was influenced by the spread of reggae music. Malawi has an estimated Rastafari population of around 15,000 people, as either a formal religion or a way of life.

Just a year after Malawi attained its independence from the United Kingdom in 1964, His Imperial Majesty, Emperor Haile Selassie, visited the country from 2 to 4 August 1965. He was the first foreign dignitary to visit Malawi. It would also mark his only visit to the country in his lifetime. At the time of his visit to Malawi, Rastafari had not formalized itself, as most Malawians would not be exposed to its tenets until a few decades later. During one of his visits to the former colonial capital of Zomba, Malawi, he was driven up to the mountain plateau, to the spot facing Phalombe. The Shire Highlands would be named "The Emperor's View" in his honor. Despite taking almost three decades for Rastafari to be recognised in Malawi, his visit would stimulate the growth of the movement in the country. Since the advent of democracy in 1994, Rastafarians from all parts of Malawi have held an annual event commemorating his visit to the country every August of each year.

== Rastafari in Pre-Democratic Malawi (pre-1994) ==
Despite the presence of Rastafarians in pre-democratic Malawi, they were largely underground. This is attributed to the fact that after Malawi attained its independence in 1964, the then Prime Minister Hastings Banda felt that the constitution he had inherited from his colonial predecessors did not reflect the reality of an independent African nation. In response to this, he called for the dismantling of the constitution, which effectively meant that the principles that are prevalent in any democracy were virtually non-existent. For Banda, Malawi had its democracy and there was no need to adopt a western-style of democracy that had no bearing to the realities facing an African society. Two years after the country had attained its independence, Malawi adopted a new constitution which gave Banda, who eventually became President of Malawi, unlimited powers effectively making the country a one-party state. In 1971, Banda was declared President for life on the premise that he was a divinely appointed ruler.

Although there were claims of religious freedom under the Banda regime, it was largely in favour of mainstream Christianity. This was to the detriment of other religious minorities existing in Malawi; notably Muslims, Baha'i, Hindus, Sikhs and adherents of African Traditional Religions. In effect, Rastas found it difficult to express their faith freely in such an environment. As Rastas in Malawi are generally noted for the wearing of dreadlocks, they further had to contend with a piece of legislation known as the Decency in Dress Act of 1973. Initially, this act started as a dress policy, but due to concerns that the style of dressing by the youth was bringing down the moral standards of the country on the part of the Banda government, it became part of the national law until the early part of the 1990s. One measure of this legislation was for men to keep their hair short. As a result of this legislation, Rastas from other countries find it difficult to travel to Malawi. It was rumoured that around 1980, Jamaican reggae musician Bob Marley planned to visit Malawi only to be turned away by the Malawian authorities on the basis that he refused to shave off his locks. Because of the lack of conducive conditions to express their faith freely, some Rastas were forced into exile in other countries.

During Malawi's one-party era, the Malawi Broadcasting Corporation (MBC), the country's sole broadcaster at the time, exercised editorial control over radio programming. Despite this controlled broadcasting environment and official suspicion toward Rastafari, reggae music continued to receive airtime and played a significant role in the dissemination of Rastafari ideas and culture in Malawi. However, certain songs were subject to censorship or restricted broadcast because their lyrical content was considered politically sensitive or inconsistent with official broadcasting policies. Nevertheless, reggae remained an important medium through which Rastafari ideas and culture spread in Malawi.

== Rastafari in Democratic Malawi (1994–present) ==
With the advance of democracy in 1994, including the development of a new constitution, Rastas in Malawi found themselves in a position where they were able to express their faith freely. Despite this, Rastas in Malawi have had to navigate their identities in a society that is predominantly Christian and socially conservative. Among some of the concerns has been the issue of hair policy. Despite the repeal of the Decency in Dress Act in the early 1990s, public schools have had to uphold a hair policy implemented by the Ministry of Education, which forbade pupils from wearing their hair long. This is despite there being no law that prohibited it as was seen during the Banda regime. As a result of this, it has prompted some parents of Rasta children to send them to private schools, which are generally expensive by Malawi's standards. Rasta children further have to contend with a school curriculum that does not include them. In 2023, the High Court of Malawi made a ruling that it was unconstitutional to discriminate against learners on the basis of their hairstyle.

Despite this ruling, Rastas in Malawi continue to grapple with a number of challenges, among them laws regarding Cannabis (drug), which continues to be illegal under the laws of the country. At present, it has only been legalized for medicinal and industrial purposes, not recreational or religious use.

== Notable Rastafarians ==
- Evison Matafale, reggae musician and founder of Black Missionaries
