= District Commissioner (film) =

- Directed by: Shan Benson
- Produced by: Lee Robinson executive Stanley Hawes
- Starring: Tom Ellis; John West
- Release date: 1963
- Running time: 27 minutes
- Country: Australia
- Language: English

District Commissioner is a 1963 Australian documentary about Tom Ellis, a district commissioner in Papua New Guinea.
