= Chiradzulu District =

District of Malawi

Coordinates: 15°42′S 35°10′E

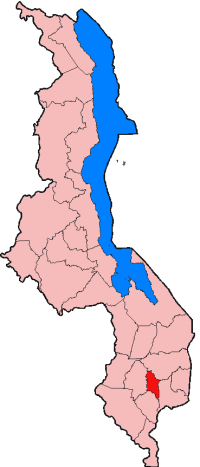
Location of Chiradzulu District in Malawi

Chiradzulu is a district in the Southern Region of Malawi. The capital is Chiradzulu. The district covers an area of 761 km.² and has a population of 356,875

== Demographics ==
At the time of the 2018 Census of Malawi, the distribution of the population of Chiradzulu District by ethnic group was as follows:

- 69.3% Lomwe
- 18.6% Yao
- 4.2% Ngoni
- 3.2% Chewa
- 1.9% Nyanja
- 1.7% Mang'anja
- 0.4% Sena
- 0.3% Tumbuka
- 0.1% Tonga
- 0.0% Nkhonde
- 0.0% Lambya
- 0.0% Sukwa
- 0.2% Others

== Government and administrative divisions ==
There are five National Assembly constituencies in Chiradzulu:

- Chiradzulu - Central
- Chiradzulu - East
- Chiradzulu - North
- Chiradzulu - South
- Chiradzulo - West

Since the 2009 general election all of these constituencies have been represented by politicians from the Democratic Progressive Party.

== Notable people ==
Harry Kambwiri Matecheta aka Reverend Harry (1870 – 1962) was born here he became the first African clergy and moderator in Malawi. Roseby Dinala was born here in 1937. She went on to be a leading Malawi Congress Party supporter to both Hastings Banda and President Chakwera.

== See also ==
- Masanjala
