= Thyolo District =

District of Malawi

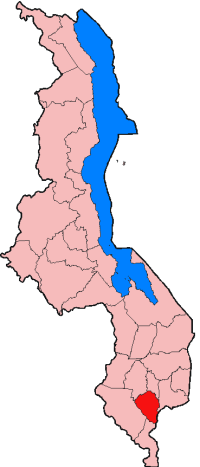
Thyolo District

The Thyolo district is one of the 28 districts in Malawi. The capital is Thyolo. The district covers an area of 1,715 km². and has a population of 458,976.

== Demographics ==
At the time of the 2018 Census of Malawi, the distribution of the population of Thyolo District by ethnic group was as follows:

- 50.2% Lomwe
- 12.3% Mang'anja
- 6.3% Ngoni
- 6.0% Tumbuka
- 5.1% Yao
- 3.2% Sena
- 2.1% Chewa
- 0.1% Nkhonde
- 0.0% Lambya
- 0.0% Sukwa
- 8.1% Others

== Government and administrative divisions ==
There are seven National Assembly constituencies in Thyolo:

- Thyolo - Central
- Thyolo - East
- Thyolo - North
- Thyolo - South
- Thyolo - South West
- Thyolo - Thava
- Thyolo - West

Since the 2009 election, all of these constituencies have been held by members of the Democratic Progressive Party (DPP).

In the 2025 election the Thyolo Goliati constituency was won by Maureen Namwali of the DPP.
