= Machinga District =

District of Malawi

Coordinates: 14°55′S 35°40′E

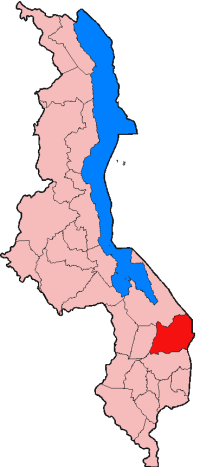
Location of Machinga District in Malawi

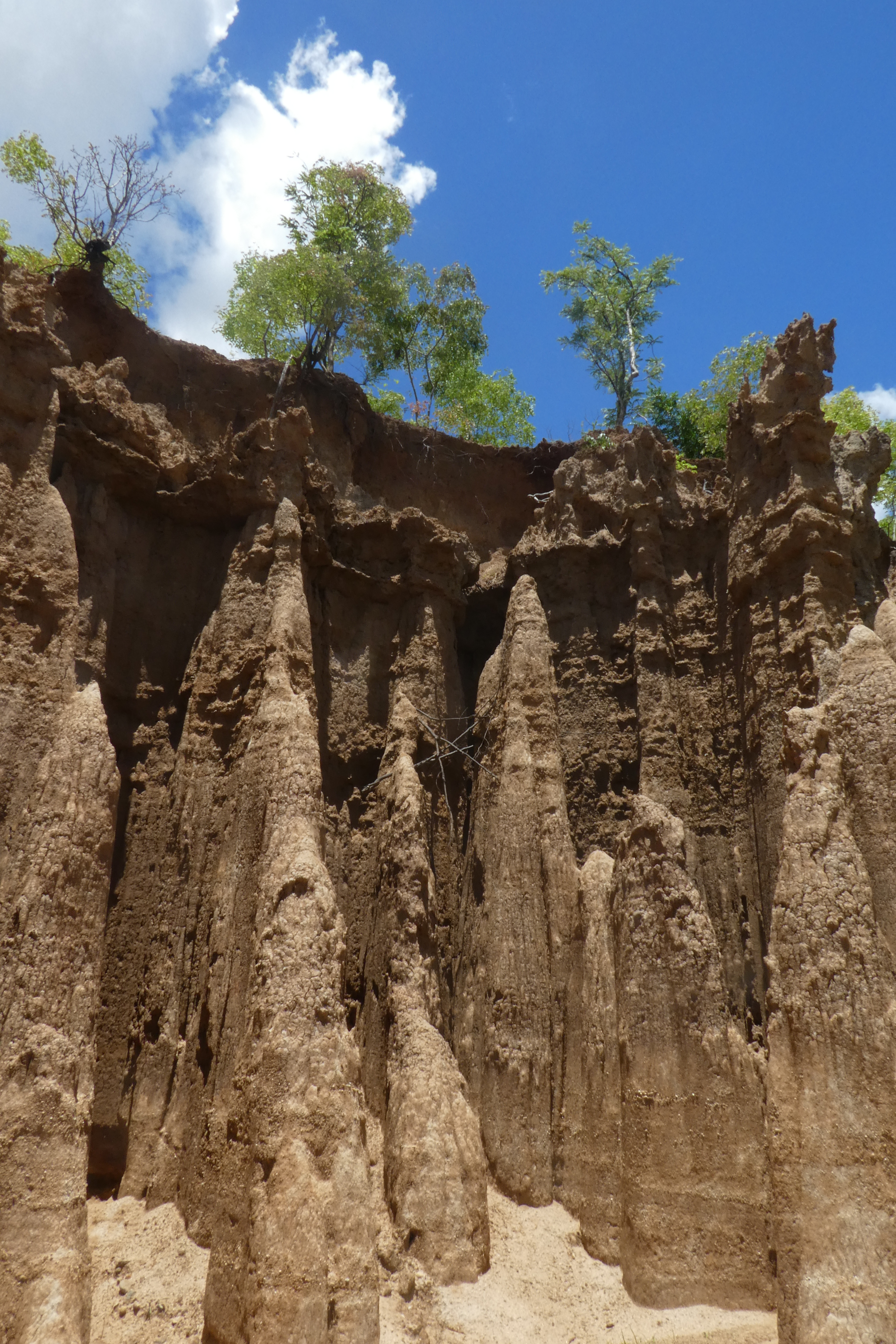
The Chikala Pillars

Machinga is a district in the Southern Region of Malawi. The capital is Machinga. The district covers an area of 3,771 km.² and has a population of 369,614.

== Demographics ==
At the time of the 2018 Census of Malawi, the distribution of the population of Machinga District by ethnic group was as follows:

- 57.8% Yao
- 27.5% Lomwe
- 6.4% Chewa
- 5.4% Nyanja
- 0.9% Ngoni
- 0.7% Mang'anja
- 0.7% Sena
- 0.3% Tumbuka
- 0.0% Nkhonde
- 0.0% Lambya
- 0.0% Sukwa
- 0.1% Others

== Government and administrative divisions ==
There are seven National Assembly constituencies in Machinga:

- Machinga - Central
- Machinga - Central East
- Machinga - East
- Machinga - Likwenu
- Machinga - North East
- Machinga - South
- Machinga - South East represented by Fyness Magonjwa in 2019.

Since the 2009 general election most of these constituencies (except Machinga Central and Machinga Likwenu, which have been held by members of the Democratic Progressive Party) have been represented by politicians from the United Democratic Front.
