= National Statistical Office of Malawi =

National Statistical Office of Malawi (NSO)
- Type: Government
- Industry: Government Department
- Founded: 1965
- Headquarters: Zomba, Malawi
- Products: Statistical Reports
- Website: www.nsomalawi.mw

The National Statistical Office of Malawi (NSO) is the main government department responsible for the collection and dissemination of official statistics in Malawi. It has headquarters in Zomba and 300 employees, and operates under the 2013 Statistics Act. The NSO also has regional offices in the major urban centres of Lilongwe, Mzuzu, and Blantyre.

== Headquarters and administration ==
Situated off Chimbiya Road, Zomba, the NSO Headquarters contains the offices of the Commissioner of Statistics and Deputy Commissioner of Statistics, together with the general administration, accounts and human resources departments.

The administration section also deals with first enquiries for statistical data from the general public, and with product sales.

== Economics ==
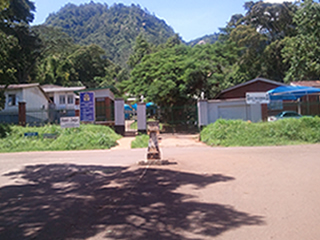
The Economics Division and Technical Services division.

The Economics Division produces statistics on foreign trade, national accounts, balance of payments, business activity, employment, consumer prices (including inflation), industrial production, poverty and tourism. Major surveys include the Annual Economic Survey, the 5-yearly Integrated Household Survey, and Small and Medium Scale business surveys.

The information technology department is also situated at this campus.

== Demography and Social Statistics ==
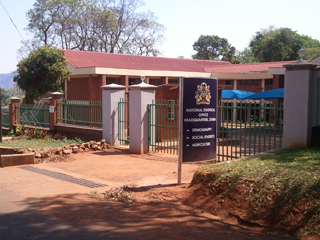
Demography and Social Statistics Division

The Demography Division is responsible for the Population and Housing Census, which takes place every ten years, and a number of other demographic and social surveys, such as the Demographic and Health Survey (DHS) and Multiple Indicator Cluster Survey (MICS).

== Agriculture ==
The Agriculture Division conducts agricultural surveys, like the National Census of Agriculture and Livestock. Another survey conducted by the division is the Welfare Monitoring Surveys (WMS).

== Publications ==
The following are some of the publications (Reports) produced by the National Statistical Office of Malawi:

- Population and Housing Census
- Integrated Household Survey
- Demographic and Household Survey
- Annual Economic Survey
- Welfare and Monitoring Survey
