= Neno District =

District of Malawi

Coordinates: 16°10′S 35°10′E

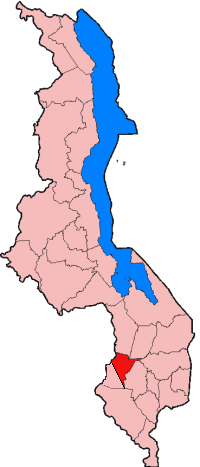
Location of Neno District in Malawi

Neno is a district in the Southern Region of Malawi. The capital is Neno. In 2018, Neno District had a population of 138,291.

Neno District was created in 2003 when Mwanza District was split into two districts, Neno and Mwanza, under the decentralisation program.

== Demographics ==
At the time of the 2018 Census of Malawi, the distribution of the population of Neno District by ethnic group was as follows:

- 66.4% Ngoni
- 13.1% Lomwe
- 9.6% Chewa
- 4.8% Mang'anja
- 2.1% Yao
- 2.0% Sena
- 0.5% Tumbuka
- 0.2% Nyanja
- 0.1% Tonga
- 0.1% Nkhonde
- 0.1% Lambya
- 0.0% Sukwa
- 1.0% Others

== Government and administrative divisions ==
There are three National Assembly constituencies in Neno:

- Neno - North
- Neno - South

 Neno - East

Since the 2009 election both constituencies have been held by members of the Democratic Progressive Party.

In 2025 Neno South was represented by Mutani Tambala. She was elected to parliament at the same time as Mary Maulidi Khembo also became a Democratic Progressive Party MP. Khembo was elected in a newly formed constituency Neno East after demarcstions. Thoko Tembo on the other hand retained his seat in Neno North making him the first ever MP to be reelected in Neno North. He won with 86% mandate. He is currently the Deputy Minister of Agriculture, irrigations and water development. Activists who had been trying to encourage women candidates held Neno up as "Malawi’s top performer in women’s political representation" since Neno has two female MPs and one female councillor Martha Chapendeka in Neno North.
