= Nsanje District =

District of Malawi

- District
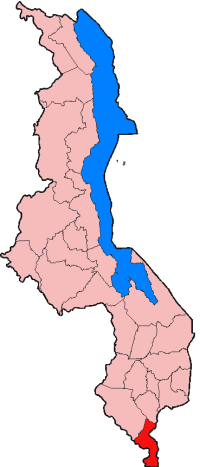
- Location of Nsanje District in Malawi
- Coordinates: 16°45′S 35°10′E
- Country: Malawi
- Region: Southern Region

Area
  - Total: 1,942 km^{2} (750 sq mi)
- Elevation: 61 m (200 ft)
- Highest elevation: 610 m (2,000 ft)

Population (2018)
  - Total: 299,168
  - Density: 154.1/km^{2} (399.0/sq mi)

Nsanje is a district in the Southern Region of Malawi. The capital is Nsanje. The district covers an area of 1,942 square kilometres (750 sq mi) and has a population of 194,924.

In addition to the city of Nsanje, it has the towns of Bangula, Marka, Tengani, and Fatima.

Marka is the southernmost city in Malawi and on the edge of the dry border with Mozambique (Vila Nova de Fronteira).

== Location ==
Nsanje is the southernmost district in Malawi and lies in the Lower Shire River Valley. It straddles the Shire River in the north (the river forms most of Nsanje's eastern boundary) and is surrounded by Mozambique. Elevation is around 200 feet (61 m) ASL except for some hills in the south-western part of the district which reach near to 2,000 feet (610 m) ASL. Mwabvi Game Reserve lies in the north-western part of the district and can be accessed from Bangula or Sorgin (both along the M-1 road) Elephant Marsh lies partially in the northern part of the district and can be accessed for tours via the eastern bank road. Tours start from the village of James.

== Government and administrative divisions ==
There are five National Assembly constituencies in Nsanje:

- Nsanje - Central
- Nsanje - Lalanje
- Nsanje - North
- Nsanje - South
- Nsanje - South West

In the 2009 election all of these constituencies were held by members of the Democratic Progressive Party.

In 2019 the Lalanje constituency was won by Gladys Ganda who was the DPP candidate.

The Nsanje South West constituency was represented by Eurita Valeta in 2024 who had been elected in 2019.

== Climate ==
Temperatures get as hot as 52 °C (126 °F) in November and around 8 °C (46 °F) in June. Rainfall averages around 750 millimetres (30 in) yearly coming January through April.

== Economy ==
Nsanje is one of the poorest districts in Malawi and is virtually dependent on government and NGO aide organizations Major income comes from small holder farming. Maize, millet, sorghum, rice, sweet potatoes, beans and cotton are all grown using almost entirely rain fed agriculture.

Maize is grown in marshes post rain season; Nsanje Boma they grow around Ndindi marsh area, Bangula they use Chisamba and Makhanga marshes.

Nsanje district has a lot of livestock; cattle, goats, sheep, domesticated birds. Most of the rich people in Nsanje accumulated their wealth through livestock farming. Major buyer of cattle in the Nsanje District is Sidik Mia. Fishing is another economic activity that sustains lives of many.

Nsanje was devastated by a flood in January 2015. A 20-kilometre-long vein of cropland on the east bank of the Shire River was overwhelmed, destroying resources needed to sustain the population for a year. Other areas of Malawi were also devastated by flood around this time.

== Demographics ==
At the time of the 2018 Census of Malawi, the distribution of the population of Nsanje District by ethnic group was as follows:

- 84.0% Sena
- 7.3% Lomwe
- 5.0% Mang'anja
- 0.9% Chewa
- 0.7% Yao
- 0.5% Ngoni
- 0.4% Tonga
- 0.2% Tumbuka
- 0.0% Nkhonde
- 0.0% Nyanja
- 0.0% Lambya
- 0.0% Sukwa
- 0.8% Others

== Culture ==
The people of Nsanje are traditionally Sena people, Lomwe, or Mang'anja. The predominant language is Chisena, but Chimang'anja, Chichewa, English, and Portuguese are also spoken. A rain cult holds position south of Nsanje boma worshipping a deity called M'bona. His head was cut off hundreds of years ago and out flowed a river of blood called Ndione. He now returns to his wife's home every so often in the form of a python to tell prophecies for the coming year.

Traditional dance of Nsanje district is usually danced by women, Madzoka danced by traditional healers, Ulimba usually performed after burial.
