= Ntchisi District =

District of Malawi

Coordinates: 13°20′S 34°00′E

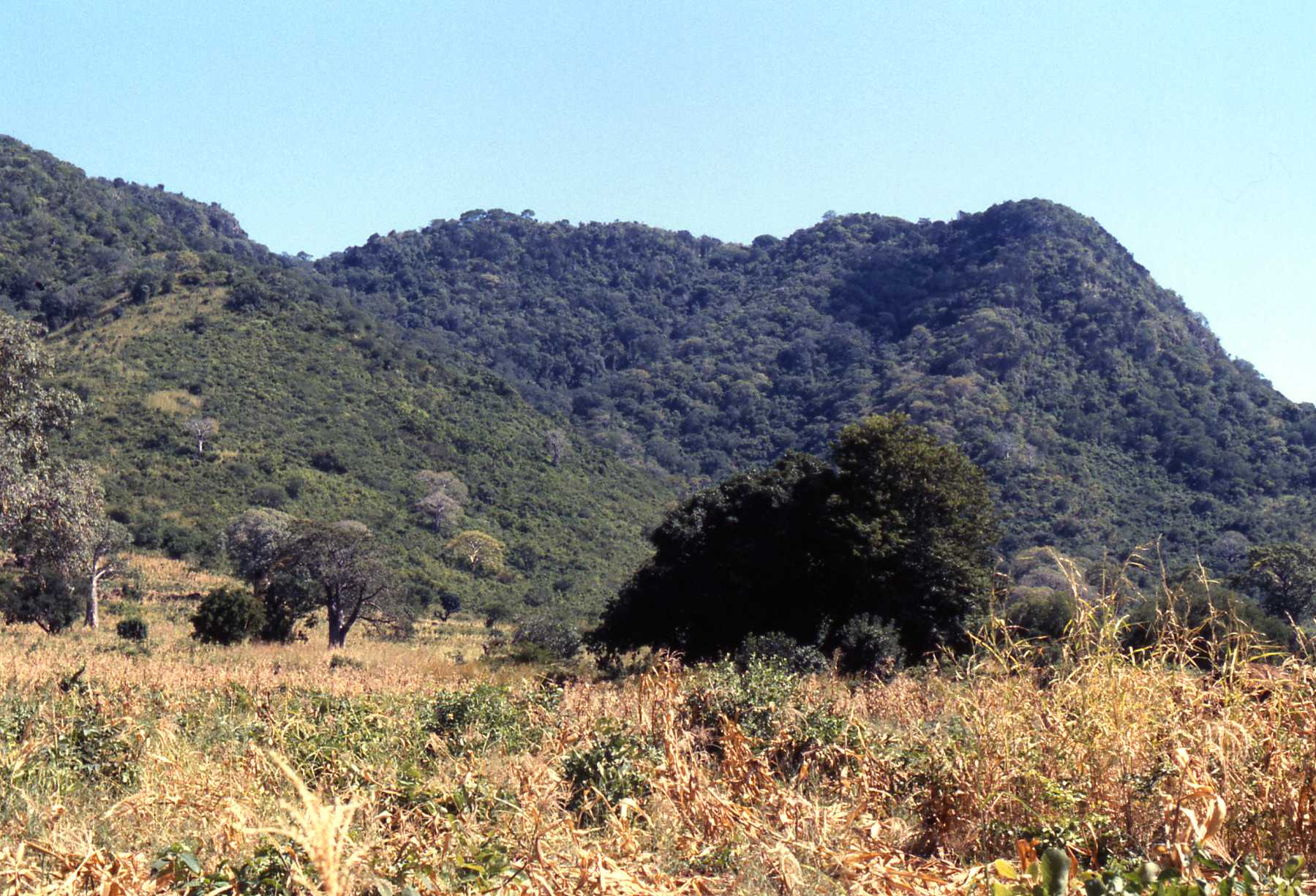
Ntchisi Mountain, Malawi

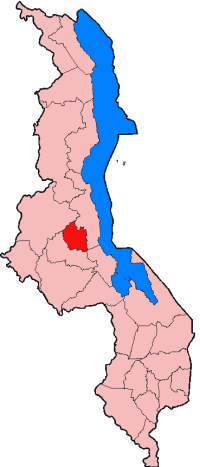
Location of Ntchisi District in Malawi

Ntchisi is a district in the Central Region of Malawi. The district covers an area of 1,655 km.² and has a population of 317,069. The capital is Ntchisi.

== Geography ==
Ntchisi District has a population density of about 128 people per square kilometer. The province is all between 1,300 and 1,700 meters above sea level. About half (north and west) is hilly, while the other half (south and east) is generally flat. The average temperature is about 20 degrees Celsius.

== Economy ==
Farming and agriculture makes up eighty percent of the local economy with a couple of the leading crops being beans and potatoes. Forestry, irrigation and livestock herding are other fields, since the economy has very little private industry and the government employs most of the people. At the turn of the 21st century, the poverty rate was about seventy-five percent. The district (and country) has received many forms of help from many agencies, including the European Union, DFID, the African Development Bank, UNICEF and the World Health Organization.

== Health concerns ==
A 1989 survey found that the infant mortality rate was almost one-quarter (228/1000), and that those who did survive faced an alarming lack of sanitation services. UNICEF has done substantial work in the area.

== Demographics ==
At the time of the 2018 Census of Malawi, the distribution of the population of Ntchisi District by ethnic group was as follows:

- 97.9% Chewa
- 0.9% Ngoni
- 0.4% Tumbuka
- 0.3% Lomwe
- 0.3% Yao
- 0.1% Tonga
- 0.0% Mang'anja
- 0.0% Sena
- 0.0% Nyanja
- 0.0% Lambya
- 0.0% Nkhonde
- 0.0% Sukwa
- 0.0% Others

== Government and administrative divisions ==
There are four National Assembly constituencies in Ntchisi District:

- Ntchisi – East
- Ntchisi – North
- Ntchisi – North East
- Ntchisi – South

Since the 2009 election most of these constituencies (except Ntchisi North East, which has been held by members of the Malawi Congress Party) have been held by members of the Malawi Congress Party. The MCP's Olipa Chimangeni was elected in 2014 for the north east constituency. She was re-elected in 2019 where she was one of 45 women elected to a parliament with 193 seats.

Jacquiline Chikuta became the MP for Ntchisi, North in 2019. She served until her death in 2021 as a result on the COVID-19 pandemic.

== Tourism ==
The main attraction is the 75 square kilometer Ntchisi Mountain Forest Reserve on Ntchisi Mountain, which is one of the last areas to preserve some species of indigenous plants. There also is a lodge specially designed for international tourists.
