= Salima District =

District of Malawi

Coordinates: 13°45′S 34°30′E

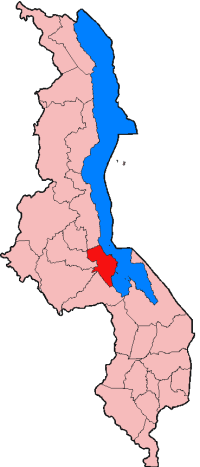
Location of Salima District in Malawi

Salima is a district in the Central Region of Malawi. The city of Salima is the district's capital. The district covers an area of 2,196 km.² and has a population of 478,346. The beach at Senga Bay is the weekend retreat of many from the capital, Lilongwe, and has hosted the annual Lake of Stars festival since 2008, when it was moved from Chintheche in order to be less remote. There is a range of accommodation options in the area, though most are a few kilometers off the main road.

== Demographics ==
At the 2018 Census of Malawi, the distribution of the population of Salima district by ethnic group was as follows:

- 72.9% Chewa
- 19.0% Yao
- 2.9% Ngoni
- 2.0% Lomwe
- 1.0% Tumbuka
- 0.7% Nyanja
- 0.5% Tonga
- 0.4% Sena
- 0.3% Mang'anja
- 0.1% Nkhonde
- 0.0% Lambya
- 0.0% Sukwa
- 0.1% Others

== Government and administrative divisions ==
There are five National Assembly constituencies in Salima:

- Salima - Central
- Salima - North
- Salima - South
- Salima - South East
- Salima - North West

Since the 2009 election most of these constituencies (except Salima South, which has been held by members of the Democratic Progressive Party), have been held by members of the Malawi Congress Party.

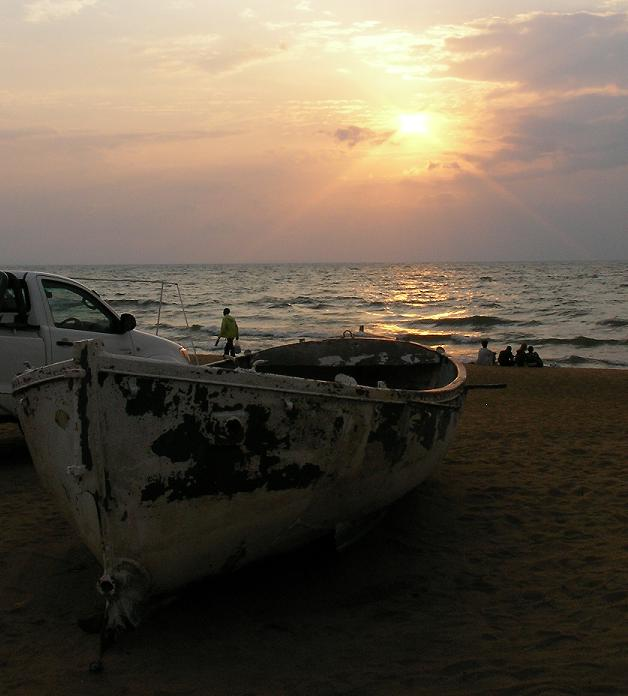
Senga Bay beach

== Villages ==
- Mbaluko
