= Districts of Malawi =

A clickable map of Malawi exhibiting its 28 districts.

Malawi is divided into 28 districts within three regions. As the primary administrative unit in the country, each district is headed by a District Commissioner:

Region	Name	Population (2018)	Total Area (km^{2})	Capital	Index						
Region	Name	Population (2018)	Total Area (km^{2})	Capital	Index	Central	Dedza	830,512	3,754	Dedza	1
Dowa	772,569	3,077	Dowa	2		Central					
Kasungu	842,953	8,017	Kasungu	3		Central					
Lilongwe	2,626,901	6,211	Lilongwe	4		Central					
Mchinji	602,305	3,131	Mchinji	5		Central					
Nkhotakota	393,077	4,338	Nkhotakota	6		Central					
Ntcheu	659,608	3,251	Ntcheu	7		Central					
Ntchisi	317,069	1,709	Ntchisi	8		Central					
Salima	478,346	2,151	Salima	9		Central					
Northern	Chitipa	234,927	4,334	Chitipa	10						
Northern	Karonga	365,028	3,416	Karonga	11						
Northern	Likoma	14,527	20	Likoma	12						
Northern	Mzimba	1,161,456	10,473	Mzimba	13						
Northern	Nkhata Bay	284,681	4,182	Nkhata Bay	14						
Northern	Rumphi	229,161	4,560	Rumphi	15						
Southern	Balaka	438,379	2,142	Balaka	16						
Southern	Blantyre	1,251,484	2,025	Blantyre	17						
Southern	Chikwawa	564,684	4,878	Chikwawa	18						
Southern	Chiradzulu	356,875	761	Chiradzulu	19						
Southern	Machinga	735,438	3,582	Machinga	20						
Southern	Mangochi	1,148,611	6,729	Mangochi	21						
Southern	Mulanje	684,107	2,005	Mulanje	22						
Southern	Mwanza	130,949	756	Mwanza	23						
Southern	Nsanje	299,168	1,945	Nsanje	24						
Southern	Thyolo	721,456	1,666	Thyolo	25						
Southern	Phalombe	429,450	1,323	Phalombe	26						
Southern	Zomba	851,737	2,405	Zomba	27						
Southern	Neno	138,291	1,561	Neno	28						

== See also ==
- ISO 3166-2:MW

== Other sources ==
- "Parliament of Malawi". Archived from the original on 2017-05-05.
