= Mangochi District =

District of Malawi

Coordinates: 14°30′S 35°15′E

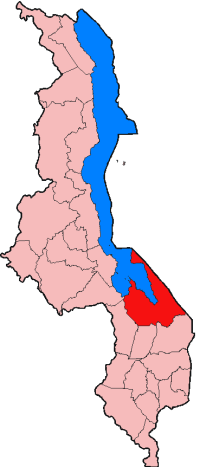
Location of Mangochi District in Malawi

The Mangochi District is a district in Malawi. It is bordered by Mozambique to the east and north Salima to the north. To the west, it is bordered by Dedza. Traveling south, the road climbs up the Machinga escarpment to Zomba, the former colonial capital of Nyasaland, and from there to Malawi's commercial hub of Blantyre (named after David Livingstone's hometown near Glasgow). It is fiercely hot in summer and ambient in winter. It is on the flood-plain for Lake Malawi (formerly Lake Nyassa). The lake is the third largest and most southerly in the Rift Valley lake system (the others being Lake Victoria and Lake Tanganyika), and is unofficially known as the Lake of Stars. The lake was named by David Livingston as he discovered it on September 18, 1859, for the effect of the reflection of the sun on the water's surface. It is also known as the Calendar Lake as it is approx 365 miles (587 km) long and 52 wide.

There are beautiful fish - cichlids and fish eagles. a member of the same genus as the American bald eagle. Most of the indigenous people of Mangochi are the Yao people.

== Demographics ==
At the time of the 2018 Census of Malawi, the distribution of the population of Mangochi District by ethnic group was as follows:

- 69.1% Yao
- 10.2% Lomwe
- 8.0% Chewa
- 6.2% Tumbuka
- 2.7% Sena
- 1.5% Mang'anja
- 0.5% Tonga
- 0.1% Nkhonde
- 0.0% Lambya
- 0.0% Sukwa
- 0.4% Others

== Government and administrative divisions ==
There are thirteen National Assembly constituencies in Mangochi:

1. Mangochi - Central
2. Mangochi - East
3. Mangochi - Lutende
4. Mangochi - Malombe
5. Mangochi - Monkey Bay
6. Mangochi - Nkungulu
7. Mangochi - North
8. Mangochi - North East
9. Mangochi - South
10. Mangochi - South West

In the 2009 general election most of these constituencies (except Mangochi Monkey Bay, which has been held by members of the Democratic Progressive Party) have been represented by politicians from the United Democratic Front. This trend did not continue though. The Mangochi - Nkungulu constituency was represented by UDF member Aisha Adams and UDF's Lilian Patel was the MP for Mangothi East in 2024. Others included Francesca Masamba was the DPP member for the East constituency and Victoria Kingstone was the central MP.

The district is also home to a smart city, the Goshen City.
