= 2018 census of Malawi =

Malawian census

Sixth census of Malawi
- September 3-23, 2018

General information
- Country: Malawi

Results
- Total population: 17,563,749 (▲34.8%)
- Most populous region: Southern (7,750,629)
- Least populous region: Northern (2,289,780)

The 2018 Malawi census was the sixth national census in Malawi, which took place on 3-23 September 2018. The population of Malawi was counted as 17,563,749 – an increase of 4,534,251 (34.8%) over the 2008 census.

Preliminary results from the 2018 census were released to the public in December 2018 and final results in May 2019, from the National Statistical Office of Malawi website. The next Malawian census is set to be held in September 2028.

== Projections ==
The 2018 projected population of Malawi was 17,931,637 based on the medium variant of projections based on the 2008 census. The actual enumerated population was 17,563,749 which was about 98% the size of the 2018 projection.

== Results ==
=== Population and dwellings ===
Population counts for regions of Malawi. All figures are for the census de jure population count.

Region	Population	%
Southern	7,750,629	44.13
Central	7,523,340	42.83
Northern	2,289,780	13.04
Malawi	17,563,749	100

- Resident population count was 17,563,749, up 4,534,251 from the 2008 census.
  - There are 8,521,460 males in Malawi (48.52% of the population) and 9,042,289 females (51.48% of the population).
- On average, the population grew by around 2.9% per year since the 2008 census – slightly higher than the annual average growth between 1998 and 2008, which was 2.8%.

=== Birthplace ===
In 2018, 17,506,538 people (99.67%) were born in Malawi, with 57,211 (0.33%) born abroad.

Birthplace	Responses		Change from 2008	
Birthplace	Number	%	Number	pp
Malawi	17,506,538	99.67	▲4,538,143	▲0.06
Abroad	57,211	0.33	▲5,687	▼0.06
Zambia	12,127	0.07	▲6,355	▲0.03
Mozambique	5,349	0.03	▼13,671	▼0.12
Zimbabwe	2,875	0.02	▼1,567	▼0.01
South Africa	1,736	0.01	▲297	▼0.00
Tanzania	1,252	0.01	▼1,235	▼0.01
United Kingdom	862	0.00	▼742	▼0.01
Other	33,010	0.19	▲16,220	▲0.06
Total	17,563,749	100	–	–

=== Ethnicity ===
The 2018 census asked a question on ethnicity for the first time and the five largest ethnic groups were Chewa (34.4%), Lomwe (18.9%), Yao (13.3%), Ngoni (10.4%), and Tumbuka (9.2%).

Data is for the population that stated their ethnicity.

Ethnic group	Population	%
Chewa	6,020,945	34.39
Lomwe	3,302,634	18.87
Yao	2,321,763	13.26
Ngoni	1,819,347	10.39
Tumbuka	1,614,955	9.23
Sena	670,908	3.83
Mang'anja	559,887	3.2
Nyanja	324,272	1.85
Tonga	310,031	1.77
Nyakyusa	174,430	1
Lambya	106,769	0.61
Sukwa	93,762	0.54
Other	186,319	1.06
Total	17,506,022	100

=== Religion ===
According to the 2018 census, 77.3% of the population identified as being Christian, 13.8% as Muslim, 2.1% identified as having no religion, 1.1% as having traditional religions, and 5.6% had other religions.

Religious affiliation	Population	%
Christian	13,581,623	77.33
Roman Catholic	3,028,435	17.24
Church of Central Africa Presbyterian	2,498,969	14.23
Seventh-day Adventist/Baptist/Apostolic	1,644,829	9.36
Pentecostal	1,332,420	7.59
Anglican	410,633	2.34
Other Christian	4,666,337	26.57
Islam	2,426,754	13.82
Irreligion	376,784	2.15
Traditional	186,284	1.06
Buddhism	5,506	0.03
Hinduism	3,211	0.02
Other	983,587	5.6
Total	17,563,749	100
