= Lambya people =

Ethnic group from Mbeya Region of Tanzania

The Lambya are an ethnic and linguistic group based along the border of northwestern Malawi, Ileje and in Momba District of Songwe Region, Tanzania. A minority also exists in Zambia. In 2001, the Lambya population was estimated to number about 85,000 (45,000 in Malawi and 40,000) (from a 1987 estimate)) in Tanzania. The Lambyas in Malawi speak Lambya language mainly by elders in rural areas, but the majority as well as young people speak Chitumbuka, which is the lingua franca of the Northern and some Central parts of Malawi.

The Lambyas in Malawi are ruled by Senior Chief Mwaulambya Chieftaincy. The headquarters of the chief is in Chinunkha, Chitipa district.

== Location ==
In Malawi, they are found within the traditional Authority Mwaulambia and Mweni Kameme in Chitipa District. Chitipa district is the north most district in northern region of Malawi (formerly known as Forthill during the colonial times). The present name Chitipa means big mud in Chitumbuka (Chitipa, in old Chitumbuka, and Chithipa, in modern Chitumbuka).

== Language ==
In Malawi, the Lambya people speak Lambya (ichilambya), mainly by older people but the majority of the population speak Chitumbuka language. In Tanzania, the Lambyas speak Lambya and Swahili which is the national language of Tanzania.

== The establishment and expansion of the Lambya Kingdom ==
Ulambya, as the country of the Lambya is called, covers an area of 367 square miles and has a population of roughly 20,000 people with an average density of 36 persons per square mile, the largest concentration being in the more fertile valleys of Kaseye, and the Songwe (Stobbs and Young, 1972: 40; Young and Brown, 1972: 30). The Lambya share a border to the north with the Ndali of Tanzania and the Nyiha on the west with the Namwanga of Zambia, on the south with the Fungwe, Tambo and the Tumbuka-speaking peoples of Mwenewenya, and on the east with the Sukwa.

Burial Rites

Death among the Lambya traditional is respected. Whenever death takes place whether of a man, woman, or a Child a series of funeral rites lasting a month or more begins. The first of the series is the burial (Kusyira umuvimba) which in the case of most adults last three or four days, though for rich man it may continue for a week and for a child it is over in a day.

As soon as death occurs most of the time women who are present begins wailing and messages are sent to the chiefs, the village headman and dead mans kinsmen and affine to announce the fact and bid them to the burial. The first message is sent to the father or to a senior brother or sister if one is still alive or calling them to heir of the dead person. The fact about the dead man is announced in the village by the chief, who usually get the consent to do so from the deceased family. In sending the passage to the chief the deceased family also asks the chief permission of a drum which is kept by the chief. This drum is used to send message further in the village and it acts a symbol of funeral. The drumming of the drum has got its rhythm that tells the people about the funeral as result they easily differentiate the funeral and the entertainment drum styles. To get all these permission the deceased family basically presents a hen or cock to the chief (umwene) and then the message spread.
