= Ireen Mambala =

Malawian Politician

- Born: Balaka District
- Known for: MP for the Balaka South Constituency from 2019
- Political party: Independent

Ireen Mambala is an independent Malawian politician. She was elected to the National Assembly to represent Balaka South in 2019 and a similar constituency in 2025.

== Life ==
Mambala was born in the rural area of Balaka District.

She stood as an independent in the Balaka South Constituency in 2019 and she was elected. She was the only woman to contest the election and she and her admirers see the victory against nine men as significant. She entered parliament but it appeared that no party had a majority and the hung parliament may have led to slow decisions. The Democratic Progressive Party President Peter Mutharika appealled to independants like Mambala to support the government. 32 agreed including Mambala, Susan Dossi, Lyana Lexa Tambala, Roseby Gadama, Abigail Shariff and Nancy Chaola Mdooko.

Mambala encourages others to feel empowered. She runs a project called "Give Me Books Not Husband or Wife".

The Rivi Rivi River which feeds the Shire River goes through her constituency. When it floods it damages crops and cuts off nearby communities. The community of Utale is known as Utale 1 and Utale 2 and when the river floods then children do not go to school.

In 2022 the river diverted by over 500 metres as the result of rainfall and Tropical Storm Ana. A village called Chipanga and the railway line were under threat if the trend continued. As it was the river was preventing people from using the existing road. Mambala negotiated with four local families in Nkaya for a new route to be established across their crops. She made them a present of two bags of maize and some money and thanked them publicly for their munificence. Those who were homeless due to the floods came mainly from Nkaya, Nsamala, Phimbi and Mpilisi. The homeless stayed in churches and schools but this could only be temporary as schools needed to teach. Fifty boxes of charity relief did arrive for the homeless who were obliged to live with friends.

She was a candidate in the Balaka Mulunguzi constituency and she had a narrow victory taking just over 30% on the votes. James Makhumula claimed that her as the true winner but Justice Charlotte Wezi Malonda rejected his claim. The percentage of women in parliament saw a small increase in 2025 and she was part of that. She was one of the successful independent women candidates that also included Madalitso Baloyi, Hope Tionge, Faless Debrah Moyo, Rhita Sanga, Khadija Chunga, Amina Kajiya, Abigail Shariff and Phoebe Chikaonda.
