= Wezzie Gondwe =

- Born: 15 August 1983
- Died: 1 September 2021 (aged 38); Johannesburg
- Other name: Wezie Gondwe
- Occupation: politician
- Predecessor: Emily Mwimba
- Successor: Richard Chavula
- Political party: Independent

Wezzie NtChindi Gondwe (1983 – 2021) was a Malawian politician who became the Independent MP for Mzimba East in 2019. She died aged 38 in 2021.

== Life ==
Gondwe was born in 1983.

She was a Malawian politician who became the Independent MP for Mzimba East in 2019. Campaigners had targeted obtaining 50:50 women's representation in parliament, but at the election only 45 out of 193 were elected. Gondwe was one of the 13 women who were successfully elected as independents. The others were Jacquiline Chikuta, Monica Chang'anamuno; Nancy Tembo; Nancy Chaola; Susan Dossi; Roseby Gadama; Esther Kathumba;Abigail Shariff; Gertrude Nankhumwa; Lyana Lexa Tambala and Eurita Ntiza Valeta. In 2019 she donated three and a half tonnes of maize to her constituents because they were short of food.

Gondwe joined parliament's Agriculture and Irrigation Committee and the Statutory Corporations and State Enterprises Committee.

Gondwe died in Garden City Hospital in Johannesburg in September 2021. She was the third MP to die that year. Both Martha Chanjo Lunji and Swithin Mkomba had died in July. This was during the COVID-19 pandemic in Malawi. Bi-elections were held for three constituencies on 26 October 2021.
