= Faless Debrah Moyo =

Malawian politician

- Occupation: politician
- Known for: only woman MP to represent Chitipa in 2025
- Political party: Independent

Faless Debrah Moyo is a Malawian politician who was elected in 2025 to represent the Chitipa North constituency as an independent.

== Life ==
Moyo stood as an independent and she won with over 5,300 votes in the Chitipa North constituency. She was said to be the first woman to win a constituency in Chitipa, but Chimango Mughogho had won Chitipa South previously. Nationally the percentage of women is about 21% with 40 of the 221 MPs being women in 2025. Over a dozen women who were elected as independent women MPs - the others included Madalitso Baloyi, Phoebe Chikaonda, Abigail Shariff and Ireen Mambala.

Moyo spoke in parliament raising a point of order following the new President's speech in November 2025. She noted that on that day only men had been called on to speak that day. 48 out of the 229 seats in the National Assembly were held by women and they deserved equal participation. She lauded that secondary education was now free but wished that it was compulsory as it would help to prevent children being exploited by marriage or labour.
