= Amina Kajiya =

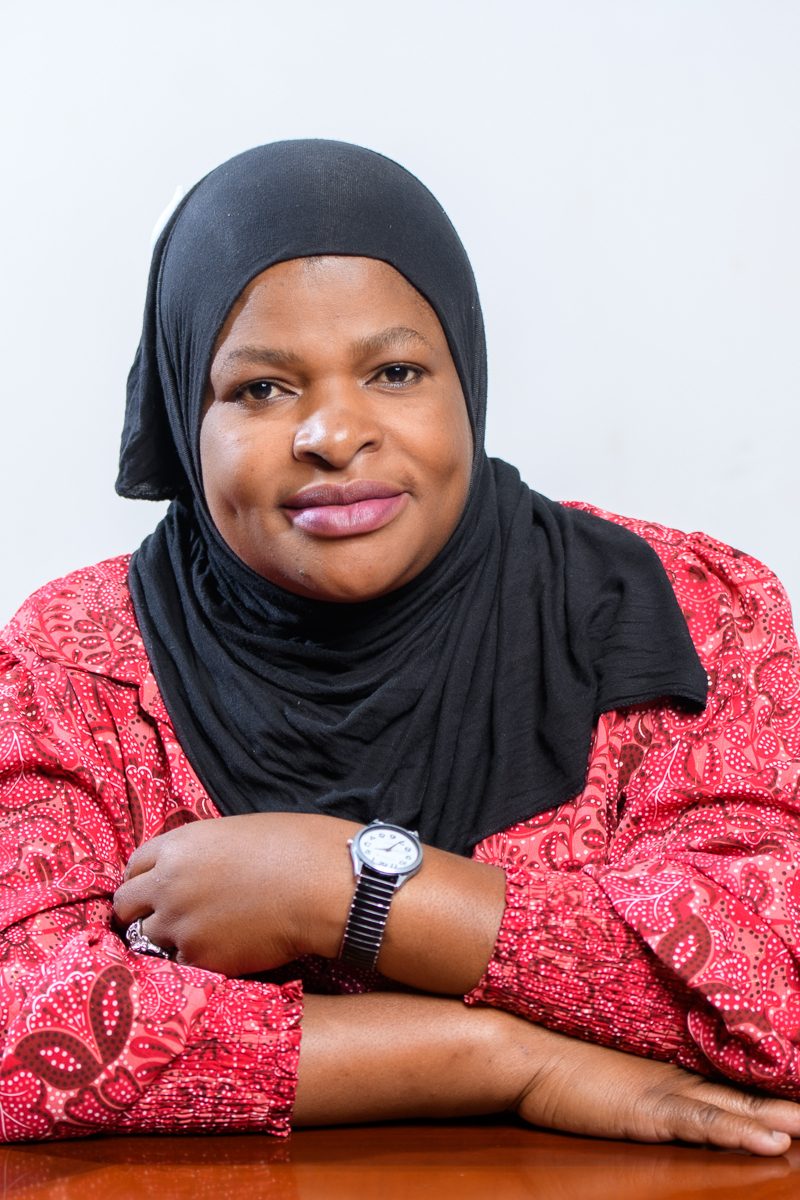
- in 2026
- Occupation: politician
- Known for: MP for Zomba Nsondole Constituency
- Political party: independent => Democratic Progressive Party

Amina Kajiya is a Malawian politician who became the MP for Zomba Nsondole Constituency in 2025.

== Life ==
Kajiya became the MP for Zomba Nsondole Constituency in the 2025 election. She was one of the successful independent women candidates that also included Madalitso Baloyi, Hope Tionge, Rhita Sanga, Khadija Chunga, Phoebe Chikaonda, Abigail Shariff and Ireen Mambala. Following the new President's State of the Nation speech in November 2025, she was reported to be an enthusiastic supporter of Mutharika's policies.

Kajiya is a member of the Public Accounts Committee which alsio includes Susan Dossi, Patricia Kaliati and Ireen Mambala. That committee conducted a Special Public Inquiry into the Purchase of the Amaryllis Hotel by the Public Service Pension Trust Fund. Their report which was published in March 2026, found numerous failings and that the sale broke the "fundamental principles that govern the management of public pension asset".

In 2026 she was one of 13 MPs who switched their allegiance to the Democratic Progressive Party. It was announced by the Speaker in parliament in April 2026.
