= Languages of Malawi =

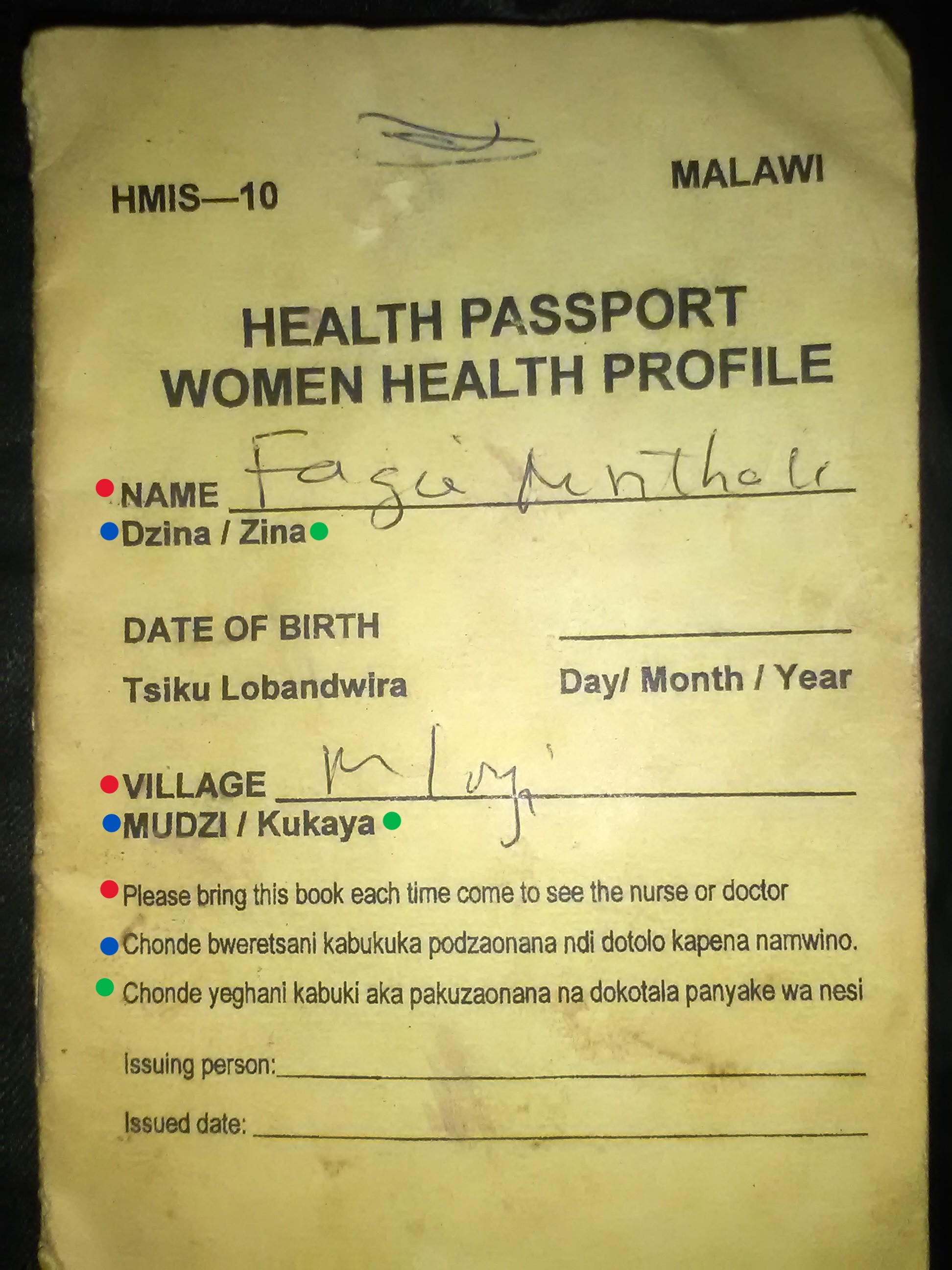
- A national health passport for women written in Chichewa, English and Chitumbuka
- Official: English
- Main: Chichewa, Chitumbuka
- Vernacular: Malawian English
- Minority: Lomwe, Yao, Sena, Lambya, Ngonde, Sukwa
- Signed: Malawian Sign Language
- Keyboard layout: QWERTY

Malawi, a country located in Southeastern Africa, is home to a diverse population with rich linguistic heritage. The current only official language of the country is English, while Chichewa and Chitumbuka are the most widely spoken languages, and were official languages of Malawi until 1968. Other local languages exist and are mostly spoken in specific localities of the country.

There are only six distinct (standalone) languages spoken in Malawi. The total can be 14 but only by adding dialects of those six languages. All of the non foreign languages belong to the Bantu language family. The foreign spoken languages are English, Spanish and French.

== History ==
In the 10th century, Bantu-speaking peoples migrated to the region. The major tribes that came later and settled in the area were the Tumbuka and Chewa peoples who all came from the same area that is currently known as Democratic Republic of the Congo and formerly Zaire.

=== List of main languages ===
- Chichewa
- Chitumbuka
- Yao
- Lomwe
- Sena
- Nyakyusa

There are only 6 distinct languages spoken in Malawi, if removing dialects of those main languages. Mang'anja and Chinyanja are all merged into one to form Chichewa. On the other part, Chitumbuka, Senga, Chiwenya, Chiphoka, Tonga, Yombe and 9 other variants are merged into one to form Chitumbuka. Similarly, Ngonde and Nyakyusa are merged into one to form Nyakyusa-Ngonde language. In return, Ndali, Sukwa and Lambya form Chilambya.

=== Official languages ===
In the late 19th Century, Malawi, then Nyasaland, was colonized by Britain and they introduced English. English, Chitumbuka and Chichewa (then Chinyanja) became the official languages of the country and were used in government, education, and commerce. The two local languages, Chichewa and Chitumbuka, were adopted as official languages in 1942 and they were used in schools, government, national radio and public. Chichewa was used as the language of instruction in primary schools in the Central and Southern Region, whereas Chitumbuka was used as the language of instruction in schools of the Northern and Central Region respectively.

English remained the official language after independence in 1964 along with Chichewa (then Chinyanja) and Chitumbuka. But in 1968 during the reign of Kamuzu Banda, Malawi's first president, changes were made to the language policy of the country. Chichewa and Chitumbuka were removed as official languages of the country, leaving English alone on the official level in 1968. From then, the government of Malawi has never explicitly declared Chichewa or Chitumbuka as official or national languages, neither does the constitution of Malawi say so, but rather lists them as common languages.

== Regions and languages spoken ==
Malawi is divided into three regions: Northern, Central, and Southern.

=== Northern Region ===
==== Chitumbuka ====
In the Northern Region of Malawi, Chitumbuka is the lingua franca of the entire region and is spoken in all districts such as Rumphi, Mzimba, Karonga, Chitipa, Nkhata-Bay and Likoma. It is understood by 99.9% of the entire population of the region. Chitumbuka is also spoken in the Central Region of Malawi in 4 districts, including Kasungu, Nkhotakota and Dowa.

Chitumbuka is used by several ethnic groups in Malawi as their first and second language such as the Henga, Senga, Tumbuka, Tonga, Ngonde, Sukwa and Ngoni people of the Northern Region.

==== Other languages ====
Other languages spoken in the Northern Region are Nkhonde which is heavily influenced by Chitumbuka, Lambya, Ndali and Sukwa. Ndali, Sukwa, Nyakyusa and Lambya are mainly languages of Tanzania and are spoken in the Northern Malawi in a single district in about few villages that share boundary with Tanzania. The Tonga of Malawi is the dialect of Chitumbuka, and is part of the Chitumbuka language family.

== Central Region ==
=== Chichewa ===
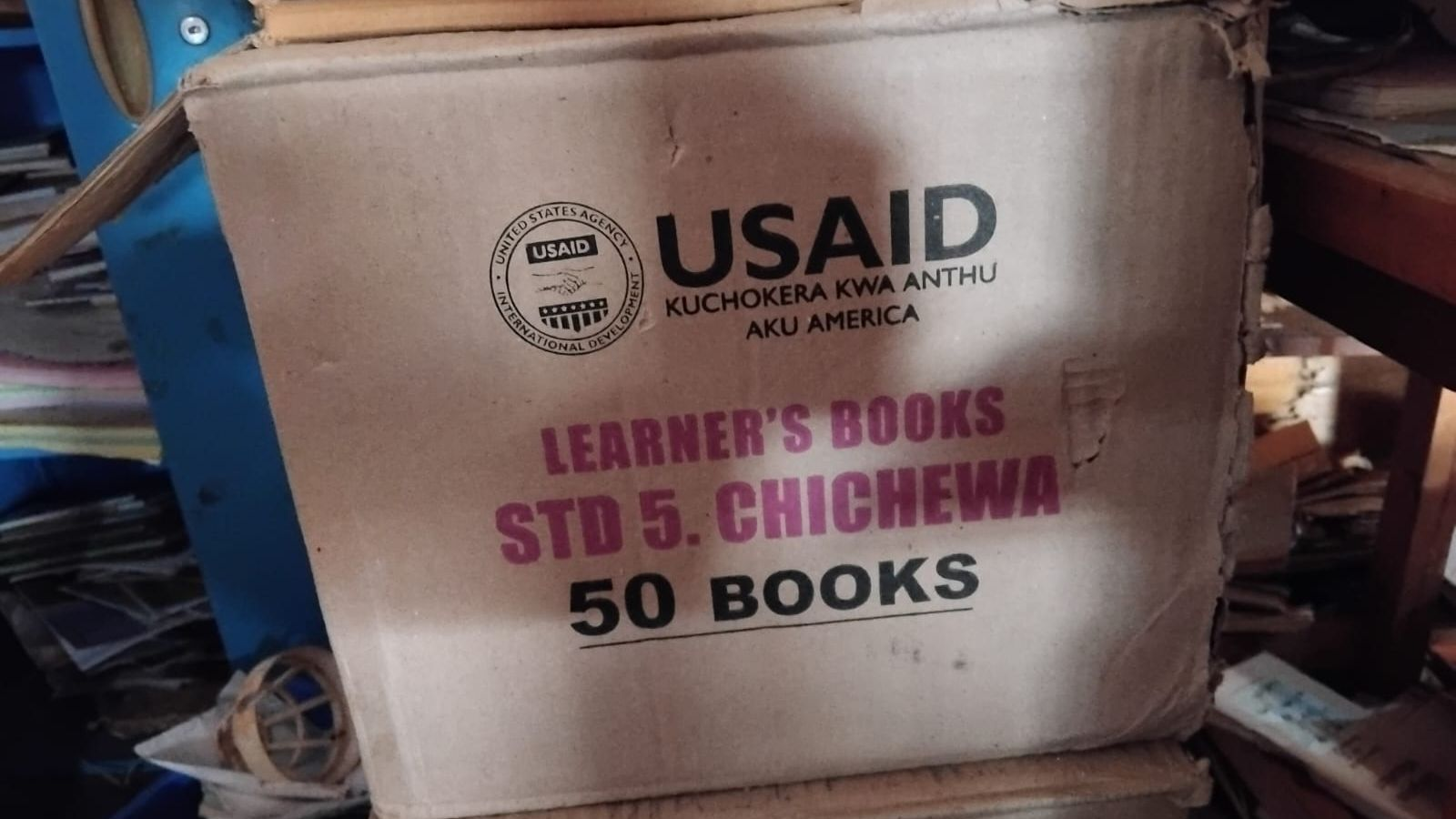
USAID-supplied textbooks in Chichewa

Chichewa is the most common language in the Central Region. It is understood by 97% of the population of the region. Other languages spoken in the region include Chitumbuka (in the districts of Kasungu, Nkhotakota and Ntchisi), Lomwe (mainly in Lilongwe and Dowa), Yao and Sena. Chichewa is also spoken in Southern Region of the country but the number of Chewas in the region is very low, as it is surpassed by other ethnic groups. The other languages spoken in the Central Region are Sena and Yao.

Chichewa was originally called Chinyanja, until Banda changed the name soon after independence. Banda favoured Chichewa but removed it as official language along with Chitumbuka. He disregarded all other local languages of Malawi at the expense of promoting one language. He banned all languages of Malawi and burned all Chitumbuka curriculum books that were being taught in schools. Speaking any other languages including Chitumbuka was a crime in Nyasaland and Banda was criticized by many African leaders and kings around the world for such acts. When Bakili Muluzi took back the country in 1994 from Banda, the language policy was reversed and local languages were restored. However, the government of Malawi is still impartial as it has limited programs in other local languages of Malawi on its national radio and TV instead of promoting all or major languages.

=== Southern Region ===
==== Yao ====
In the Southern Region, Yao, Lomwe, Sena and Chichewa are widely spoken languages. Chitumbuka is the major minor language spoken in the Southern Region while Nkhonde and Lambya are spoken to a lesser extent. Yao, Lomwe and Sena are mainly the languages of Mozambique. The Malawi Lomwe is a dialect of Makhuwa language of Mozambique.

== Malawian English ==
English, the former colonial language, serves as a common language among educated Malawians. English is the first language of only 1% of Malawians. English is used in all regions of Malawi usually in government communication and in urban areas by educated people.

== Percentage distribution of major language groups ==
	Chichewa	Chitumbuka	Yao	English	Other
1980	40.6%	37.4%	10.1%	1.0%	11.0%
2024	48.9%	39.1%	5.1%	1.0%	5.0%

== Language use and policy ==
Today, the language policy of Malawi promotes the use of English as official language, with Chichewa and Chitumbuka being the common languages of the public, media, and education. Other local languages are used in various domains, including cultural events. The constitution of Malawi does not list Chichewa, Chitumbuka or any other Malawian local language as official or national, other than English, but considers Chichewa and Chitumbuka as common languages.

== Media use and online presence ==
=== Music ===
Most Malawian musicians sing in both Chichewa and Chitumbuka, along with English, for wider audience and to make sure the message reaches the whole country even in the north and other parts where Chichewa is not common.

==== Television and film ====
Most Malawian television programs are broadcast in Chichewa, and some in Chitumbuka.

In 2025, the country produced the highest-grossing film of all the time in the country titled Welcome to Maula Prison. The film features two major languages of Malawi, Chichewa and Chitumbuka. This makes the two languages as the first and only languages to have been used in a commercial success film countrywide.

=== Newspapers and online ===
Most Malawian newspapers are written in English, with some in Chichewa and Chitumbuka, such as Fuko Newspapers. In 1960s, the government of Malawi usually wrote its journals and reports in Chichewa and Chitumbuka. The government publications were called "Boma Lathu" in Chichewa, and, "Boma Lithu" in Chitumbuka to mean "Our government".

=== Online presence ===
As of 2025, Chichewa and Chitumbuka are the only Malawian languages to be used online by news websites and forums. There are also active online encyclopedias called Wikipedias in Chichewa and Chitumbuka languages that started in 2003 and 2004. This makes Chichewa and Chitumbuka the only two Malawian languages to have been used for an online encyclopedia.

In 2016 through 2024, Google added Chichewa and Chitumbuka on its Google Translate app and these make the first and only Malawian languages to be available and supported by Google.

==== Digital presence ====
As of 2026, Chichewa and Chitumbuka are the only indigenous Malawian languages documented as being available as user-interface languages on Malawian online commercial platforms and digital services. Other indigenous languages remain largely absent from locally developed online services.

== Criticism ==
Since the government of Malawi had only been promoting English, Chichewa and Chitumbuka in which most literature is written, books and novels in other languages had never been published. Thus, no one can talk about a novel in Chiyao, Lomwe, Malawi Sena, Tonga or Mang'anja, nor had ever heard about it. The government of Malawi had also been greatly criticized for supporting and favouring Chichewa on the expense of other languages.

Various campaigns had been taking place in main towns and notable cities in the past few years but the government of Malawi does not do anything. Some scholars have cited fears of cultural deaths since some children grow without knowing about their own culture as they learn in language that is not theirs.
