= Naomi Kilekwa =

Malawian politician

- Born: 1984 (age 41–42)
- Occupation: politician

Naomi Kilekwa Phiri (born 5 October 1984) is a Malawian politician. She is a member of Malawi Parliamentary Women's Caucus and she serves at the National Assembly of Malawi representing Mulanje South East.

== Life ==
Kilekwa is a member of the National Assembly of Malawi for Mulanje South East. Her term began on 20 May 2014. She is a member of Malawi Parliamentary Women's Caucus and she has sat on the Agriculture and Irrigation Committee.

In 2016 she donated money to support bee-keeping in her constituency. She wanted to support the environment and in particular trees. 71 bee hives were donated in Mbozi for the use of ten bee keeping clubs.

Kilekwa was elected again in 2019 when no party had a majority and the hung parliament may have led to slow decisions. The Democratic Progressive Party President Peter Mutharika appealled to independents to support the government. 32 agreed including Lyana Lexa Tambala, Susan Dossi, Roseby Gadama and Nancy Chaola Mdooko. Another report mentioned 19 MPs including Kilekwa Phiri and Mary Khembo.

On 2023 Kilekwa was suspended from parliament by the speaker Catherine Gotani Hara after unruly behaviour during President Lazarus Chakwera's state of the union address. She had refused to leave and Mary Navicha, Thoko Tembo and Victoria Kingstone supported her. Her supporters were suspended as well.

In August 2024 she used money from her constituency development fund to buy 270 bags of fertiliser. Some of her constituents were hungry following four years of poor harvests and the damage by Cyclone Freddy. The fertiliser was for irrigation farming and to permit self reliance and it was targeted at 17 groups of 50 to 100 people.
