= Mchinji District =

District of Malawi

Coordinates: 13°45′S 33°05′E

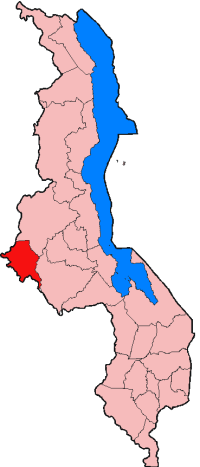
Location of Mchinji District in Malawi

Mchinji is a district in the Central Region of Malawi. The capital is Mchinji. The district covers an area of 3,356 km^{2} (1,296 sq mi) and has a population of 602,305. The area's economy is sustained by rain-fed agriculture.

== Demographics ==
At the time of the 2018 Census of Malawi, the distribution of the population of Mchinji District by ethnic group was as follows:

- 89.2% Chewa
- 6.2% Ngoni
- 2.1% Yao
- 1.1% Lomwe
- 0.6% Tumbuka
- 0.1% Sena
- 0.1% Mang'anja
- 0.1% Tonga
- 0.1% Nkhonde
- 0.0% Nyanja
- 0.0% Lambya
- 0.0% Sukwa
- 0.3% Others

== Government and administrative divisions ==
There are six National Assembly constituencies in Mchinji:

- Mchinji - East
- Mchinji - North
- Mchinji - North East
- Mchinji - South
- Mchinji - South West
- Mchinji - West

In the 2009 election all of these constituencies were held by members of the Malawi Congress Party.

In 2025 the Mchinji West Constituency was won by Rhita Sanga.
