= Nyakyusa =

Nyakyusa may refer to:

- Nyakyusa people, of Tanzania and Malawi
- Nyakyusa language, their Bantu language
