= Ndali =

Ndali may refer to:

- Ndali people, a people of Tanzania and Malawi
- Ndali language
- Ndali, Benin, a town in Benin
