= Phoebe Chikaonda =

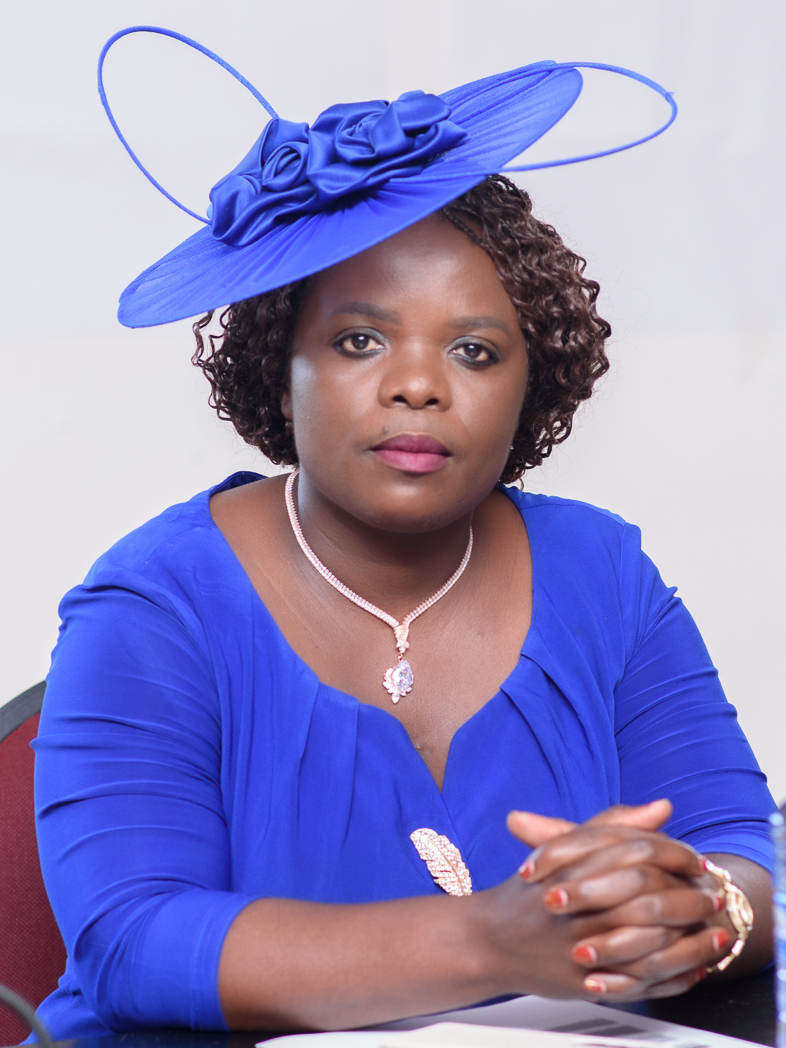
- in 2026
- Occupation: politician

Phoebe Chiku Chikaonda is a Malawian politician who became the MP for Ntchisi East in the 2025 election.

== Political career ==
In 2018, Chikaonda contested for the Ntchisi East seat as a United Democratic Front candidate, finishing last with 6% of the 17,000 votes behind winner William Kalima of the Malawi Congress Party (MCP), who secured over 40%.

Supported by the Gender Coordination Network as a prospective candidate for the 2025 election, she ran again and won the Ntchisi East Constituency by defeating five opponents, marking the first time the constituency elected a female member of parliament. Her victory contributed to a modest increase in women's representation in parliament in 2025, alongside other successful independent women candidates including Madalitso Baloyi, Hope Tionge, Rhita Sanga, Khadija Chunga, Amina Kajiya, Abigail Shariff, and Ireen Mambala.

In 2026, Chikaonda had joined the Democratic Progressive Party (DPP), the country's largest and governing party.
