= Dances of the Nyakyusa =

The major traditional dances of Nyakyusa people are Ing'oma, Magosi, Samba, Mwambulo and Ipenenga. The categories are based on the age group of people who participate in dancing. Dances takes place during harvesting periods but also sometime may take place during burial ceremony of the village member. The dances are popular in all districts covered by nyakyusa people i.e. Rungwe, Busokelo and Kyela in Mbeya Region, Tanzania. The same culture is found in northern part of Malawi.

== Ing'oma ==
Ing'oma dances is the most popular traditional dances in the Nyakyusa community. Ing'oma resembles numerous eastern and central African dances such as mganda of people from Ruvuma region in Tanzania and malipenga in Malawi. Performers bear titles that derive from English language military terms, such as commander, corporal, and major; The uniforms appears to be derived from a European military prototype. Thousands of People flocks to see ing'oma dances competitions in the dry season when host associations invites guest associations to dance in specially prepared clearings. Normally associations are based on village wise.

== Magosi and Samba ==
Samba and magosi are performed by youths, The difference between the two is just the number of dancers. Samba can exceed three while magosi consists of maximum of three performers at a time. The dancers are mostly below the age of 25 years.

== Mwambulo and Ipenenga ==
The two dances goes together and performed by men aged between 25 years to 40 years. They are normally performed during times with high production of rice. It is a symbol of victory where people celebrate the production of crops being enormous.
