= Jacquiline Chikuta =

Malawian politician (1958–2021)

Member of Parliament for Ntchisi North
- In office 2019 – 27 January 2021

Personal details
- Born: July 21, 1958 Nyasaland, Federation of Rhodesia and Nyasaland
- Died: January 27, 2021 (aged 62) Mponela, Dowa District, Malawi
- Party: Malawi Congress Party
- Occupation: Politician

Jacquiline Chikuta (21 July 1958 – 27 January 2021) was a Malawian politician. She was elected in 2019 and served until her early death.

== Life ==
Chikuta was born on 21 July 1958, in Nyasaland.

She became an MP in 2019 for Ntchisi, North and she was vice-chairperson for the Parliamentary Committee on Education. She was a member of the Malawi Congress Party and the Malawi Parliamentary Women's Caucus. She sat on the Public Appointments Committee with Anna Katchiko and Rachel Mazombwe.

She died in Mtengowanthenga Hospital in Mponelaa in Dowa District of COVID-19 on 27 January 2021, aged 62. She was one of two MPs who had died of COVID-19 that month. She was buried in her constituency the next day. Wezzie Gondwe died in September 2021. She was the third MP to die that year. Bi-elections were held for the three constituencies on 26 October 2021.
