= Balaka District =

District of Malawi

Coordinates: 15°00′S 35°00′E

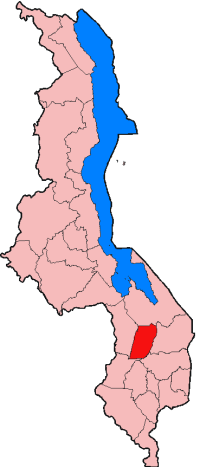
Location of Balaka District in Malawi

Balaka is a district in the Southern Region of Malawi. The capital is Balaka.

== Description ==
The district covers an area of 2,140 km.² and has a population of 438,379. The district's population is increasing at a rate of 2.3% per annum. Major attractions in Balaka District include the 1,850 Ha estate Toleza Agricultural Enterprises, St. Louis Montfort Catholic Church, the Andiamo Vocational Complex and the Chifundo Artisans' Network.

In this district is the town of Nkaya, an important urban center that serves as the junction point of the country's road-rail systems.

A new Khwisa Health Centre was opened by the newly elected Minister of Health and Sanitation Madalitso Baloyi in 2025. It had taken twelve years to build as funding had been stopped after the Cashgate scandal. It was funded by several European governments.

== Demographics ==
At the time of the 2018 Census of Malawi, the distribution of the population of Balaka District by ethnic group was as follows:

- 36.2% Yao
- 25.2% Lomwe
- 14.2% Ngoni
- 10.0% Chewa
- 6.8%Tumbuka
- 3.3% Sena
- 3.1% Mang'anja
- 0.8% Tonga
- 0.1% Nkhonde
- 0.0% Lambya
- 0.0% Sukwa
- 0.4% Others

== Government and administrative divisions ==
There are four National Assembly constituencies in Balaka:

1. Balaka Central East
2. Balaka North
3. Balaka South
4. Balaka West
