= Bertha Mackenzie Ndebele =

Malawian politician

Bertha Ndebele
- Occupation: Politician
- Known for: Member of the National Assembly
- Political party: Democratic Progressive Party

Bertha Mackenzie Ndebele is a Malawian politician elected for Balaka west in southern Malawi in 2019.

== Life ==
Ndebele was first elected for the Balaka west constituency in southern Malawi in May 2019. She was a member of the Democratic Progressive Party and one of 19 women elected from her party. There had been a "50:50" campaign before the election to encourage more support for women into the 192-member parliament. At the election there was 45 women members elected.

In 2020, Ndebele was elected to be the Chair of the Southern African Development Community (SADC) Standing Committee for Human and Social Development and Special Programmes.

Ndebele became a member of the Malawi Parliamentary Women's Caucus and in 2023 she,Roseby Gadama and Olipa Chimangeni met members of the European Parliamentary Forum for Sexual & Reproductive Rights at Kamuzu Central Hospital in Lilongwe where funding and priorities were discussed with the hospital Director Johnthan Ngoma and the deputy director, Mable Chinkhata.

In 2024, parliament discussed sending thousands of people to work in Israel. It was a controversial proposal, because it involved politicians getting involved in business. Joyce Chitsulo who was an MP had led a mission to Israel to oversee the conditions as there were already hundreds of Malawians working there. Chitsulo reported that there were complaints but she believed this was due to high expectations and poor communication. Ndebele noted the high number of unemployed young people in her constituency and she supported the proposal.

At the end of 2024 a video was found of Ndebele talking to her constituents where she bluntly admitted that there was a need for her to support President Chakwera. She argued that with support he could achieve progress - even though her constituents had not voted for him. Her attitude of compromise and cooperation was well received by some commentators.
