= Susan Ndalama =

Malawian politician

Susan Ndalama is a Malawian politician who serves as member of the Malawian Parliament for Blantyre Rural East. Ndalama's term began on 20 May 2014.

Ndalama was born in Blantyre. She joined the Malawi Parliamentary Women's Caucus and became an executive member and deputy chair. The caucus was led by Roseby Gadama.

In 2018 she gave her strong support to the existing President Peter Mutharika calling for him to be elected again. She had a rural constituency but it was beginning to look urban. An example of this was the Mlonbozi Bridge which was replaced after it was destroyed by floods.
