= Olipa Chimangeni =

Malawian politician

- Occupation: Malawian politician
- Political party: Malawi Congress Party

Olipa Chimangeni is a Malawian politician and a member of the Malawi Congress Party. She gained two children and an HIV diagnosis from a failed marriage. served as a spokesperson for World Vision International and she became member of the Malawian parliament for Ntchisi North East from May 2014.

== Life ==
Chimangeni was born to subsistence farmers. She was obliged as a teenager to marry a man who had made her pregnant with his abuse. She and her son left him and she found herself alone in central Malawi as her parents could not afford to feed two extra mouths. After five years away her husband returned but the recovered relationship left her with another child and she and her second child, Miriam, both had an HIV diagnosis. Her parents gained some support and she returned to their home.

Ignoring common practice she decided to speak about her diagnosis. She joined groups that previously had not had HIV-positive members and she taught herself English. She started a support group and she became a spokesperson for World Vision. In May 2014 she was elected to parliament and in 2016 she went on a speaking tour in New Zealand.

Chimangeni was re-elected in 2019 where she was one of 45 women elected to a parliament with 193 seats. There had been a campaign to get 50% but this was unsuccessful.

Chimangeni became a member of the Malawi Parliamentary Women's Caucus and in 2023 she, Roseby Gadama and Bertha Ndebele met members of the European Parliamentary Forum for Sexual & Reproductive Rights at Kamuzu Central Hospital in Lilongwe where funding and priorities were discussed with the hospital Director Johnthan Ngoma and the Deputy Director, Mable Chinkhata.

She was elected for the third time in 2025 citing her compulsion to serve. Chimangeni said she spent 30m kwacha during the campaign in the Central Region constituency of Ntchisi Central East.
