= Nancy Chaola Mdooko =

Malawian politician and minister

Deputy Minister of Education of Malawi
- In office January 31, 2023 – 2025
- President: Lazarus Chakwera

Personal details
- Born: Malawi
- Party: United Transformation Movement (UTM)

Nancy Chaola Mdooko is a Malawian politician and educator. She became a Deputy Minister of Education in 2023. She lost her seat in the 2025 Malawian general election.

== Life ==
She was elected to represent Ntcheu Bwanje North. The 2019 parliament had no party with a majority and the hung parliament may have led to slow decisions. The Democratic Progressive Party President Peter Mutharika appealled to independents like Chaola Mdooko to support the government. 32 agreed including Chaola Mdooko, Susan Dossi, Lyana Lexa Tambala, Roseby Gadama, and Abigail Shariff.

She became the Deputy Minister of Education in Malawi, when she was appointed in early January 2023 by the president of Malawi Lazarus Chakwera. She is the deputy to Madalitso Wirima Kambauwa who is the education minister.

Her term as deputy minister began on 31 January 2023. In November she addressed a Regional Universities Forum in Cameroon where she dared universities to invest in different ideas. The meeting was about "Capacity Building in Agriculture" and she noted the priorities of feeding the population and improving nutrition.

In 2024 she was at a three-day summer camp for 100 girls that was organised by the Centre for Alternatives for Victimized Women and Children (CAVWOC) and Oxfam at Balaka's secondary school. She and local MP Bertha Ndebele encouraged the girls to build on this opportunity.

She stood in the 2025 Malawian General Election to represent the Ntcheu Bwanje constituency and lost her seat.

Awards and achievements
Preceded by	Deputy Minister of Education of Malawi	Succeeded by
