= Balaka West Constituency =

Malawian electoral constituency

- First-past-the-post constituency for the Parliament of Malawi
- District: Balaka
- Region: Southern Region

Current constituency
- Party: DPP
- Member(s): Nasrin Pillane

Balaka West Constituency is a constituency for the National Assembly of Malawi, located in the Balaka District of Malawi's Southern Region. It is one of the 4 constituencies in the district that elects one member of parliament by the first past the post system.

The constituency has several wards, all electing councilors for the Balaka District. In 2019, the member of parliament who represented the constituency was Bertha Mackenzie Ndebele.

== Members of parliament ==
Elections	MP	Party	Notes	References
2009	Nasrin Pillane	DPP	Multi-party system	
2019	Bertha Mackenzie Ndebele	DPP	Multi-party system	
