= Jenipher Deborah Chilunga =

Malawian politician

Minister of Environment and Climate Change Management
- President: Joyce Banda
- Succeeded by: Halima Daud

Deputy Minister of Gender, Children and Social Welfare
- President: Joyce Banda

Jenipher Deborah Chilunga (also reported as Jennifer Chilunga) is a Malawian politician who was the MP for Zomba Nsondole Constituency from 2009 to 2014 and served as a minister under President Joyce Banda.

== Life ==
Chilunga became the MP for Zomba Nsondole Constituency in the 2009 election representing the Democratic Progressive Party. She was thousands of votes ahead of her nearest rival. By February 2012, Chilunga had moved to The People's Party, founded by Joyce Banda, then Vice-President.

In April 2012, President Joyce Banda appointed Chilunga the Deputy Minister for Gender, Children and Social Welfare. In that role, she launched the 2012 National Early Childhood Development Awareness Week.

President Joyce Banda made Chilunga the Minister of Environment and Climate Change Management. In December 2012 Chilunga described the country's annual deforestation rate of 2.8% as worrying at the launch of a tree-planting season in which about 60 million trees were expected to be planted. A Nation feature argued that even planting 60 million trees a year would not break the cycle of deforestation, because population growth and livelihoods such as charcoal-making continued to drive tree-cutting.

In April 2013, during a tour of the Department of Climate Change and Meteorological Services in Blantyre, Chilunga said that people had died in floods because early-warning messages took too long to reach the public, and called for investment in meteorological services, including automatic weather stations.

In 2013 the tenth session of the United Nations Forum on Forests took place in Istanbul. Chilunga was there discussing with other countries how forest management could mitigate climate change and addressed the session on behalf of Malawi.

At the beginning of July 2013 President Joyce Banda rearranged and trimmed her cabinet. Chilunga was one of the casualties. Halima Daud was one of the new appointments and she became Minister of Environment and Climate Change Management. The reshuffle reduced the number of cabinet portfolios from 36 to 32.

In January 2014 Chilunga was reported to have won the People Party's primary election for Zomba Nsondole. In the May 2014 general election, Chilunga finished third of 13 candidates with 3,630 votes, and the seat was won by the independent candidate Aboo Mcnice Naliwa.

In 2024 she was a board member of the Malawi Digital Broadcast Network Ltd.
