= Demographics of Malawi =

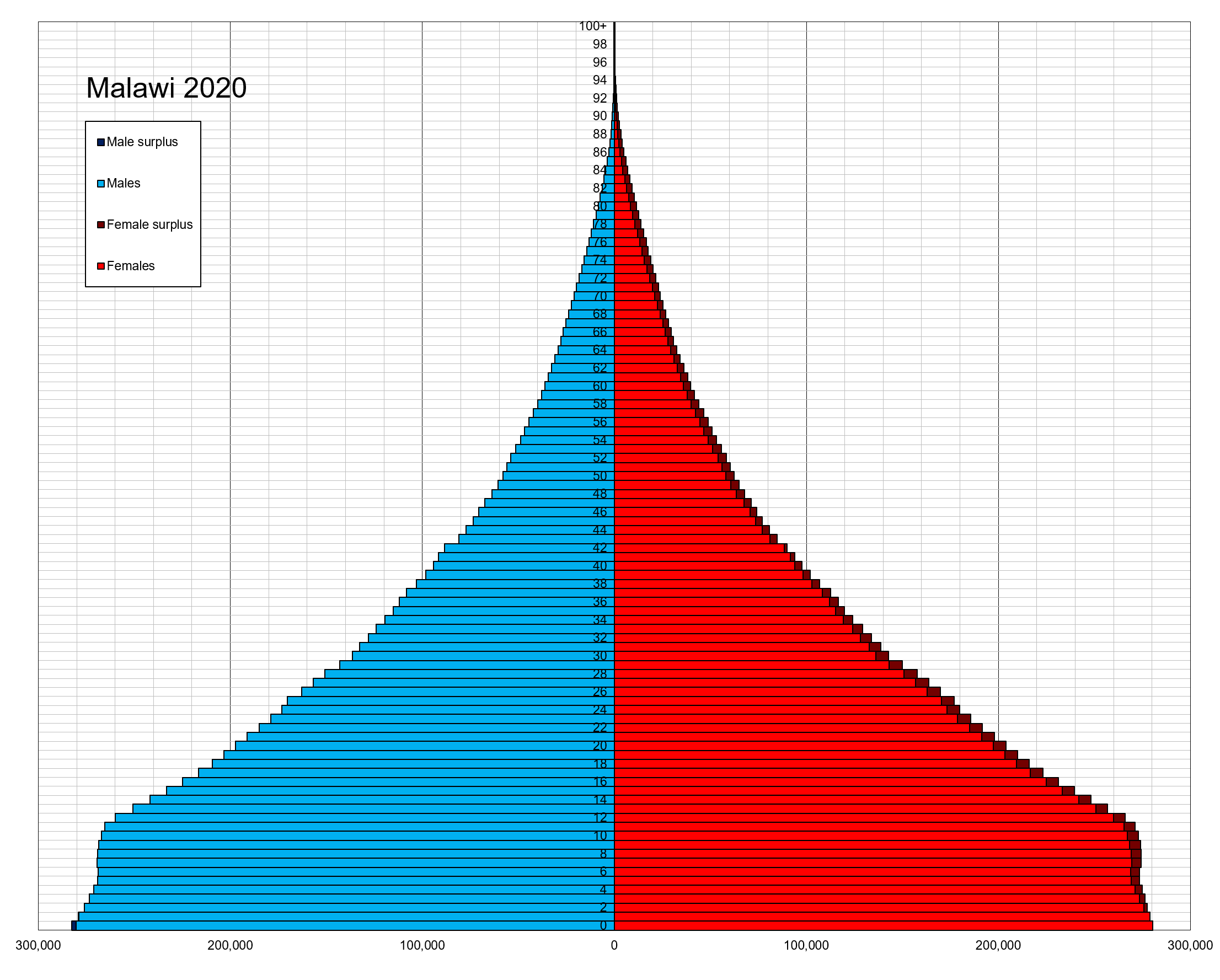
- Population pyramid of Malawi in 2020
- Population: 20,794,353 (2022 est.)
- Growth rate: 2.34% (2022 est.)
- Birth rate: 27.94 births/1,000 population (2022 est.)
- Death rate: 4.58 deaths/1,000 population (2022 est.)
- Life expectancy: 72.44 years
  - male: 69.33 years
  - female: 75.59 years
- Fertility rate: 3.4 children born/woman (2022 est.)
- Infant mortality: 33.43 deaths/1,000 live births
- Net migration rate: 0 migrant(s)/1,000 population (2022 est.)

Age structure
- 0–14 years: 45.87%
- 65 and over: 2.68%

Nationality
- Nationality: Malawian

Language
- Official: English

Demographic features of the population of Malawi include population density, ethnicity, education level, health of the populace, economic status, religious affiliations and other aspects of the population.

== Region distribution ==
=== Northern region ===
The Tumbuka people make up of 94% of the population of the Northern region. Other groups include the Ngonde, Lambya and Sukwa. The predominant and common language in the region is Chitumbuka, which is also spoken in Central Region of Malawi.

The sub branch of Tonga people are part of the Tumbuka people who relocated in their current territories in the early 19th Century when the Nkhamanga Kingdom started to decline.

=== Central region ===
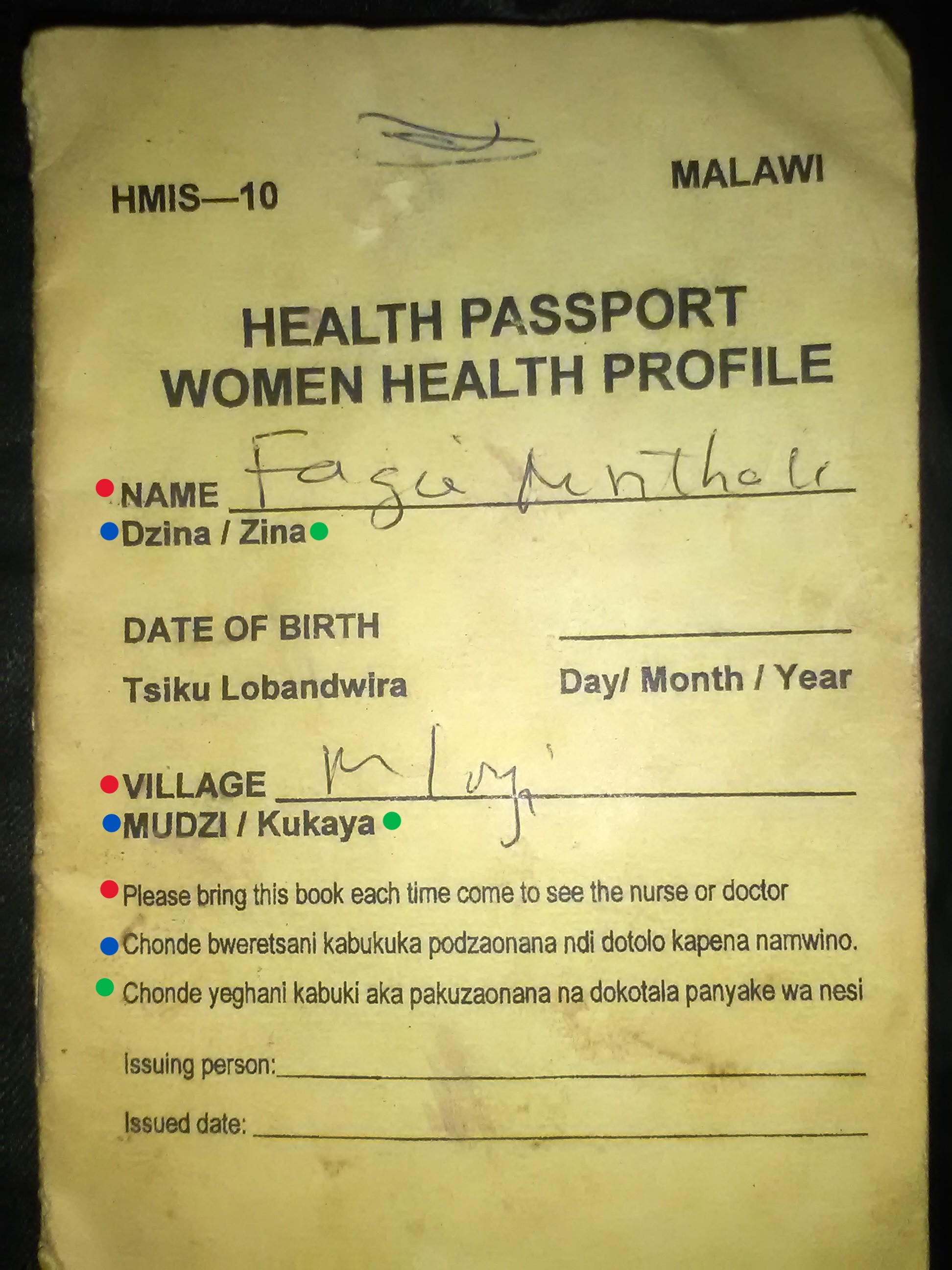
Malawi health passport showing 3 languages most used in Malawi, English (red dot), Chewa (blue dot) and Tumbuka (green dot).

The Chewa ethnic group make up about 65% of the population of the central region. Other ethnic groups found in the region include the Tumbuka and Ngoni, among others. Chichewa is the common language in the region, followed by Chitumbuka in some districts such as Kasungu, Dowa and Nkhotakota.

=== Southern region ===
The Southern region is made up of the Yao and the Lomwe people. They are both the Bantu groups who came from Mozambique due to wars. The common languages in urban areas such as Blantyre are Chichewa, English and Chitumbuka. In rural areas, Lomwe, Sena and Yao are used, primarily by elder people.

== Population ==
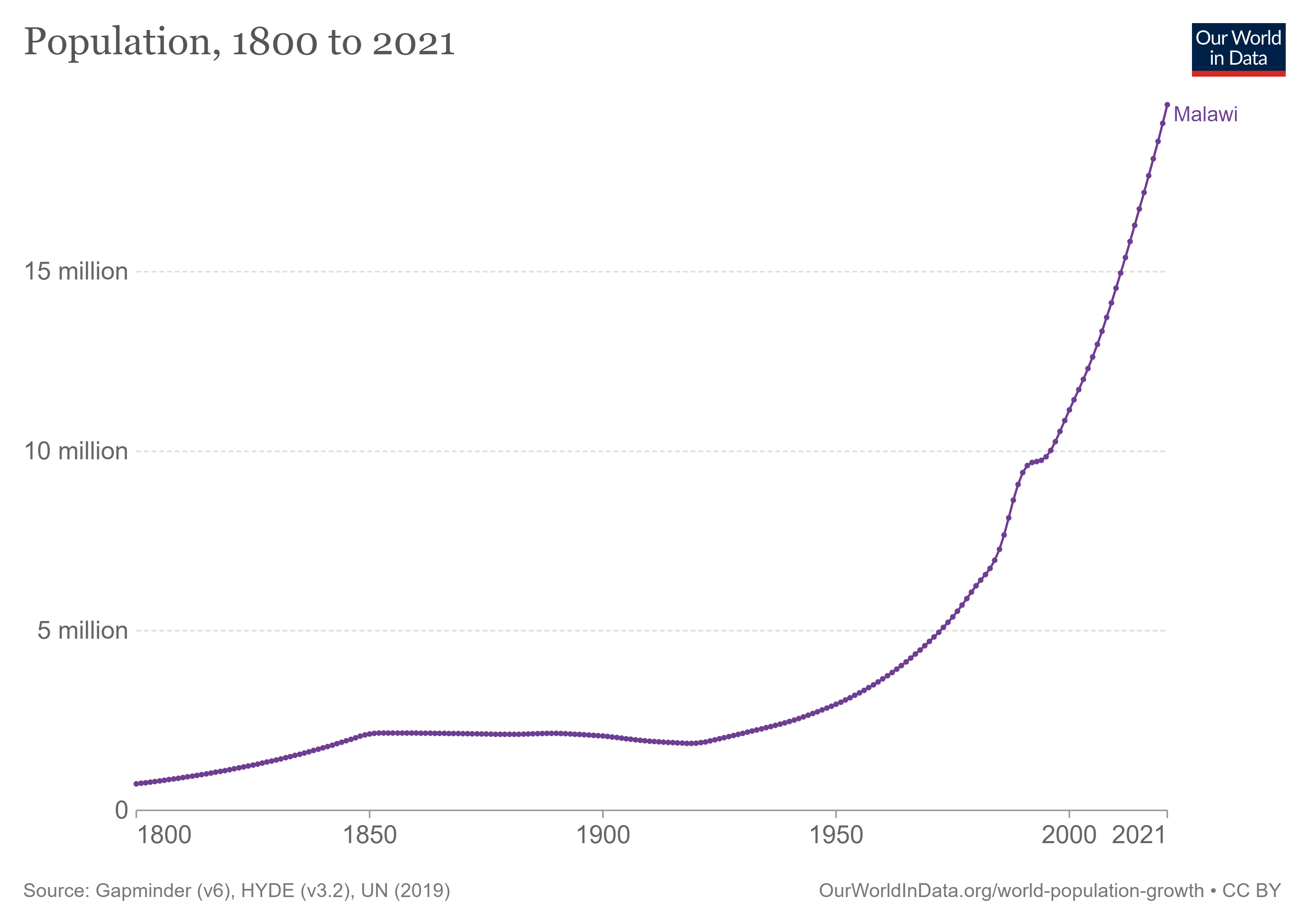
Demographics of Malawi, Data of Our World in Data, year 2022; Number of inhabitants in millions.

Population, fertility rate and net reproduction rate, United Nations estimates

Year	Total population ( × 1000)	Population percentage		
Year	Total population ( × 1000)	aged 0–14	aged 15–64	aged 65+
1950	2 881	45.7	51.2	3.1
1955	3 166	45.7	51.5	2.8
1960	3 525	45.9	51.6	2.6
1965	3 975	45.3	52.3	2.4
1970	4 531	46.3	51.4	2.3
1975	5 302	46.9	50.6	2.5
1980	6 240	47.1	50.3	2.6
1985	7 268	47.5	50.0	2.5
1990	9 381	45.9	51.4	2.7
1995	9 883	44.7	52.2	3.1
2000	11 229	45.8	51.1	3.1
2005	12 823	46.1	50.9	3.1
2010	14 901	45.8	51.1	3.1

Total and percent distribution of population by single year of age (Census 09.03.2018)

Age	Population	Percent
Total	17,563,749	100
0–4	2,552,406	14.53
0	522,802	2.98
1	509,351	2.90
2	490,811	2.79
3	511,365	2.91
4	518,077	2.95
5–9	2,632,878	14.99
5	529,111	3.01
6	546,708	3.11
7	526,347	3.00
8	532,846	3.03
9	497,866	2.83
10–14	2,533,303	14.42
10	539,264	3.07
11	489,887	2.79
12	517,832	2.95
13	492,122	2.80
14	494,198	2.81
15–19	2,035,945	11.59
15	452,017	2.57
16	339,248	1.93
17	384,682	2.19
18	497,831	2.83
19	362,167	2.06
20–24	1,651,576	9.40
20	357,667	2.04
21	323,511	1.84
22	304,519	1.73
23	330,222	1.88
24	335,657	1.91
25–29	1,229,411	7.00
25	291,198	1.66
26	274,739	1.56
27	213,337	1.21
28	238,630	1.36
29	211,507	1.20
30–34	1,107,226	6.30
30	243,969	1.39
31	209,155	1.19
32	226,360	1.29
33	218,620	1.24
34	209,122	1.19
35–39	968,998	5.52
35	221,078	1.26
36	207,499	1.18
37	165,564	0.94
38	210,252	1.20
39	164,605	0.94
40–44	729,600	4.15
40	168,637	0.96
41	137,967	0.79
42	147,438	0.84
43	151,363	0.86
44	124,195	0.71
45–49	535,868	3.05
45	129,172	0.74
46	121,996	0.69
47	89,576	0.51
48	112,116	0.64
49	83,008	0.47
50–54	387,812	2.21
50	99,632	0.57
51	57,309	0.33
52	63,690	0.36
53	72,671	0.41
54	94,510	0.54
55–59	306,921	1.75
55	69,274	0.39
56	63,914	0.36
57	50,534	0.29
58	75,091	0.43
59	48,108	0.27
60–64	234,918	1.34
60	69,006	0.39
61	38,753	0.22
62	44,264	0.25
63	40,119	0.23
64	42,776	0.24
65–69	240,551	1.37
65	47,861	0.27
66	50,078	0.29
67	35,456	0.20
68	59,659	0.34
69	47,497	0.27
70–74	144,788	0.82
70	39,380	0.22
71	27,618	0.16
72	26,622	0.15
73	31,656	0.18
74	19,512	0.11
75–79	124,718	0.71
75	25,635	0.15
76	28,492	0.16
77	19,096	0.11
78	35,174	0.20
79	16,321	0.09
80–84	63,675	0.36
80	16,846	0.10
81	9,987	0.06
82	12,908	0.07
83	14,208	0.08
84	9,726	0.06
85–89	54,754	0.31
85	12,054	0.07
86	14,628	0.08
87	8,331	0.05
88	15,327	0.09
89	4,414	0.03
90–94	15,130	0.09
90	5,041	0.03
91	2,466	0.01
92	2,746	0.02
93	2,897	0.02
94	1,980	0.01
95+	13,271	0.08

Age group	Population	Percent
0-14	7,718,587	43.95
15–64	9,188,275	52.31
65+	656,887	3.74

=== UN population projections ===
Numbers are in thousands. UN medium variant projections

- 2015 17,522
- 2020 20,677
- 2025 24,212
- 2030 28,173
- 2035 32,667
- 2040 37,797
- 2045 43,521
- 2050 49,719

== Vital statistics ==
=== United Nations estimates ===
Registration of vital events is in Malawi not complete. The website Our World in Data prepared the following estimates based on statistics from the Population Department of the United Nations.

	Mid-year population (thousands)	Live births (thousands)	Deaths (thousands)	Natural change (thousands)	Crude birth rate (per 1000)	Crude death rate (per 1000)	Natural change (per 1000)	Total fertility rate (TFR)	Infant mortality (per 1000 live births)	Life expectancy (in years)
1950	2,950,000	145,000	96,000	49,000	49.2	32.5	16.7	6.80	206.1	32.75
1951	3,001,000	149,000	96,000	53,000	49.6	31.8	17.8	6.81	205.8	32.81
1952	3,056,000	153,000	96,000	57,000	50.1	31.4	18.6	6.83	204.9	32.91
1953	3,115,000	157,000	97,000	60,000	50.5	31.2	19.4	6.85	203.9	33.10
1954	3,176,000	160,000	98,000	62,000	50.4	30.8	19.5	6.79	202.9	33.40
1955	3,240,000	165,000	99,000	66,000	50.9	30.5	20.5	6.83	201.8	33.79
1956	3,309,000	170,000	100,000	70,000	51.4	30.2	21.3	6.87	200.5	34.22
1957	3,381,000	176,000	101,000	74,000	52.0	30.0	22.0	6.91	199.3	34.52
1958	3,457,000	181,000	103,000	78,000	52.4	29.9	22.6	6.95	197.9	34.80
1959	3,537,000	187,000	105,000	82,000	53.0	29.8	23.2	7.00	196.5	35.02
1960	3,621,000	193,000	108,000	85,000	53.3	29.7	23.5	7.03	195.2	35.20
1961	3,708,000	199,000	110,000	89,000	53.7	29.7	24.0	7.07	193.8	35.33
1962	3,799,000	205,000	112,000	93,000	54.0	29.5	24.5	7.10	192.6	35.65
1963	3,894,000	212,000	116,000	96,000	54.3	29.7	24.6	7.13	191.8	35.62
1964	3,990,000	216,000	118,000	98,000	54.1	29.6	24.4	7.10	191.1	35.69
1965	4,089,000	221,000	121,000	100,000	54.1	29.6	24.4	7.11	190.7	35.72
1966	4,191,000	227,000	124,000	103,000	54.2	29.5	24.7	7.16	190.1	35.87
1967	4,296,000	233,000	127,000	107,000	54.3	29.5	24.8	7.22	189.4	35.90
1968	4,403,000	239,000	129,000	110,000	54.3	29.4	25.0	7.28	188.6	36.04
1969	4,513,000	244,000	131,000	113,000	54.1	29.1	25.0	7.29	187.7	36.32
1970	4,625,000	249,000	133,000	117,000	53.9	28.7	25.2	7.32	186.2	36.73
1971	4,742,000	254,000	133,000	121,000	53.6	28.1	25.5	7.33	183.8	37.24
1972	4,866,000	260,000	134,000	127,000	53.5	27.4	26.0	7.35	180.6	37.90
1973	4,996,000	266,000	134,000	132,000	53.2	26.8	26.5	7.36	176.8	38.54
1974	5,134,000	272,000	134,000	138,000	53.0	26.0	26.9	7.37	172.9	39.27
1975	5,281,000	279,000	133,000	146,000	52.9	25.2	27.7	7.40	168.6	40.22
1976	5,438,000	287,000	132,000	155,000	52.8	24.3	28.5	7.43	164.3	41.23
1977	5,612,000	296,000	131,000	164,000	52.7	23.4	29.3	7.46	159.7	42.23
1978	5,809,000	305,000	131,000	174,000	52.6	22.6	30.1	7.48	154.9	43.29
1979	6,029,000	315,000	132,000	184,000	52.5	21.9	30.6	7.51	149.8	44.27
1980	6,267,000	329,000	134,000	195,000	52.6	21.4	31.2	7.57	145.7	45.09
1981	6,520,000	339,000	137,000	203,000	52.3	21.0	31.3	7.54	142.1	45.70
1982	6,784,000	351,000	141,000	210,000	51.9	20.9	31.1	7.51	140.1	45.99
1983	7,058,000	361,000	147,000	214,000	51.3	20.9	30.4	7.44	140.0	46.04
1984	7,339,000	370,000	155,000	215,000	50.7	21.2	29.4	7.36	141.6	45.58
1985	7,625,000	382,000	164,000	218,000	50.3	21.7	28.7	7.29	143.7	44.95
1986	7,910,000	393,000	174,000	220,000	49.9	22.0	27.9	7.22	145.2	44.34
1987	8,296,000	404,000	182,000	222,000	49.5	22.3	27.2	7.15	145.5	43.81
1988	8,755,000	423,000	198,000	225,000	48.9	22.9	26.0	7.02	144.6	43.38
1989	9,175,000	439,000	204,000	234,000	48.3	22.5	25.8	6.91	142.6	43.34
1990	9,540,000	454,000	210,000	244,000	47.8	22.1	25.7	6.81	139.9	43.32
1991	9,832,000	467,000	213,000	253,000	47.5	21.7	25.8	6.72	136.5	43.31
1992	10,115,000	477,000	215,000	262,000	47.2	21.3	25.9	6.65	132.4	43.41
1993	10,257,000	488,000	219,000	269,000	46.9	21.0	25.9	6.59	128.9	43.39
1994	10,132,000	484,000	214,000	270,000	46.6	20.6	26.0	6.51	125.4	43.56
1995	10,113,000	470,000	206,000	264,000	46.3	20.3	26.0	6.42	122.4	43.64
1996	10,311,000	476,000	212,000	264,000	46.0	20.5	25.5	6.31	120.0	43.44
1997	10,513,000	486,000	218,000	268,000	46.1	20.7	25.4	6.26	117.6	43.13
1998	10,732,000	497,000	224,000	273,000	46.2	20.8	25.4	6.24	114.6	42.85
1999	10,974,000	506,000	222,000	284,000	46.0	20.2	25.8	6.15	110.7	43.57
2000	11,229,000	510,000	220,000	290,000	45.4	19.6	25.8	6.04	105.2	44.52
2001	11,499,000	520,000	214,000	306,000	45.2	18.6	26.6	5.99	98.1	45.90
2002	11,784,000	532,000	208,000	324,000	45.1	17.7	27.4	5.96	90.9	47.22
2003	12,088,000	546,000	201,000	345,000	45.1	16.6	28.5	5.94	83.1	48.79
2004	12,411,000	559,000	193,000	366,000	45.0	15.5	29.4	5.93	76.7	50.45
2005	12,756,000	573,000	187,000	387,000	44.0	14.3	29.7	5.85	71.7	52.04
2006	13,118,000	583,000	183,000	400,000	43.8	13.7	30.1	5.80	68.2	53.24
2007	13,495,000	589,000	182,000	407,000	43.3	13.1	30.2	5.72	65.8	53.95
2008	13,889,000	593,000	180,000	413,000	42.6	12.4	30.2	5.61	62.8	54.60
2009	14,299,000	598,000	174,000	424,000	41.7	11.5	30.2	5.45	59.9	55.45
2010	14,718,000	601,000	168,000	433,000	40.7	10.7	30.0	5.26	56.9	56.38
2011	15,146,000	604,000	161,000	444,000	39.7	9.9	29.8	5.08	53.1	57.46
2012	15,581,000	605,000	153,000	452,000	38.6	9.2	29.3	4.90	49.0	58.68
2013	16,025,000	607,000	146,000	461,000	37.7	8.6	29.1	4.76	44.6	59.73
2014	16,478,000	606,000	138,000	468,000	36.5	8.1	28.4	4.57	41.0	60.90
2015	16,939,000	606,000	136,000	470,000	35.83	7.6	27.7	4.38	38.5	61.38
2016	17,406,000	606,000	131,000	475,000	34.2	7.2	27.0	4.22	35.9	62.21
2017	17,881,000	614,000	128,000	486,000	33.7	6.8	26.9	4.11	33.7	62.98
2018	18,368,000	623,000	128,000	496,000	33.2	6.5	26.7	4.02	31.7	63.28
2019	18,867,000	634,000	125,000	509,000	32.9	6.3	26.6	3.95	30.1	64.12
2020	19,377,000	644,000	130,000	514,000	32.5	6.2	26.3	3.88	28.7	63.72
2021	19,890,000	654,000	139,000	515,000	32.1	6.3	25.8	3.79	27.5	62.90
2022					31.7	5.8	25.9	3.72		
2023					31.4	5.4	26.0	3.65		
2024					31.1	5.3	25.9	3.59		
2025					30.8	5.2	25.6	3.53		

View source data.
View source data.
View source data.
View source data.

=== Demographic and Health Surveys ===
Total Fertility Rate (TFR) (Wanted Fertility Rate) and Crude Birth Rate (CBR):

Year	Total		Urban		Rural	
Year	CBR	TFR	CBR	TFR	CBR	TFR
1984	52	7.58				
1992	42.9	6.73 (5.74)	40.5	5.51 (4.38)	43.2	6.88 (5.92)
2000	45.5	6.3 (5.2)	40.8	4.5 (3.5)	46.2	6.7 (5.5)
2004	42.4	6.0 (4.9)	37.0	4.2 (3.3)	43.4	6.4 (5.2)
2010	39.2	5.7 (4.5)	36.0	4.0 (3.3)	39.8	6.1 (4.8)
2015-16	32.2	4.4 (3.4)	29.5	3.0 (2.5)	32.6	4.7 (3.6)
2017	32.1	4.2	27.4	2.8	33.0	4.5
2024	28.4	3.7 (3.1)	25.6	2.8 (2.4)	28.9	3.9 (3.3)

Fertility data as of 2016 (DHS Program):

Region	Total fertility rate	Percentage of women age 15-49 currently pregnant	Mean number of children ever born to women age 40-49
Northern	4.2	8.1	5.7
Central	4.4	7.8	6.2
Southern	4.6	7.3	5.7
Total	4.4	7.6	5.9

== Ethnic groups ==
- Chewa 34.3%
- Tumbuka 9.2%
- Lomwe 18.9%
- Yao 13.2%
- Ngoni 11.4%
- Sena 3.8%
- Mang'anja 3.2%
- Tonga 1.8%
- Nyakyusa 1%
- Asians 0.09%
- Europeans 0.04%
- Other 2.5%

== Languages ==
The official language of Malawi is English and the other common languages understood by the majority of the population are Chichewa and Chitumbuka.

English (official)

- Chichewa 6,180,000
- Chitumbuka - 4,180,000
- Chiyao - 3,760,000
- Chilomwe - 3,290,000
- Chisena - 2,468,000
- Chingoni - 37,500
- Chitonga - 471,000
- Chinyika - 5,000
- Chindali - 70,000
- Chinyakyusa - 149,000
- Chilambya - 59,500

== Religion ==
Protestant 33.5% (includes Church of Central Africa Presbyterian 14.2%, Seventh Day Adventist/Baptist 9.4%, Pentecostal 7.6%, Anglican 2.3%), Roman Catholic 17.2%, other Christian 26.6%, Muslim 13.8%, traditionalist 1.1%, other 5.6%, none 2.1% (2018 est.)

== See also ==
- Malawi
- Malawian American
