= Chitipa North (Malawi Parliament constituency) =

Chitipa North is a constituency for the National Assembly of Malawi, located in the Chitipa District of Malawi's Northern Region. It elects one Member of Parliament by the first past the post system. The constituency was represented by People's Party MP James Ted Kabifya Munthali. In 2025 Faless Debrah Moyo was elected as an independent.

== Election results ==
Parliamentary Election 2014: Chitipa North
Party	Candidate	Votes	%	±%
PP	James Ted Kabifya Munthali	9,177	56.61%	
DPP	Nickson Aradin Masebo (inc.)	6,323	39.00%	
UDF	Frank Webster Kameme	711	4.39%	
Majority		2,854	17.61%	
PP gain from DPP		Swing		
