= Khumbize Chiponda =

Malawian Minister of Health and politician

Khumbize Kandodo Chiponda
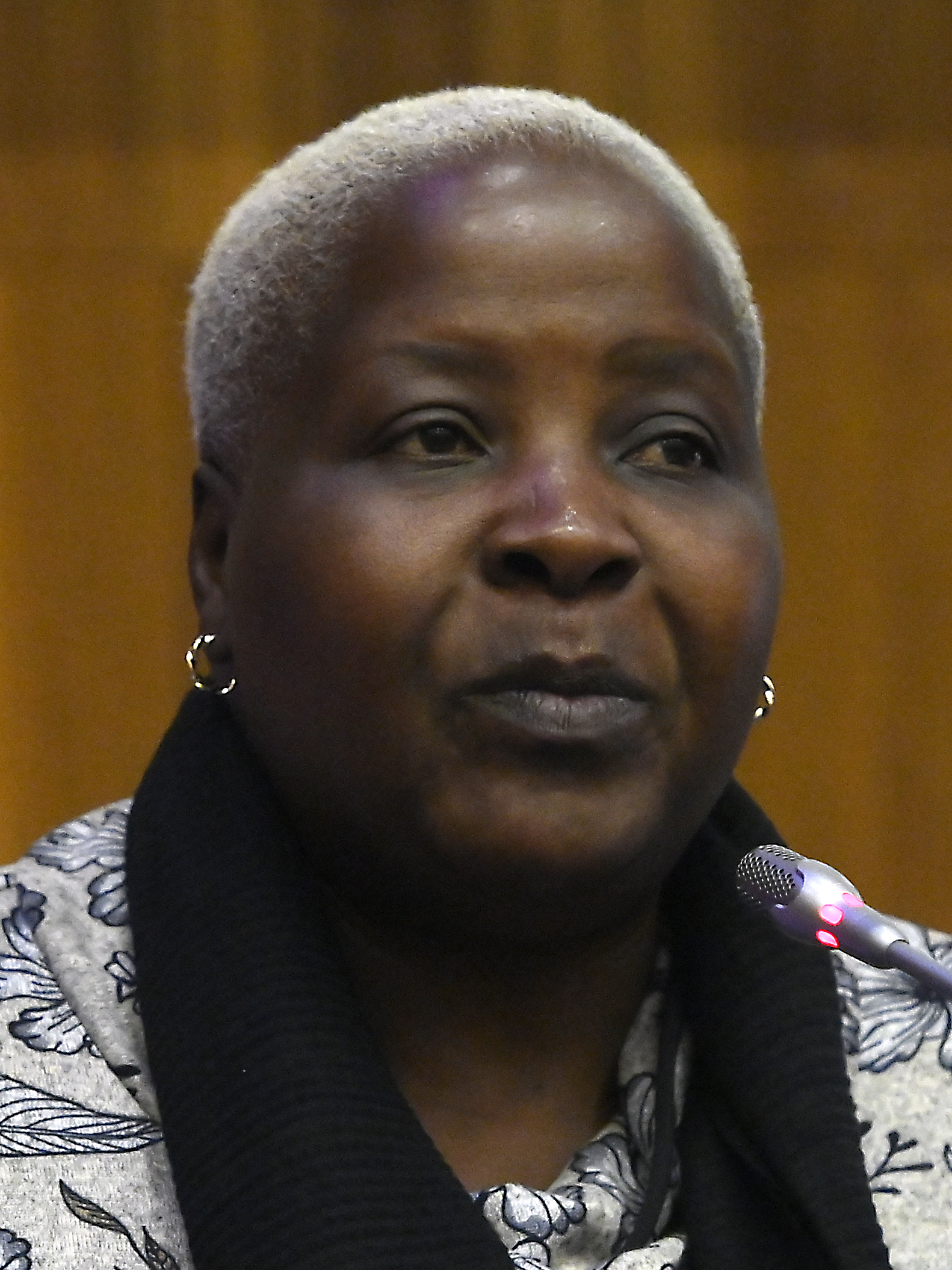
- Khumbize Chiponda at the International Atomic Energy Agency (IAEA) in Vienna, 2024

Minister of Health of Malawi
- In office July 2020 – 15 September 2025
- President: Lazarus Chakwera
- Preceded by: Jappie Mhango
- Succeeded by: Madalitso Baloyi

Member of Parliament for Kasungu South East Constituency
- In office 2014–2025
- President: Lazarus Chakwera

Personal details
- Born: 10 May 1969 (age 57) Malawi
- Party: Malawi Congress Party
- Occupation: Politician
- Profession: Biochemist

Khumbize Kandodo Chiponda (born 10 May 1969) is a Malawian politician. In 2020 she became Minister of Health in Malawi and served until 2025.

== Early life and education ==
Khumbize was born on 10 May 1969 in Malawi, she is the sister of Ken Kandodo, who is also a politician, and related to Malawi's founding president, Hastings Banda. She obtained a Bachelor of Science degree in Biology and Chemistry at Chancellor College, University of Malawi in 1991. She later advanced her studies in South Africa, earning a Bachelor of Pharmacy degree from the University of the Western Cape in 1996. and worked in the Ministry of Health as a biochemist.

== Career as MP ==
In the 2014 general election Chiponda was elected a Malawi Congress Party (MCP) Member of Parliament for the Kasungu South East constituency. In December 2017 Chiponda pressed the Minister of Gender, Children, Disability and Social Welfare, Jean Kalilani, to explain what the private sector was doing to promote early childhood development activities in Malawi. In February 2018 she joined fellow MP Chimwendo Banda in defending the MCP against accusations of atrocities, and attacking "bad ministers" who had stained the MCP image but had subsequently joined the Democratic Progressive Party (DPP). In June 2018 she was announced as Organizing Secretary for the National Executive Committee of the MCP.

She kept her seat in the 2019 general election, and after the election was appointed as Deputy Chief Whip for the MCP. In February 2020 the Malawi Electoral Commission (MEC) commissioner Linda Kunje defended MEC process to a Parliamentary committee inquiring into irregularities which nullified the May 2019 Presidential elections. When Kunje justified "the same forms you are questioning, the incompetence you are talking of" as what had given MPs their positions, Chiponda accused Kunje of undermining the committee and walked out.

== Minister of Health ==
In July 2020 President Lazarus Chakwera appointed Chiponda to the Cabinet of Malawi as Minister of Health with Chrissie Kamanga Kalamula Kanyasho as her Deputy. Chiponda's appointment prompted some accusations of favouritism and nepotism. Chakwera also picked Chiponda to co-chair a Presidential Taskforce on Coronavirus, together with Dr. John Phuka, a College of Medicine lecturer. She secured Germany's ongoing commitment to help the Malawi health sector amid the pandemic. On 27 July 2020 Chiponda issued a directive to health officials in Karonga to test anyone suspected of COVID-19 symptoms at Songwe Border.

In 2024 she wrote for the Guardian about the Climate Crisis in the middle of a national drought after 600 people had died in Malawi due to Hurricane Freddy a year before. She was pleased to see that COP was considering health implications as "we in Malawi are paying for the climate crisis with our lives."

In 2025 she announced a government plan to eradicate cholera by 2030. The plan was supported by international partners including UNICEF and the World Health Organisation.
