= Rachel Mazombwe Zulu =

Malawian politician

Rachel Zulu
- Born: Lilongwe
- Other name: Rachel Patience Mazombwe-Zulu
- Occupations: teacher, administrator, politician and minister
- Employer(s): Malawi Union of Savings and Credit Cooperatives et al
- Known for: representing Mchinji North from 2009
- Political party: Malawi Congress Party
- Spouse: George Zulu

Rachel Mazombwe-Zulu born Rachel Patience Mazombwe is a Malawian politician who was elected to the National Assembly in 2009. She was re-elected again in 2019 and 2025. She became a member of the Malawi Congress Party. She represents the Mchinji North constituency and she has been a government minister.

== Life ==
She was born in Lilongwe. She originally worked as a teacher until she took a job as a clerk entering data for the Ministry of Education, Science and Technology. She then studied for a diploma in business administration. She worked for the Malawi Union of Savings and Credit Cooperatives (MUSCCO).

She was elected in 2009 to represent Mchinji North in the 2009 Malawian general election as an independent. She was re-elected in the 2014 Malawian general election.

She was a member of the Malawi Congress Party, vice-chair of the Malawi Parliamentary Women's Caucus in 2024 and chair in 2025. She was the Minister for Local Government and the Minister for Tourism.

When she was re-elected again in 2019 she and her husband were one of only two husband and wife parliamentarian couples. They were both elected for the Malawi Congress Party. Only a third of the assembly were re-elected MPs. Other notable re-elections were Nancy Tembo, Catherine Gotani Hara and Esther Mcheka Chilenje. She sat on the Public Appointments Committee with Anna Katchiko and Jacquiline Chikuta.

In 2022 she donated an ambulance to assist with the transportation of the sick. It was the first in her constituency. She later complained about voters expectations that politicians would donate item to them mentioning "coffins".

In the 2025 elections she again won her place in the National Assembly after taking over 40% of the votes in the Mchinji North constituency.
