= Chitipa Wenya (Malawi Parliament constituency) =

Chitipa Wenya is a constituency for the National Assembly of Malawi, located in the Chitipa District of Malawi's Northern Region. It elects one Member of Parliament by the first past the post system. The constituency is currently represented by People's Party MP Godfrey Mdulansi Munkhondya.

== Election results ==
Election	Political result	Candidate	Party	Votes	%	±%
Chitipa Wenya general election, 2014; 75 null & void votes Electorate: 10,487; Turnout: 8,806 (83.97%)	PP hold Majority: 570 (6.53%)	Godfrey Mdulansi Munkhondya	PP	2,668	30.56	
Chitipa Wenya general election, 2014; 75 null & void votes Electorate: 10,487; Turnout: 8,806 (83.97%)	PP hold Majority: 570 (6.53%)	Chrinze Vaison Midwell Kayira	Independent	2,098	24.03	
Chitipa Wenya general election, 2014; 75 null & void votes Electorate: 10,487; Turnout: 8,806 (83.97%)	PP hold Majority: 570 (6.53%)	Fwasani Matias Nyondo	NASAF	1,269	14.53	-
Chitipa Wenya general election, 2014; 75 null & void votes Electorate: 10,487; Turnout: 8,806 (83.97%)	PP hold Majority: 570 (6.53%)	Manifesto Crydon Kayira	Independent	990	11.34	-
Chitipa Wenya general election, 2014; 75 null & void votes Electorate: 10,487; Turnout: 8,806 (83.97%)	PP hold Majority: 570 (6.53%)	Davies Paulos Ng'ambi	DPP	566	6.48	-
Chitipa Wenya general election, 2014; 75 null & void votes Electorate: 10,487; Turnout: 8,806 (83.97%)	PP hold Majority: 570 (6.53%)	Peterkins Rodney Kondwani Kayira	Independent	530	6.07	-
Chitipa Wenya general election, 2014; 75 null & void votes Electorate: 10,487; Turnout: 8,806 (83.97%)	PP hold Majority: 570 (6.53%)	Kisty Maureen Namwayi	UDF	457	5.23	-
Chitipa Wenya general election, 2014; 75 null & void votes Electorate: 10,487; Turnout: 8,806 (83.97%)	PP hold Majority: 570 (6.53%)	Headrick M.K. Kayira	MCP	153	1.75	-
