= Chitipa District =

District of Malawi in Northern Region

Coordinates: 9°45′S 33°15′E

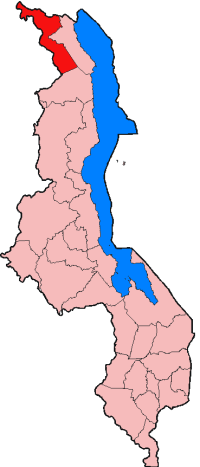
Location of Chitipa District in Malawi

Chitipa District is the northernmost district in the Northern Region of Malawi. The capital is Chitipa (formerly known as Fort Hill). The district covers an area of 4,288 km^{2}, and has a population of 234,927. The major and common language spoken by majority in the district is Chitumbuka. Chitipa borders Karonga District, and neighboring countries Tanzania and Zambia.

The district is divided into five main areas known as Misuku to the east, Kameme to the north, Bulambia right at the centre while Wenya and Nthalire areas are situated to the south.

== Government and administrative divisions ==
There are five National Assembly constituencies in Chitipa:

- Chitipa - Central
- Chitipa - East
- Chitipa - North
- Chitipa - South
- Chitipa - Wenya

Since the 2009 election all of these constituencies have been held by members of the Democratic Progressive Party.

== Demographics ==
=== Ethnic groups ===
At the time of the 2024 Census of Malawi, the distribution of the population of Chitipa District by ethnic group was as follows:

- 55.2% Tumbuka
- 16.5 Lambya
- 8.4% Sukwa
- 3.1% Nkhonde
- 0.1% Chewa
- 0.1% Ngoni
- 0.1% Lomwe
- 0.1% Yao
- 0.0% Sena
- 14.5% Others

=== Languages ===
A number of different languages and dialects are spoken in the district. The common and major language is Chitumbuka, followed by Chilambya.

- 80% Chitumbuka (also lingua franca of the region)
- 15% Chindali / Chisukwa / Chilambya
- 3% Chinyiha / Chinyika
- 2% Other

The district is home to a number of languages of Bantu origin mainly of Malawi and Tanzania. Other languages are dialects of the main languages such as Nyika dialect with influence from Chitumbuka but of Nyiha language.
