= Zomba Nsondole Constituency =

Malawian electoral constituency

- First-past-the-post constituency for the Parliament of Malawi
- District: Zomba
- Region: Southern Region

Current constituency
- Party: became DPP
- Member: Amina Kajiya

Zomba Nsondole Constituency is a constituency for the National Assembly of Malawi, located in the Zomba District of Malawi's Southern Region. It is one of the 10 constituencies in the district that elects one member of parliament by the first past the post system.

The constituency has several wards, all electing councilors for the Zomba District. In 2009, the member of parliament who represented the constituency was Jenipher Deborah Chilunga.

In 2019 there was a considerable protest after Abu Naliwa was declared the winner. Five village headmen led the protest arguing that the result was rigged by the winner.

== Members of parliament ==
Elections	MP	Party	Notes	References
2009	Jenipher Deborah Chilunga	DPP	Multi-party system	
2019	Abu Naliwa		Multi-party system	
2025	Amina Kajiya	Independent	Multi-party system	
