= Chimango Mughogho =

Malawian politician

Chimango Chimpimpha Mughogho-Gondwe is a Malawian politician. She is the current Deputy Minister of Local Government and Rural Development. She is the former Deputy Minister of Persons with Disability and the Elderly. She was a Member of the National Assembly for Chitipa South Constituency, but lost in the People's Party primaries for the 2014 election. She then decided to stand as an independent candidate, but lost.
