= Mzimba Kafukule Constituency =

Malawian electoral constituency

- First-past-the-post constituency for the Parliament of Malawi
- District: Mzimba
- Region: Northern Region

Current constituency
- Member: Madalitso Chidumu Bayoli

Mzimba Kafukule Constituency is a constituency for the National Assembly of Malawi, located in the Mzimba District of Malawi's Northern Region.

== Description ==
It is one of 13 constituencies in Mzimba District. It elects one Member of Parliament by the first past the post system. The constituency has wards electing councillors for the Mzimba District.

== Members of parliament ==
In the 2025 election there were eight candidates for the seat including candidates from the major political parties in Malawi. Madalitso Baloyi was the person chosen and she was an independent. Baloyi was made the Minister of Health after she was elected.

Elections	MP	Party	Notes	References
2025	Madalitso Chidumu Bayoli	Independent	Multi-party system	
