= Balaka South Constituency =

Malawian electoral constituency

- First-past-the-post constituency for the Parliament of Malawi
- District: Balaka
- Region: Southern Region

Current constituency
- Party: Independent
- Member(s): Ireen Mambala

Balaka South Constituency is a constituency for the National Assembly of Malawi, located in the Balaka District of Malawi's Southern Region. It is one of the 4 constituencies in the district that elects one member of parliament by the first past the post system.

The constituency has several wards, all electing councilors for the Balaka District. In 2009, the member of parliament who represented the constituency was George Nnensa and from 2019 it was Ireen Mambala who won her seat against nine other male contenders.

== Members of parliament ==
Elections	MP	Party	Notes	References
2009	George Nnensa	Mafunde	Multi-party system	
2019	Ireen Mambala	Independent	Multi-party system	
