= Bwaila Hospital =

Geography
- Location: Lilongwe, Malawi
- Coordinates: 13°59′31″S 33°46′28″E

Organisation
- Care system: public

Bwaila Hospital is a regional public hospital in Lilongwe, Malawi, offering free healthcare. It is said to be the largest maternity facility in Southern Africa; about 24,000 babies are born there every year.

== Description ==
The hospital is a public hospital offering free healthcare. It is said to be the largest maternity facility in Southern Africa. Around 2,000 babies are born here every month.

Wilson Ching'ani, the Lilongwe District Director of Health and Sanitation Services, has noted that the staff are dedicated but there are too few staff at the hospital and they are "overwhelmed". 60 or more births occur every day. One nurse may care for thirty mothers and at night it may be forty mothers. The hospital has just two operating tables. Mothers will give birth on the floor, ten babies can occupy each bed and an incubator with just one monitor looks after four premature babies. National figures indicate that there are 224 mothers who die per 100,000 live births and there are 24 newborn deaths per 1,000 live births. These are above international targets.

== Facilities ==
The hospital has a separate 45-bed obstetric fistula care centre with its own operating theatre, a doctor and 14 specialised nurses (as of 2026). As well as its regular service, the centre operates camps where 90 women are treated for this devastating childbirth injury over a two-week period. The success rate for the fistula repair operations is said to be over 90%. It was funded by the British businessperson Dame Ann Gloag, who used to be a nurse. They deal with 400 women a year. The centre trains up some of its successful patients to become ambassadors. Women made incontinent by their fistula learn to live with the embarrassment and ostracisation that can result. The ambassadors are able to persuade these women to attend so they can lead a better life.

In 2024 Bwaila hospital added a building, the RuSH clinic, which specialises in sexually transmitted diseases. There has been an STD facility at the hospital for fifty years, but a generous donation allowed a new building to be constructed. The clinic deals with 80 to 100 patients every day.

== Corruption ==
Journalists in Malawi discovered corruption in Blantyre's Queen Elizabeth Central Hospital and Lilongwe's Kamuzu Central Hospital in 2026. They reported similar practices at district hospitals in Chiradzulu, Likoma and Thyolo Districts. In March 2026 the Minister of Health, Madalitso Baloyi, disguised herself and visited Bwaila Hospital under the name "Mercy Banda" to investigate allegations of corruption there. As she waited in the queue for three hours, she saw people paying bribes to jump the queue, and saw that there was little regard for the privacy of patients.

A presidential decree had recently reminded staff that they were not allowed to operate a private service or charge fees. There were also government reminders to end corruption in public hospitals, but Bwaila hospital patients reported that while they waited for their free treatment, there was a fast lane for those who paid the unofficial fee. Baloyi's visit was confirmed by Wilson Ching'ani, who added that corruption remained a continuing problem.
