= Chitipa East (Malawi Parliament constituency) =

Electoral constituency of the Parliament of Malawi

Chitipa East is a constituency for the National Assembly of Malawi, located in the Chitipa District of Malawi's Northern Region. It elects one Member of Parliament by the first past the post system. The constituency was represented by Malawi Congress Party MP Kezzie Msukwa until 2025.

== Election results ==
Election	Political result	Candidate	Party	Votes	%	±%
Chitipa East general election, 2014; 74 spoilt votes Electorate: 12,449; Turnout: 13,718 (90.75%)	DPP gain from PP; Majority: 967 (7.81%)	Chizamsoka Oliver Mulwafu	DPP	5,703	46.08	
Chitipa East general election, 2014; 74 spoilt votes Electorate: 12,449; Turnout: 13,718 (90.75%)	DPP gain from PP; Majority: 967 (7.81%)	Kezzie Kasambala Msukwa (inc.)	PP	4,736	38.27	
Chitipa East general election, 2014; 74 spoilt votes Electorate: 12,449; Turnout: 13,718 (90.75%)	DPP gain from PP; Majority: 967 (7.81%)	Alie Alinuswe Willfred Pwele	UDF	1,048	8.47	-
Chitipa East general election, 2014; 74 spoilt votes Electorate: 12,449; Turnout: 13,718 (90.75%)	DPP gain from PP; Majority: 967 (7.81%)	Maria Siya Nachisale	MCP	716	5.79	-
Chitipa East general election, 2014; 74 spoilt votes Electorate: 12,449; Turnout: 13,718 (90.75%)	DPP gain from PP; Majority: 967 (7.81%)	Kenson Philip Malanga	Independent	172	1.39	-

Election	Political result	Candidate	Party	Votes	%	±%
Chitipa East general election, 2009; 365 spoilt votes Electorate: 12,151; Turnout: 11,582 (95.32%)	Independent hold Majority: 718 (6.40%)	Kezzie Kasambala Msukwa	Independent	5,785	51.57	
Chitipa East general election, 2009; 365 spoilt votes Electorate: 12,151; Turnout: 11,582 (95.32%)	Independent hold Majority: 718 (6.40%)	Kenson Philip Malanga	New Republican	5,067	45.17	
Chitipa East general election, 2009; 365 spoilt votes Electorate: 12,151; Turnout: 11,582 (95.32%)	Independent hold Majority: 718 (6.40%)	Chizamsoka Oliver Mulwafu (inc.)	DPP	365	3.25	-
