= Mzimba East Constituency =

Malawian electoral constituency

- First-past-the-post constituency for the Parliament of Malawi
- District: Mzimba
- Region: Northern Region
- Major settlements: Ekwendeni

Current constituency
- Party: independent
- Member: Mines Ng'oma

Mzimba East Constituency is a constituency for the National Assembly of Malawi, located in the Mzimba District of Malawi's Northern Region. It is one of 13 constituencies in Mzimba District. It elects one Member of Parliament by the first past the post system. The constituency has six wards, all electing councillors for the Mzimba District. The constituency is currently represented by independent MP Mines Ng'oma who replaced Richard Chavula in 2025. Richard had replaced Wezie Ng'oma who was a good MP but she died in 2021.

== Members of parliament ==
Elections	MP	Party	Notes	References
1994	Emmanuel Chirwa	MCP	Multi-party system	
1999	Cornelius Mwalwanda	MCP	Multi-party system	
2009	Emily Mwimba	MCP	Multi-party system	
2019	Wezzie Gondwe (died 2021) => Richard Chavula	MCP	Multi-party system	
2025	Mines Ng'oma	Independent	Multi-party system	

== Wards ==
Sources

- Chafwa Ward
- Champhira Ward
