= Chitipa South (Malawi Parliament constituency) =

Chitipa South is a constituency for the National Assembly of Malawi, located in the Chitipa District of Malawi's Northern Region. It elects one Member of Parliament by the first past the post system. The constituency is currently represented by People's Party MP Werani Chilenga.

== Election results ==
Election	Political result	Candidate	Party	Votes	%	±%
Chitipa South general election, 2014; 75 spoilt votes Electorate: 16,164; Turnout: 12,440 (76.96%)	PP hold Majority: 3,292 (26.62%)	Werani Chilenga	PP	5,745	46.46	
Chitipa South general election, 2014; 75 spoilt votes Electorate: 16,164; Turnout: 12,440 (76.96%)	PP hold Majority: 3,292 (26.62%)	Lyson Jones Mwandukutu Chione	Independent	2,453	19.84	
Chitipa South general election, 2014; 75 spoilt votes Electorate: 16,164; Turnout: 12,440 (76.96%)	PP hold Majority: 3,292 (26.62%)	Chimango Mughogho (inc.)	Independent	2,376	19.22	-
Chitipa South general election, 2014; 75 spoilt votes Electorate: 16,164; Turnout: 12,440 (76.96%)	PP hold Majority: 3,292 (26.62%)	P.K. Mwelekete Kalua	DPP	801	6.48	-
Chitipa South general election, 2014; 75 spoilt votes Electorate: 16,164; Turnout: 12,440 (76.96%)	PP hold Majority: 3,292 (26.62%)	Bruce Cornet Munthali	NARC	428	3.46	-
Chitipa South general election, 2014; 75 spoilt votes Electorate: 16,164; Turnout: 12,440 (76.96%)	PP hold Majority: 3,292 (26.62%)	Carton Ephraim Sichinga	UDF	396	3.20	-
Chitipa South general election, 2014; 75 spoilt votes Electorate: 16,164; Turnout: 12,440 (76.96%)	PP hold Majority: 3,292 (26.62%)	Manuel Kakoko Kaluwa Kandawa	MCP	106	0.86	-
Chitipa South general election, 2014; 75 spoilt votes Electorate: 16,164; Turnout: 12,440 (76.96%)	PP hold Majority: 3,292 (26.62%)	Yobe-Yobe Kawonga	NASAF	60	0.49	-
