= Madalitso Baloyi =

Malawian politician and minister

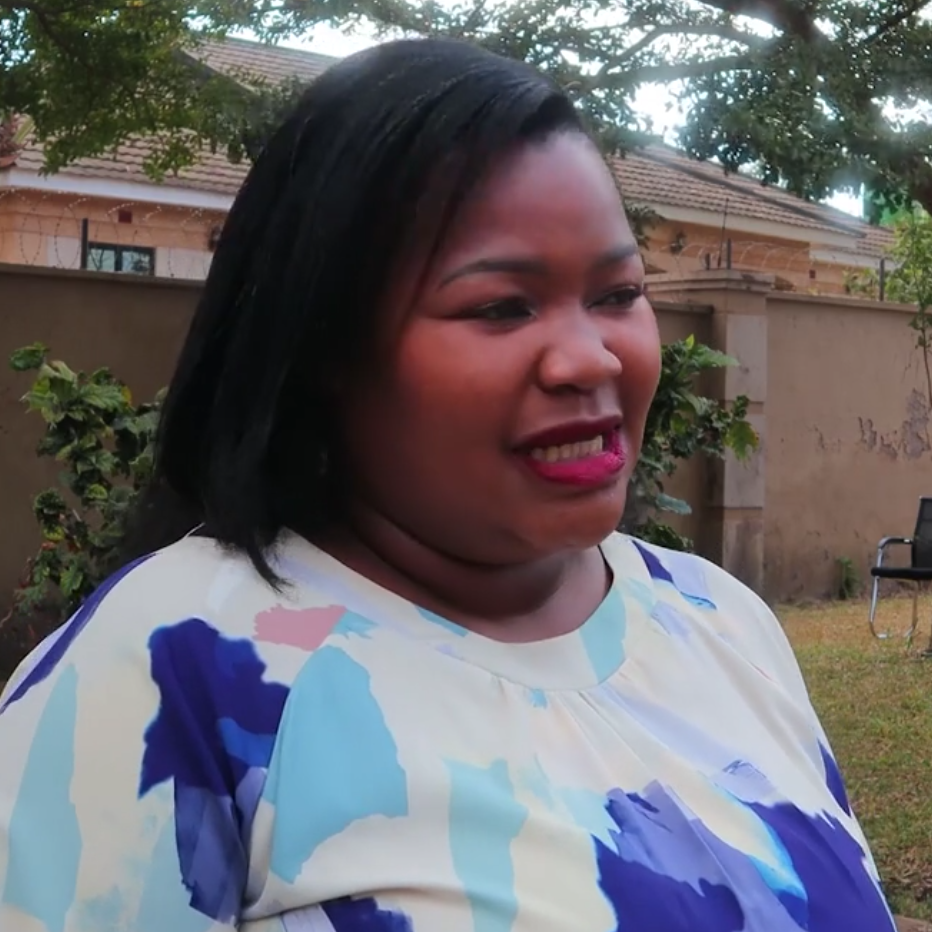
- Baloyi in 2024

Minister of Health and Sanitation
- Incumbent
- Assumed office 30 October 2025
- President: Peter Mutharika
- Preceded by: Khumbize Chiponda

Personal details
- Citizenship: Malawian
- Education: University of Malawi
- Occupation: Politician

Madalitso Chidumu Baloyi is a Malawian politician and public health worker. She was elected to the National Assembly and became Minister of Health and Sanitation in 2025.

== Early life and career ==
Madalitso Chidumu Baloyi was born around 1988 and began her career at Queen Elizabeth Central Hospital before working in agribusiness, public service, and health administration. She graduated from the University of Malawi in 2010 with a degree in Agribusiness Management and later completed a Master of Business Administration (MBA) at the same institution in 2015.

In 2024, Baloyi supported an orphanage run by Temwani Chilenga in Lilongwe. She also advocated for children's rights; at the time, estimates indicated that 15% of children in Malawi were orphans.

In the 2025 election, Baloyi stood for election in the Mzimba Kafukule Constituency. Eight candidates contested the seat, including nominees from Malawi's major political parties. Baloyi won the election as an independent in her first bid for the National Assembly. She was one of over a dozen women who were elected as independent women MPs - the others included Faless Debrah Moyo, Phoebe Chikaonda and Abigail Shariff and Ireen Mambala.

Bayoli was appointed as the minister of Health and Sanitation by President Peter Mutharika on 30 October 2025, succeeding Khumbize Chiponda. Mutharika's choice of Baloyi to lead the health ministry was noted as an appointment based on merit.

In March 2026, Baloyi unveiled a joint initiative with China and UNICEF to reduce deaths of mothers and newborns in the areas of Balaka, Mwanza, and Nkhata Bay in Malawi. The two-year project attempted to reduce the high number of newborn deaths using training and new equipment. It was announced by Baloyi, Chinese ambassador to Malawi Lu Xu, and Penelope Campbell of UNICEF. She also founded and led the Impact Centre for Economic Empowerment and Development (ICEED).

In April 2026, Baloyi spoke about a policy of removing Neglected Tropical Diseases (NTDs) by 2030. Progress had been made on several diseases but others such as the paralytic sleeping sickness still needed to be tackled, even as WHO funding was being reduced.

== Healthcare undercover case ==
In March 2026, Baloyi conducted an undercover visit to Bwaila Hospital in Lilongwe to confirm firsthand allegations of corruption in public health facilities. Disguised as an ordinary patient under the name "Mercy Banda", she spent about three hours waiting for treatment. She reported incidents of bribery, long queues, and breaches of patient privacy, including clinicians allegedly prioritising patients who paid money to be assisted faster. The visit was part of a government effort to enforce a presidential directive aimed at curbing corruption in public hospitals.

Baloyi was commended for her investigation, which found that patients at the medical facility were aware that, while they waited for free treatment, others could access a faster service by paying unofficial fees. Her visit was confirmed by Wilson Ching'ani, the Lilongwe District Director of Health and Sanitation Services. A recent presidential decree had reminded staff that they were prohibited from operating private services or charging additional fees. Ching'ani acknowledged that corruption remained a continuing problem, but said that the hospital was understaffed and that employees were "overwhelmed."
