= Ndali people =

Ethnic group from Songwe Region, Tanzania

Ndali
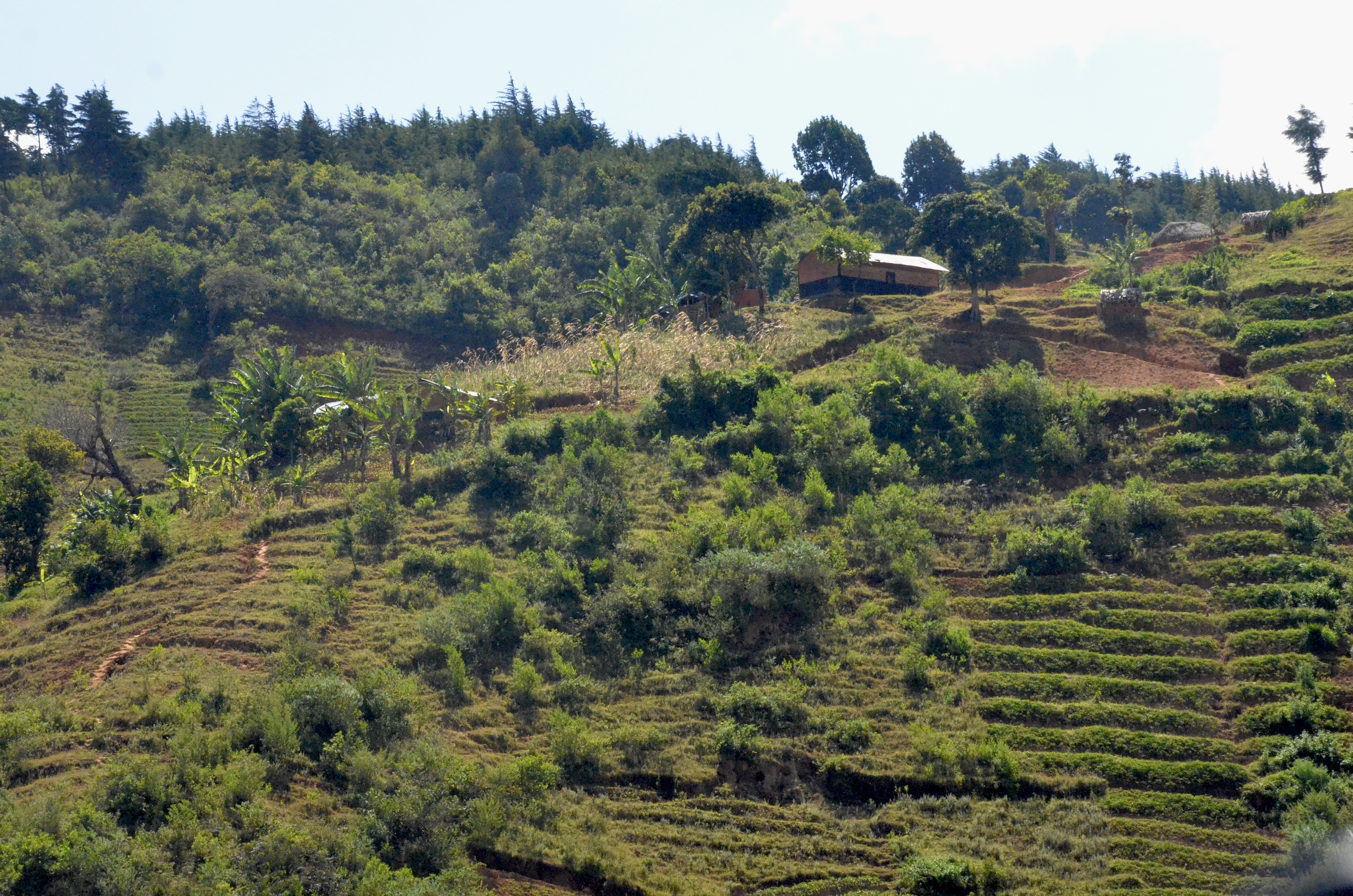
- The village of Kalembo

Total population
- 440,000

Regions with significant populations
- Tanzania and Malawi

Religion
- Christian; African indigenous religion

The Ndali are a Bantu ethnolinguistic group native to Ileje District, Songwe Region, Tanzania, and northern Malawi. In 1987, the Ndali population of Tanzania was estimated to number 150,000, and in 2003 the population in Malawi was estimated at 70,000, for a total for the group of about 220,000. Their language is related to many Bantu languages, for example Nyakyusa.
