= Lambya language =

Bantu language spoken in Tanzania and Malawi

Lambya
- Ichilambya
- Native to: Tanzania, Malawi
- Ethnicity: Lambya
- Native speakers: 100,000 (2009–2017)
- Language family: Niger–Congo?: Atlantic–Congo; Benue–Congo; Bantoid; Bantu; Rukwa; Mbozi; Mbeya; South; Lambya
- Writing system: Latin script Mwangwego script

Official status
- Recognised minority language in: Malawi

Language codes
- ISO 639-3: lai
- Glottolog: lamb1272
- Guthrie code: M.201,202

Lambya (Rambia) is a Bantu language of Tanzania and Malawi. In Northern Malawi it is spoken particularly in the Chitipa District.

Sukwa, once thought to be a dialect of Nyakyusa, is now considered to be a dialect of Lambya. The University of Malawi Language Mapping Survey for Northern Malawi (2006), agreeing with this, found that the three languages Cilambya, Cindali, and Cisukwa form a single dialect group, although there are differences between them, especially between Cilambya and the other two. The examples below come in the order Lambya, Ndali, Sukwa:

- Person = umunthu, umundu, umundu
- Grasshopper = imphanzi, imbashi, imbasi
- Scorpion = kalizga, kalisha, kalisya
- Maize = ivilombe, ifilombe, ifilombe
- Dog = imbwa, ukabwa, ukabwa
- Bird = chiyuni, kayuni, kayuni
- Snail = inkhozo, ingofu, ingofo

== An example of Lambya ==
The Language Mapping Survey gives further vocabulary and also a short text (the Tortoise and the Hare) in all three dialects. The Lambya version of the story goes as follows:

UKALULU NU KAYAMBA (Lambia)
Mukaya mukaŵa izala. Po ukayamba akaya pakulaŵa ivyakulya ku ŵanthu. Nanthi ŵamupa ivyakulya vila akapotwagha ukuyamula chifukwa chakuti mupimpha. Chifukwa chinicho akapinyilira isaka kulukusa ulutali leka, lo akivwalika munsingo. Nanthi anda pakwenda isaka lira likamukonkhe zyanga munyumwa mwache.

Ŵoachili akwenda ukuya ku nyumba kwache, Ukalulu akiza munyuma. Akati alyenya isaka lira akanena ukuti: "Nalombola isaka, lyane!" Ukayamba akiza ati "We Kalulu, isaka linilo lyane, enia ulukusa ulu imphinyiliye munsingo ukuti ponkwenda ingusaghe." Ukalulu akiza akana akati: "Pofwandi tuŵuke kwa mwene aye atulonganie." Ukalulu akati anena ŵunuŵo ŵakiza ŵaya kwa mwene kula. Umwene yula akadumula ukuti wadumule ulukusa lo Ukayamba akavwala musingo nukusenda isaka lira ukumupa Ukalulu.

Isiku ilyinji Ukalulu akendagha, Ukayamba akiza munyuma mwache. Akiza anena ukuti: "Nalombola umusinda wane!" Ukalulu akati "Asa! Wefulu umusinda tewako wane!" Ufulu akakana akati "Nalombola wane." Po ŵovyawa ŵunuŵu ŵosi ŵaŵiri ŵakiza ŵapangana ukuti ŵaye kwa mwene aye aŵalonganie. Kwa mwene kula inongwa yikiza yamunoghela Ukayamba. Umwene akiza adumula ukuti ŵadumule umusinda wa Kalulu ŵamupe Ukayamba.

The story may be translated as follows:

In the village there was a famine. So Tortoise went to beg food from people. When they gave him that food he wasn't able to carry it because he was short. For this reason he tied a sack to a very long rope and wore it round his neck. As he was walking along that sack was following behind him.

As he was going to his home, Hare was coming behind him. When he saw that sack he said, "I've found it, my sack!" Tortoise said, "Hare, this sack is mine! See this rope I've tied to my neck so that when walking I can pull it." Hare denied it saying, "It's better we go to the chief so that he can decide." When Hare said this, they went to that chief. That chief judged that they should cut Tortoise's rope and take the sack and give it to Hare.

Another day, when Hare was walking, Tortoise came behind him. He said: "I've found it, my tail!" Hare said, "Nonsense! The tail isn't yours, it's mine!" Tortoise denied it saying, "I found it, it's mine." Since this was the situation, they both decided that they should go to the chief so that he could decide. At the chief's the case went in favour of Tortoise. The chief decided that they should cut off Hare's tail and give it to Tortoise.
