= Khadija Chunga =

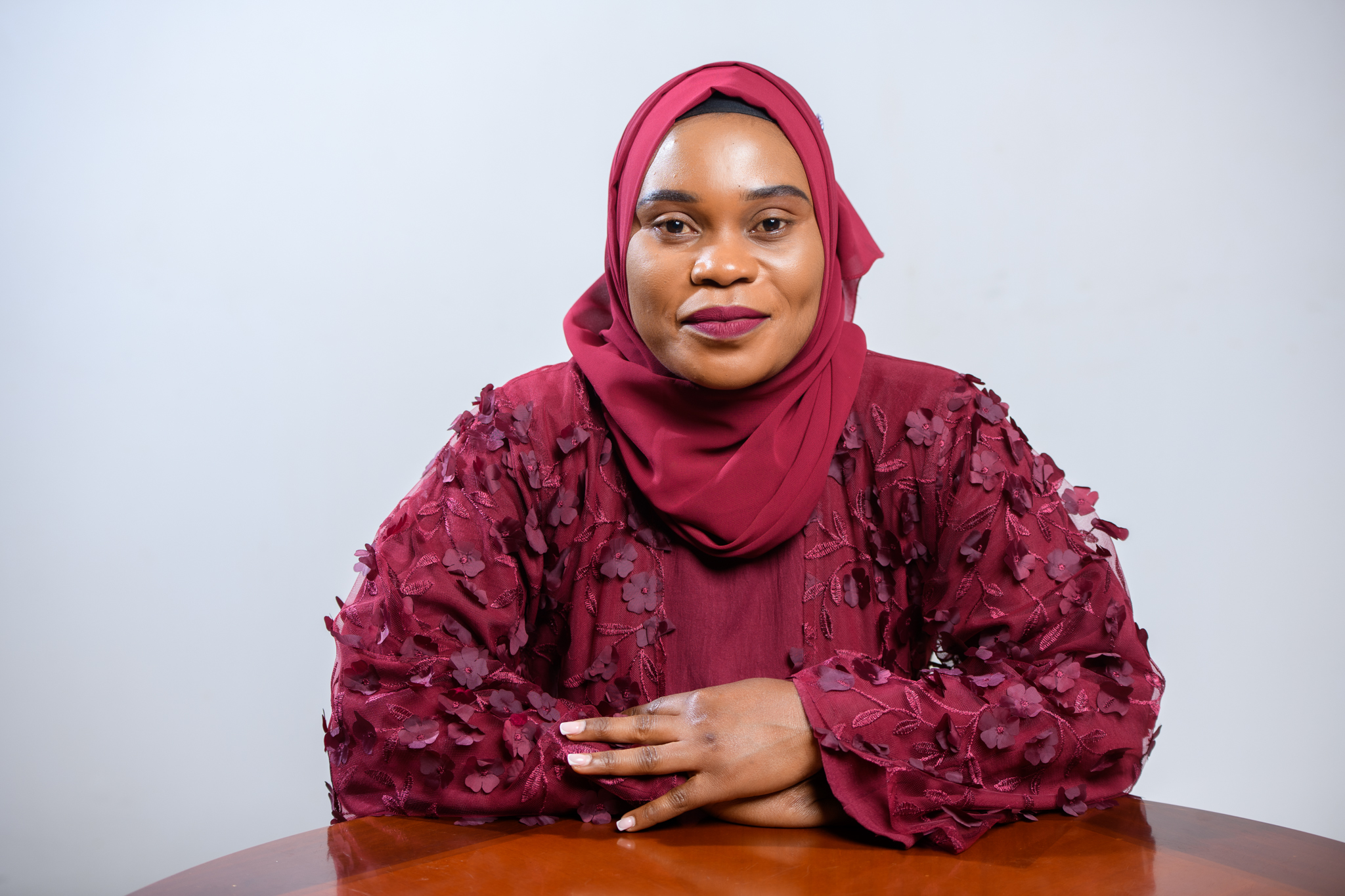
- Honourable Khadijah Leah Chunga MP
- Born: c.1991
- Known for: MP for Lilongwe City Kamphuno
- Political party: independent

Khadija Leah Chunga (born c.1991) is a Malawian independent politician who was elected to the National Assembly to represent Lilongwe City Kamphuno in 2025.

== Life ==
Chunga was born about 1991. She said that she learned about political issues while listening to people talking at her mother's hair salon.

In 2023 Chunga was the national secretary for the Muslim women National Dawah when they organised a national gathering of Muslims in Lilongwe. The message of addressing climate change was backed by the first lady Monica Chakwera.

In 2025 she stood as an independent candidate in the national elections and she enjoyed the support of NGO's including Oxfam. She was successful and she was elected to represent the Lilongwe Kamphuno Constituency on 16 September

Following the election her victory was declared by the Malawi Electoral Commission (MEC) despite the protests of Clement Mwale who was a losing candidate. His case resulted in the case of Mwale v Chunga & MEC. He alleged that Chunga committed a number of offences including bribing voters and campaigning after she should have stopped on 15 September. The judge, Fiona Atupele Mwale rejected Mwale's petition.

In May 2026, Chunga's constituency was chosen to host the women's caucus's from Malawi, Zambia, Mozambique and Zimbabwe. The event was funded by Oxfam. Esther Jolobala called on her country's electors to create more women MPs noting that Patricia Kaliati was now serving her fifth term.

== Private life ==
Chunga is married and they are parents. She said that her husband did not initially support her ambitions.
