= Ndali language =

Bantu language spoken in Tanzania

Ndali
- Chindali
- Native to: Tanzania, Malawi
- Ethnicity: Ndali
- Native speakers: (220,000 cited 1987–2003)
- Language family: Niger–Congo?: Atlantic–Congo; Benue–Congo; Southern Bantoid; Bantu; Rukwa; Rungwe; Ndali
- Writing system: Latin script Mwangwego script

Language codes
- ISO 639-3: ndh
- Glottolog: ndal1241
- Guthrie code: M.301

Ndali, or Chindali, is a Bantu language spoken in southern Tanzania by 480,000 people and in northern Malawi by 70,000 (2003).

Sukwa, or Chisukwa, spoken in the Misuku Hills of northern Malawi, is closely related to Ndali, and both languages are fairly close to Lambya.

The examples below come in the order Lambya, Ndali, Sukwa, showing the similarity of vocabulary:

- Person = umunthu, umundu, umundu
- Grasshopper = imphanzi, imbashi, imbasi
- Scorpion = kalizga, kalisha, kalisya
- Maize = ivilombe, ifilombe, ifilombe
- Dog = imbwa, ukabwa, ukabwa
- Bird = chiyuni, kayuni, kayuni
- Snail = inkhozo, ingofu, ingofo
