= Susan Dossi =

Malawian politician

- Occupation: politician
- Known for: MP for Chikwawa West Constituency
- Political party: DPP => United Democratic Front
- Parent: Moses Dossi

Susan Dossi is a Malawian member of the National Assembly for Chikwawa West Constituency. She is the chair of the he Parliamentary Committee on Media and Communications.

== Life ==
Dossi is the daughter of Moses Dossi who had been Malawi's sports minister. He died in 2024.

She was elected for the Chikwawa West Constituency in May 2019 as an independent. She entered parliament but it appeared that no party had a majority and the hung parliament may have led to slow decisions. The Democratic Progressive Party President Peter Mutharika appealed to independents like Dossi to support the government. 32 agreed including Lyana Lexa Tambala, Roseby Gadama, Ireen Mambala, Abigail Shariff and Nancy Chada.

She later joined the DPP. She has been the National Assembly's vice chairperson for media, communication and information. She is a member of the Malawi Parliamentary Women's Caucus.

On 23 June 2020 her party the DPP lost the election. Dossi changed her allegiance and joined the United Transformation Movement (UTM).

In 2021, she gave starter kits to children from her constituency who have been accepted by National Secondary Schools. She encouraged them to work hard so that they could assist their neighborhood and go on to university. The students received school bags, luggage, clothes and writing materials.

Dossi wore sackcloth to the National Assembly to draw attention to the poor state of the local road to Chapananga. In February 2024 she was welcoming the news that the President had announced that the Chikwawa road was to be repaired. The road would give access to nearby Mozambique for exports of farm produce and allow better access to medical facilities.

In 2024, as part of her role as chair of the Parliamentary Committee on Media and Communications, she was reminding public bodies about Malawi's Access to Information Act which was passed on 2016 and came into force in 2020.

Dossi was a member of the Public Accounts Committee which also included Amina Kajiya, Patricia Kaliati and Ireen Mambala. That committee conducted a Special Public Inquiry into the Purchase of the Amaryllis Hotel by the Public Service Pension Trust Fund. Their report was published in March 2026 and it found numerous failings and that the sale broke the "fundamental principles that govern the management of [a] public pension asset".
