= Nyakyusa language =

Bantu language spoken in East Africa

Nyakyusa
- Ngonde
- Native to: Tanzania, Malawi
- Ethnicity: Nyakyusa
- Native speakers: 1,359,000 (2009-2016) (including Sukwa)
- Language family: Niger–Congo?: Atlantic–Congo; Volta-Congo; Benue–Congo; Bantoid; Southern Bantoid; Bantu; Rukwa; Rungwe; Nyakyusa
- Writing system: Latin script Mwangwego script

Official status
- Recognised minority language in: Malawi

Language codes
- ISO 639-3: nyy
- Glottolog: nyak1260
- Guthrie code: M.31
- Linguasphere: 99-AUS-v incl. inner units & varieties 99-AUS-va...-vd

Nyakyusa, or Nyakyusa-Ngonde (Swahili: Kinyakyusa), is a Bantu language of Tanzania and Malawi spoken by the Nyakyusa people around the northern end of Lake Malawi. There is no single name for the language as a whole; its dialects are Nyakyusa, Ngonde (Konde), Kukwe, Mwamba (Lungulu), and Selya (Salya, Seria) of Tanzania. Disregarding the Bantu language prefixes Iki- and Ki-, the language is also known as Konde ~ Nkhonde, Mombe, Nyekyosa ~ Nyikyusa, and Sochile ~ Sokili.

Sukwa is often listed as another dialect; however, according to Nurse (1988) and Fourshey (2002), it is a dialect of Lambya.

In Malawi, Nyakusa and Kyangonde are spoken in the northern part of Karonga District, on the shore of Lake Malawi, close to the border with Tanzania, while Nkhonde is spoken the centre of the district, including in the town of Karonga.

According to the Language Mapping Survey for Northern Malawi, carried out by the Centre for Language Studies of the University of Malawi, "Nyakyuska, though spoken by very few people, mainly at Iponga in Sub T/ A Mwakawoko’s area, is regarded as the parent language from which Kyangonde and Chinkhonde originated. Kyangonde, on the other hand, is regarded as the most prestigious and standard language/dialect of the district. Chinkhonde is seen as a dialect of Kyangonde which has been heavily influenced by Citumbuka."

The same Survey contains a folktale (the Tortoise and the Hare) in Chinkhonde and other languages of Northern Malawi, as well as some comparative vocabulary.

Below is the Tortoise and the Hare folktale in Chinkhonde.

== Similarities to other African languages ==
It is closely related to Kyangonde and Swahili and is related to Yao, Bemba, Mambwe-lungu, Chichewa.

Sample text from Bible

Mwalululu, Yehova ikwisa kutwabula ku nifwa, kangi inifwa yitisa kuyako bwila na bwila!

Translation

Very soon, Jehovah will free all humans from death, and death will be gone forever!

KALULU NU UFULU:
Ufulu abukire polenga ifyakulya ku bandu. Pakwegha thumba lyake akapinyilira ku
luropo litali no fwara msingo lyake, linga akwenda lithumba likisagha mnyuma.
Apo akagha mu njira, ukalulu akisagha mnyuma papo atiri “ehe, thumba lyangu” Ufulu
atiri, we thumba lyangu ili keta luropo mphinyilire nkhuguza linga nkwenda”. Ukalulu
akanire ayobire kuti “Tubuke kumphala kuburongo”. Mphala yolongire batumire
chingwe icho Ufulu apinyilire thumba. Bakegha thumba bampere Ukalulu. Lisiku limo
Ukalulu akendagha, Ufulu amwaghire papo atiri “ehe, mchira wangu!” Ukalulu atiri “Sa!
We fulu mchira wangu ubu”. Ufulu akanire po atiri “nsalire wangu”. Babukire sona ku
Mphala kuburongi. Ku Mphala inongwa yinoghire Ufulu. Batumwire mchira wa Kalulu
no mupa Fulu.

== Writing system ==
Nyakyusa Alphabet (used in the Teti magazine)
a	b	nd	e	f	g	ngʼ	h	i	ị	j	k	l	m	n	o	p	s	t	u	ụ	w	y

Nyakyusa Alphabet (Felberg)
a	b	nd	e	f	g	h	i	í	j	k	l	m	n	ngʼ	o	p	s	t	u	ú	w	y

Nyakyusa Alphabet (SIL)
a	b	e	f	g	h	i	ɨ	j	k	l	m	mb	n	nd	ng	ngʼ	nj	ny	o	p	s	t	u	ʉ	w	y
