= Rhita Sanga =

Malawian politician

- in 2026
- Occupation: Politician
- Known for: MP for Mchinji West Constituency

Rhita Langa Sanga is a Malawian politician who has represented the Mchinji West Constituency since 2025.

== Career ==
In 2018 Sanga ran as an independent candidate of the Mchinji East constituency. She won less than 7% of the votes and Kayo Zinchetera, who stood for the Malawi Congress Party, won the constituency.

left to right: Lynda Ndovie-Jere, Rhita Sanga MP, Linda Luwayo Zinjani, Journalist Yvonnie Akonda Sundu and Superintendent Gift Likoswe

In 2025 Sanga ran for a second time and won the election in the Mchinji West Constituency. She became the vice-chair of the National Assembly's Media and Information Technology committee in November 2025. The chair was Kingwell Liphuka, and they were elected to serve until 2030. She attended the fourth Annual Media and Access to Information Conference (AMATIC) in 2026, organised by the Media Council of Malawi, the Malawi Human Rights Commission (MHRC), the Gender and Justice Unit and the Centre for Human Rights and Rehabilitation (CHRR).

In March 2026 she was elected to be the vice chair of the Sexual Reproductive Health and Rights (SRHR) Project Technical Working Group (TWG). The chair of the group was Chikondi Chisale. In June she spoke out at the alarming number of teen pregnancies, cautioning the men who exploited them. She noted that there were over 4,000 pregnancies in Mchija District and her words were echoed by Mchinji District Commissioner Reinhard Chavula.
