= Lyana Lexa Tambala =

Malawian politician

Lyana Lexa Tambala is a politician in Malawi. From 1999 to 2000 she was the Deputy Minister of Agriculture and from 2003 to 2004 she was Deputy Minister of Education, Science and Technology.

== Life ==
Tambala represented Mulanje North in the National Assembly of Malawi. In 2014 she stood as an independent but following the election she was one of about twenty MPs including Mary Maulidi Khembo, Naomi Maleso Akilekwa and Mary Livuza who decided to side with the Democratic Progressive Party.

In 2017 she spoke in parliament following its opening and the speech by President Peter Mutharika. She raised her concerns about the delay in the delivery of fertiliser as it was required for that year's crop.

She entered parliament again in 2019 but no party had a majority and the hung parliament may have led to slow decisions. The Democratic Progressive Party President Peter Mutharika appealed to independents like Tambala to support the government. 32 agreed including Tambala, Susan Dossi, Roseby Gadama and Nancy Chaola Mdooko.

== See also ==
- Politics of Malawi
