= Abigail Shariff =

Malawian politician

- Born: Zomba
- Occupation: politician
- Political party: independent

Abigail Shariff Bongwe is a Malawian parliamentarian who was elected in 2019 and 2025 in the Zomba Likangala constituency. She became the President of the Malawi national netball team in 2021. She and the rest of the netball executive committee resigned in May 2024.

== Life ==
Shariff was born in Zomba. Between 2007 and 2017 she was the treasurer of the Malawi national netball team. In 2019, she successfully stood as an independent in her city's Likangala constituency to be a member of parliament. She entered parliament but no party had a majority and the hung parliament may have led to slow decisions. The Democratic Progressive Party President Peter Mutharika appealled to independants like Shariff to support the government. 32 agreed including Shariff, Susan Dossi, Lyana Lexa Tambala, Roseby Gadama and Nancy Chaola Mdooko.

In 2021 she was elected to be the president of the Malawi national netball team replacing the previous President who withdrew her own nomination. She beat former netball player and captain Emma Chongwe who competed for the post, despite having complained of election irregularities. Shariff had to pass her own difficult route to election as she had at one point been barred by the previous committee's interpretation of the constitution.

In 2022, Shariff and Minister of Youth and Sports, Richard Chimwendo Banda, persuaded Monica Chakwera, the first lady of Malawi. to become the patron of the national netball team. Shariff believed that the first lady would be able to assist with the team's problems. The team suffers from a lack of funding particularly for domestic matches.

In May 2024 Shariff and the rest of the executive committee of the national netball team resigned. They had received a critical letter on behalf of affiliates who were disappointed with the rate of progress. The Sports Council were obliged to step in to provide support until a new committee could be appointed. A new committee was announced on 3 June 2024 led by interim president, Vitumbiko Gubuduza. Gududza used to play netball for the Cironets but she was then leading the Blantyre and District Netball body.

Shariff is a member of the Malawi Parliamentary Women's Caucus which in 2024 was led by Roseby Gadama.

In 2025 she was re-elected to represent Zomba Likangala with 73% of the vote.
