= Nyakyusa people =

Ethnic group from Mbeya Region of Tanzania and Northern Region of Malawi

The Nyakyusa (also called the Sokile) are a Bantu ethnolinguistic group who live in the mountains of southern Mbeya Region of Tanzania and the Northern Region of Malawi. They speak the Nyakyusa language, a member of the Bantu language family.

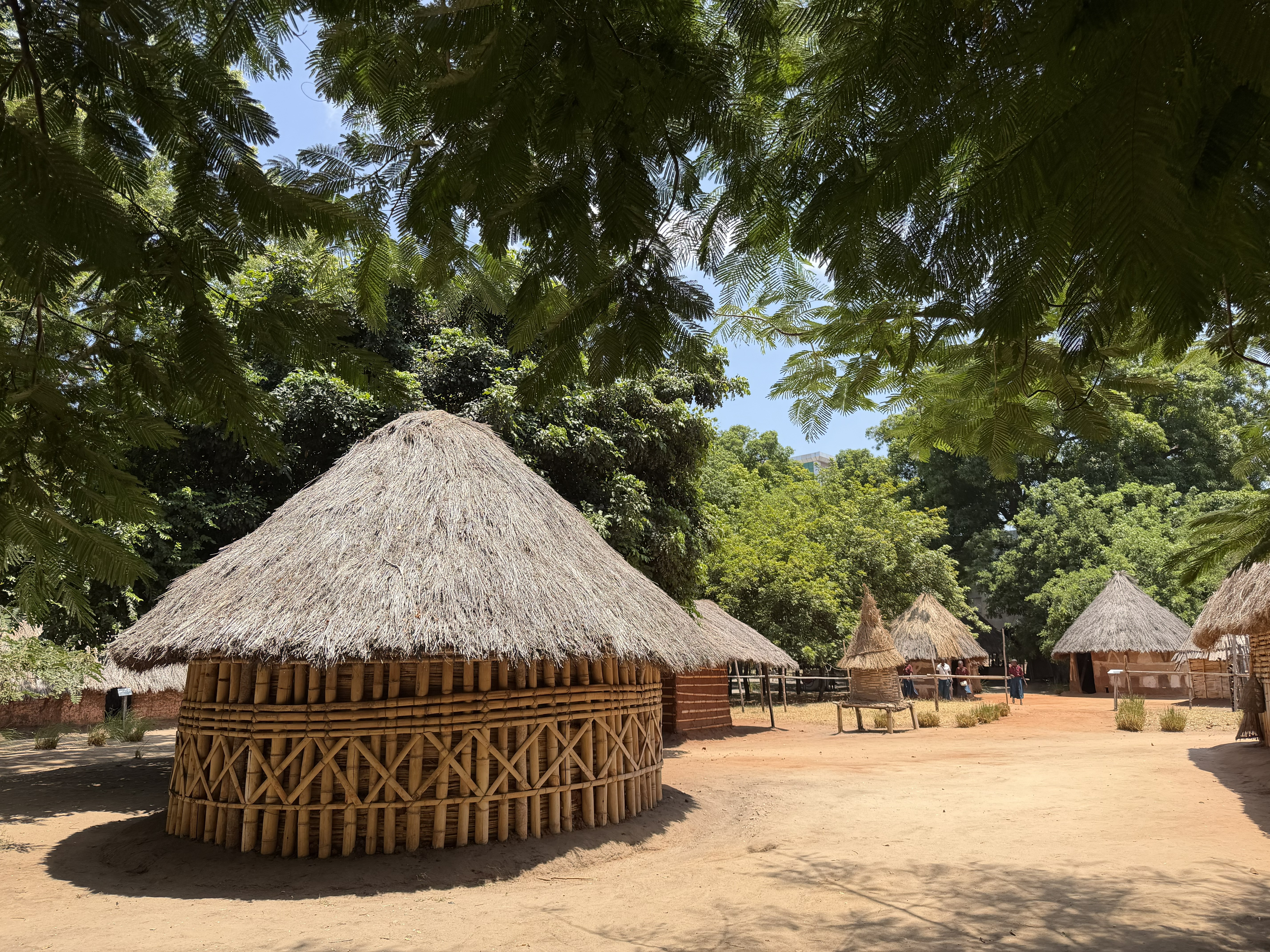
Traditional House of Nyakyusa Tribe.

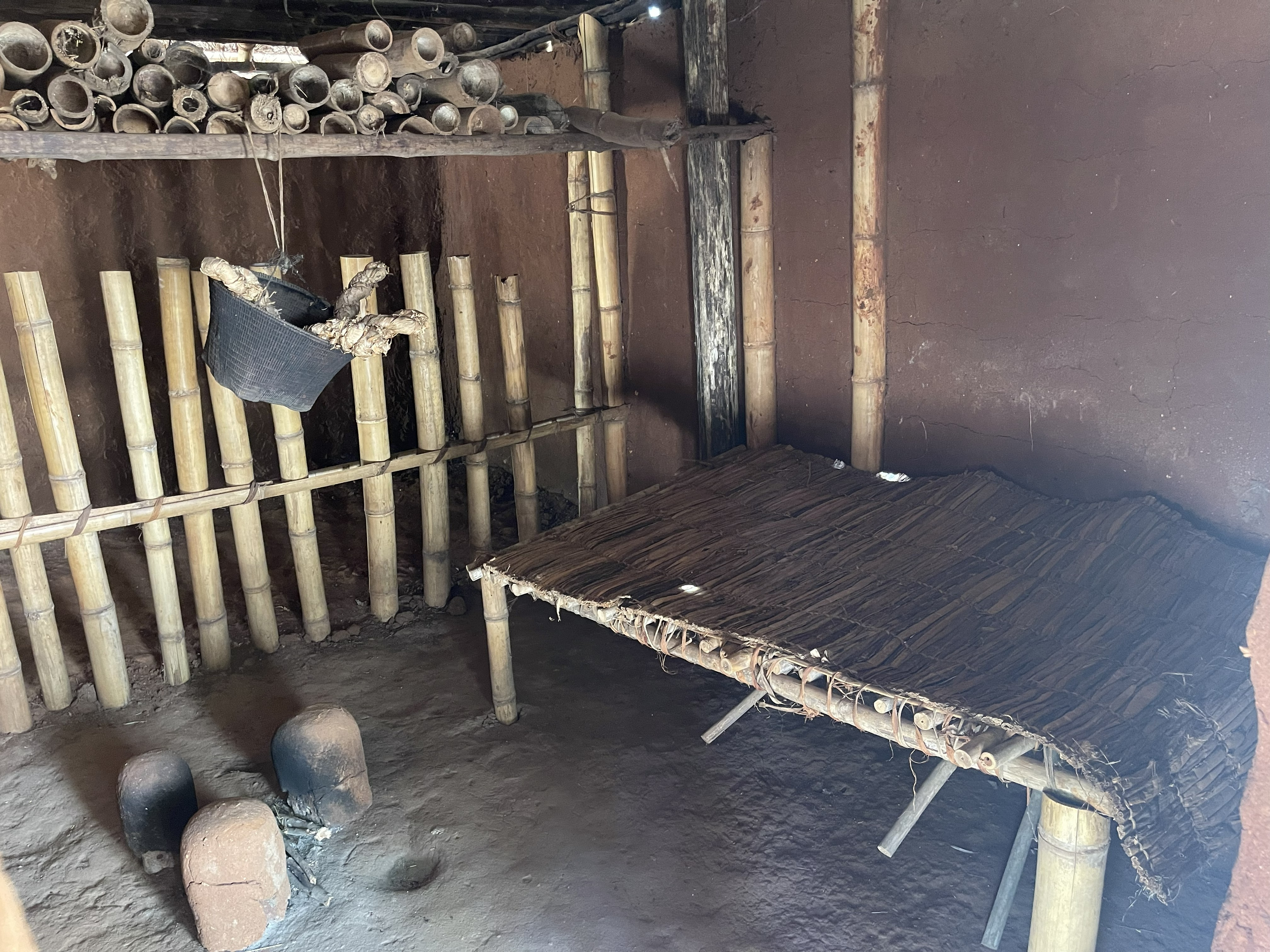
Inside of Traditional House of Nyakyusa Tribe.

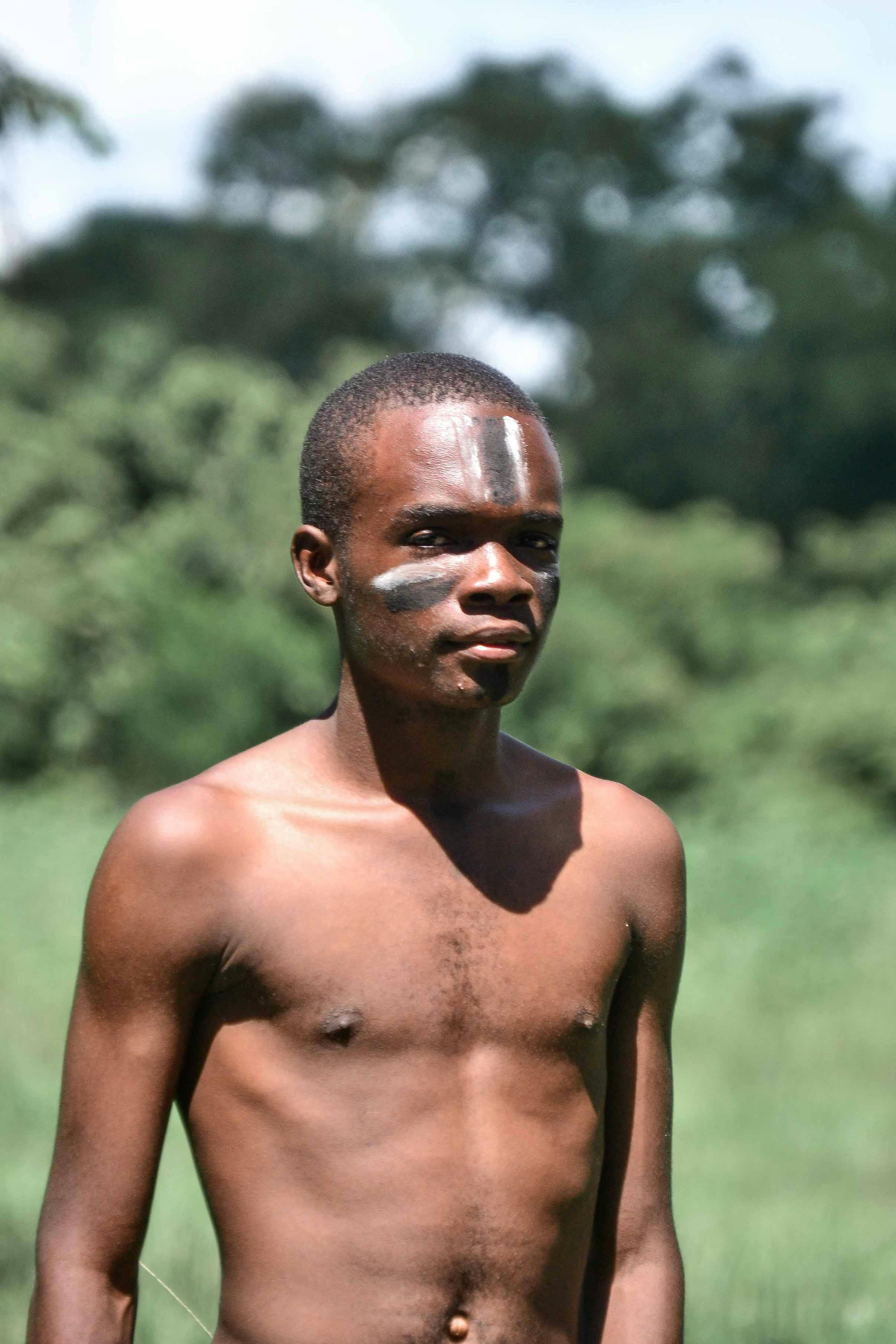
Nyakyusa man in Tanzania

== Belief system ==
The traditional god of the Nyakyusa people is called Kyala, which is the name for God in the Nyakyusa language.

== See also ==
- List of ethnic groups in Tanzania
- History of Tanzania
- History of Malawi
