= Roseby Gadama =

Malawian member of parliament

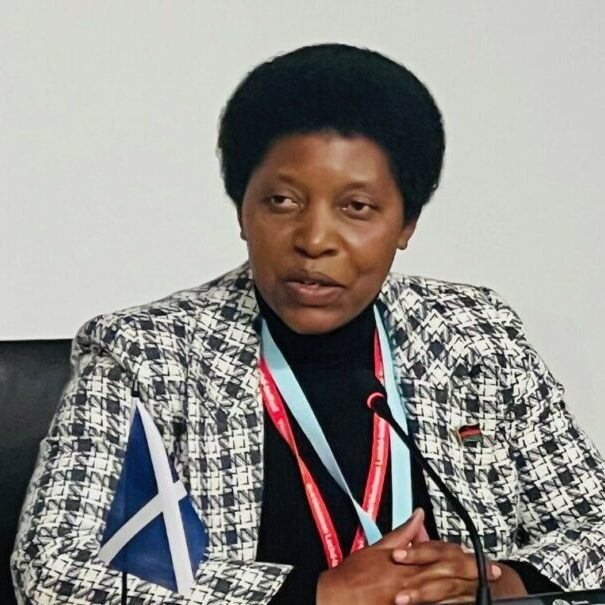
- in 2024
- Born: Mulanje
- Occupations: Librarian and Member of parliament
- Known for: Chair of the Malawi Parliamentary Women's Caucus
- Predecessor: Charles Joseph Tikhiwa
- Successor: incumbent
- Political party: Independent

Roseby Gadama became the Malawian member of parliament for Zomba Thondwe in 2019. She was the chair of the Malawi Parliamentary Women's Caucus and she sat on the Public Accounts Committee. She lost her seat in 2025.

== Life ==
Gadama was born in Mulanje in eastern Malawi.

She has a bachelor's degree in Library and Information Science and she has worked as a regional librarian for the National Library Service in Malawi. She contributed to organising Women Reading Clubs and other clubs for women based around baking, sewing and knitting.

She became the member of parliament for the Zomba Thondwe Constituency in the 2019 Malawian general election. She wanted to represent the Democratic Progressive Party, but she stood as an independent after protests involving tear gas and gunfire during the primaries. Some would have preferred a male candidate and that is who won the DPP's backing. At one point, six cars of police arrived, her car was hit with a bullet, but she had changed cars. Gadama was to later quote an academic study which confirmed that women are discriminated against in Malawi's primary elections.

When Gadama entered parliament then it appeared that no party had a majority and there was a hung parliament. The Democratic Progressive Party President Peter Mutharika appealed to independants, like Gadama, to support the government. 32 agreed including Gadama, Susan Dossi, Lyana Lexa Tambala, Ireen Mambala, Abigail Shariff and Nancy Chada.

She joined the Malawi Parliamentary Women's Caucus and she sat on the Public Accounts Committee.

In June 2023 she was at the "4 Million Kwacha" football sports event which she sponsors. In August she raised a proposal in parliament to ask the education department to review their uniform rules for primary aged students. She was concerned that the students, who sit on cold floors, are required to wear dresses or shorts. She want the students to be allowed to wear long trousers, irrespective of their gender, as a choice. Her proposal went against tradition, some said, but it went forward for consideration.

There was a prayer day in Thondwe on 10 October 2023 and Gadama announced that her parents were intending to fund an ambulance and she would donate a million kwacha.

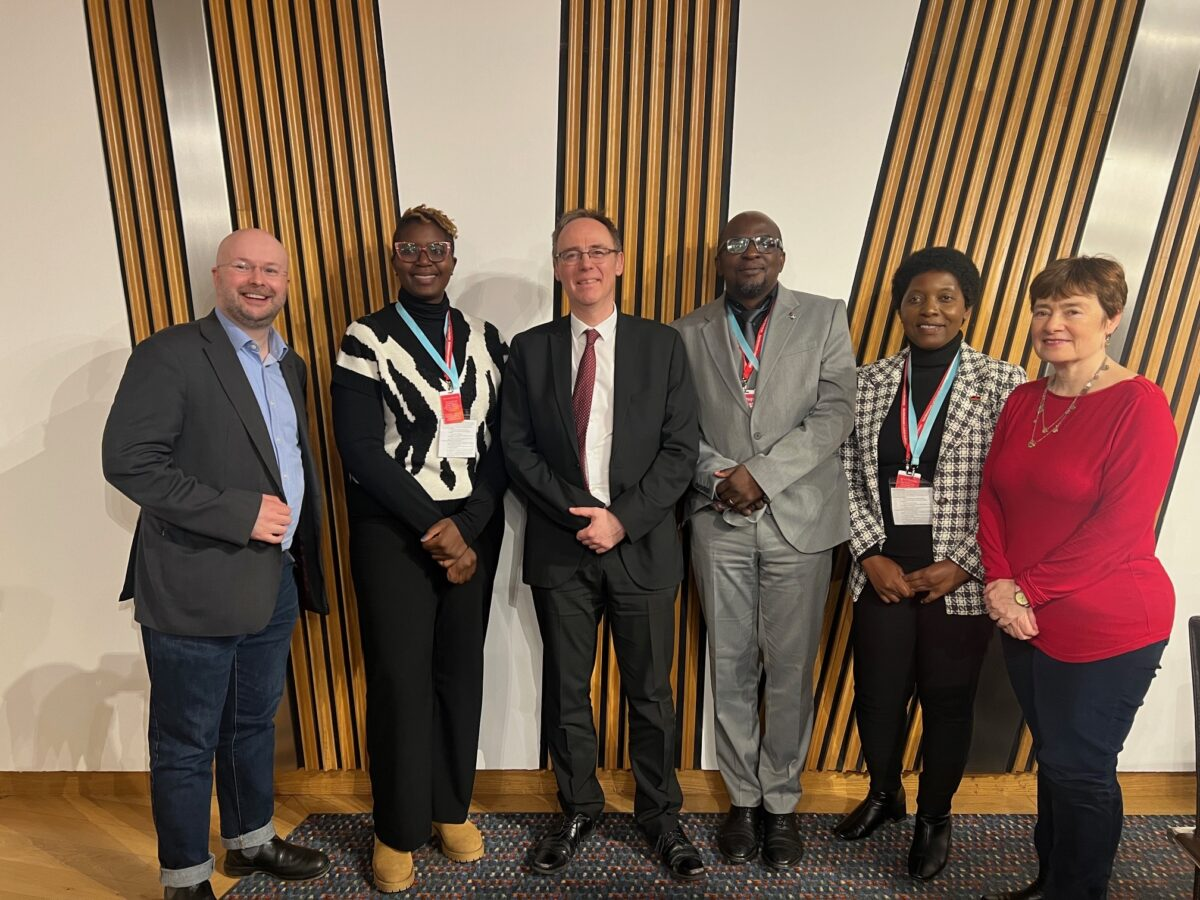
In Scotland with Patrick Grady MP, Chilufya Chileshe, Dr Alasdair Allan MSP, Viwemi Chavula, Gadama MP and Sarah Boyack MSP

Gadama is chair of the Malawi Parliamentary Women's Caucus and Malawi is one of the four countries on the Scottish government's priority list. During 2023 the Westminster Centre for Democracy and the Scottish National Party funded a study in collaboration with Gadama's Women's caucus. The study looked at the existing women MPs in the Malawian parliament, their stakeholders, their successes and the barriers they faced in Malawi's society. Each year the caucus's members have a three-day retreat to discuss progress and strategy. The 2023 retreat was in Mangochi and it was funded by the Scottish National Party, Oxfam, Centre for Civil Society Strengthening and the Westminster Foundation for Democracy.

Cyclone Freddy caused hundreds of deaths in Malawi and thousands were made homeless in early 2023. Damage was high in her constituency and appeals were made for assistance. Gadama took journalists around Thondwe to see the damage. A local bridge was re-built and it was opened by members of the Church of Central Africa Presbyterian who were celebrating their church's centenary.

In February 2024 Gadama visited Edinburgh and she and Chilufya Chileshe attended a meeting of the Scotland Malawi Partnership. Present were Scottish parliamentarians Alasdair Allan and Sarah Boyack and MP Patrick Grady. The meeting heard about Gadama's Women's Caucus, Malawi's Current Food Insecurity Crisis and Human Rights in Malawi.

Gadama was identified by Parliament's First Deputy Madalitso Kazombo as a "respectable female parliamentarian" together with Lilian Patel and Mary Mpanga in September 2024. Gadama lost her Zomba Thondwe constituency seat in the September 2025 election when she was beaten by Dumisani Lindani of the Democratic Progressive Party.
