= Archaeology of Malawi =

People first began to be interested in Malawi's prehistoric past in the 1920s. Excavations of sites in nearby countries, Tanzania and Zambia, made archaeologists believe that they might find the same type of material culture in Malawi. In the 1920s, a series of lacustrine deposits was found at the northwest end of Lake Malawi. These beds contained fragmentary fossils and were mapped by Dr. F. Dixey. These findings sparked an interest to excavate more locations in Malawi.

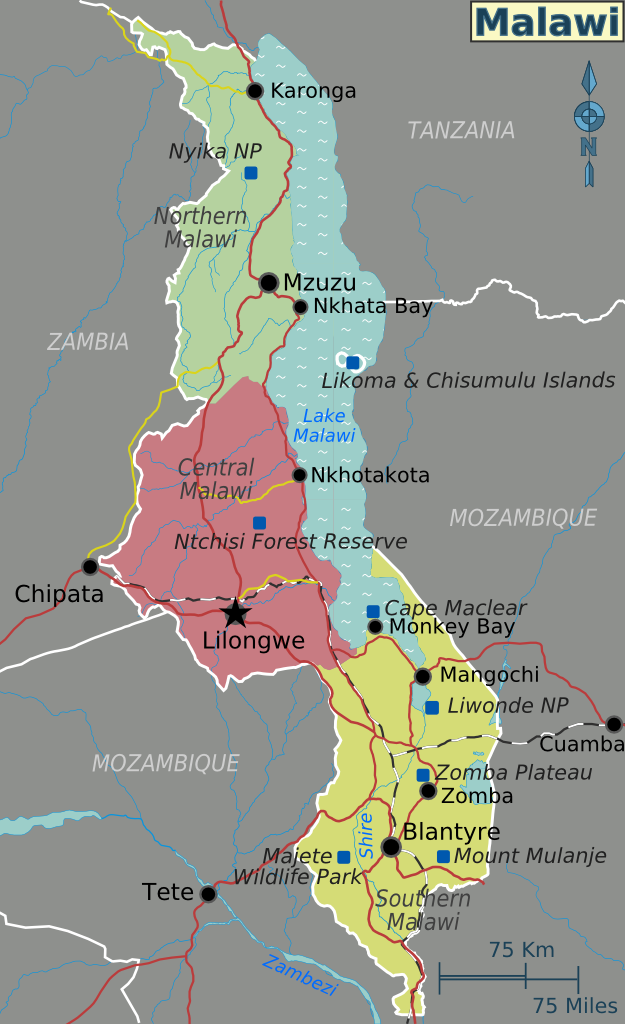
Map of Malawi with regions, major cities and other destinations noted

== Early Stone Age ==
=== Uraha ===
Uraha is an Early Stone Age site in Uraha Hill, northern Malawi. It is part of the Chiwondo Beds site which is where the fossil remains were found on the lake beds. It is known for the discovery of a jawbone of an ancient human dating to 2.4 million years ago. This specimen is one of the oldest occurrences of the genus Homo and is assumed to be of the species Homo rudolfensis. The recovery of this bone helped create a connection between sites of East and South Africa. There were no stone tools found but, animal fossils revealed a pattern of habitat change between about 4 and 1.5 million years ago when the land became more of a grassland.

== Middle Stone Age ==
=== Mwanganda's Village ===
Mwanganda's Village is one of the few Middle Stone Age archaeological sites in Malawi and it is found in Karonga. This site was first known for the findings of an elephant butchery site. At this site, archaeologists have found associated animal bones and stone artifacts. In Area 1 of the village, there was evidence of a single elephant carcass. The elephant bones were broken and dispersed into three main concentrations. These bones have been dated back to the late Middle or early Upper Pleistocene times. This evidence resulted in J. Desmond Clark's hypothesis about the site being a butchery site. Area 2 of the village contained evidence for other hunting activities, presumably on different occasions. Current research indicates that this site is not an elephant butchery site but evidence for successive colonization of riparian corridors by Middle Stone Age hunter-gatherers focused on exploiting localized resources during periods of humidity while other lakes dried up across Africa.

=== Chaminade I ===
Chaminade I (CHA-I) is an open-air, late Middle Stone Age site in Karonga, Malawi. It dates to 43,400 - 21,000 years ago and is one of only a few sites that date to that period in east-central Africa (the Democratic Republic of the Congo, Malawi, Mozambique, Zambia, and Zimbabwe). When the site was discovered, stone tools were eroding out of the ground; the site was excavated in 2011 which recovered phytoliths, pollens, and stone tools (including Levallois flakes and cores, casual flakes and cores, points, and blades) mostly made from fine-grained quartzite and coarse-grained quartz, but occasionally chert or other minerals. These artefacts and ecofacts have been analysed in order to understand what the site was used for and what it would have looked like at the time it was being used. Palaeoenvironmental reconstruction has revealed that the area would have been a savanna-woodland at the time it was used and relatively stable; resources would have been dependable and easy to access. This is an unusual phenomenon as during this time, north Africa was in a period of intense aridification. Most of the rocks that the stone tools were made from are local and some of the stone tools fit back together like puzzle pieces, suggesting that this was a workshop site where stone tools were made (rather than brought to the site from somewhere else). The specific methods used to make the stone tools are unusual for the time period. The uncharacteristic methods used to make stone tools in combination with the unexpectedly stable environment of the area indicates that this site was in a special area that did not require dramatic changes in stone tool technologies in order for people to survive there.

== Later Stone Age ==
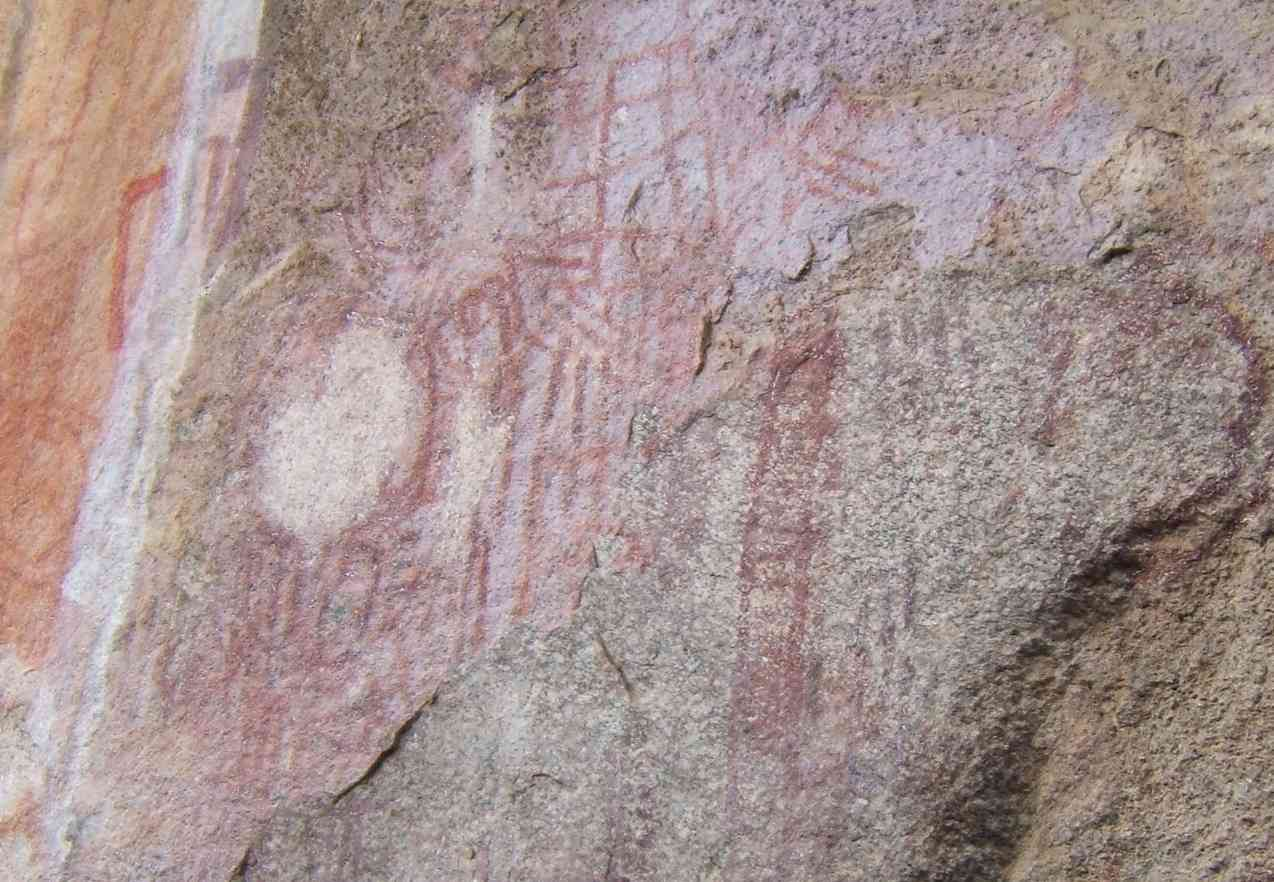
Rock art at the site of Mphunzi in the Chongoni Rock Art Area

The earliest Later Stone Age occurrences in Malawi are dated between 17,000 and 10,000 BP. Most of the Later Stone Age sites in Malawi are rock shelters, which is a pattern throughout Africa as well.

=== Chongoni Rock Art Area ===
The Chongoni Rock Art Area is located in the Central Region of Malawi consisting of 127 sites and possibly more. These sites have art depictions of rock art and paintings from the Later Stone Age and Iron Age.

==== Central African rock art traditions ====
The current understanding of Central African rock art is using Benjamin Smith's division of the art by certain characteristics. His analysis led him to divide the rock art into four traditions based on the certain motifs and symbols used within the art itself. The two red traditions listed belonged to the hunter-gatherers that continued to use Later Stone Age technology, such as microlithic tools. They became known as the BaTwa, they continued to use the same technology into the Iron Age. The two white traditions belonged to the Chewa people. This is known because the white traditions cover an area almost identical to the extent of spread of the modern Chewa people as well as the symbols used in the paintings are still used in their rituals today.

===== The Red Animal tradition =====
This tradition comprises the depiction of animals and human figures always in red. Animals are usually outlined and filled completely and tend to naturalistic in style. There is usually stylization that does not allow the viewer to recognize the species of the animal.

===== The Red Geometric tradition =====
This tradition comprises the depiction of simple geometric forms. Common shapes consist of circles, concentric circles, divided circles, ladders, lines, and parallel lines. Red and white pigments were used for painting but, the white has disappeared from most of the sites because of its momentary nature.

===== The White Zoomorphic tradition =====
This tradition was executed by finger-painting. It comprises stylized animals and human figures. The paintings are usually done in white but, sometimes they were done in charcoal. This art belongs to the Chewa men, it depicts masked men and animals from the ceremonies performed by the Nyau association at rites of passage including Chinamwali and funerals.

===== The White Spread-eagled tradition =====
This tradition is for the art that contained a figure that resembles a stretched hide. These figures almost always had snake-like motifs and other geometric designs like circles and lines of dots. The primary color used is white but, black and red paintings are also present. These figures are the works of Chewa women and the art was produced during the CHinamwali ceremonies which are performed when a girl is coming of age. The symbolism represents water and fertility.

This area is an UNESCO World Heritage Site because of the traditions of rock art and its continued link to the present society.

=== Mwana wa Chentcherere II ===
Mwana wa Chentcherere II rock shelter is one of the largest rock painting sites in Malawi, and was excavated by J. Desmond Clark in 1972. This site shows evidence as to how the hunter-gatherers persisted into the Iron Age. Many of the paintings were motifs for sexuality and fertility which shows a very intimate side of women that is not usually shown in the ancient times.

== Iron Age ==
Archaeological research of Malawi's Iron Age began in the mid-1960s by Keith Robinson. From 1968 to 1975, Robinson excavated many areas around southern Malawi and established an Iron Age archaeological sequence for Malawi. Comparing the pottery, they determined a new intermediate phase of ceramics proving there was continuity from the Early Iron Age to the Late Iron Age. Later Stone Age hunter-gatherers first occupied the area.

=== Cultures of the Iron Age ===
==== Nkope culture ====
Nkope is an Early Iron Age site located about 20 kilometers south of Monkey Bay and about 40 kilometers north of Mangochi. This site dates from about 250 to 1000 AD. The Nkope culture is defined mostly by its ceramics called Nkope ware. This pottery is usually thick for their size and has pronounced and decorated rims. The basic vessels are spherical pots with inverted rims and bowls with flattened and thickened rims. This pottery has a very wide distribution, being found in all of southern Malawi as well as parts of central and northern Malawi. It has also been found in areas of eastern Zambia and Mozambique. Most of the Nkope pottery sites are located along the shores of the southern tip of Lake Malawi and along the Shire River and its tributaries and the Namwera and Mulanje plateau areas.

==== Kapeni culture ====
The Kapeni culture is found on the banks of the Shire and dates to about 800 to 1100 AD. Kapeni ware is considered the earliest of the late Iron Age pottery since it closer related to the Nkope ware than other late Iron Age pottery. The Kapeni culture existed simultaneously with the Longwe culture and there has been evidence of it overlapping with the Nkope culture in some locations as well.

==== Longwe culture ====
The Longwe culture has been inadequately researched. Since Longwe pottery resembled Mawudzu pottery, it was originally classified as Mawudzu ware. When more of the same pottery was found, it was given its present name. Longwe culture dates to about 1000 AD and in some areas of the country, existing the same time as the Kapeni culture. This culture can be found north and east of the Mulanje Massif, in the lower Shire area, one the Ntaja-Namwera hills and the Shire highlands. At many of the sites, stone tools were found so it is believed that the people of the Longwe culture are hunter-gatherers, but they still produced ceramics.

==== Mawudzu culture ====
The Mawudzu culture is named after the Mawudzu Hill site in the lakeshore area and dates from 1200 to 1750 AD. This culture is also mainly defined by its ceramics. The Mawudzu pottery is very distinct and it is unlikely to have evolved from either the Kapeni or the Nkope wares. Radiocarbon dating places this pottery to the twelfth century AD, which was a time where Kapeni pottery was no longer in use and Longwe pottery was being phased out. It is thought that Chewa-speaking people may have introduced the Mawudzu pottery. Despite the lack of early Iron Age features on the pottery, the distribution patterns of Mawudzu sites is similar to that of the early Iron Age people. Later on, Mawudzu inhabitants spread to cover more parts of southern Malawi. In these southern sites, there is more evidence of dependence on cultivation and rearing of cattle.

==== Nkhudzi culture ====
Nkhudzi pottery was first recorded at Nkhudzi Bay and is distinct from the earlier types of pottery mentioned above. Its introduction into Malawi is said to be a result of long-distance trade in about eighteenth century AD. The distribution sites of Nkhudzi sites are similar to those of Mawudzu sites. Most sites are located in areas of fertile land and close to water sources. Archaeological evidence indicates that Nkhudzi settlements were very large. Farming, rearing of cattle and smelting of iron were the main economic activities of this culture.

=== Mankhamba ===
Mankhamba is a Late Iron Age settlement site in southern Malawi and former capital of the Maravi empire. Some of the artifacts recovered at the site include local and imported ceramics, lithics, iron and copper objects, beads, and faunal remains.

==== Ceramics ====
- Pottery- The local pottery has been identified as many Mawudzu and Nkhudzi pottery. The Mawudzu pottery consisted mostly of deep, hemispherical bowls and Nkhudzi pottery consisted of thistle-shaped pots and open bowls. There was also a few sherds that belonged to Early Iron Age communities.
- Pipe- Eighty fragments resulting in a minimum of 68 smoking pipes were recovered at this site. This is the largest collection of smoking pipes were recovered at an Iron Age site in Malawi.
- Spindle whorls- One complete and five fragmentary spindle whorls were recovered, all of them had evidence of use-related wear.

==== Stone artifacts ====
- Grinding stones
- Utilized stones- Seven of the eight utilized stones were water-rolled pebbles, four were used for hammering, three were probably nkhulungo, smooth stones that women use to polish or smooth house floors after they add more dirt. The last stone had soot consistent with use as a firestone.

==== Iron objects ====
There was evidence for Iron-smelting at the site consisting of large amounts of iron slag and tuyere pipes. The open nature of the site exposed many of the artifacts to be severely corroded, making it difficult to identify many of the tools. The ones that have been identified consists of hoes, axes, spears, arrows, and razors.

==== Copper objects ====
This site also has the largest assemblage of copper objects ever recovered at an Iron Age site in Malawi. Copper objects were well preserved and are easily identifiable. The most common objects were needles, wires, fish hooks, rings, and rods which were obviously used for fishing. There was also ornaments that consisted of necklaces, rings, and bangles.

==== Faunal remains ====
At this site, there are remains of both domestic and wild animals, including fish and gastropods. The people targeted large and medium-sized bovids more than the small ones. The most common being impalas, buffalos and elephants. A majority of them had chop marks that are consistent with ivory-working. The domesticated animals included cattle, sheep/goats, pigs, dogs, chickens, and dove/pigeons. Over 30% of the bone specimens were burnt and had green coloration due to the contact of the copper objects.

== Other Malawian archaeological sites ==
- Mbande Hill
- Mankhamba
