= Kaphirintiwa =

Hill and sacred site in Malawi

Kaphirintiwa Hill

Highest point
- Elevation: 1,249 m (4,098 ft)
- Coordinates: 14°29′00″S 33°56′00″E

Geography
- Location: Angónia District, Mozambique

Kaphirintiwa is a hill in the Dzalanyama range on the border of Malawi and Mozambique. It is a sacred site in Chewa traditional religion, believed to be the location where Chiuta (God) created all humans and animals, and there is a pattern of seemingly human and animal footprints in the rock. Samuel Josia Ntara translated Kaphirintiwa as "the hill that leaves traces behind".

== Creation myth ==
The Chewa creation myth holds that all animals were created by Chiuta (God) at Kaphirintiwa, where there is a pattern of seemingly human and animal footprints in the rock. A summary of the tradition follows: Chiuta first sent a man and woman from the sky to Kaphirintiwa with a hoe, grain mortar, and winnowing basket, along with pairs of other animals. Chiuta also joined them, accompanied by rain which produced greenery in the previously-barren land. Humans began cultivating the land, and they are said to have lived peacefully with animals and Chiuta until they created fire by rubbing two sticks together. This set the grass on fire, causing animals to flee and hate humans, while Chiuta was saved by a spider spinning a string which he used to return to the sky. Chiuta then stated that humans would die and ascend to the sky, where they would have to make rain clouds to put out the fires.

According to Matthew Schoffeleers and Adrian Roscoe, it is one of the oldest creation myths in Central Africa, and other scholars thought that it may have originated with hunter-gatherers. In Malawian schools, students are taught to interpret the myth and infer what it says about the traditional Chewa worldview and Chewa cultural values.

== Sacred site and shrine ==
Oral traditions mention an ancient hunter-gatherer settlement at Kaphirintiwa, which has been confirmed by archaeological research. Tradition holds that Kaphirintwa was the home of the oldest rainmaking shrine (kachisi) in Central Africa, built on an ancient Batwa settlement. The Pre-Maravi Chewa first arrived in modern-day Malawi between the 12th and 14th centuries, led by a priestess named/titled Makewana. Makewana's shrine at Kaphirintiwa (dedicated to the god Chisumphi) was considered the "mother of all shrines", which were also located atop hills and headed by Makewana's Matsano ("spirit wives"), and Jan Vansina considered this system to constitute a state. A sacred pool located near Makewana's shrine played a key role in rainmaking ceremonies, and she was said to enter it for several days when calling for rain. The Maravi Chewa arrived in modern-day Malawi later, and tradition says that their leader (the Kalonga; "king") attempted to conquer Makewana's shrine at Kaphirintiwa, but it was fiercely defended and difficult to reach. In his defeat, he accepted Makewana as the supreme ritual authority in the Maravi state. In the 14th or 15th century, the shrine was moved from Kaphirintiwa to Msinja (the Pre-Maravi's principal settlement) at the foot of the hill, which Yusuf Juwajeyi says was possibly because there was no longer any threat.

There is a sacred pool and forest on the path 2 km (1.2 mi) from Kaphirintiwa which are called "the gateway". Traditionally people are expected not to have washed, shaved, or had sexual relations seven days before their visit. Past the gateway, people follow a long path upwards. Juwayeji says that the journey to Kaphirintiwa took him 4 hours of uphill walking. At the top is a sacred forest called Kasitu wherein the shrine was initially located. Though the shrine's exact location has been forgotten, a traditional custodian still looks after the area, and there is a sacred pool nearby. Just below Kasitu is the rock formation that resembles footprints. The Kaphirintiwa shrine was also the home of a sacred drum called mbiriwiri which was said to have been dropped by the Batwa when they were displaced. It is now located at a shrine in a nearby village called Tsang'oma (also the title of the drum's traditional custodian).
