= Chongoni Rock Art Area =

Region of ancient paintings in Malawi

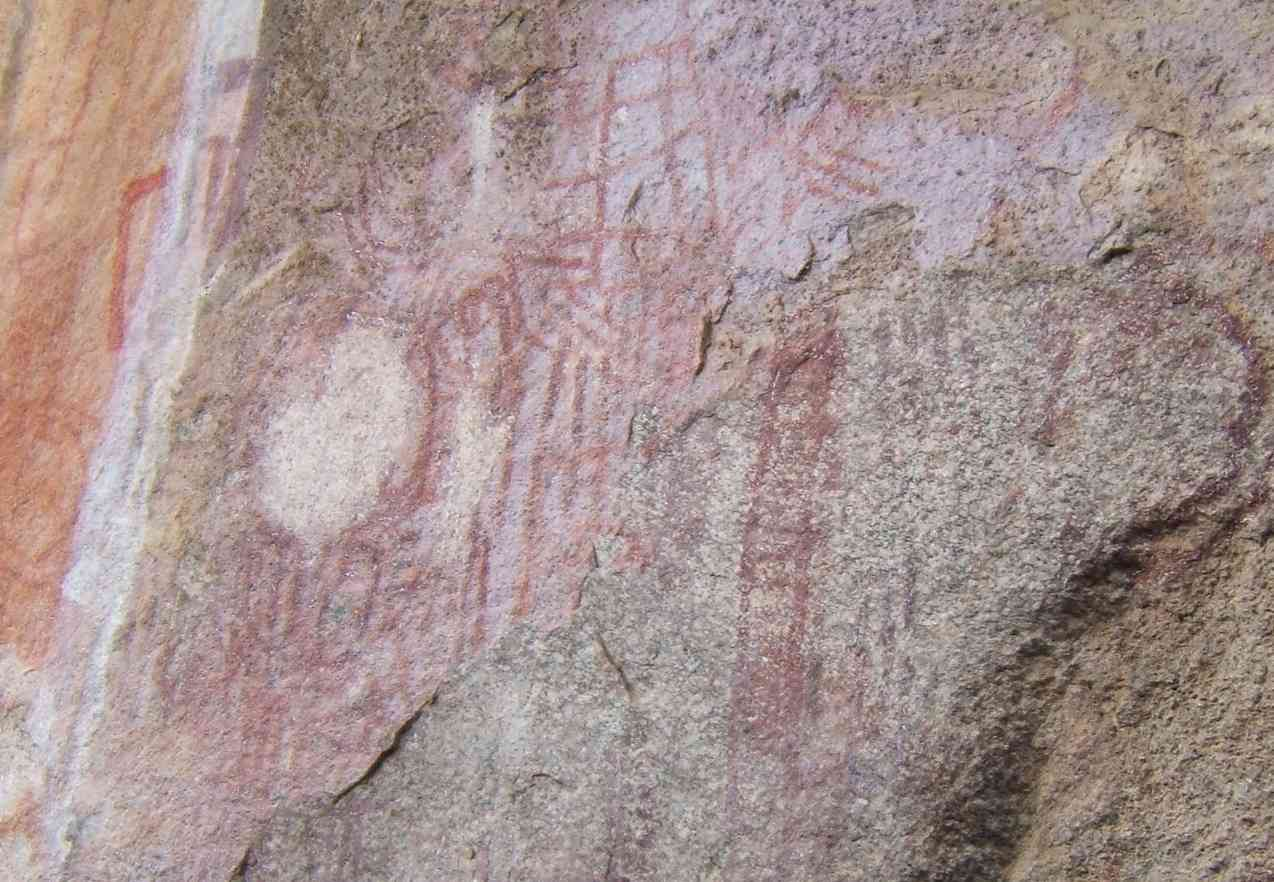
- Rock painting in Chongoni Rock Art Area

- Location within Malawi Location within Africa
- Location: Dedza District, Central, Malawi
- Nearest town: Dedza
- Coordinates: 14°17′36″S 34°16′45″E
- Area: 126.40 km^{2} (48.80 sq mi)
- Established: July 12, 2006

UNESCO World Heritage Site
- Type: Cultural
- Criteria: iii, vi
- Designated: 2006 (30th session)
- Reference no.: 476rev
- Region: Africa

The Chongoni Rock Art Area is a region containing 127 rock art and painting sites depicting the farmer community of the Late Stone Age and Iron Age, located in the forested hills of the Malawi plateau in the Central Region of Malawi.

The rock arts are in granite formations and consist of art depictions attributed to the hunter gatherer community of BaTwa who lived here during the stone age period, and of the farming community of Chewa who are traced to the Iron Age period. In view of this cultural importance, the area was inscribed as a UNESCO World Heritage Site in 2006 under Criteria III for the rich cultural traditions of rock art and Criteria VI for its continued link to present society. The rock art symbolizing rituals and ceremonies is mostly the creation of the women of Chewa clan. The "agropastoralist" art form of the tribes, which represents their perception of use and control of their natural habitat, was continued by the Bantu tribes in Chongoni.

== Geography ==
The rock art sites are near the mountainous region of Dedza (1,600 metres (5,200 ft)) which is the highest town in Malawi (about (80 kilometres (50 mi)) south-east of Lilongwe) which was settled during pre-historic times. It is reported to be the “densest cluster of rock art” in Central Africa. The 127 sites identified in the Malawi plateau are spread over an area of 126.4 square kilometres (48.8 sq mi). Located on the hill slopes of the forested area, the projecting rocks provide protection to the rock art sites. Of the 127 sites, five are outside the demarcated limits of the Chongoni Forest Reserve.

== Legal status ==
The rock art and archaeological sites of Chongoni are protected under The Monuments and Relics Act of 1990. The Chongoni Forest Reserve, declared a protected area under the Forestry Act of 1997, provides further protection as it encompasses most of the rock art sites.

== History ==
Archaeological antiquaries of the early Stone Age period found in the area provides links to the Upper Pleistocene. Artifacts dated to 2,500 BP have also been found establishing a Late Stone Age habitation of the site by hunter gatherers who are credited with creation of some of this rock art.

Iron Age settlements are traced from 1st millennium AD when a white rock art form, consisting of natural figures made with white clay, was depicted by the farmers. The farming community and the hunter gatherers worked in unison until the 19th century when the latter group were subsumed into the farming group.

It was in the 15th century that the Maravi group (after whom the country is named as Malawi) migrated from the northwestern region of Lubaland, unified all the groups and established the Maravi Empire. Then followed the Ngoni people who fled from South Africa and settled in the southern region of the Chongoni area. This resulted in the local Nyau people, who were opposed to the Ngoni, move to hiding places. It is this Nyau community, in spite of opposition from the Ngoni, the missionaries and the colonial administration of the country, who have ensured preservation of their culture. After the area was declared a Forest Reserve in 1924 and boundaries of villages demarcated, the first rock art finding was reported in the 1930s, and later in 1950s details of a few sites were published. Five rock art sites out of the total 127 sites were then declared in 1969 as protected national monuments. They were also opened to viewing by the public.

== Features ==
Following migration of Chewa agriculturalists into the area, white clay was the medium used for painting while their predecessors, BaTwa Pygmies, had the tradition of using red colour in their paintings. This tradition is in vogue even now and is connected with rituals for women's initiation, to usher rain and for other funerary related rites. The rock art also serves as a symbol of the Chewa secret society of the Nyau people.

The rock art sites are categorized under four traditions, two belong to the BaTwa Pygmies, the earliest community of hunter gatherers, the agriculturists, the Ngoni invaders, and the colonizers.

Details of three of the sites which are open to the public are: The Chentcherere Rock Art Site forming the core area where six rock shelters are located in the Chentcherere hills, described as in the "schematic and naturalistic" styles; the Namzeze Rock Art Site which consists of paintings in red geometrical pattern and several paintings in white colour; and the Mphunzi Rock Art Site which are "zoomorphism" paintings.

== Gallery ==
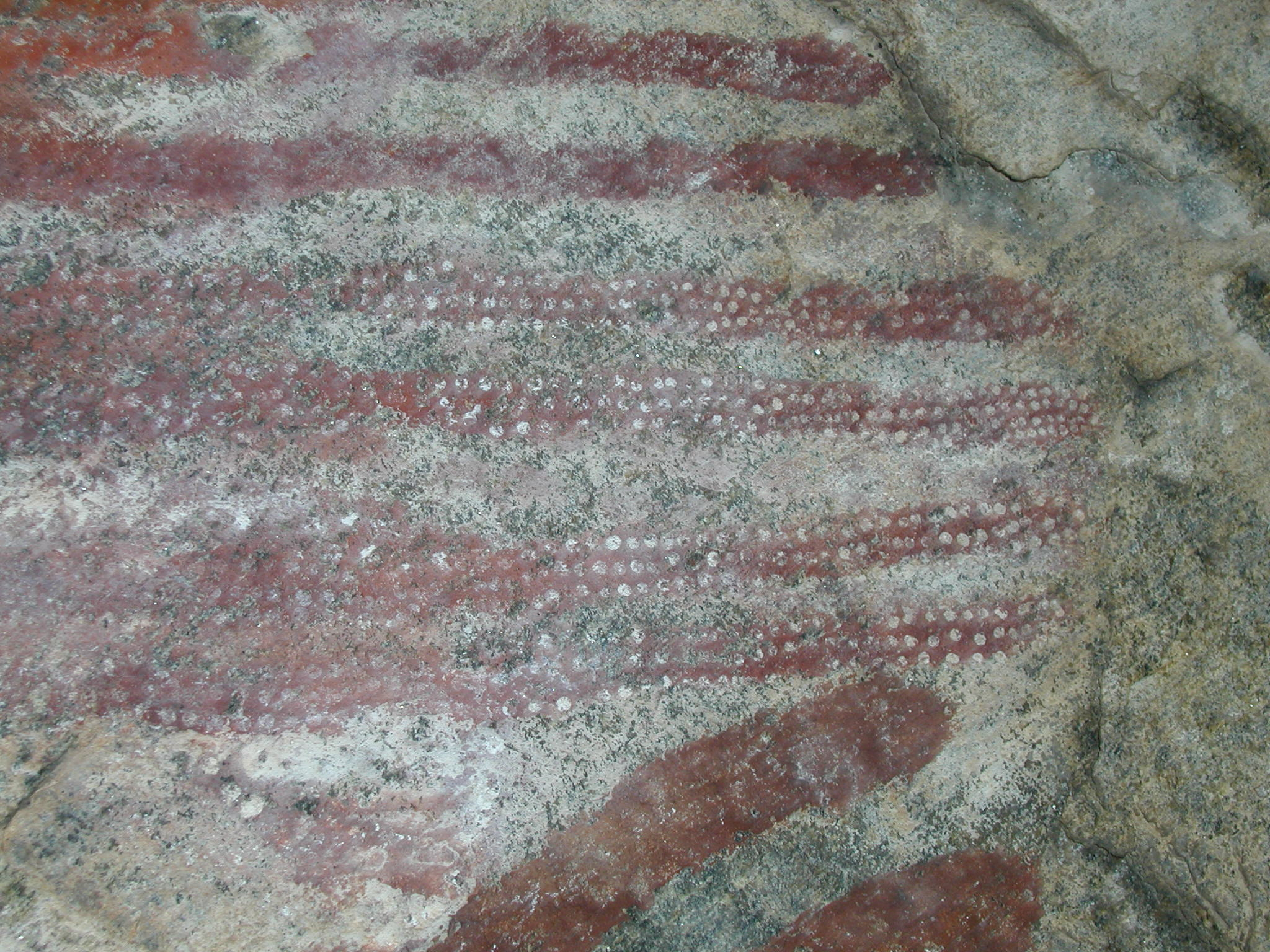
Red stripe painting

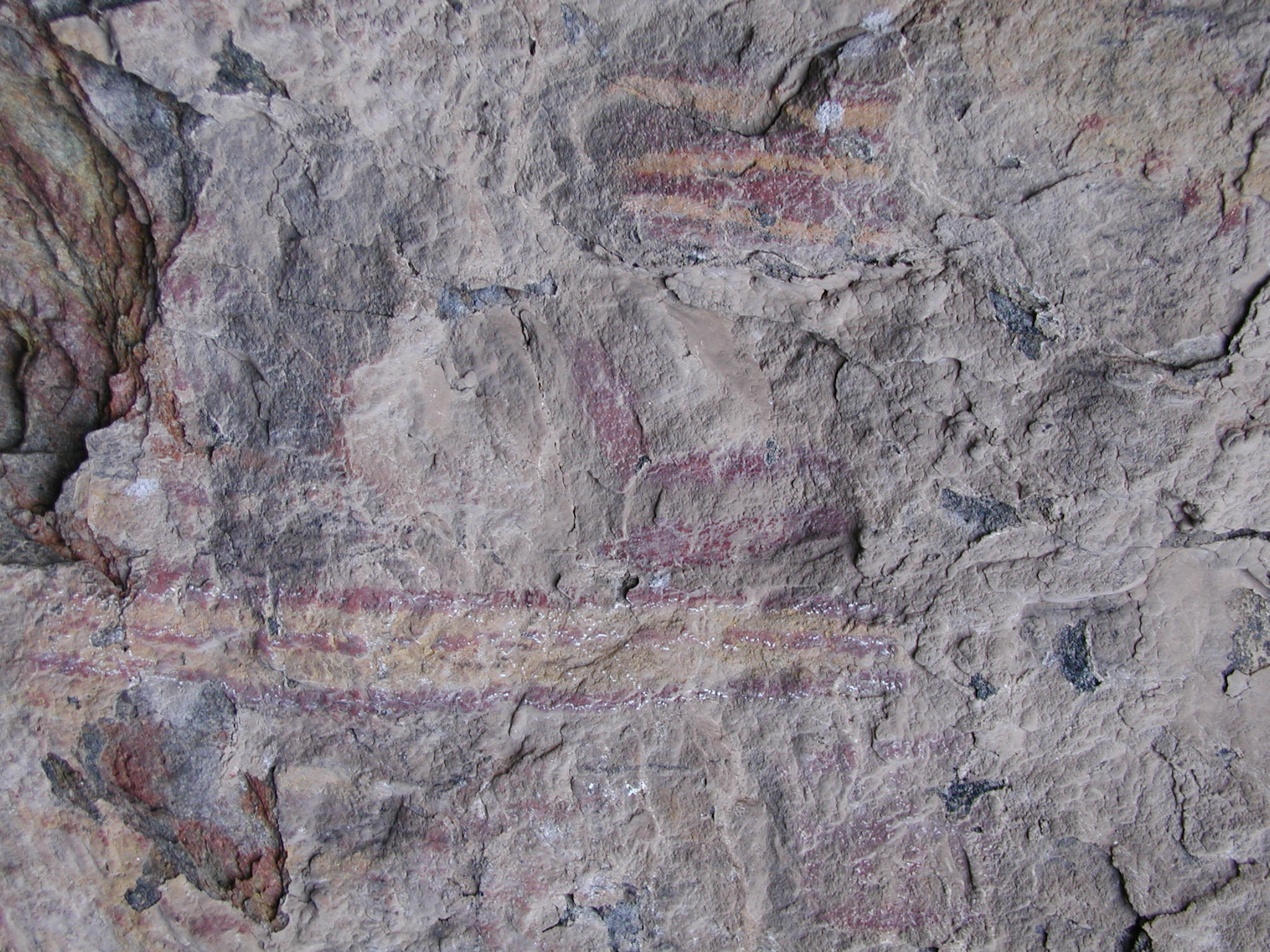
Red animals painting

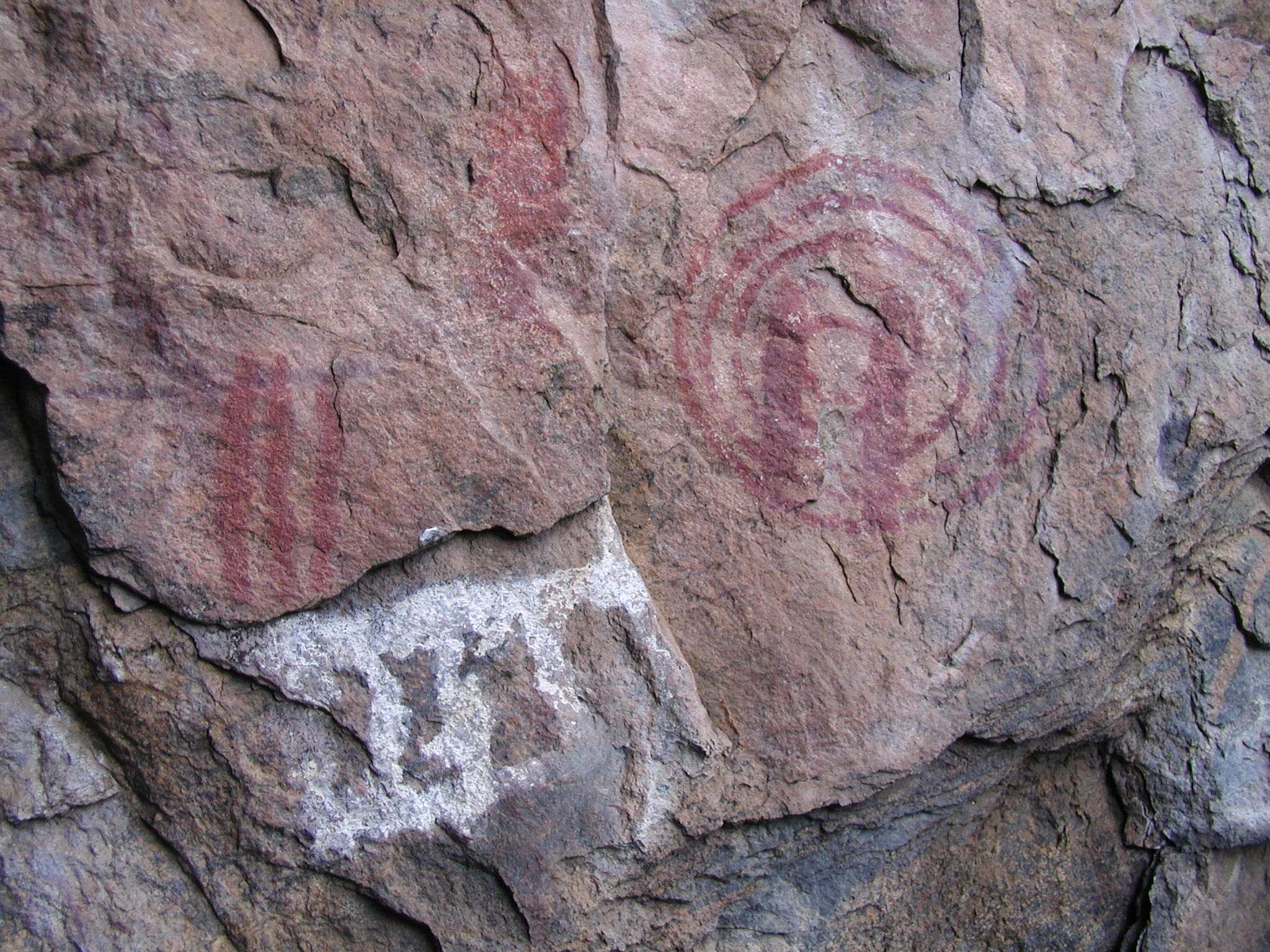
Red spiral with white animals

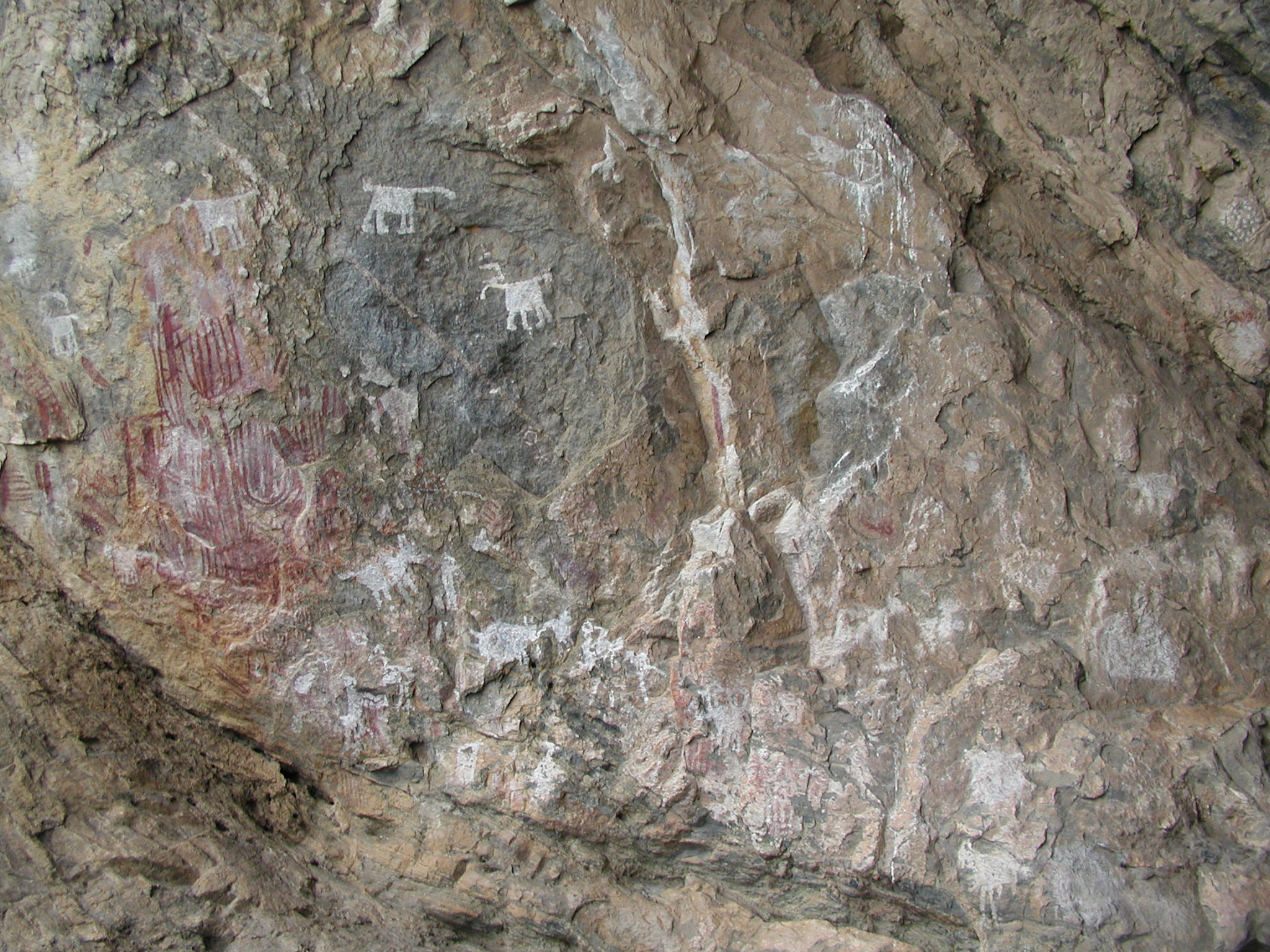
Field of white animals

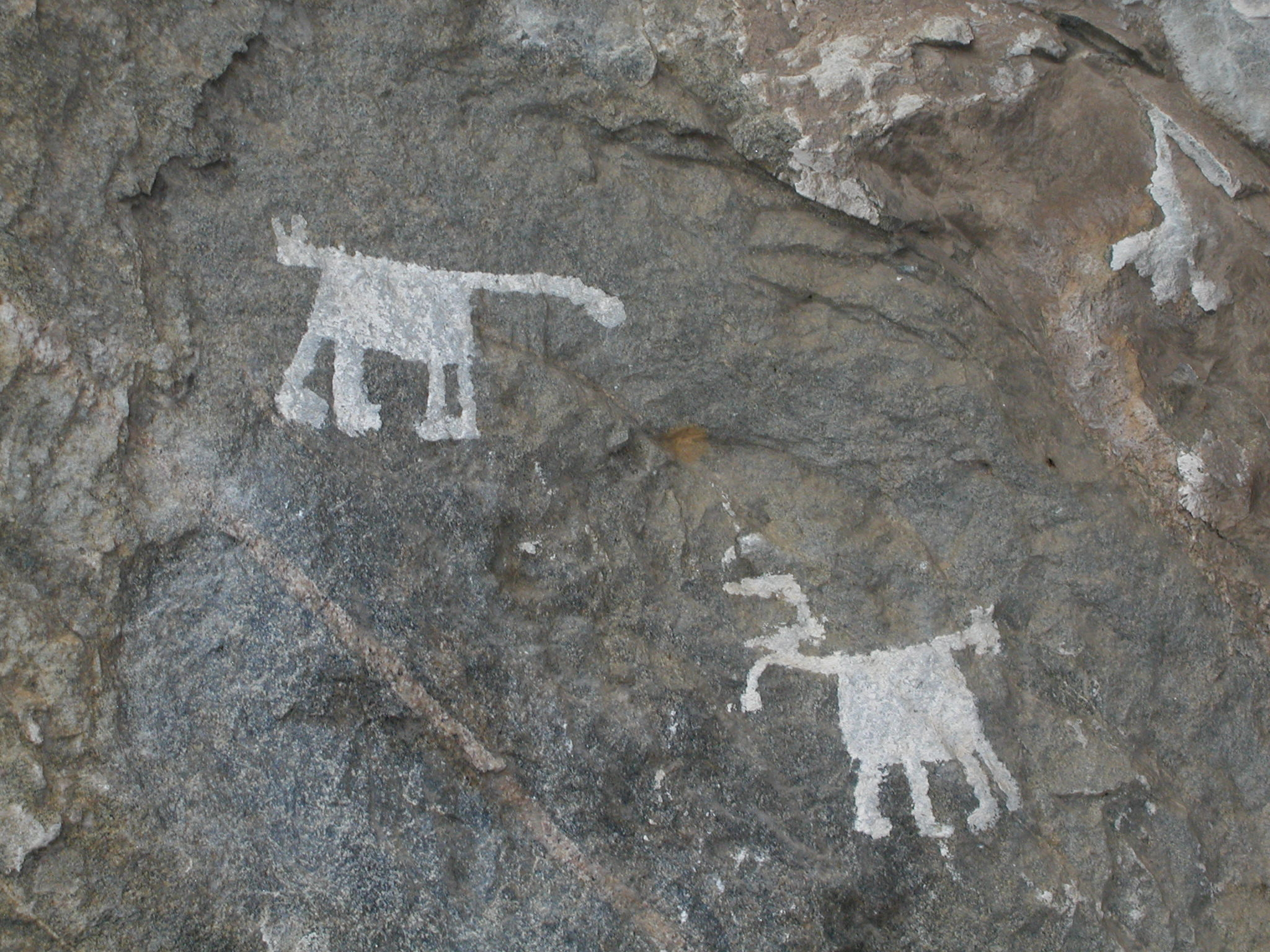
Detail of white animals

== See also ==
- Dedza District
- Dedza
