= Jan Matthew Schoffeleers =

Dutch academic

Matthew Schoffeleers

Professor of Anthropology of Religion, Free University Amsterdam,
- In office 1980–1988

Personal details
- Born: Jan Mathijs Schoffeleers; August 31, 1928 Geverik, South Limburg, Netherlands
- Died: April 4, 2011 (aged 82) Maastricht, Limburg (Netherlands)
- Resting place: Schimmert, Limburg (Netherlands)
- Parent(s): Willem Joseph Schoffeleers, Anna Christina Sophia Gijzen
- Relatives: four sisters, three brothers
- Education: St Catherine's College, Oxford
- Occupation: Anthropologist
- Known for: The study of African religions

Jan Mathijs Schoffeleers (1928–2011), who published many of his works in English as Jan Matthew Schoffeleers or Matthew Schoffeleers was a Dutch missionary and member of the Montfort Fathers order who became an important figure in African research as an anthropologist of African religion, particularly that in Malawi, where he spent around 16 years, first as a missionary and then as a lecturer. He continued his academic career later as reader and professor in religious anthropology in the Netherlands, continuing to concentrate on African themes.

== Early life and ordination ==
Schoffeleers was born on 31 August 1928, the eldest son of a farming family in the small village of Geverik, near the town of Beek, in the province of South Limburg in the southeast Netherlands. At that time, this was strongly Roman Catholic region, and education beyond the elementary level was directed toward religious careers. Schoffeleers was encouraged by his family to become a priest, and he began his secondary education in a so-called “small seminary” in Schimmert, which combined an education in the humanities with religious training, at the age of 14 in 1942, and he already had the intention of becoming a missionary. In 1949, he joined the seminary of the missionary congregation of Montfort at Oirschot as a brother and, after training in theology, he was ordained as a priest in that order in March 1955.

== Activities in Malawi ==
In 1955, Schoffeleers was sent as a missionary priest to Nyasaland, as Malawi was then known, and spent over two years based near Thyolo, where he witnessed an initiation ceremony soon after his arrival, which stimulated his interest in local religious customs. From 1958, he was based in the Lower Shire Valley, where he remained for five years. Here, he found it difficult to convert local people to the Roman Catholic faith because of the activities of the local M'Bona Cult and the masked Nyau society. Schoffeleers spent much of his time investigating the M’Bona martyr cult and Nyau society, although the latter in particular was strongly anti-Christian. This led him into conflict with his religious superiors, and Schoffeleers began to redefine himself as an anthropologist rather than a missionary.

At the end of over seven years in Malawi without a holiday, Schoffeleers was entitled to a sabbatical to study: he wished to study anthropology, but to do so without leaving Africa. At that time, the Catholic university Lovanium University at Kinshasa in the Democratic Republic of the Congo offered an anthropology course aimed at missionaries, and Schoffeleers studied there in the academic year 1963–1964. At the end of his first academic year, he returned to Malawi to undertake further fieldwork on the M’Bona cult.

The deteriorating security situation in the Congo prevented his return to Kinshasa, so he transferred to the University of Oxford in 1966, joining St Catherine's College to study Social anthropology and, after gaining his B. Litt degree in June 1966, he registered for a D. Phil degree and returned to Malawi for further study of the M’Bona cult, masked societies and spirit possession in the south of that country. After intensive fieldwork in Malawi, where he supported himself through part-time teaching, Schoffeleers returned to Oxford in January 1968 and wrote his thesis examining the M’Bona cult, the Nyau society and spirit possession cults based on his fieldwork in the Lower Shire Valley over the next nine months. He later recalled that he wanted to study anthropology to understand Africans better, but the knowledge he gained also gave him a new perspective on religion.

Immediately after receiving his doctorate, Schoffeleers returned to Malawi, and from 1968 to 1971 he taught in a Catholic seminary there. However, his attempts to Africanise the Roman Catholic liturgy and sacraments were opposed by the Catholic archbishop of Malawi, and he resigned from the seminary in 1971 to take up a post as Senior lecturer in Social Anthropology at the University of Malawi, based in Zomba, a post he retained until 1976. Schoffeleers later said that he left Malawi because the increasingly repressive regime of Hastings Banda had imprisoned some university students and was causing others to leave the country, so he saw no point in remaining there.

== Later academic career ==
In 1976, Schoffeleers was appointed Reader in the Anthropology of Religion at the Free University Amsterdam, and became a full professor in 1980. He also served as deputy chairman on the board of the African Studies Centre, Leiden. During his time in Amsterdam, he worked as an assistant priest in the city and, although still a member of the Montfort order, he had little contact with it. During his time at the Free University, he encouraged his colleagues to make more international contacts and to publish their work in English to reach a wider audience. However, by 1988, Schoffeleers found the increasing workload and changes to the anthropology curriculum had made that department less attractive, so he resigned.

In 1989, he was awarded a personal chair as Professor of Religious Anthropology at Utrecht University, and remained there until his retirement in 1998 at the age of 70.

== Research interests ==
=== Religious anthropology ===
Schoffeleers saw his main task as an anthropologist was to give a scholarly account of the religious life of the Malawian Mang'anja people, a subdivision of the Maravi cluster of peoples. Instead of adopting the perspective of a detached observer, he attempted to understand the basis of the spirituality and religious practices of the local population, and to analyse the M’Bona cult in the context of similar cults. As well as recording the present-day organisation and ceremonies of the cult, Schoffeleers identified M’Bona as a martyr, an historical person who had lived several centuries before the present, and whose story could be recovered from accounts he recorded in the 1960s. He did, however, accept that certain martyr motifs originated as borrowings from Christian theology after many Mang'anja were converted to Christianity in the early 20th century by Catholic missionaries. The cult had then begun to see M'Bona as a prophet and martyr, the black parallel of Jesus, saviour of black people as Jesus is for whites.

Schoffeleers considered that the M’Bona cult almost certainly originated around 1600, and was connected to the rise of a dynasty of paramount chiefs with the title Lundu. In his view, the first Lundu combined both political and religious power, the latter through his role in rain-making rituals. Various versions of M’Bona’s story recorded, that when the Lundu was unable to bring rain at a time of severe drought, he saw the success of his sister’s son, M’Bona, in creating plentiful rainfall as a challenge to his authority. Lundu then ordered the killing of M’Bona, who escaped from the Lundu’s capital and fled to the Lower Shire Valley where he was killed. Schoffeleers linked the place of his death an earlier rain shrine at Khulubvi that the first Lundu had destroyed as a possible rival centre of power, and did not exclude the possibility that the historical M’Bona was a priest there, killed when Lundu destroyed that shrine. He notes that a central cult rituals is the periodic rebuilding of the shrine, which he believed commemorated its earlier restoration.

The religious context of the story is one of the relationship between a society and its leaders and the order of nature. Schoffeleers suggested that many pre-modern cultures considered that, if the social order were disturbed by a ruler exceeding their accepted role and oppressing their people, the natural order would also be disordered, and natural calamities such as floods or drought would result. These disasters could best be avoided by restoring and maintaining checks on such abuses of power, such as restoring the Khulubvi shrine as the focus of rain making rituals, a role than the first Lundu had usurped.

The interpretation by Schoffeleers of M'Bona as an historical person has been debated by other scholars. Although not specifically referring to M’Bona, Terence Ranger described a "territorial cult" among the Maravi people as one where a spirit was believed to secure the well-being of the people in a particular area through rain-making, the control of floods, securing the fertility of the soil or success in fishing or hunting. The spirits venerated were originally nature spirits related to specific local sites, often with female priestesses or mediums. Over time, Ranger believed, many such cult sites came under the control of locally-powerful families, who changed the nature of the spirit to that of a deified ancestor and reduced the priestesses’ role to being that ancestor’s wives.

More specifically, M'Bona was said to have originated as a river god or spirit of a type known in the area of the Zambezi and its tributaries, either as a protector against floods or a provider of rain. The M'Bona spirit was also linked to the snake, part of a widespread African mythology of the conflict between the eagle, representing lightning and flood and the python, representing the rainbow and sufficient rainfall, without flood or drought. It is unlikely that there was originally a single M'Bona cult with many shrines over a wide area, rather that a range of shrines were originally devoted to different aspects of this myth. This scholar also doubted whether a strong Lundu state existed around 1600.

The response that Schoffeleers made to Wrigley’s criticisms was that myth and history were not mutually exclusive, but could co-exist, so that M’Bona could be both an historical person and a manifestation of the mythical snake. He also argued that available historical documents were sparse and written by Portuguese with little insight into African political or religious matters, so must be supplemented by oral history, including the various versions of the M’Bona story.

Nyau is the name for a range of societies, found mainly among Chewa speaking people in Malawi and Mozambique but also among the Mang'anja and others peoples of the Maravi cluster. The societies perform masked dances of the same name, traditionally at the memorial ceremonies held a few months up to a year after a person's death, and at initiation ceremonies. Since Malawian independence, one dance, the Gule Wamkulu, has been performed at national celebrations. It was estimated in 1975 that there were some 500 Nyau groups, organised at village level and without any central authority regulating them, with perhaps 10,000 active members. The main feature of these dances is the use of masks appropriate to a particular dance, including human or animal masks and others combining human and animal features. In Schoffeleers’ analysis, the religious element of a Nyau performance is the portrayal of the proper relationship between mankind and the natural environment it lives in, as represented by wild animals, and the restoration of harmony between the two.

He also considered that the autonomy of most Nyau groups was a corrective to local chiefs who disturbed the social order by acting beyond their accepted role or in an arbitrary way. The antipathy of Nyau societies to the Catholic Church may be as much to its centralised organisation as its teachings. Although Schoffeleers wrote little on spirit possession after his D. Phil thesis. He retained an interest in the subject. A friend of his allegedly really saw a spirit form materialised, and she took the position that spirits and spirit affliction are real and not matters of metaphor, symbolism or psychology. Schoffeleers has adopted a neutral position, accepting the reality of the experience to the individual, but remaining uncertain of its origin.

=== Oral history and anthropology ===
Like many late twentieth century anthropologists, Schoffeleers considered that data from his fieldwork had historical implications. He supported ideas of Ranger that the historical study of African religion and its rituals and or oral traditions could allow the undocumented past to be reconstructed. He edited a collection of studies on territorial cults in Malawi, Zambia and Zimbabwe that built on Ranger’s earlier studies and presented a method for the interpretation of the oral histories relating to these cults. However, this was criticised as a basic misconception in the use of oral sources, believing that a tradition recorded by the oral historian has been transmitted in a virtually unchanged form from an original source unaltered in the chain of oral transmissions.

Schoffeleers opposed the view that origin myths preserved as oral history were routinely manipulated to conform to political and social changes, believing that accounts of the past origin of important aspects of a society generally preserve the original event in a form that can be recovered, although often only with great difficulty. He demonstrated this approach by comparing two apparently conflicting versions of the M’Bona story to reconstruct a version suggesting that it records the suppression by an emerging Lundu state of existing rain-making cults and the re-emergence of the cult when Lundu power waned.

After over 30 years study of the M’Bona cult and story, Schoffeleers presented a synthesis in 1992, in which he claimed that both had originated in the context of a change in Portuguese policy in Zambezia in the 1590s when, instead of operating under the protection of local rulers, they set up fortified Portuguese enclaves, cooperating with some local rulers in attacking others, raiding for slaves and disrupting agriculture, causing suffering through an area that included southern Malawi, which at that time contained no powerful states. African mercenaries employed by the Portuguese and generally called Zimba destroyed centres of possible resistance, including cult shrines. These Zimba conquerors, in his view, set up more sizeable centralised states in the area over a 30-year period, including one whose leader had the title of Lundu.

However, the alien Lundu rulers had no connection to, and no means of communicating with, the territorial spirits whose shrines they had destroyed so the original population regarded their rule as an illegitimate one. The former shrines were centres of resistance, and once the first Lundu was defeated in 1622 by the Portuguese, who had turned against him, and their allies, the shrine was restored. However, it did not resume its original form as a shrine to the High God who had had the particular manifestation as a python there, but as a shrine for M’Bona, a martyr whose nature could be either that of a single individual or a personification of the suffering of the conquered people. Schoffeleers generally prefers the explanation of M’Bona as a personification of suffering.

=== Zionist churches in South Africa ===
In 1991 Schoffeleers published a paper on the Zionist churches in South Africa that argued against Jean Comaroff's claim that, although the rituals of these churches had no direct and immediate effect on the political system in South Africa they were made a significant contribution to resistance against white minority rule. Zionist churches, in her view, protested against South Africa’s power structures by rejecting the history that alien rulers had imposed on them, reconstructing their own identity through rituals that had a political dimension.

Schoffeleers’ paper argued that Comaroff had stretched the concept of protest well beyond its ordinary meaning. While accepting that some African-initiated churches have been politically active and centres of resistance, he considered that this was by no means universal, and that even previously politically-active churches had been depoliticised after 1948. He argued that the Zionist churches’ focus on individual healing was essentially conservative, and that their cooperation with the South African government was less from fear of reprisals than from this conservatism, which made them non-political and acquiescent. His article was controversial, and led to Schoffeleers being attacked in print and verbally at a number of conferences, mainly because what he said was inopportune or politically inconvenient rather than not in accordance with the available evidence.

=== Regional history ===
In 1987, Schoffeleers presented a summary of the history of the Shire Valley in the late 16th and early 17th centuries, partly derived from oral sources, at variance with accounts based on documentary evidence. It had been suggested that the trade in ivory with Muslim traders based on the coast of Nampula Province and in Zambezia Province was central to the rise of centralised Maravi states in an area that the Maravi had occupied for some centuries. The later conflicts between these states, and the political changes in the area between 1570 and 1640 were said to result from the disruption of this ivory trade by the Portuguese who had been excluded from it and their African allies.

However, there is little documentary evidence that the Maravi people were established in the Shire and central Zambezi valleys before the 16th century or that there was a substantial trade on ivory between them and the coastal Muslims, and there is evidence that the Portuguese were already involved in the Zambezi ivory trade by the mid-16th century, which probably involved Africans other than the Maravi. The early sources for this region are sparse, although several Portuguese priests that worked there left contemporary or near-contemporary accounts, which indicate that there was only a limited trade in ivory involving the Makua people and no evidence of Maravi people in the Lower Shire valley, let alone organised Maravi or other states in that area, before the 1570s.

Several invading groups entered Zambezia in the late 16th and early 17th centuries, including one called the Zimba by the Portuguese, who attacked the Portuguese settlements of Tete and Sena in the Zambezi valley. Some of these Zimba were probably Maravi people migrating in small groups that were led by minor chiefs but conflict with the Portuguese rather than trade with the coastal Muslims led to them coalescing into larger states, of which the first was described in a Portuguese source of 1608. The earliest record of the Lundu title dates from 1614.

Schoffeleers accepts that the creation of centralised Maravi states was not a result of the ivory trade, but nevertheless believed that several such states were in existence by the second half of the 16th century and that they underwent rapid expansion after 1572 when the Portuguese began building forts in the Zambezi valley. His account placing the Zimba on the north bank of the Zambezi in 1592 is based on a contemporary written source, but he suggests the first Lundu as already a powerful figure in the 1590s, even though this is not mentioned in any contemporary document.

The first reason that Schoffeleers gave for this view is that the Zimba, who Portuguese sources identified as having entered the Zambezi valley by 1590 were an army organised by the first Lundu and sent against the Portuguese settlements to consolidate his power in the Lower Shire valley. Although accepting that there is no documentary evidence for this link, Schoffeleers mentions an oral tradition recorded in 1907, that a group whose name he translates as “Lundu’s men” who ravaged the middle Zambezi area at some unspecified past date were the Zimba. As a second reason, he links one of the M’Bona myths about the claim of the Lundu it mentions to possess rain-making powers with an account of a ceremony recorded by a Portuguese priest in 1608, in which the first Lundu claimed supernatural powers. None of this proves the existence of a strong Lundu state in the 1590s, and Schoffeleers accepts that those Maravi with whom the Portuguese were actually in direct contact in that decade were organised only as small chiefdoms. However, he suggests it was possible that the Lundu state had developed over the preceding two decades sufficiently far from Portuguese settlements to escape their notice.

== Later life ==
After his retirement in 1989, Schoffeleers lived in Leiden, continuing his research and publishing articles. He was diagnosed as in the first stage of Alzheimer's disease in 2001, and his illness forced him to give up his Leiden apartment in 2006 and move to a Montfort community at Maastricht in the south the Netherlands, close to his birthplace. Matthew Schoffeleers died at Maastricht on 24 April 2011.

== See also ==
- Mbona cult

== Sources ==
- A Tribute to the Life of Fr. Matthew Schoffeleers (1928 — 2011). Malawianist, Renaissance man and free-thinker. The Society of Malaŵi Journal Special Memorial Edition, 2011
- E. A. Alpers, (1975). ‘Ivory and Slaves in East Central Africa; changing patterns of international trade to the later nineteenth century’. London, Heinemann. ISBN 978-0-43532-005-8.
- W. M. J. van Binsbergen, (2011). ‘In Memoriam: Matthew Schoffeleers (1928–2011)’. Journal of Religion in Africa, Vol. 41, No. 4, pp. 455–463.
- J. Comaroff, (1985). Body of Power, Spirit of Resistance: the culture and history of a South African people’. Chicago, University of Chicago Press. ISBN 978-0-22611-423-1.
- I. Linden and J. Linden, (1974). ‘Catholics, Peasants, and Chewa Resistance in Nyasaland, 1889–1939’. Los Angeles, University of California Press. ISBN 0-52002-500-8.
- B. Meyer and R. Reis, (2006) ‘Matthew Schoffeleers: Anthropologist and Priest’. Etnofoor, Vol. 18, No. 2, pp. 23–46.
- M. D. D. Newitt, (1982). ‘The Early History of the Maravi’. The Journal of African History, Vol. 23, No. 2, pp. 145–162.
- T. Ranger, (1973). ‘Territorial Cults in the History of Central Africa’. The Journal of African History, Vol. 14, No. 4, pp. 581–597.
- J. M. Schoffeleers (editor), (1978). ‘Guardians of the land. Essays on Central African territorial cults’. Gweru, Mambo Press. ISBN 978-0-86922-734-3.
- J.M. Schoffeleers, (1980). ‘The Story of Mbona the Martyr’, in R Schefold, J W Schoorl and J. Tennekes (editors) ‘Man, Meaning and History: Essays in Honour of H.G. Schulte Nordholt’ Leiden, Brill. ISBN 978-9-00428-720-4.
- J. M. Schoffeleers, (1992). ‘River of Blood: The Genesis of a Martyr Cult in Southern Malawi, c. A.D. 1600’. Madison, University of Wisconsin Press. ISBN 0-29913-324-9.
- M. Schoffeleers, (1972). ‘The History and Political Role of the M'Bona Cult among the Mang'anja’. in T. O. Ranger and I. N. Kimambo (editors), ‘The Historical Study of African Religion’. Berkeley, University of California Press. ISBN 0-52003-179-2.
- M. Schoffeleers, (1975). ‘The Interaction of the M'Bona Cult and Christianity’, in T. O. Ranger and J. C. Weller (editors), ‘Themes in the Christian History of Central Africa’. Berkeley, University of California Press. ISBN 0-52002-536-9.
- M. Schoffeleers, (1976). ‘The Nyau Societies: our present understanding’. The Society of Malawi Journal, Vol. 29, No. 1, pp. 59–68.
- M. Schoffeleers, (1987A). ‘Ideological Confrontation and the Manipulation of Oral History: A Zambesian Case’. History in Africa, Vol. 14 (1987), pp. 257–273.
- M. Schoffeleers, (1987B). ‘The Zimba and the Lundu State in the Late Sixteenth and Early Seventeenth Centuries’. The Journal of African History, Vol. 28, No. 3, pp. 337–355.
- M. Schoffeleers, (1988). ‘Myth and/or History: A Reply to Christopher Wrigley’. The Journal of African History, Vol. 29, No. 3, pp. 385–390.
- M. Schoffeleers, (1991). 'Ritual Healing and Political Acquiescence: The Case of Zionist Churches in Southern Africa.' Africa Vol. 61, No. 2, pp. 1–25.
- R. Willis, (1980). ‘The Literalist Fallacy and the Problem of Oral Tradition’. Social Analysis: The International Journal of Social and Cultural Practice No. 4, Using Oral Sources: Vansina and Beyond, pp. 28–37
- C. Wrigley, (1988). The River-God and the Historians: Myth in the Shire Valley and Elsewhere. The Journal of African History, Vol. 29, No. 3, pp. 367–383
