= Nsenga =

Nsenga may refer to:

- Nsenga people, an ethnic tribe of Zambia and Mozambique
- Nsenga language, spoken by the Nsenga people
