= Msinja =

Site in Malawi

- Location within Malawi Location within Africa
- 14°33′S 33°39′E
- Type: Settlement
- Cultures: Maravi
- Location: Lilongwe District, Malawi
- Part of: Maravi Empire

History
- Built: 12th or 13th century CE
- Abandoned: ?

Msinja is a site in Malawi. It was settled by the Chewa, specifically the Banda clan led by priestess Makewana, from the 12th or 13th century. It was below the Dzalanyama range and near to Kaphirintiwa Hill (a sacred site in Chewa traditional religion) and Tsang'oma (the location of a shrine housing the mbiriwiri drum).
