= Samuel Josia Ntara =

Pioneering Malawian novelist writer and teacher (1905-1976)

- Born: Samuel Yosia Ntara; 24 September 1905; Mvera, Central Region, Malawi

Samuel Josia Ntara (24 September 1905 – 1976) was a pioneering writer and teacher from Malawi. He wrote in ChiChewa and several of his books were translated into English.

Ntara's name is spelled in various ways. In his early publications, his middle name is spelled 'Yosia' and then later anglicised to 'Josia'. Occasionally it appears as 'Josiah'. 'Ntara' is also sometimes spelled 'Nthara'. He is often credited simply as S.J. Ntara.

== Life ==
Samuel Yosia Ntara was born on 24 September 1905 in the British Central Africa Protectorate. His father was Josiah Kamfumu, a teacher at the Dutch Reformed Church Mission in Mvera, and his mother was Margaret Sungani. His parents were both AChewa.

Ntara's early life was shaped by the Dutch Reformed Church missions at Mvera and Nkhoma. The missions were very strong in their promotion of local languages, including ChiChewa. This included the creation of a magazine in 1909 called Mthenga, which would continue until at least the 1950s.

J. Lou Pretorius, a missionary of the Dutch Reformed Church, commented on these early experiences:

Many Africans contributed to Mthenga and thus gained experience in writing in their own language. Samuel Y. Ntara went rather beyond his fellows and became successful as a writer of books.

At Mvera, Ntara passed standard three before becoming a teacher in local village schools. In 1927, he travelled to the Nkhoma Mission to undertake formal teacher training. This allowed him to continue his career at schools in Lilongwe and elsewhere. In 1932, he was posted back to the Nkhoma Mission as a teacher. He continued to study during this time, enrolling on a correspondence course at Union College in South Africa, and marrying Flonie in 1934. In 1944 Ntara was posted to Kongwe School in Dowa, another Dutch Reformed Church school. In 1951 he returned to Nkhoma.

Ntara was a member of the Nyasaland African Congress since its inception in 1943. At the inaugural meeting of the Congress held in Blantyre in October 1944, Ntara represented Lilongwe alongside Levi Zelilo Mumba, George Simeon Mwase, and others.

Ntara retired in the early 1960s to a home in Kamphata, near Lilongwe. He served as an Elder of the Church of Central Africa Presbyterian, became a founding member of the Malawi Censorship Board in 1968, and in 1975 became the first chairman of the National Monuments Advisory Council.

Samuel Josia Ntara died in 1976.

== Work ==
Ntara published fictional and non-fictional biographies, an oral history, and a collection of idioms over a 30-year period.

=== Nthondo or Man of Africa ===
While teaching in Lilongwe, Ntara saw an advert for a literary competition sponsored by the International Institute of African Languages and Cultures in London. In 1932, he submitted a manuscript to the competition, alongside other works in ChiChewa by George Simeon Mwase and Steven Kumakanga. Ntara's manuscript was entitled Nthondo and it won a prize in the biography category.

The original ChiChewa version of Nthondo was published in 1933, and in the following year an English translation appeared with the title, Man of Africa. The English translation was undertaken by Thomas Cullen Young, a missionary who promoted the work of a number of local writers, and featured a foreword by Julian Huxley. It was positively reviewed on publication.

In his introduction, Huxley explains:

It is a liberating experience to obtain a glimpse of another kind of life which is not as our life, which exists in its own right and by its own standards...I am sure there will be many who, like myself, will feel that after reading it they have gained a new insight into African anthropology, African psychology, African native problems: and equally sure that many, again like myself, will enjoy the pure literary quality, so simple yet so effective, of the story.

Nthondo is a fictional biography set in during the latter half of the nineteenth century. The eponymous central character grows up in a traditional rural setting before experiencing a religious crisis and converting to Christianity. In trying to interpret Man of Africa, Sadhana Naithani concludes: 'Was Ntara trying to conform to the image already present, or was he writing under the influence of his adopted faith—these are questions difficult to answer from the materials we have. It is also possible that his images are being misunderstood completely. An analysis of this text awaits the attention of an Africanist-folklorist'.

Ntara entered the same writing competition a decade later with a manuscript entitled Colembera Bukuli, although it did not win and was never published.

=== Mbiri ya AChewa or History of the Chewa ===
Following the success of his novel, Ntara turned his attention to the history of the AChewa. Ntara collected his first oral history from Reverend Namon Katengeza, the first African to be ordained by the Dutch Reformed Church Mission at Nkhoma. The resulting seven-page document was published in 1944. Further research with other informants led to significant revision and enlargement, with a second edition appearing in 1949. A third and final ChiChewa edition, enlarged again, appeared in 1965. It was this final edition that was translated as History of the Chewa and published in 1973. Reviews of the English edition are extremely critical, questioning the translation itself and the commentary. The choice to use the 1965 edition as its source is also criticised, as it omits important content found in the 1949 edition.

Ian Linden, in his review of History of the Chewa, is scathing:

The History of the Chewa is a frightening example of what can come out of the academic scramble for Africa. Helpful in some areas, its overall effect is to add one more level of distortion to the chain of testimonies that began in the Chewa past.

=== Nchowa ===
In 1949, Ntara published Nchowa, which is seen as the counterpart to Nthondo. Nchowa is another fictional biography, this time of a Chewa woman. It was published in an abridged form by Longmans, Green and Company. In spite of coming into contact with Christianity, the novel's eponymous main character does not have a religious crisis like that experienced by Nthondo.

=== Msyamboza or Headman's Enterprise ===
1949 also saw the publication of Ntara's first non-fiction biographical work. Msyamboza was a village headman at Chibanzi, a few miles from Kongwe where Ntara had been teaching since 1944. In his biography, Ntara recounts Msyamboza's reactions to the influence of religion and colonialism in the nineteenth and early twentieth centuries. Msyamboza's conversion to Christianity marks the climax of the book.

The book was published simultaneously in ChiChewa and English, with Cullen Young again undertaking the translation as he had for Man of Africa. The full English title is Headman's Enterprise: An Unexpected page in Central African History.

Cullen Young, writing in the early 1950s, attempted to bring greater attention to this body of work:

I may, perhaps, take this opportunity of bringing to more public notice the work in authorship and historical research which has been going on for 30 years in quiet seclusion at Mkhoma by Mr Samuel Nthara. In no other land has comparable work been done by any man of the first literate generation.

=== Other works ===
Following his transfer back to Nkhoma in the early 1950s, Ntara was commissioned to write a biography of Reverend Namon Katengeza, who had provided him with the first oral histories for his Mbiri ya AChewa. It was published in 1964 by the Nkhoma Mission Press.

In the same year that his biography of Namon Katengeza appeared, Ntara published a book of ChiChewa idioms entitled Mau Okuluwika.

In 1946, Ntara also translated a manual on soil erosion written by John Clements and Paul Topham into ChiChewa under the title Madzi ndi nthaka.

== Works ==
- Ntara, Samuel Y. (1933). Nthondo. Nkhoma: Nkhoma Mission Press.
- Ntara, Samuel Y. (1934). Man of Africa. Translated by Cullen Young, Thomas. London: Bible and Tract Society.
- Ntara, S.J. (1944). Mbiri ya Achewa. Nkhoma: Nkhoma Mission Press.
- Clements, John Burton; Topham, Paul (1946). Madzi ndi nthaka. Translated by Ntara, Samuel Josia. London: Oxford University Press.
- Ntara, Samuel Josia (1949). Mbiri ya Achewa. Zomba: Northern Rhodesia and Nyasaland Literature Bureau.
- Ntara, Samuel Josia (1949). Nchowa: Life Story of a Cewa Woman. Longmans' Cinyanja Series. London: Longman, Green and Co.
- Ntara, Samuel Josia (1949). Msyambozya. Nkhoma: Nkhoma Mission Press.
- Ntara, Samuel Josia (1949). Headman's Enterprise: An Unexpected Page in Central African History. Translated by Cullen Young, Thomas. Lutterworth Press.
- Ntara, Samuel Josia (1964). Moyo ndi Nchito za Namon Katengeza. Nkhoma: Nkhoma Synod of the Church of Central Africa.
- Ntara, S.J. (1964). Mau Okuluwika M'cinyanja. Lusaka: Northern Rhodesia Publications Bureau.
- Ntara, S.J. (1965). Mbiri ya Achewa. Blantyre: Malawi Publications and Literature Bureau.
- Ntara, S.Y. (1969). "The Visitor". In Dathorne, O.R.; Feuser, Willfried (eds.). Africa in Prose. Penguin African Library. Penguin Books. pp. 125–130.
- Ntara, Samuel Josia (1973). History of the Chewa. Translated by Jere, Kamphandira. Stuttgart: Franz Steiner Verlag.

== Sources ==
- Chimombo, Steve (1989). "Dreams, Conversion and Ntara's "Man of Africa"". Journal of Religion in Africa. 19 (1): 48–70.
- Dathorne, O. R. (1974). The Black Mind: A History of African Literature. Minneapolis: University of Minnesota Press.
- I.C.W. (1935). "Man of Africa. By Samuel Y. Ntara. Translated by Rev. T. Cullen Young. R.T.S. 3S. 6d". Bulletin of the School of Oriental and African Studies. 7 (4): 1019.
- Kalinga, Owen J. M. (2012). Historical Dictionary of Malawi. Lanham: Scarecrow Press.
- Lamba, Isaac C. (1983). "The Cape Dutch Reformed Church Mission in Malawi: A Preliminary Historical Examination of Its Educational Philosophy and Application, 1889-1931". Transafrican Journal of History. 12: 51–74.
- Linden, Ian (1975). "Review of The History of the Chewa (Mbiri ya Achewa)". The International Journal of African Historical Studies. 8: 113–117.
- Juwayeyi, Yusuf M. (2020). Archaeology and Oral Tradition in Malawi: Origins and Early History of the Chewa. James Currey.
- Naithani, Sadhana (2010). The Story-Time of the British Empire: Colonial and Postcolonial Folkloristics. Jackson: University Press of Mississippi.
- Page, Melvin E. (1975). "Review of The History of the Chewa (Mbiri y a Achewa)". Anthropos. 70 (5/6): 968–969. ISSN 0257-9774. JSTOR 40458858.
- Pachai, B. (1968). "SAMUEL JOSIAH NTARA: Writer and Historian". The Society of Malawi Journal. 21 (2): 60–66.
- Pretorius, J. L. (1957). "The Story of the Dutch Reformed Church Mission in Nyasaland". The Nyasaland Journal. 10 (1): 11–22.
- Ross, R. (2013). Malawi and Scotland Together in the Talking Place Since 1859. Mzuni Press.
- Schoffeleers, Matthew (1975). Ntara, Samuel Josia; Heintze, Beatrix; Jere, W. S. Kamphandira (eds.). "A Chronicle from Central Africa". The Journal of African History. 16 (3): 463–464.
- Ward, Ida (1945). "The Prize Essay Competition". Africa. 15 (3): 156–158.
- Westermann, D. (1935). "Man of Africa. By S. Y. Ntara. Translated and arranged from the original Nyanja by T. Cullen Young. Foreword by Julian Huxley. Pp. 181. Illustr. London: The Religious Tract Society. 1934. 3s. 6d". Africa. 8 (2): 238. doi:10.2307/3180516.
- Young, Cullen (1953). "Place-Names in Nyasaland". The Nyasaland Journal. 6 (2): 35–36.
