= Manthimba =

- Former city
- Location within Malawi
- Coordinates: 14°13′14″S 34°32′07″E
- Country: Malawi
- Former country: Maravi
- Region: Central
- District: Dedza

Manthimba was considered by Malawian historian Kings M. Phiri to have been the capital of the Maravi Empire, however Yusuf Juwayeyi considers it to have been Mankhamba. Manthimba was located at 2 kilometres (1.2 mi) from the present village of Mtakataka in the Dedza district, in the central region of Malawi.
