= Mano, Mozambique =

Site in Mozambique

Mano
- Location within Mozambique Location within Africa
- 15°24′S 32°54′E
- Type: Settlement
- Cultures: Maravi
- Location: Tete Province, Mozambique
- Part of: Maravi Empire

History
- Built: pre-17th century
- Abandoned: ?

Mano is a site in Mozambique. It was the capital of Undi's kingdom, and was established some time before the early-17th century.
