= Lubaland =

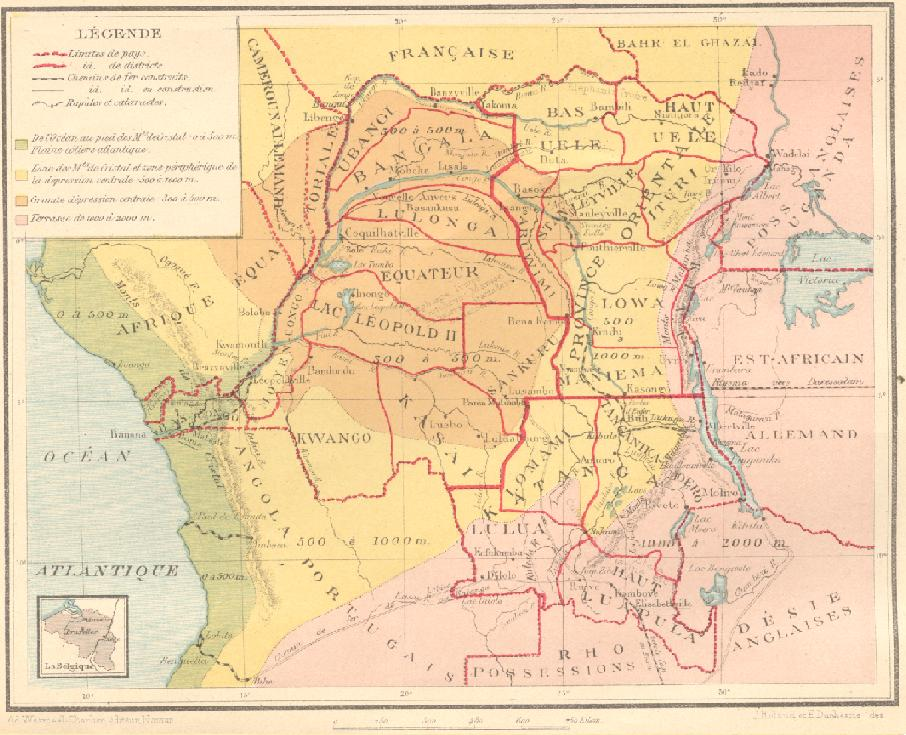
1914 Map: See area marked for Leopold II

Lubaland refers to the savanah grassland south of the Congo River where the Luba people live; now the southeastern portion of the Democratic Republic of the Congo. Around 1500 CE Lubas united to form a kingdom which was ultimately taken over in 1885 by Leopold II, King of Belgium, who made it part of his Congo Free State. Lubaland stretches from the Lwembe river to about 50 kilometers east of the Congo River, between 6°30′ and 10°00′ S in north-central Shaba. The area is a savanah except Upemba Depression.

== See also ==
- Geography of the Democratic Republic of the Congo
