= Maravi =

Former empire which straddled the current borders of Malawi, Mozambique, and Zambia

Maravi Empire malaŵí (Chichewa)
- pre-1450–1860s
- The Maravi empire in the 17th century. (Note: Karanga refers to the Mutapa Empire.)
- Capital: Mankhamba
- Common languages: Chichewa
- Religion: Chewa traditional religion
- Government: Monarchy
- Kalonga
  - pre-15th century: Chinkhole (first)
  - ?: Chidzonzi
  - pre–1608 – 1640s: Muzura
  - ?–1860s: Sosola (last)
- History
  - Adoption of kingship: pre-1450
  - Incorporation of Makewana's Pre-Maravi: pre-1450
  - Kaphiti and Lundu break away south: pre-1450
  - Undi and Nyangu settle in Tete Province: post-1450
  - Kalonga Muzura conquers Lundu's polity: 1622
  - Yao chief Mnanula/Pemba kills Kalonga Sosola in battle: 1860s
Preceded by	Succeeded by
Pre-Maravi	Yao chiefdoms
- Today part of: Malawi; Mozambique; Zambia

The Maravi Empire or Maravi Confederacy was a Chewa polity that controlled what is now central and southern Malawi, parts of Mozambique, and eastern Zambia, from at least the early 15th century to the mid-19th century. In the 17th century, the empire extended westwards to the Luangwa River, northwards to Nkhotakota, and southwards to the Zambezi, with its influence stretching eastwards to Mozambique Island and Quelimane.

The Chewa migrated from Katanga in modern-day DR Congo to Malawi. The Banda clan and other smaller clans arrived in Malawi first in the 12th or 13th century, and are termed the Pre-Maravi. The Phiri clan adopted kingship and were led by the Kalonga (king), and arrived in Malawi later; they are termed the Maravi. After reaching Msinja, the Maravi integrated the Pre-Maravi's sociopolitical organisation. As the Maravi continued their migration, two relatives of the Kalonga, Kaphiti and Lundu, left following a succession dispute to establish their own kingdoms. The Maravi state expanded through the Kalonga sending relatives to found new subordinate polities. After the Maravi settled at Mankhamba, another succession dispute caused Undi to leave and establish his own kingdom, accompanied by the royal family and Nyangu. Lundu allied with the Zimba, a militaristic group which fought the Portuguese, in the late-16th century. In the 17th century, Kalonga Muzura expanded the empire and conquered Lundu's polity, however failed to expel the Portuguese from the region. In the 18th century, the system of succession broke down as a long-term consequence of Nyangu and the royal family's separation from the Kalonga in Mankhamba, leading to internal conflict and disintegration. This was exacerbated in the 19th century by frequent slave raiding from Yao chiefs, culminating in the death of the last Kalonga, Sosola, in battle in the late 1860s. The Chewa Royal Establishment, a non-sovereign monarchy centred in eastern Zambia, claims continuation of Undi's dynasty.

The empire was headed by the Kalonga, with other leaders paying tribute, often in the form of ivory. Titles were governed by the institutions of positional succession and perpetual kinship. (Note: Originating in the Lunda Empire, positional succession is where the successor to a title takes on their predecessor's name, identity, and duties, while as a consequence perpetual kinship is where the successor inherits their predecessor's kinship relations.) Various Chewa religious institutions were utilised to foster unity in the state, such as the Mlira ceremony, which involved royal family heads convening on the capital to venerate the spirit of the Kalonga that led the Maravi's migration. The head of the Phiri clan was the mother or sister of the Kalonga, holding the title of Nyangu, from which successors to the kingship had to descend. While the Kalonga held secular authority, the Makewana priestess, as head of the Banda clan and of the Pre-Maravi, held ritual authority. The Makewana was in charge of the rainmaking shrine at Kaphirintiwa Hill. The economy consisted of both arable and pastoral agriculture. Linkage to both African and Indian Ocean long-distance trade facilitated the export of cloth and iron tools and import of glass beads and copper.

== Name ==
The name Maravi is a Portuguese derivation on the word Malawi, which the Chewa had used to refer to themselves. In the Chewa language, malaŵí means "flames". According to Samuel Josia Ntara's Mbiri ya Achewa (1944/5), (Note: Ntara's informant was Stephen Kazare, who was a descendant of Kalonga Sosola and served as Chauma at the Mankhamba shrine. As such, his version is considered to be the 'purest' Phiri clan tradition. In 1973, Ntara's 3rd edition (published in 1965) was translated into English by W. S. Kamphandira Jere with commentary from historian Harry Langworthy. Other scholars have criticised it for its many mistranslations and errors, poorly researched commentary, and choice of the 3rd edition which omits important context found in the 2nd edition (1949).) Malawi referred to an area along Lake Malawi where a Chewa king and his people settled long ago. Chewa tradition says that Lake Malawi looked like flames or a mirage when they first saw it from the highlands. Subsequently, the land between Lake Malombe and the Linthipe River was called Malawi, and they referred to themselves as Amalawi.

== History ==
=== Origins ===
The Chewa have two different traditions of origin. The first holds that Chiuta (God) created the Chewa and animals at Kaphirintiwa Hill, where there are patterns in the rock that resemble human and animal footprints. Thus, it holds that the Chewa have always inhabited their present homeland. The second is in agreement with the most widely accepted models of the Bantu expansion, where most Chewa traditions hold that they migrated to modern-day Malawi from Uluwa in Katanga (a region to the northwest). (Note: Some traditions hold they originated from around Ghana and Nigeria in West Africa.) They are associated with Naviundu pottery in Katanga dated to the 4th century CE. The Banda clan and other smaller clans arrived in Malawi first, while the Phiri clan migrated later. Scholars use the term Maravi to refer to the Phiri, and Pre-Maravi to refer to the Banda and others (traditionally called Kalimanjira, "path-finders"). Both groups are thought to have left Katanga around the 11th century.

==== Pre-Maravi ====
The Pre-Maravi reached Malawi between the 12th and 14th centuries. (Note: B. W. Smith has suggested that the Pre-Maravi arrived in Malawi around the 6th or 7th centuries based on pottery associated with Western-Bantu-language speakers uncovered in Zambia. However, this is unsupported by archaeological research at Mankhamba.) According to tradition, they found a pygmy people called Akafula (the local Twa) against whom they fought a battle (near Mankhamba) and drove south across the Zambezi River. They are said to have also met agriculturalists, called the Katanga, Pule, or Lenda, with archaeological research indicating Malawi was inhabited by agriculturalists from the 3rd century CE. This group likely intermarried with the Chewa and was absorbed. The Pre-Maravi settled at Msinja, below the Dzalanyama range and near Kaphirintiwa Hill which—likely following the discovery of the patterns of footprints—became the society's ritual centre with a kachisi (rainmaking shrine). Msinja had high-quality soil and lots of water for agriculture. The Makewana (also called Mangadzi), head of the Banda clan and priestess, held the most authority. Scholars such as Jan Vansina have characterised the Pre-Maravi as a state with Makewana as leader. The Makewana appointed Matsano (spirit wives) to hill-top shrines, of which there was a hierarchy, with the Makewana's Kaphirintiwa shrine considered the "mother" of shrines. While these figures specialised in ritual authority, they also held substantial secular authority, although Kamundi (of the Mbewe clan and partner to Makewana) likely de facto held secular leadership. Engagement with the Indian Ocean trade likely began around the 13th century through the Lake Malawi–Lake Tanganyika corridor, with the main export being ivory.

==== The Maravi's migration ====
Tradition says that the Maravi stopped at various places in search for a place to settle. One of these was called Choma, which may refer to a river in Zambia flowing into Lake Mweru which the first Kalonga (king) and his people were said to have crossed, a mountain in Mzimba District (thought to have a burial site of a Kalonga), or a place in southern Zambia. Clan names are said to have been created there, although Yusuf Juwayeyi says that given how essential they are to Chewa society this is unlikely. Prior to this settlement, the Maravi are said to have had the same female ritual leadership as the Pre-Maravi. According to tradition, they met an Arab trader named "Hasan Bin Ali" (possibly Sultan al-Hassan ibn Suliman of Kilwa who reigned in the 14th century, or representatives of him) who convinced them to have him as their first king. However, he died before he could be initiated, interpreted as divine intervention against enthroning a foreigner. Instead, Chinkhole, a local, was appointed the first Kalonga, and religiosity shifted to the veneration of rulers. Chinkhole's mother or sister, Nyangu, was head of the Phiri clan. Possibly due to lack of land for their growing population, the Maravi left Choma. Another stop was Chewa Hill, from which they are said to have derived their endonym (though scholars have alternative theories on the word's origin). Juwayeyi writes that "it is not possible to figure out from oral traditions how long the Maravi were on the road before they arrived at [their final destination], and neither can it really be confirmed how many Kalongas led them".

Tradition continues with the Maravi finally reaching Msinja, where they met the Pre-Maravi, led by the Makewana. As invaders, the Kalonga aimed to destroy the Pre-Maravi's political organisation by attacking the shrine on Kaphirintiwa Hill, but the shrine was difficult to reach and fiercely defended. In his defeat, the Kalonga accepted the Makewana's ritual authority, taking her secular authority, and it was established that the Banda clan would provide the Kalonga's principal wife (titled Mwali). The Pre-Maravi's socio-political organisation was incorporated into the Maravi state. Possibly due to concerns about causing friction with the Pre-Maravi, the Maravi continued their migration, stopping at Mawere a Nyangu (Note: So-called because it featured two hills likened to Nyangu's breasts (who was Kalonga's mother or sister and head of the Phiri clan).) for a long time. A dispute arose around the practise of dark magic, and the poison mwavi was distributed in order to kill the culprit, but many innocent people died. Two relatives of the Kalonga, Kaphiti and Lundu, were thought to be the culprits, which caused a dispute between Changamire (the Kalonga's brother) and Kaphiti. Possibly after a succession dispute, Kaphiti and Lundu broke away to the south to establish their own kingdoms. The Kalonga sent Changamire south to expand the state and found new settlements, as he intended to migrate north. After their population outgrew the land at Mawere a Nyangu, they finally moved onto Msangu wa Machete, which was near the Nadzipulu River (in Dedza District) and Lake Malawi. According to Ntara's Mbiri ya Achewa, the Banda built their village called Mankhamba and the Phiri built theirs called Malawi. Archaeological research indicates that Mankhamba was settled (likely by the Pre-Maravi) between the 12th and 14th centuries, and the Maravi were very likely present there from at least the mid-15th century due to evidence of long-distance trade. Juwayeyi considers Mankhamba to have been Kalonga's capital; however, Kings M. Phiri thought it to have been Manthimba. The area southwest of Lake Malawi became the new homeland of the Maravi.

=== Expansion and apogee ===
The empire was expanded with the Kalonga sending his sons and family members to found new tributary polities and giving them emblems of office (such as an iron stool), as he had done with Changamire to present-day Ntcheu District, whose polity became relatively powerful. Juwayeyi mentions Chidzonzi as the successor of Chinkhole, and says that he led the Maravi out of Choma. K. M. Phiri wrote that Chidzonzi was the Kalonga when Undi, Kalonga's brother, broke away unilaterally, and was the best-known out of the Kalongas for his founding of various institutions, such as the Mlira cult. The first Undi's departure was reportedly due to a succession dispute, while other traditions attribute it to his distaste of Mankhamba or a dispute with the new Kalonga around dinner customs (a clash between political seniority and familial seniority). In the succession dispute, Undi had the support of most of the royal family but not the counsellors (new Kalongas had to be of the Phiri clan and descendants of Nyangu, and approved by counsellors). When Undi left, most of the royal family followed, including the Nyangu. He stopped at Msinja before settling at Mano (in modern-day Tete Province, Mozambique). The Nyangu's accompaniment meant Undi could nominate succession candidates. At Mankhamba, Mwali's role became more significant, giving Kalonga's counsellors (who were all Banda) more power. At Mano, Undi expanded his influence towards Msinja, to such levels he could also appoint the Makewana's successors, and his authority reached as far as the Luangwa River in the 17th century. His forces are said to have conquered the eastern Nsenga; however, their oral traditions have no memory of this, and it is possible they were vassals. (Note: Tradition says the invasion was led by Chimwala, Undi's nephew, who defeated Mundikula, leader of the Mwanza, the most prominent Nsenga clan. After this, Chimwala is said to have subjugated Chifuka, head of the Lungu clan, after which all other Nsenga submitted.) Chulu was either a son of the Kalonga and was sent north or left Undi during his migration, and settled in the southern Tumbuka lands of Chimaliro (in modern-day Kasungu District). By the end of the 17th century, Chulu had declined and been replaced by Mwase, traditionally an elephant hunter who had rid the community of dangerous animals and ended local conflicts.

A son of Kalonga, Mkadzula of the Mwale clan, left Mankhamba to settle in the Tonga lands (modern-day Salima District) and bore the title Kanyenda. He was initially accompanied with Kabunduli, who split from Mkadzula at Nkhotakota and is said to have united various Tonga groups under his control. Traditions on Mkanda Mbewe, possibly another son of Kalonga, differ, likely influenced by interactions with invaders in the 19th century. The first tradition says Mkanda was more important than Undi, saying that Undi walked while Mkanda was carried in a hammock, though other traditions say this was because of an injury. Some traditions say Mkanda was sent to Bunda, and later Kasungu. Accordingly, he left after a dispute with Mwase and settled in Mchinji after defeating Akafula warriors, only making contact with Undi after. However, traditions from Undi's area say Mkanda was sent to Mchinji by Undi, only becoming independent later. The Kalonga's power and wealth grew as relatives sent ivory as tribute, which was processed at Mankhamba.

The first Kaphiti and first Lundu had settled southwest either near Utale or the Wankurumadzi River (in modern-day Mwanza and Neno districts), coming to rule over the Chipeta (regional proto-Chewa) there. Kaphiti grew powerful, extending over the Lower Shire Valley, the Shire Highlands, Mulanje, and areas in modern-day Mozambique. Later, Lundu left to establish his own kingdom further south at Mbewe near Chiromo. Supported by the rainmaking cult of Mbona (Note: According to oral histories, Mbona was a historical figure who was innocently killed by the first Lundu, after which he revealed himself to have supernatural powers, particularly rainmaking, and was subsequently venerated (including by Lundu).) and controlling the Mbona shrine at Nsanje, his power grew to eclipse that of Kaphiti (who had disappeared by the 16th century) owing to wealth accumulated from trade along the Zambezi, and he extended his influence over the Lower Zambezi Valley. Lundu allied with the Zimba and expanded eastwards into Makua and Lolo lands, and some Makua and Lolo headmen were made tributaries alongside Maravi chiefs. The Zimba went on to defeat the Portuguese in 1592 and 1593.

The Maravi engaged in trade both locally and in the wider Indian Ocean trade. Muzura was a Kalonga revered in Portuguese records; his identity has been debated. Undi had the choice of the Kalonga's successors, and, according to Juwayeyi, Muzura was originally part of the royalty at Mano. Portuguese reports say that he led workers on a settler's plantation and was a renowned hunter. He aided the Portuguese in defeating the rivals of the Mwenemutapa, Gatsi Rusere, in 1608. Juwayeyi says that Muzura had a second capital in the Mwanza–Neno region, closer to the Zambezi, where, in 1616, he provided hospitality to Portuguese traveller Gaspar Bocarro, who wrote the first historical account of Maravi. In 1622, Muzura defeated Lundu with the help of the Portuguese, becoming the undisputed ruler of the region. Under Muzura, trade flourished and the Maravi grew very wealthy. In 1629, Muzura allied with Mwenemutapa Kapararidze, Gatsi Rusere's successor, aiming to expel the Portuguese from Zambezia. However, Muzura's attack on Quelimane was unsuccessful. Portuguese records in 1635 described Muzura as cunning and very powerful, and he died in the 1640s.

=== Decline and collapse ===
The Maravi empire began to decline and fragment in the 18th century as the system for succession broke down. The power of the Banda clan had grown since Undi and Nyangu had left Mankhamba, as a candidate for Kalonga required the approval of counsellors belonging to the Banda clan, leaving the Kalonga (belonging to the Phiri clan) relatively isolated. During the 18th century, Undi lost the role of appointing Kalongas as the counsellors assumed that responsibility. Undi's authority was further weakened by the Portuguese working gold deposits north of the Zambezi, who dealt with his lesser chiefs directly. By the turn of the 19th century, many Chewa, Pimbe, and Nsenga had broken away. At Mankhamba, despite the convenience of appointing Kalongas locally, powerful counsellors manipulated and abused the system. This was compounded by some territorial chiefs' dissatisfaction at not being permitted to sell ivory directly to foreign merchants. As territorial chiefs broke away and the Kalonga lost control over trade, the Yao people in what is now northern Mozambique opened new trade routes. Rather than following succession conventions, new Kalongas came to power via armed conflict, and there were many short reigns throughout this time. This included rulers not belonging to the Phiri clan, such as Mchepera of the Mwale clan and Kampini of the Mbewe clan. The Undi is said to have led a force to install his own royal line as Kalonga and depose Mkhwima, and while he was not successful, he continued to press his dynasty's claims. A deposed Kalonga, Khute, fled to one of the chiefdoms, splitting the state. Makewana is also said to have led revolts against the Kalonga after he raped one of her matsano, and was supported by Undi. In the late 18th or early 19th century, Mankhamba was abandoned.

From the early 19th century, the Yao led slave raids into the southern region around Lake Malawi, often using guns, which devastated Chewa communities. Slaves were sold to Arab or Swahili traders, and some Chewa chiefs engaged in the trade due to how profitable it was. Foreign traders dealt directly with lesser chiefs, empowering them and disrupting the hierarchical system of authority. The 1820s saw a great famine. Around 1837, the Maseko Ngoni arrived in the region from Mozambique, having fled the Mfecane, and also engaged in raiding the Chewa. The Chewa became a series of independent villages, militarily disorganised and often hostile to one another. During the Kalonga's decline, the northern polities of Mkanda, Mwase, and Kanyenda became more influential.

The last Kalonga was Sosola, who was of the Phiri clan and a descendant of Nyangu. With the help of four chiefs—three of which were Yao, with one called Mnanula—he defeated Kalonga Kampini, whose rule was said to be illegitimate as he was not of the Phiri clan, and usurped the title. The Yao chiefs began raiding the Maravi, which Sosola lacked the military capacity to prevent. Instead he made diplomatic efforts, but the Ngoni refused to help him. He turned to a Yao group led by Msamala and his son Mponda, who accepted his request and defeated the group led by Mnanula. However, they too began slave raiding, forcing Sosola to leave and settle near Mankhamba and Mnanula's settlement. Towards the end of the 1860s, a war broke out between Sosola and Mnanula, reportedly resulting in Mnanula shooting and killing Sosola, afterwards changing his name to Pemba in triumph. (Note: Robert Laws met Pemba over a decade after the battle, describing him as "tall, strongly built with a determined expression of countenance, who would not be likely to scruple about committing a cruel action to accomplish his ends".) This saw the end of the position of Kalonga. In 1864, a blind and old Lundu was killed by some Makololo chiefs who had accompanied David Livingstone on his Zambezi expedition. Two decades later, the region was colonised by the British, and the slave trade ended by the turn of the 20th century.

The Chewa Royal Establishment (or Chewa Kingdom), a non-sovereign monarchy seated in Katete in eastern Zambia and extending into Malawi and Mozambique, claims continuation of Undi's lineage and the Kalonga institution. The annual Kulamba festival, held in the last week of August, involves chiefs from Zambia, Malawi, and Mozambique convening at the paramount chief's palace to report to the Kalonga and defy colonial borders. Lundu's lineage also continues into modern times; from being a village headman in 1922, the Lundu was reinstated as the main traditional authority in the lower Shire Valley following Malawi's independence in 1964.

== Government ==
The state was headed by the Kalonga (king/paramount chief) of the Phiri clan. Titles were governed by the institutions of positional succession and perpetual kinship, which permanently linked political offices together in a network inspired by kinship systems. Originating in the Lunda Empire, positional succession is where the successor to a title takes on their predecessor's name, identity, and duties, while, as a consequence, perpetual kinship is where the successor inherits their predecessor's kinship relations. The latter meant that even chiefs of non-Chewa groups such as the Nsenga were regarded as (originally honorary) sons or nephews of Maravi leaders. Perpetual titles included Nyangu (reserved for either the Kalonga's mother or sister) and Mwali (Kalonga's principal wife, chosen from the Banda clan and descended from Makewana). (Note: Some traditions, particularly from descendants of the last Mwali, say that after the death of a Kalonga, it was Mwali who chose the successor by marrying them. A similar institution existed among the Luba, from where the Maravi had migrated.) As a matrilocal society, the Phiri clan was headed by Nyangu, who held the highest rank in the system, serving to check Kalonga's power. Makewana (or Mangadzi) was a priestess and rainmaker who was head of the Banda clan. Successors to the Kalonga had to be descendants of Nyangu, belong to the Phiri clan, and be approved by counsellors at Mankhamba who belonged to the Banda clan. Some other clans included the Mwale, Linde, Kwenda, Mbewe, and Mphadwe. The totem of the Phiri/Maravi was the baboon.

The state had regional chiefs called Mwini Dziko ("owner of the land"), and Kalonga gave some of the first chiefs a flywhisk, a sword or knife, and an iron stool as symbols of office. The Mwini Dziko delegated control to various sub-chiefs, who paid tribute to Kalonga, often in the form of ivory. The Kalonga consulted the Mwini Dziko, who in turn consulted court attendants or guardians (ankhoswe) and territorial chieftains (aphungu or mbili), who consulted lineage or village chiefs, who then consulted the people. Philosopher Grivas Kayange argues that this was a form of deliberative and agonistic democracy. Consensus was highly valued, as demonstrated by various proverbs, (Note: Such as "Nkhanga zidapangana kusadache", meaning "Guinea-fowls agreed/reached consensus before dawn" (ie. before making a decision), and "Nzeru zayekha adaviyika nsima m’madzi", meaning "Mr His-own wisdom dipped stiff-porridge into water" (encouraging consultation with others).) although people that were not members of the Nyau society were left out. The army was led by the Khombe, head of the Mwale clan. The Mkomba was the public executioner, and the Mgawi the land divider.

== Economy ==
The Maravi practised both pastoral and arable farming. They possibly grew sorghum, millet, beans, groundnuts, and dagga. Later, cassava, sweet potatoes, tobacco, and pumpkins were introduced via trade with the Portuguese. Cotton became popular to grow, with varieties including the indigenous thonje kaja and the foreign thonje manga. Animals raised for food included chickens cattle, goats, sheep, pigs and doves. Chickens were often used as a medium of exchange prior to the popularisation of money under colonial rule. Hunting was done in large groups utilising ulembe poison, with antelope a popular target. Fishing was also a common livelihood.

Mankhamba specialised in metallurgy, and the Maravi were well-known to groups including the Portuguese for their high-quality iron tools. Other than use for agriculture, iron tools were also used in manufacturing objects such as mats, mortars, pestles, drums, baskets, and canoes, according to Juwayeyi. Copper working was less common due to the lack of accessible copper deposits in the area. Other trades were house construction and the production of wicker objects, pottery, and cloth. Cloth included a type called dewere, made from bwazi; barkcloth made of mombo bark; and cotton cloth, which gradually replaced the others. There were two types of wicker ware: nkeka, made from mgwalangwa, and mphasa, made from bango. Pottery was commonly produced, and ceramic pots likely by women only. Ivory was also processed at Mankhamba.

The Maravi traded locally as well as engaging in the Indian Ocean trade. Glass beads from Europe and Asia were a popular import, with Indian ones being favoured over European ones. Copper objects were imported from modern-day Zambia and DR Congo, and copper was used as a medium of exchange. Due to the Maravi originating from the copper-rich area of Katanga, they were likely familiar with copper workings. Chinese porcelain dating to the 16th century has been uncovered at Mankhamba. The Maravi exported iron tools, especially to the Portuguese, and cotton cloth called machila, which was cheaper and often preferred to Indian cloth due to its durability. Salt from Lake Malawi was also traded to the interior. There were plenty of elephants in the area, and ivory was a popular trade good. Firearms imported in the 19th century contributed to a rapid growth in elephant hunting.

== Society and culture ==
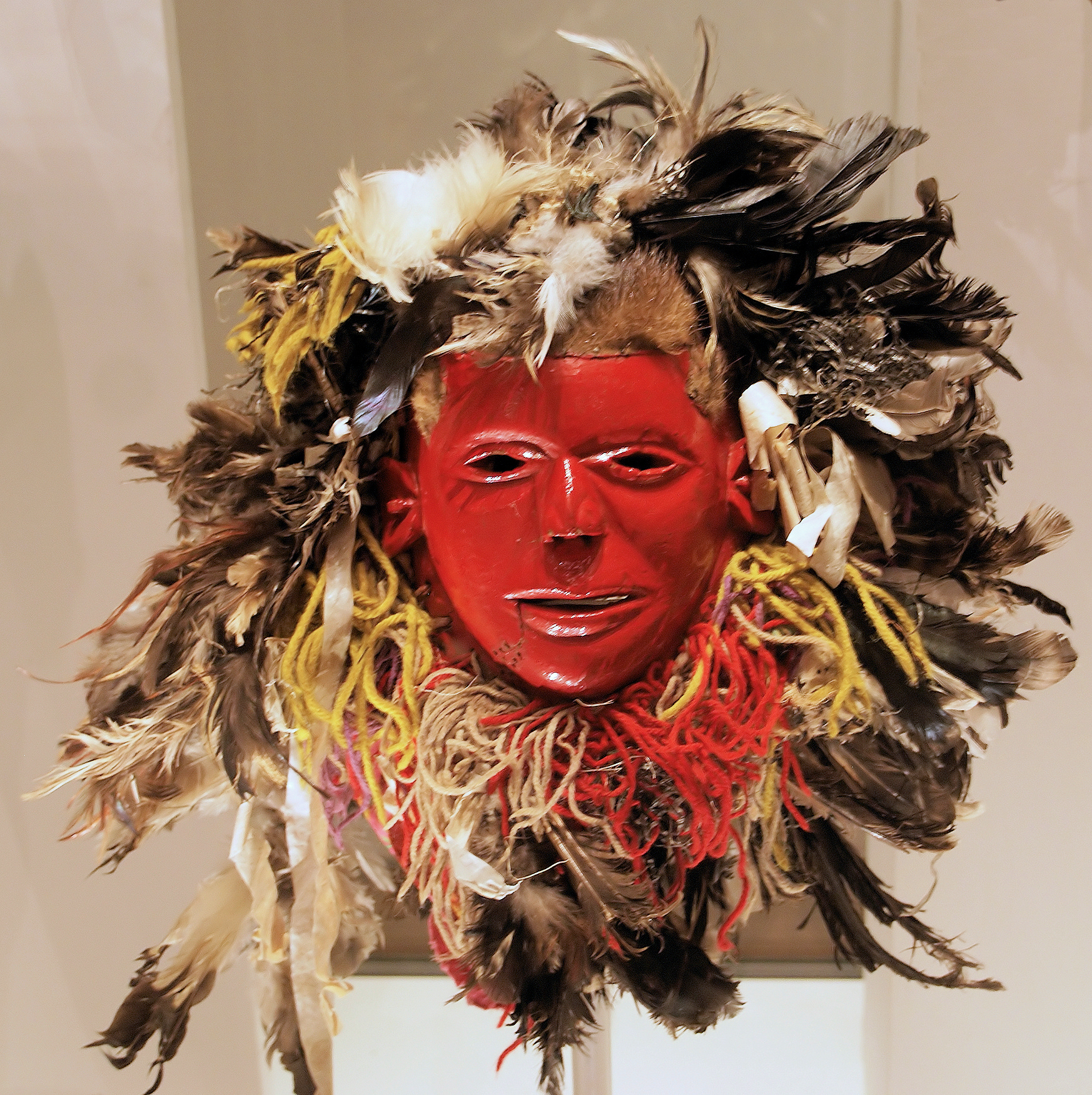
A mask for Nyau ceremonies

The Maravi utilised Chewa religious institutions to maintain the state's unity. While the Phiri clan held secular authority, the Banda clan was in charge of religious matters and held ritual authority, and were relied upon for the society's prosperity. Their head, priestess Makewana, was supported by Matsano (spirit wives) and members of the Mbewe clan. The Mlira ceremony involved the heads of ruling families visiting the capital every year, around September, to venerate the spirit of the Kalonga who had led the Maravi's migration, which took the physical form of a snake. The shrine at Kaphirintiwa Hill (which was dedicated to the god Chisumphi) had a sacred pool. Makewana, according to tradition, would disappear into it for days when calling for rain. The shrine also had a sacred drum (mbiriwiri) said to have been left by the Akafula when they were displaced. Only Tsang'oma ("Drum beater") of the Mwale clan was permitted to beat the drum, and drum playing was forbidden in Msinja. (Note: When the Msinja shrine was sacked by invaders in the 1860s, the tsang'oma left with mbiriwiri for Mozambique, where someone broke the drum. That person was reportedly killed and the drum repaired, which now sits at a shrine in a village called Tsang'oma.) Hill-top shrines were largely inaccessible and may have been a place of refuge from invaders. Mankhamba also had its own shrine (still in use) and sacred water pool, the latter of which was located 8 km (5 miles) away. Kamundi was a senior member of the Mbewe clan who, in rituals, fulfilled the role of Thunga (a snake deity). Two initiation rites were Chinamwali, which prepared women for motherhood, and Nyau, which prepared men for challenges in later life.

Similar to wicker ware uses in recent times, mphasa was possibly used to cover the dead, and nkeka by women as seats for socialising. Likewise, the two types of baskets, dengu/mtanga and lichero, were possibly primarily used by women, and the deepest basket, mseche, used to store beer for celebrations and other village events. It was very common to smoke dagga and later tobacco, and smoking pipes were often decorated. Cattle were viewed as symbols of wealth and status. Women prepared plant foods while men prepared meats. Dogs were raised for hunting and companionship, and hunters provided sacrifices and carried charms and medicines for good luck and safety. Jewellery uncovered by archaeological research includes glass beads, copper rings, copper necklaces, and ivory bangles.

== List of rulers ==
The following is a list of rulers from 1988 according to Kings M. Phiri, a Malawian historian who researched the Maravi. He lamented the unsuitability of generational averaging in this case due to ambiguity surrounding the succession system. (Note: In African historiography, due to oral traditions rarely incorporating dates regnal lists tend to be used to establish chronologies and obtain approximate dates. This is done via applying an arbitrary average reign, usually taken to be 27 years.) After the early 18th century, there is great variation in traditions.

N.	Ruler	Approximate reign	Notes
1	Chinkhole or Mazizi	1480–1505	
2	Chidzonzi	1505–1530	
3	Chinsangu	1530–1555	
3	Mphunga	1555–1580	
4	Mkung'untha	1580–1605	
5	Mchepera	1605–1630	Portuguese records have Muzura as Kalonga at this time; however, Chewa traditions had no record of a Kalonga with that name
6	Kamtukule	1630–1655	
7	Mkhwima	1655–1680	
8	Khute	1680–1705	
9	Mziitsa	1705–1730	
...			

The Chewa Royal Establishment, a non-sovereign monarchy centred in eastern Zambia, claims continuation of Undi's lineage and the Kalonga institution. Its ruler list has Chidzonzi succeeded by Muzura, who, according to tradition, usurped the title and caused the first Undi to leave. After a series of short and unstable reigns, the first Undi is said to have taken the title after Sosola's death. Fourteen Kalonga Gawa Undis follow, with the holder as of 2016 being Kalonga Gawa Undi Mkhomo V.
