= Nsenga people =

Ethnic group in Africa

The Nsenga, not to be confused with the Senga who are part of lager Tumbuka people group, are a Bantu ethnic tribe of Zambia and Mozambique. In Zambia, they are found in two districts of Eastern province, namely, Nyimba and Petauke. They are also dialects with the Nsenga Luzi of the Luangwa valley in Chief Nyalugwe, Mboloma and Lwembe and the Chikunda of Luangwa Boma (Feira).

Their Senior Chief is Kalindawalo M'ndikula, who resides in Merwe 10 kilometers from Petauke Boma. The following are Nsenga Chiefs: Chiefs Mwape, Nyamphande, Nyanje, Mumbi, Sandwe, Nyalugwe, Ndake, Senior Chief Lwembe, Senior Chief Mboloma and Mwanjaw'anthu.

They are known for their culture and artwork which includes bead work and basketry. They also grow groundnuts, maize, millet and sorghum for consumption and cotton as cash crop.

== Origin ==
The Nsenga people are believed to have migrated into Zambia around the 14th century from the Luba – Lunda kingdom of Congo, the current Democratic Republic of Congo, as distinct language. Nsenga means journey in reference to the tribe's long trek from Luba Kingdom. The Nsenga people share much more same culture with the lala, Lamba, Aushi, Swaka, Bemba and Bisa people due to strong historical links to the same pattern of migration movements as the lamba, swaka, Bemba lala and Bisa speaking people as they left Luba Kingdom in search for more fertile land.

A typical vocabulary analysis on selected tribes with links to theLuba Kingdom, further proves that Nsenga was indeed a distinct language and clearly dispels the assumption that Nsenga could have been an off short of Chewa speaking people. Nsenga people originate from Luba Kingdom alongside other tribes such as lala, Bemba, lamba and the Bisa people. The Nsenga people are among the earliest tribes to migrate into modern day Zambia after the Tonga speaking people. It is believed that the Nsenga speaking people embarked on the trekking journey (Nsenga) almost at the same time with Bemba, Bisa, Lala. During this long journey, the Nsenga people had an intimate encounter with the Bemba people. Under the instruction of their leader Chitimukulu, the Bemba fighters ambushed a beautiful Nsenga woman (Lumbwe) whom Chitimukulu took as one of his wives upon capture. In retaliation, the Nsenga hunters were also ordered by heads of family clans (Tumvi) to hunt down Bemba women. At the time the Nsenga people had no Chiefs but organised under clan system of governance such as "enetembo, enemwanza, eneng'oma, enelungu, enemumba, enemvula" headed by Tumvi. It was this hide and seek tribal game, captivity of Bemba and Nsenga women that produced some similarities. Today, we have, for instance, some Bemba names such as Nkonde, Mwape, Ngosa (Nsenga call Ngoza), Lumbwe among the Nsenga people. While the Bembas will greet their visitors "mulishani", the Nsenngas will do the same by saying "mulityani). These are some of the many dialect similarities between the two tribes.
