= Mankhamba =

Archaeological site in Malawi

- Location within Malawi Location within Africa
- 14°12′S 34°30′E
- Type: Settlement
- Cultures: Maravi
- Location: Dedza District, Malawi
- Part of: Maravi Empire

History
- Built: 13th century CE
- Abandoned: Late-18th or early-19th century

Mankhamba is an archaeological site in Malawi. It was the capital of the Maravi Empire. It was settled from around the 13th century and abandoned in the late-18th or early-19th century.

The capital of Mankhamba led a confederacy whose influence extended from the Indian Ocean of Mozambique to present-day Zambia, and from southern Tanzania to the Zambezi River valley.
