= Chewa people =

Ethnic group from Southern and Central Africa

Chewa
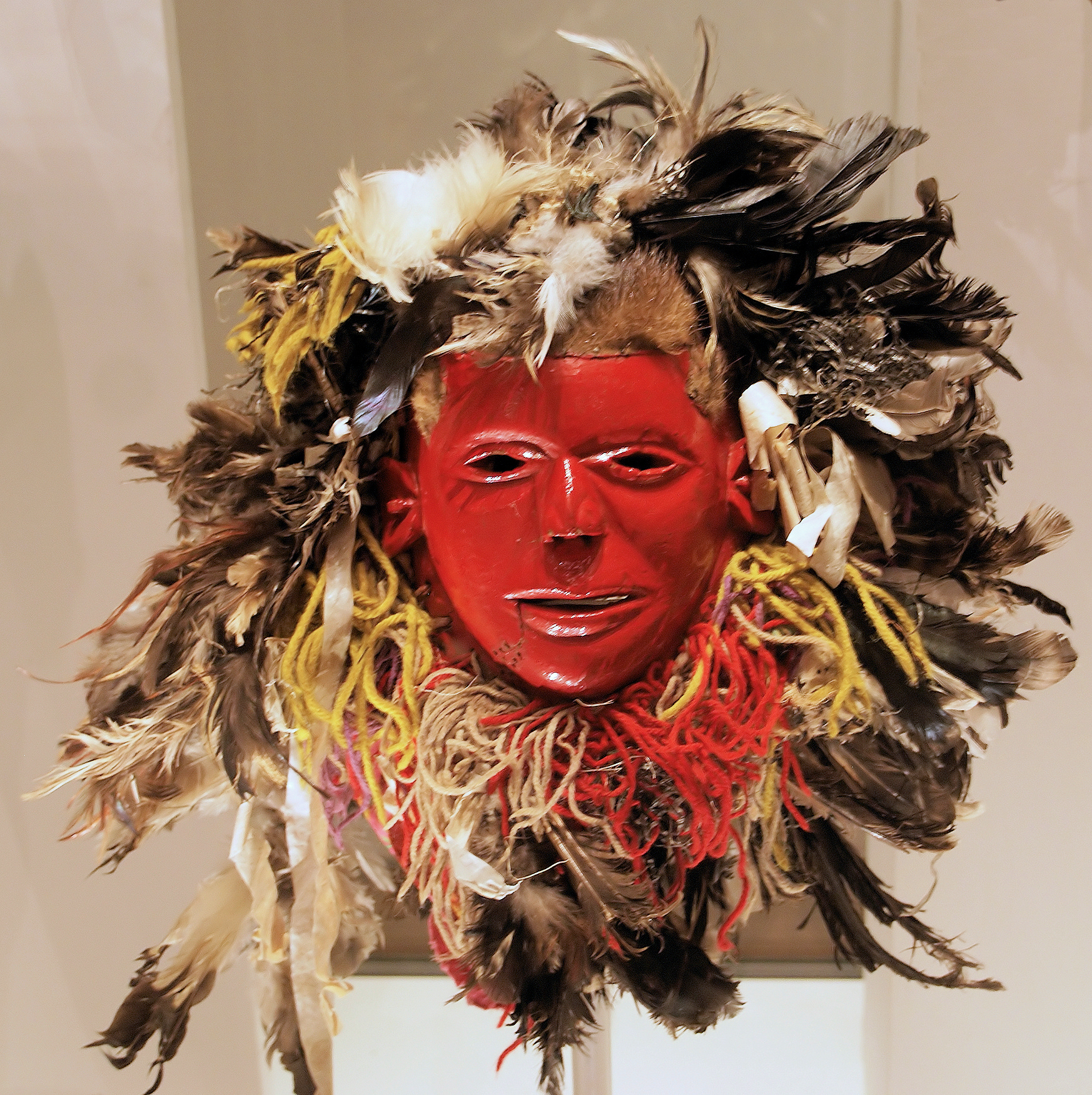
- Late 20th-century wood, paint, feathers, metal and wool mask from the Chewa people in Malawi in the British Museum

Regions with significant populations
- Malawi: 7,270,000 (2020)

Languages
- Chewa, English, Portuguese

Religion
- Christianity, traditional Chewa religion, Islam

Related ethnic groups
- Tumbuka, Tonga, Kunda, Sena, Nyungwe

- Person: MChewa
- People: AChewa
- Language: Chichewa
- Country: Uchewa

The Chewa are a Bantu ethnic group primarily found in Malawi and Zambia, with few populations in Mozambique. The Chewa are closely related to people in surrounding regions such as the Tumbuka. As with the Nsenga and Tumbuka, a small part of Chewa territory came under the influence of the Ngoni, who were of South African origin. Their language is called Chewa. The Chewa are mainly known for their masks and their secret societies, called Nyau. Members of the Nyau brotherhood are responsible for the initiation of young men into adulthood, and for the performance of the Gule Wamkulu at the end of the initiation procedure, celebrating the young men’s integration into adult society.

The Chewa (Mang'anja) are a remnant of the Maravi people.

There are two large Chewa clans, the Phiri and Banda, with a population of 1.5 million people. The Phiri are associated with the kings and aristocracy, the Banda with healers and mystics.

== History ==
Oral records of the Chewa may be interpreted to refer to origins in Malambo, a region in the Luba area of the Democratic Republic of the Congo, from where they emigrated into northern Zambia, and then south and east into the highlands of Malawi.

Oral history has it that the first Chewa kingdom was established some time before or after 1480, and by the 16th century there were two systems of government, one maintained by the Banda clan at Mankhamba (near Nthakataka), and the other by the Phiri clan at Manthimba.

By the 17th century, when the 'Malawi' state had been unified, the Portuguese had made some contact with the Chewa. Although the Portuguese did not reach the heartland of the chiefdom, there are well-documented records of contacts between 1608 and 1667. By 1750, several 'Malawi' dynasties had consolidated their positions in different parts of central Malawi; however the Chewa, had managed to distinguish themselves from their neighbours through language, by having special tattoo marks (mphini), and by the possession of a religious system based on the nyau secret societies. During colonial time British and Portuguese missions have converted many to Christianity but at least one fifth (20%) of all Chewa are Muslims today. Despite the influence of Christianity and Islam a good number of Chewa still hold to their ancestral belief system.

== Culture ==
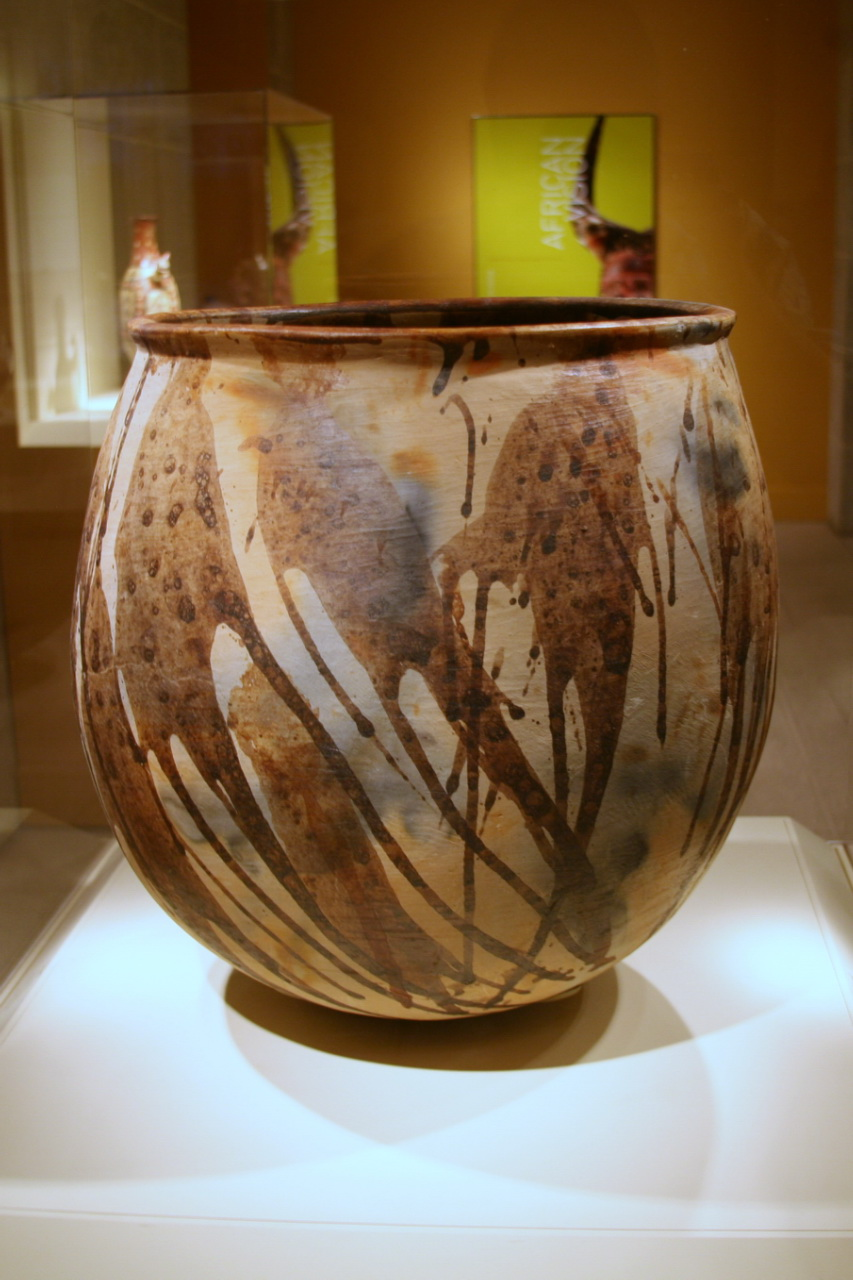
Large ovoid vessel made by a Chewa woman in National Museum of African Art

Women have a special place in Chewa society and belief. They are recognized as reproducers of the lineage (Bele), which is an extended family of people related to the same ancestor. As a matrilineal society, property and land rights are inherited through the mother. Bele means "descended from the same breast". Children of the same mother or female (Lubele la achite) make up a family of dependents or Mbumba. Elder brothers of the mothers are called Nkhoswe, are the guardians of the lineage, and are mentors to their sisters' sons.

When crops are sold, income from the sale belongs to the woman of the house.

The village is led by a headman (Mfumu), a position to which every villager of good character could aspire. Village headmen and head women were subordinate to regional chiefs (Mwini Dziko), who were themselves subordinate to Paramount Chiefs. Subordination meant the regular payment of tribute, as well as readiness to supply men in time of war.

== Population growth ==
The population of the Chewa ethnic group numbers at 7.9 million per 2024 estimate.

== Notable individuals ==
- Hastings Banda
- Lazarus Chakwera
- Justin Malewezi
- John Tembo
- Felix Mlusu
- Aaron Gadama
- Jessie Kabwila-Kapasula
- Isabel Apawo Phiri
