= Ntcheu District =

District of Malawi

Coordinates: 14°45′S 34°45′E

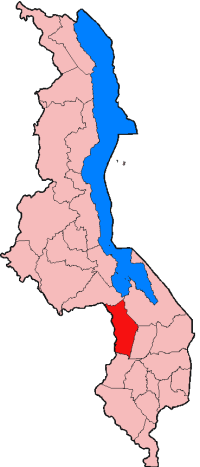
Location of Ntcheu District in Malawi

Ntcheu is a district in the Central Region of Malawi. It borders with the country of Mozambique. The district headquarters is Ntcheu, known as BOMA in the local language, but is most commonly called Mphate. It is run by Yeneya, the village headman. The district covers an area of 3,424 km.² and has a population of 659,608 people according to the 2018 Malawi Population and Housing Census. The Ntcheu district lies around halfway between Malawi's majors cities of Blantyre and Lilongwe - the capital city.

== Government and administrative divisions ==
There are seven National Assembly constituencies in Ntcheu:

- Ntcheu - Bwanje North
- Ntcheu - Bwanje South
- Ntcheu - Central
- Ntcheu - North
- Ntcheu - North East
- Ntcheu - South
- Ntcheu - West

== Cities and towns ==
- Ntcheu is the largest town or city in Ntcheu District.
- Nsipe lies 20 km on the route to Blantyre.
- Kasinje lies on the lake-shore road near Salima district.
- Lizulu is the headquarters of the Ngoni people, who are dominant in the district.
- Mphepozinai lies 15 km on the road to Kasinje.
- Mulangeni lies on the edge of the Mozambique border.

Chigodi lies 61 kilometers north east of the headquarters.

== Culture ==
Most of the occupants of the Ntcheu District are of the Ngoni people, and are therefore descendants of Eswatini's Swazi people and the Zulu of South Africa. Also, because of their location, they are connected to the Ngoni People of the Mzimba District located in the northern part of Malawi. The paramount Chief is Inkosi Yamakosi Gomani V (see List of rulers of the Ngoni Dynasty of Maseko (Gomani)). The traditional Authorities are Njolomole, Kalumbu, Kwataine, Ganya, Makwangwala, Chakhumbira, Mpando, Champiti, Phambala, and Masasa.

== Places of interest ==
- Mama's restaurant is a popular destination for people in Ntcheu.
- Gowa Mission School

== Demographics ==
According to 2008 Malawi population census, people aged 18 and over distributed by Traditional Authority, were populated as follows:

- Phambala 55,168
- Mpando 50,528
- Kwataine (Now Makwangwala) 41,338
- Sub Chief (S/C) Champiti 15,790
- Njolomole/Kalumbu 54,527
- Chakhumbira 25,659
- S/C Goodson Ganya 106,910
- Masasa 24,691
- Mphate 14,680
- Mberengwa 726

=== Ethnic groups ===
At the time of the 2018 Census of Malawi, the distribution of the population of Ntcheu District by ethnic group was as follows:

- 90.4% Ngoni
- 3.3% Lomwe
- 2.3% Chewa
- 2.3% Yao
- 0.6% Sena
- 0.3% Mang'anja
- 0.3% Tumbuka
- 0.1% Nyanja
- 0.1% Tonga
- 0.1% Nkhonde
- 0.1% Lambya
- 0.0% Sukwa
- 0.2% Others

== Resources ==
The district is well known for its vegetable production like cabbages, tomatoes and potatoes at Njolomole, Lizulu, and Tsangano. Apart from this main road of M1, Ntcheu district is also well connected with other districts on the Lake shore using Kasinje road (M5) to the Lake shore road going through Golomoti, Chipoka, Nkhotakota, and Nkhata bay districts.

== Politics ==
With the dawn of multiparty politics in 1994 in Malawi, Ntcheu District may be regarded as a swing district with respect to the three major parties in Malawi: the Alliance for Democracy (AFORD), the United Democratic Front (UDF) and the Malawi Congress Party (MCP).

== Education ==
With the arrival of the religious missionaries in the district in the 19th Century, many Christian religious schools were created, such as, Gowa Mission School, Mlanda Mission School, Muluma Mission School, and the Dombole Mission school. With the development of these schools, this gave the advantage of increased education to the district. Private schools in the area include the New Era Girls Secondary School.

== Notable Malawians from Ntcheu ==
- Gomani II (Inkosi ya Makosi - Chief of Chiefs)
- Gomani V

=== Academics ===
- Brown Chiphamba
- Rodney Witman Lunduka

=== Government ===
- Saulos Chilima
- Jane Ansah
- Hellen Singh was born in Ntcheu District in about 1944.
- Loti Dzonzi
- Focus Gwede
- Sam Mpasu
- Percy Kachipande
- Kelly Zidana
- Hereford Machewere
- Robert Jiva

=== Entertainers ===
- Angela Mizinga "Tigris"

=== Business ===
- Nathan Kalumbu
- Bashir Dawood Adams

=== Civil Society ===
- George Jobe
- Anderson Kayenda
