= Percy Kachipande =

Malawian politician, diplomat (born 1944)

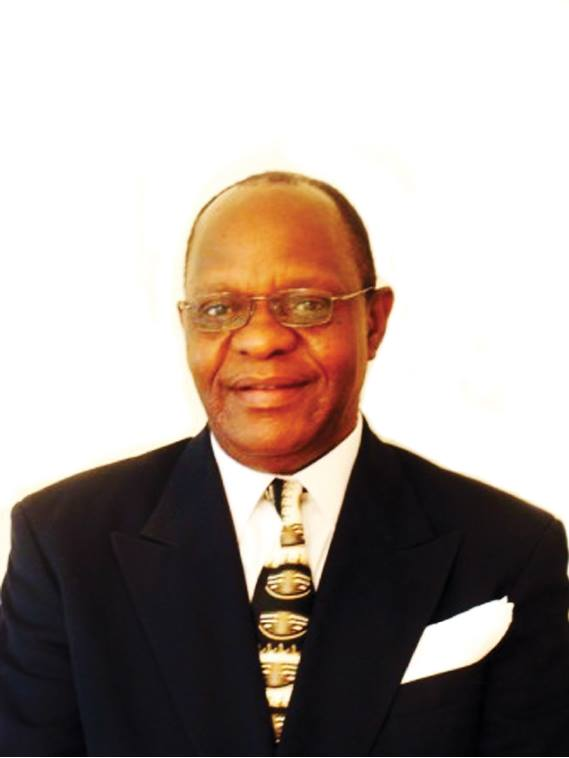
- Born: Safiel Percy Kachipande; 16 February 1944 (age 82); Ntcheu, Nyasaland
- Occupations: Politician; diplomat
- Spouse: Florence Ngosi
- Children: 6

Safiel Percy Kachipande (born 16 February 1944) is a Malawian politician and former diplomat.

Kachipande is a former civil servant and diplomat for Malawi diplomatic missions to Germany, US and South Africa. He was the deputy ambassador and later, the acting ambassador to the Malawian mission in South Africa during Malawi's and South Africa's democratic reforms.

== Career ==
=== Early career ===
His career as a civil servant began in 1966. He began working as the District Commissioner for Thyolo District, Blantyre District, Lilongwe District, Rumphi District and Dedza District, Zomba District. In 1975, he began working as Project Manager on Malawi Railway's Malawi-Canada Railway Development project up until 1980. This Canadian International Development Agency (CIDA) sponsored infrastructure development project began in 1974 and ended in 1979 building 70 miles of new track from Salima to Lilongwe Soon after this project, Malawi began to pressure CIDA for a further extension to build a direct link from Lilongwe to Mchinji, near the Zambian border.

=== Diplomatic career ===
He moved to Europe in 1980 to work as the First Secretary at the Malawian Embassy in Bonn in the former West Germany. He then moved to Wolf Trap, Virginia, and later McLean, Virginia in the United States, where he worked in the Malawian Embassy in Washington D.C. From 1987-1989, he worked as a Consular officer for the Malawian permanent mission to the United Nations in New York. During this time, him and his family lived first in Scarsdale, NY and later New Rochelle, NY

Kachipande moved to South Africa, at the end of 1989. He served as the Deputy Ambassador and later Acting Ambassador and Chargé d'affaires during the apartheid era in South Africa. Due to his determination to pursue top quality education for his family, one of his daughters became the first black student to attend and hence integrate Pretoria High School for Girls (PHSG) during the apartheid era where schools were legally separated by race. PHSG thus became the first all-white public school in the province of Northern Transvaal (now Gauteng) to integrate under the leadership of headmistress Anne Van Zyl. In South Africa, he worked as a UN observer during South Africa's first democratic election process, helping to ensure free and fair elections. He played a key role in ensuring continued diplomatic relations between Malawi and the new ANC government during the transition period in South Africa. Diplomatic relations between Malawi and South Africa had been unstable because Malawi was the only African country with a Black majority government (the other being White minority-ruled Rhodesia under Prime Minister Ian Smith), to have diplomatic ties with South Africa throughout the apartheid era. Nelson Mandela's first trip to Malawi after his release from jail and prior to becoming the president of South Africa assured continued relationships between the two countries. In 1992, Malawi was also transitioning to a multi-party democracy and changing oppressive laws under Kamuzu Banda.

=== Late career ===
After moving back to Malawi in 1994 and began working as the Deputy Principal Secretary with the Ministry of Justice and Constitutional Affairs and later the Ministry of Education, Science and Techcology. He was on the board of directors of the Designated Schools Board. He then retired as a civil servant in Malawi but continued to serve the public as a private citizen. He currently a farmer and co-owner of a family business in Ntcheu which he owns with his wife.

=== Political career ===
He ran two campaigns for parliamentary seats in the 2004 and 2009 parliamentary elections for Ntcheu West. The results of which were being contested due to alleged irregularities during elections. During the 2004 elections, he was a front contender for the Ntcheu West MP seat, where he reportedly won 3420 votes to secure the elections only to be told later that he lost the seat by 3 "miscounted" and misplaced votes.

He was contesting for MP for Ntcheu-West in the 2014 elections.

== Philanthropy ==
He has worked on charity projects to help coordinate boreholes and orphan feeding centers in Ntcheu District.

== Personal life ==
He was born in Chimasula Village, under Town Authority Kwataine, in Ntcheu, Nyasaland in 1944. He is married to Florence Ngosi from Karonga, Malawi and has six children.
