= Malawi–Zimbabwe relations =

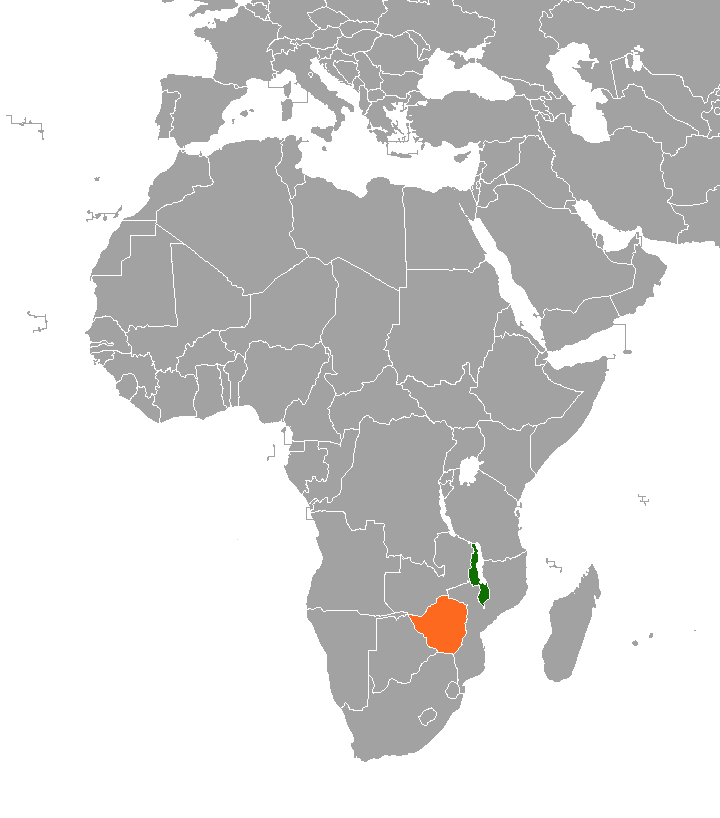

- Malawi: Zimbabwe

Malawi and Zimbabwe have had a close history for a long time. They share common values, history and culture. Along with Zambia, they were one country under the Federation of Rhodesia and Nyasaland. Malawi has a large Zimbabwean diaspora and Zimbabwe has a large Malawian diaspora.

== Malawi–Zimbabwe Joint Permanent Commission of Cooperation (JPCC) ==
Malawi and Zimbabwe have a Joint Permanent Commission of Cooperation (JPCC) that has met for the past nine years.

== Maize debt ==
Malawi sold $20 million worth of Zimbabwean borrowed money to purchase maize from Malawi under the Bingu wa Mutharika administration in 2011, that was not repaid.

== Land reform ==
When Malawi assumed the chair of the Southern African Development Community (SADC) in 2001, Muluzi took an active role in SADC on issues such as land reform in Zimbabwe.

== See also ==
- Foreign relations of Malawi
- Foreign relations of Zimbabwe
