= Israel–Malawi relations =

- Israel: Malawi

Malawi and Israel established diplomatic relations in July 1964 and have continued relations since. In September 2020, Malawian President Lazarus Chakwera announced that Malawi would open a diplomatic mission in Jerusalem.

== Banda era foreign policy ==
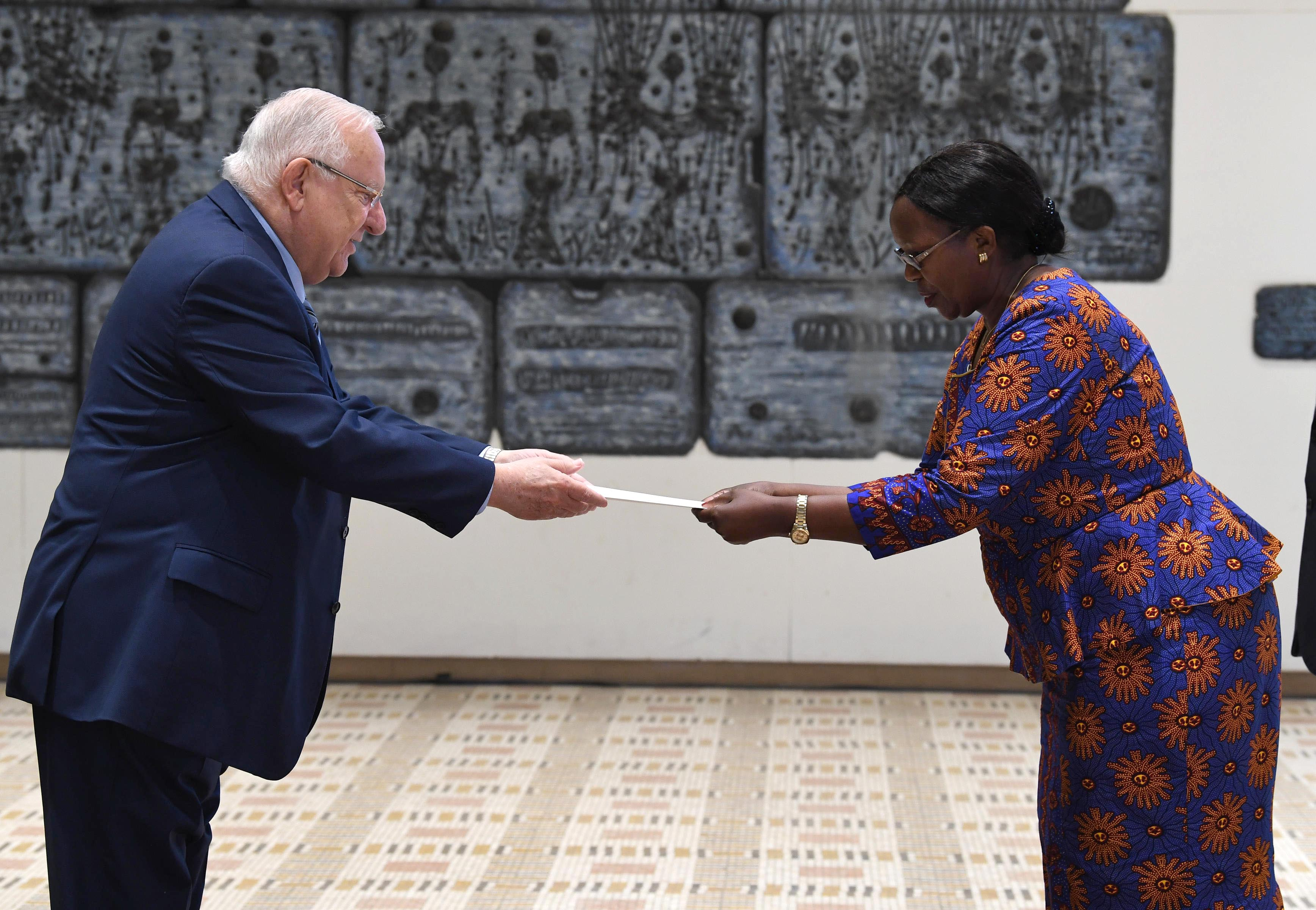
Israeli president Reuven Rivlin accepting credentials from Malawi ambassador

Malawi has maintained relations with Israel since 1964. Many African countries suspended diplomatic relations in favor of relations with the Arab states, where oil, trade, and financial aid would be beneficial to them. Malawi under Kamuzu Banda's foreign policy was one of only three Sub-Saharan African countries (the others being Lesotho and Swaziland) that continued to maintain full diplomatic relations with Israel after the Yom Kippur War in 1973. Israel has assisted Malawi with a few social and economic development programs.

== Post-Banda relations ==
Israel continues a relationship with Malawi on a non-residential basis. In November 2020, Malawi announced that it will become the first African country in decades to open its embassy to Israel in the capital Jerusalem. Malawian Foreign Minister Eisenhower Mkaka made the announcement during a trip to Israel, calling the decision a “bold and significant step.” In April 2024, Malawi Foreign Minister Nancy Tembo and Israeli Foreign Minister Israel Katz celebrated the opening of the permanent Malawi's embassy in Israel in Tel Aviv.

During the Gaza war, Malawi sent over 200 young workers to work on Israeli farms, with the potential to send up to 5,000. They are being paid around $1,500 per month USD. The deal is viewed by Malawians and Israelis alike a beneficial to both countries, as Malawi faces an economic crisis and Israeli faces labor shortage due to the war.

== See also ==
- Foreign relations of Israel
- Foreign relations of Malawi
