= Malawian passport =

Passport issued to Malawi citizens

- Malawian passport front cover
- Type: Passport
- Issued by: Malawi
- Purpose: Identification
- Eligibility: Malawian citizenship

The Malawian passport is issued to citizens of Malawi for international travel.

As of 1 January 2017, Malawian citizens had visa-free or visa on arrival access to 67 countries and territories, ranking the Malawian passport 70th in terms of travel freedom (tied with Belarusian and Lesotho passports) according to the Henley visa restrictions index.

Malawi introduced biometric passports (e-passports) in 2019, contracting with UAE-based Techno Brain for US$60 million over three years. The contract was terminated by the government of Malawi in December 2021 citing allegations of corruption and a desire to consult a local company in order to reduce passport fees. Techno Brain alleged that the real reason the contract was cancelled was for the government to avoid paying overdue charges, stating that they were locked out by the authorities from passport production infrastructure and that one of their engineers had been put under house arrest and prohibited to leave the country to serve as "human bait". However, the inability to find a new supplier prompted a supply crisis, with Techno Brain being used on an interim basis for people who needed to travel abroad urgently. Materials shortages and lack of outstanding bill payment continued to affect production, forcing it to be scaled down repeatedly. Additionally, in February 2024, passport issuance was halted due to an alleged cyberattack; however, anonymous sources stated that no attackers had requested ransom and that Techno Brain shut down the system due to suspicious activity from government agents, asking for millions of dollars in compensation. A local supplier, E-Tech, was selected to issue passports, doing so temporarily until the next round of procurement. In February 2025, India-based Madras Security Printers was selected by the government to supply passports over a five year period at a cost of US$30 million. The firm took over operations in August 2025, reportedly producing over 1,000 passports that month with the eventual capacity to produce 2,000 daily in response to backlogged applications, which had grown to more than 100,000. In September, the government also introduced an online application process, with digital payment in the pipeline.

== See also ==
- Visa requirements for Malawian citizens
- List of passports
