= Malawi–Uganda relations =

Malawian – Ugandan relations
- Malawi: Uganda

Malawi and Uganda have had diplomatic relations since 1964 at the national level. They have relationships at the regional and multilateral levels as well. Both countries are members of the African Union, Commonwealth of Nations, Non-Aligned Movement and Group of 77.

== Trade ==
Trade between Malawi and Uganda remains low.

== See also ==
- Foreign relations of Malawi
- Foreign relations of Uganda
