= List of diplomatic missions of Malawi =

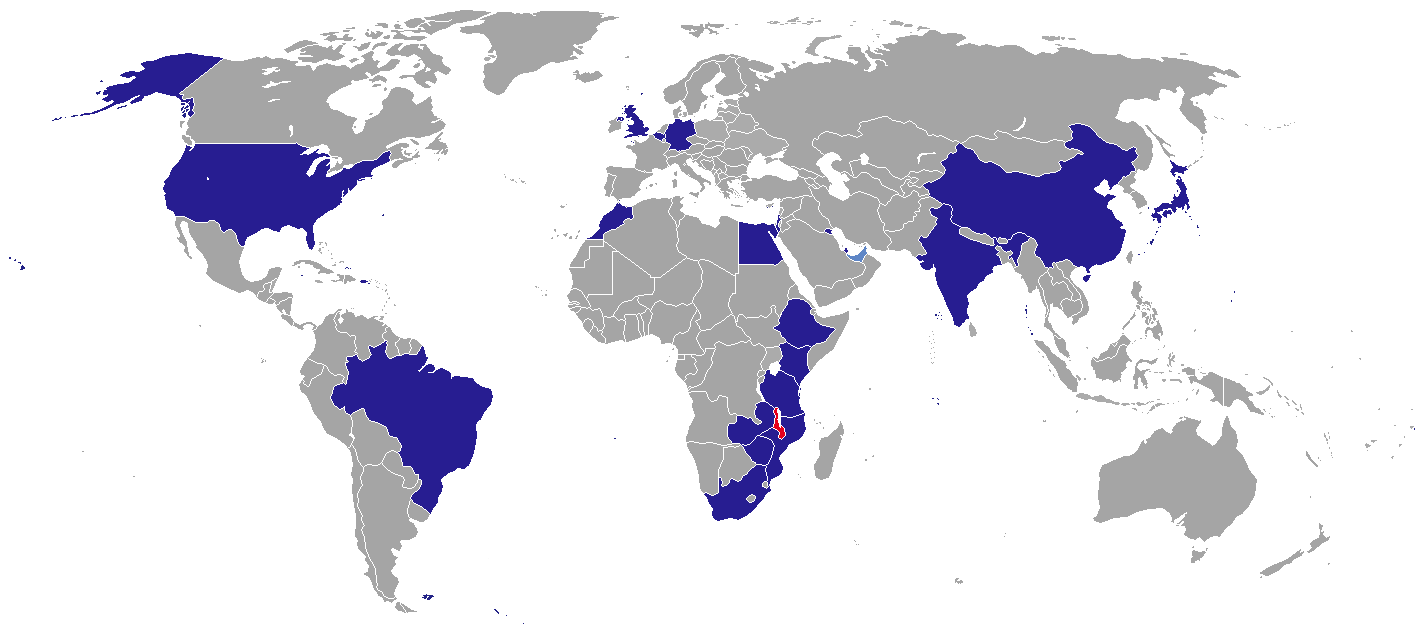
Location of diplomatic missions of Malawi

This is a list of diplomatic missions of Malawi.

Malawi's Former President Muluzi continued the pro-Western foreign policy established by his predecessor, Hastings Banda. It maintains excellent diplomatic relations with principal Western countries.

Honorary consulates are excluded from this listing.

== Current missions ==
=== Africa ===
Host country	Host city	Mission	Concurrent accreditation	Ref.
Egypt	Cairo	Embassy	Countries: Algeria; Iran; Jordan; Lebanon; Libya; Palestine; Sudan; Syria; Tunisia	
Ethiopia	Addis Ababa	Embassy	Countries: Benin; Burkina Faso; Cameroon; Cape Verde; Chad; Djibouti; Equatorial Guinea; Gabon; Gambia; Ghana; Guinea-Bissau; Ivory Coast; Liberia; Mali; Mauritania; Niger; Nigeria; Sahrawi Republic; Senegal; Sierra Leone; South Sudan; Togo; International Organizations: African Union; United Nations Economic Commission for Africa	
Kenya	Nairobi	High Commission	Countries: Central African Republic; Eritrea; Somalia; Uganda; International Organizations: United Nations; United Nations Environment Programme; United Nations Human Settlements Programme	
Morocco	Rabat	Embassy		
Morocco	Laayoune	Consulate-General		
Mozambique	Maputo	High Commission	Countries: Eswatini; Madagascar	
Mozambique	Tete	Consulate-General	Countries: Eswatini; Madagascar	
South Africa	Pretoria	High Commission	Countries: Botswana; Lesotho; Mauritius; Namibia; International Organizations: Southern African Development Community	
South Africa	Johannesburg	Consulate-General	Countries: Botswana; Lesotho; Mauritius; Namibia; International Organizations: Southern African Development Community	
Tanzania	Dar es Salaam	High Commission	Countries: Burundi; Comoros; Rwanda; Seychelles	
Zambia	Lusaka	High Commission	Countries: Angola; Congo-Brazzaville; Congo-Kinshasa; International Organizations: Common Market for Eastern and Southern Africa	
Zimbabwe	Harare	Embassy		

=== Americas ===
Host country	Host city	Mission	Concurrent accreditation	Ref.
Brazil	Brasília	Embassy	Countries: Antigua and Barbuda; Argentina; Barbados; Belize; Bolivia; Chile; Colombia; Costa Rica; Cuba; Dominican Republic; Ecuador; El Salvador; Grenada; Guatemala; Haiti; Honduras; Jamaica; Nicaragua; Panama; Paraguay; Peru; Saint Kitts and Nevis; Saint Lucia; Saint Vincent and the Grenadines; Trinidad and Tobago; Uruguay; Venezuela	
United States	Washington, D.C.	Embassy	Countries: Bahamas; Canada; Mexico	

=== Asia ===
Host country	Host city	Mission	Concurrent accreditation	Ref.
China	Beijing	Embassy	Countries: Cambodia; Indonesia; Malaysia; Mongolia; North Korea; Singapore; Thailand; Vietnam; Consular jurisdiction only: (Note: The following are listed only under the consular jurisdiction of the Malawian embassy in Beijing. As of 2026, none of them have yet to establish formal diplomatic relations with Malawi.); Bhutan; Laos	
China	Changsha	Consulate-General	Countries: Cambodia; Indonesia; Malaysia; Mongolia; North Korea; Singapore; Thailand; Vietnam; Consular jurisdiction only: Bhutan; Laos	
India	New Delhi	High Commission	Countries: Bangladesh; Maldives; Myanmar; Nepal; Sri Lanka; Consular jurisdiction only: (Note: Afghanistan is listed only under the consular jurisdiction of the Malawian high commission in New Delhi. As of 2026, both countries have yet to establish formal diplomatic relations.); Afghanistan	
Israel	Tel Aviv	Embassy		
Japan	Tokyo	Embassy	Countries: Australia; Brunei; Fiji; New Zealand; Papua New Guinea; Philippines; Samoa; South Korea	
Kuwait	Kuwait City	Embassy	Countries: Bahrain; Iraq; Oman; Pakistan; Saudi Arabia; United Arab Emirates; Yemen	
Qatar	Doha	Embassy	Countries: Azerbaijan	
United Arab Emirates	Dubai	Consulate-General (Note: Subordinate to the embassy in Kuwait City.)		

=== Europe ===
Host country	Host city	Mission	Concurrent accreditation	Ref.
Belgium	Brussels	Embassy	Countries: Andorra; France; Italy; Luxembourg; Monaco; Netherlands; International Organizations: European Union; Food and Agriculture Organization; International Fund for Agricultural Development; Organisation for the Prohibition of Chemical Weapons; UNESCO; World Food Programme	
Germany	Berlin	Embassy	Countries: Albania; Armenia; Austria; Belarus; Bosnia and Herzegovina; Bulgaria; Croatia; Czechia; Estonia; Georgia; Greece; Holy See; Hungary; Kosovo; Lithuania; Montenegro; North Macedonia; Poland; Romania; Russia; Serbia; Slovakia; Slovenia; Turkey; Ukraine	
United Kingdom	London	High Commission	Countries: Denmark; Finland; Iceland; Ireland; Malta; Norway; Portugal; Spain; Sweden; International Organizations: Commonwealth of Nations	

=== Multilateral organisations ===
Organization	Host city	Host country	Mission	Concurrent accreditation	Ref.
United Nations	New York City	United States	Permanent Mission	International Organizations: World Bank	
United Nations	Geneva	Switzerland	Permanent Mission	Countries: Cyprus; Switzerland; International Organizations: World Health Organization; World Trade Organization	

== Gallery ==
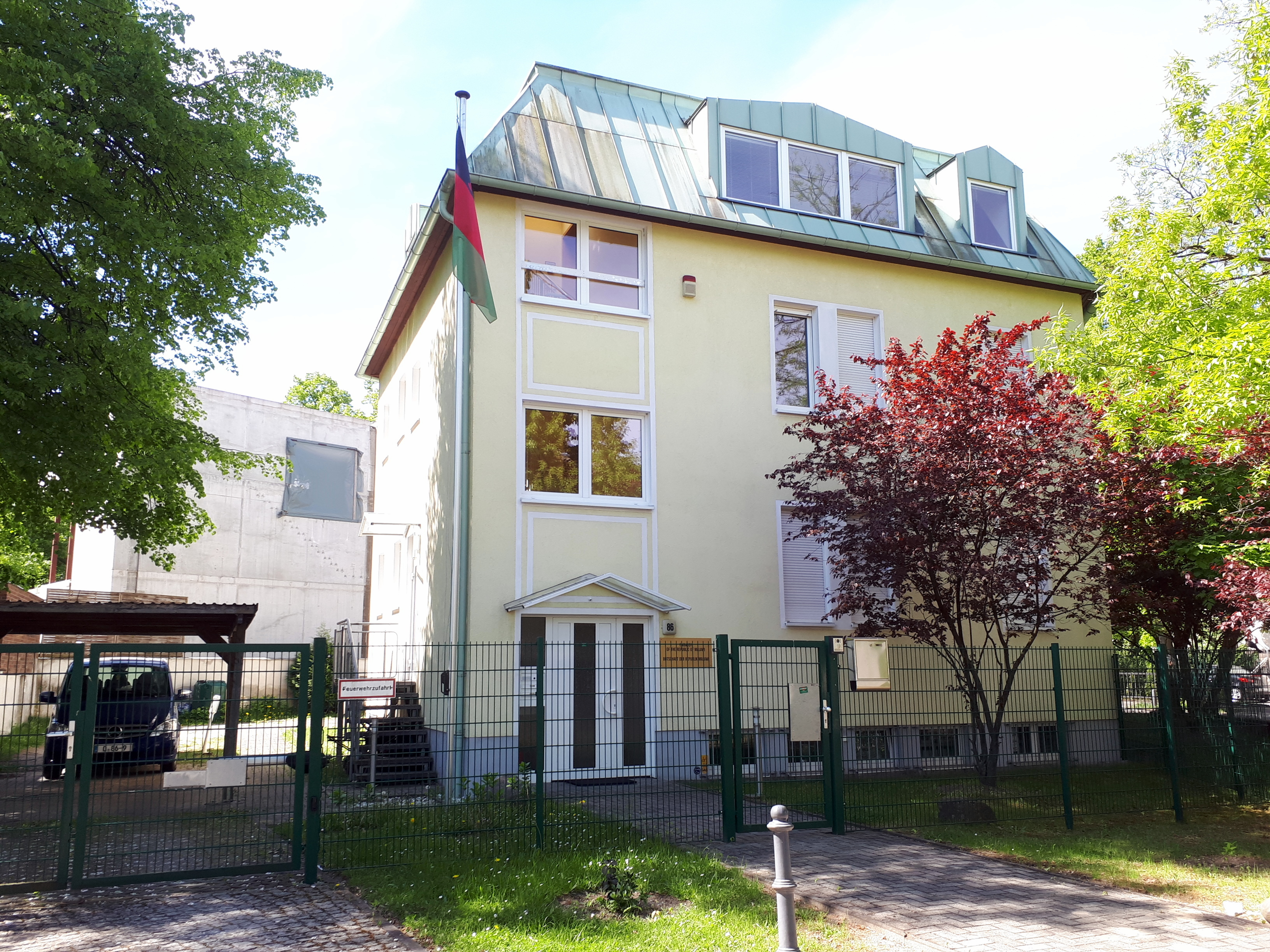
Embassy in Berlin

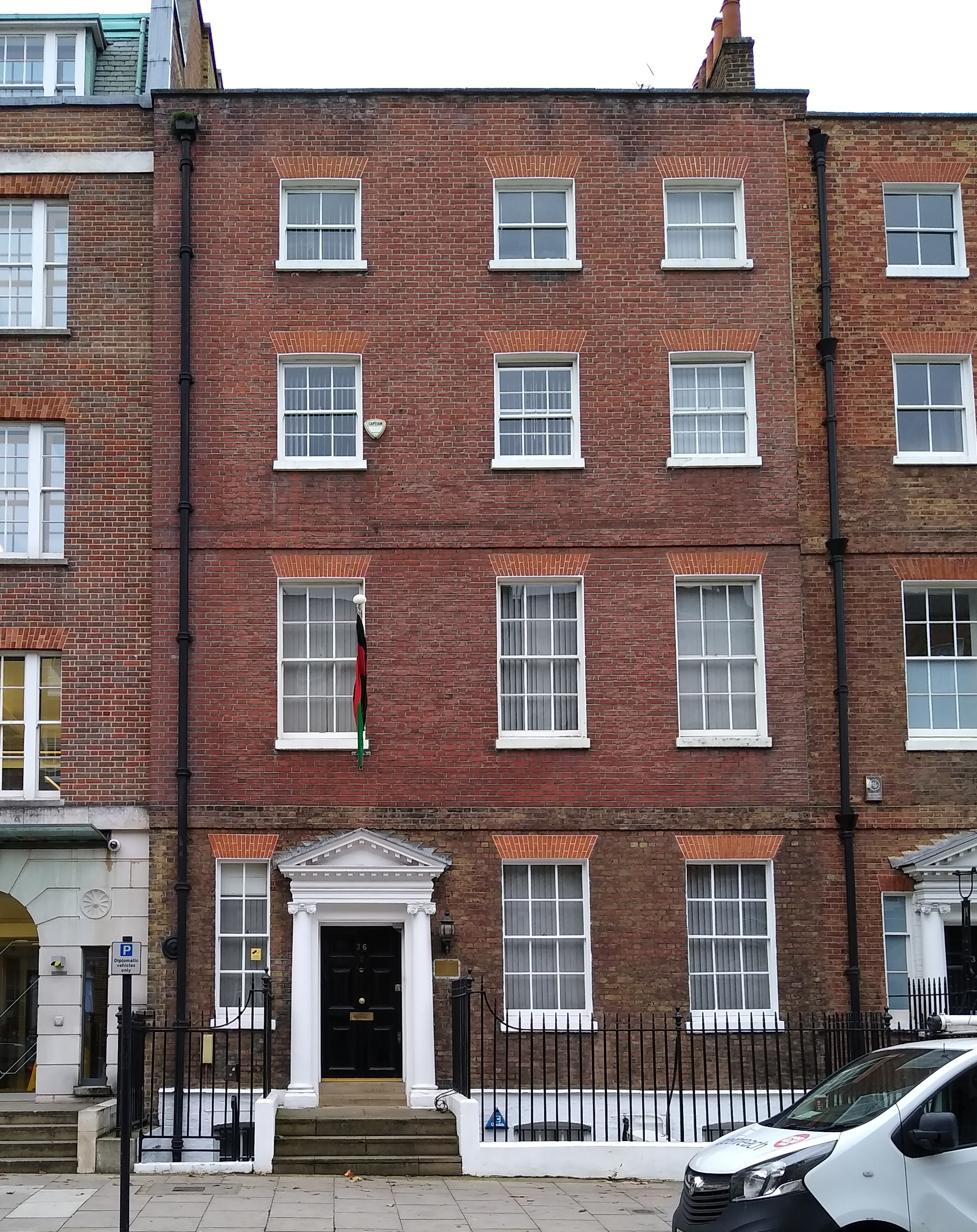
High Commission in London

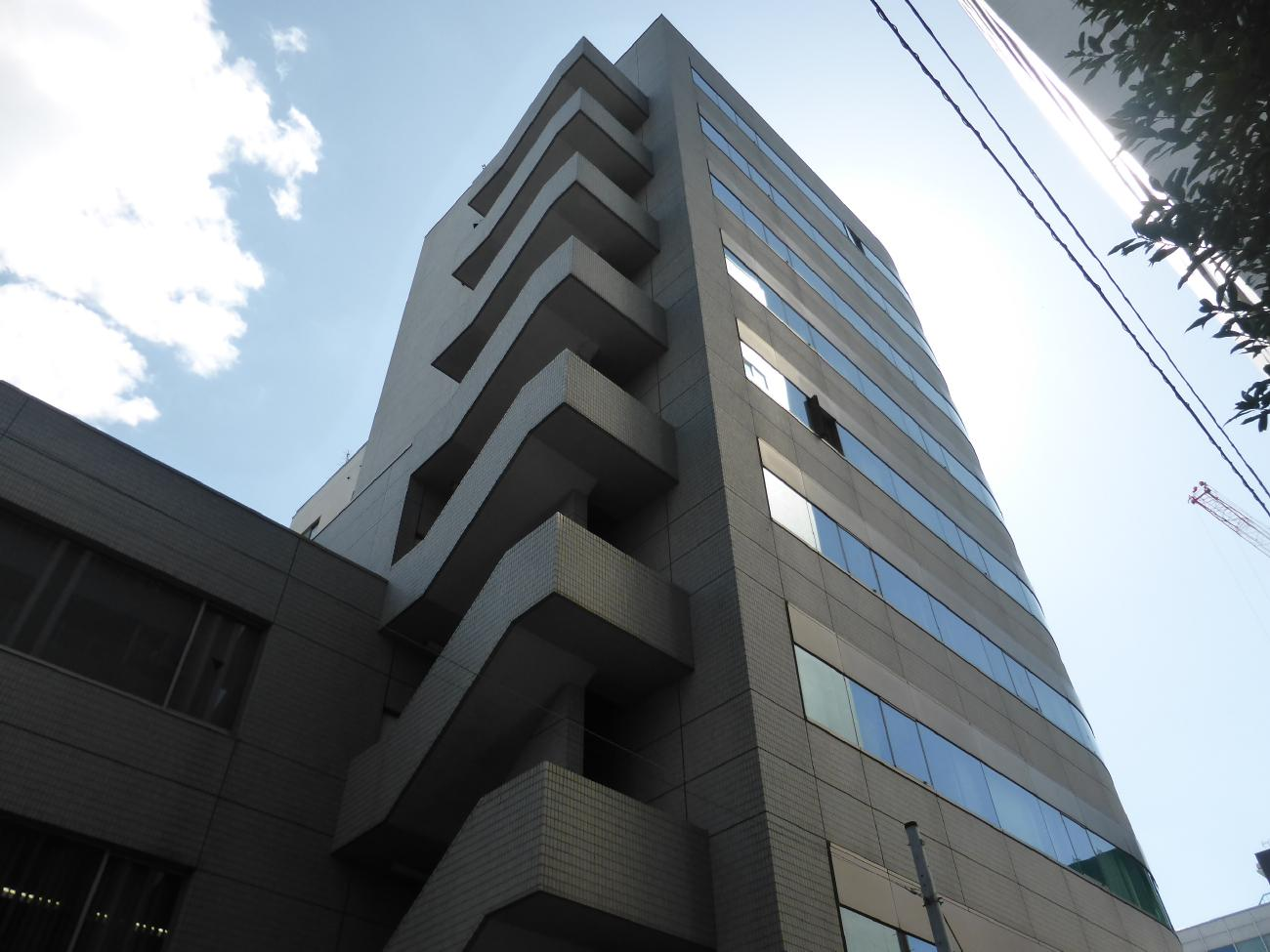
Building hosting the Embassy in Tokyo

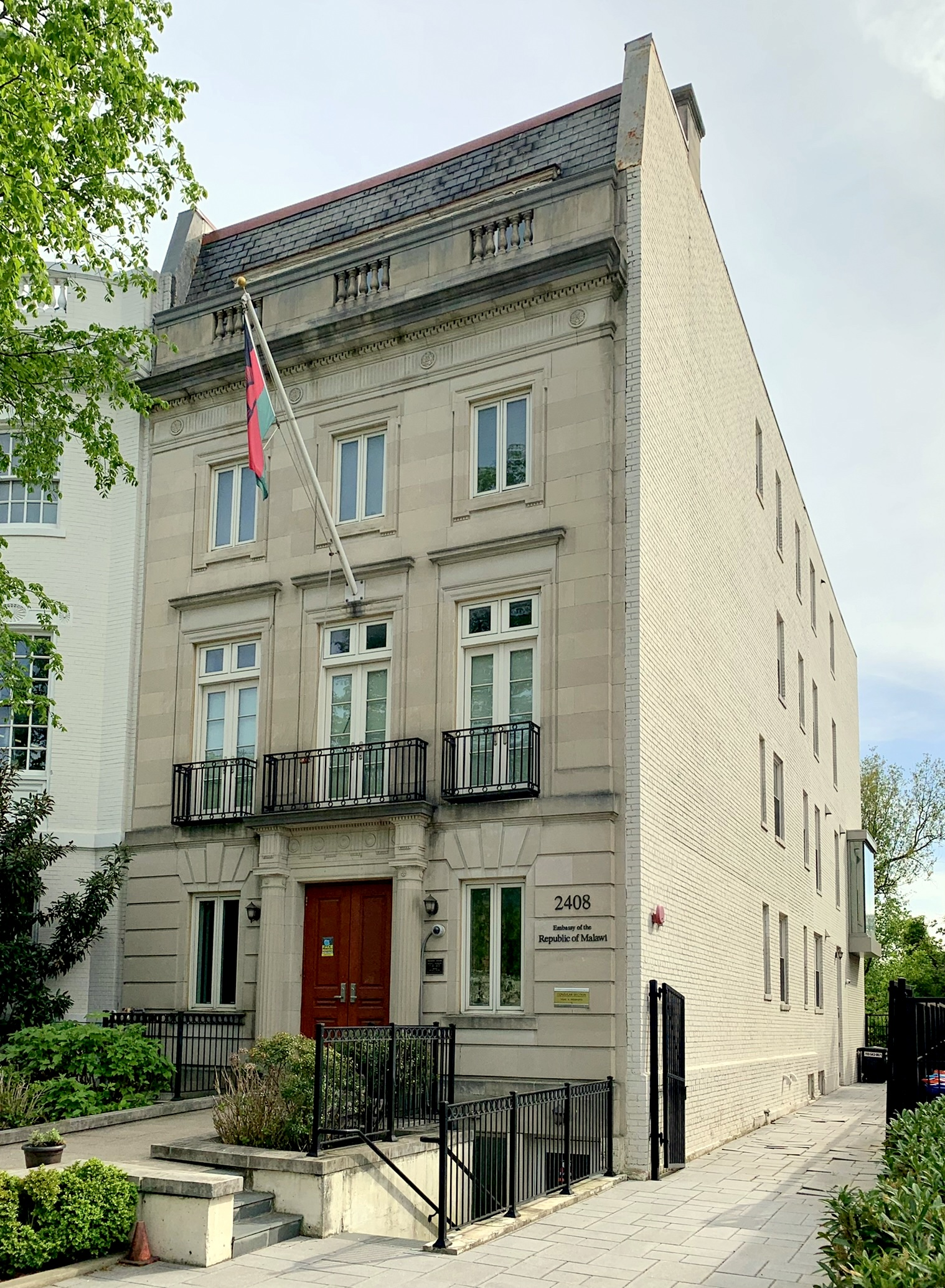
Embassy in Washington, D.C.

== Closed missions ==
=== Africa ===
Host country	Host city	Mission	Year closed	Ref.
Libya	Tripoli	Embassy	2004	

=== Americas ===
Host country	Host city	Mission	Year closed	Ref.
Canada	Ottawa	High Commission	2005	

=== Asia ===
Host country	Host city	Mission	Year closed	Ref.
Republic of China (Taiwan)	Taipei	Embassy	2008	

== See also ==
- Foreign relations of Malawi
- List of diplomatic missions in Malawi
- Visa policy of Malawi
