= Kenya–Malawi relations =

- Kenya: Malawi

Kenya–Malawi relations are bilateral relations between Kenya and Malawi.

== History ==
Malawi and Kenya have had diplomatic relations since 1964.

President Mwai Kibaki of Kenya visited Malawi in 2013. He held talks with President Joyce Banda. They both agreed to deepen trade and diplomatic ties. They also agreed to promote peace and security in Africa.

== Development cooperation ==
In 1999, an agreement on Economic and technical cooperation came into force. The agreement also established a Joint Commission between both countries which still operates.

Both countries later established a Joint Permanent Commission of Cooperation in 2002.

During the Malawi floods in 2015, Kenya gave KES. 91 million (US$1 million) to Malawi.

== Economic relations ==
Trade has been increasing ever since the inception of COMESA which both countries are part of.

Kenya's main exports to Malawi include: edible oils, margarines, detergents, baking powder, kitchen and table wares, spices, blankets, beauty products, toiletries, irrigation pumps, tyres, and textiles and crafts.

Malawi's main exports to Kenya include: maize seed, electrical conductors, tobacco, and precious stones.

A notable number of Kenyan firms operate in Malawi in the transport, manufacturing, farming, hospitality, food processing, and information technology sectors.

=== Transportation ===
Kenya Airways runs regular flights to Malawi. Under the Fifth Freedom Kenya Airways has to have a commercial agreement with Air Malawi to operate the Lilongwe-Lusaka route for flights to neighboring countries.

== Diplomatic missions ==
Malawi reopened its High Commission in Nairobi in 2013. The mission was closed in 2005. Kenya is still working on reopening its High Commission in Malawi. Kenya's High Commission in Zambia is currently accredited to Malawi.

== See also ==
- Foreign relations of Kenya
- Foreign relations of Malawi
