= Kwataine =

Kwataine is a traditional authority under the paramount chief, Inkosi Yamakosi Gomani in Ntcheu District, Malawi. This traditional authority area consists of an estimated 500,000 people, largely of Ngoni origin.

== Chief Kwataine Masina ==
Chief Mac Julio Kwataine Masina is a former English and history teacher who is the Chief of Kwataine, Ntcheu, Ntcheu District in the Central Region. He is well known for initiating safe motherhood activities in his area in 1996. Chief Kwataine was elevated from Traditional Authority (TA) to Senior Traditional Authority by President Joyce Banda in 2012 due to his work on incorporating Ngoni tradition with maternal health in the Kwataine area. The Chief became the Chairperson of the Presidential initiative on Maternal and Safe motherhood since April 2012. He has since been raising awareness and mobilizing communities for safe motherhood. He trained over 1,000 traditional leaders on HIV/AIDS and safe motherhood. He was a part of the 'saving mothers panel' at the fourth annual Women in the World Summit (2013) in New York. There were 52 maternal deaths between 2000 and 2005 prior to the initiative, but over the past three years no woman in the 89 villages under Chief Kwataine's authority has died during childbirth. He has also he managed to mobilise Kwataine residents to donate money to construct their own basic emergency obstetric services clinic.
