= Gomani V =

- Inkosi ya Makhosi

Paramount chief of the Maseko Ngoni
- Reign: 5 August 2012 - present
- Regent: Rosemary Malinki, 2009–2012
- Born: Mswati Willard Kanjedza Gomani; 1995 (age 30–31)
- Spouse: Risharadza Khanyisa-Mathebula (m. 2019)
- House: Gomani (Maseko Ngoni royal family)
- Father: Gomani IV

Gomani V (born Mswati Willard Kanjedza Gomani, 1995) is the Inkosi ya Makhosi (paramount chief) of the Maseko Ngoni of Malawi, whose traditional headquarters are at Lizulu in Ntcheu District. He was named heir after his father, Inkosi ya Makhosi Gomani IV, died in 2009 and was installed in August 2012. His reign has included a 2015 dispute within the Gomani royal family, the revival of the annual Umhlangano cultural festival, and a public campaign against child marriage.

== Early life and accession ==
Mswati Willard Kanjedza Gomani was born in 1995, the first child of Alex Kanjadza Willard Gomani, who later reigned as Gomani IV. Gomani IV died on 19 September 2009 and Mswati, then aged 13, was declared crown prince. His aunt, Rosemary Malinki, acted as Inkosi ya Makhosi during the regency. He was installed as Gomani V on 5 August 2012, at a ceremony attended by President Joyce Banda. At the time he was a secondary school student at Kamuzu Academy.

== Succession dispute ==
In September 2015, a meeting of about 24 members of the Gomani royal family in Ntcheu resolved to remove Gomani V, stating that he and Malinki had been despising other members of the family. At the meeting, Senior Prince Titus Phillip Gomani (son of Gomani II) named Dingiswayo Samson Gomani as caretaker paramount chief. The group said it had been sidelined by the chief and those close to him, and accused him of dividing the clan. In response, Gomani V said that his coronation oath bound him until death and that he would continue in office. Advisors to the chief, led by Inkosi Njolomole, said that a Ngoni chief is known at birth and cannot be dismissed by family members. Another advisor, lawyer Chikumbutso Mkwamba, said that under the Chiefs Act only the President can remove a chief after following due process. A royal family spokesperson, Henry Hastings Gomani, called the removal unprocedural and denied the claim that Gomani V had become arrogant.

In mid-October 2015, the Minister of Local Government and Rural Development, Kondwani Nankhumwa, called a meeting of representatives of the seven branches of the Gomani royal family, attended by both factions. After the meeting he announced a three-member committee of chiefs (Paramount Chief Chikulamayembe, Senior Chief Mpherembe and Chief Ngabu) to reconcile the family, and said that both sides had agreed on the need to restore the dignity of the chieftaincy.

In November 2015 Gomani V applied to the High Court asking it to stop Titus Phillip Gomani from installing Dingiswayo Gomani as paramount or caretaker. And to stop both men from declaring that Gomani V was no longer paramount chief or presenting themselves as heads of the royal family. In a separate dispute, Titus Phillip Gomani, obtained a High Court injunction against Gomani V, Malinki and the Ntcheu District Commissioner to stop that year's Umhlangano, saying he had been sidelined from organising the festival since 2013; the order was eventually lifted on the day of the event.

== Cultural leadership ==
According to the Maseko Ngoni Heritage Trust, Gomani V revived the Umhlangano cultural festival in 2013 as an annual gathering of the whole kingdom, held at Nkolimbo Village in Ntcheu District. He cancelled the 2024 festival and declared three months of mourning after the deaths of Vice President Saulos Chilima, who was one of his impi (advisors), and the musician Lucius Banda. President Lazarus Chakwera spoke at the 2025 festival, where Gomani V said that culture gives people their identity. The 2026 festival ran for six days with delegates from Mozambique, Zambia, South Africa, Eswatini and Lesotho; Gomani V said it should respond to problems including early marriage, teen pregnancy, school dropout and mental health. A 2016 Nation feature credited his efforts with starting isi-Ngoni language classes in Lilongwe.

At an iMbizo gathering in January 2026, Gomani V said that his reign would not tolerate indiscipline by traditional leaders or their subjects carried out in the name of culture, and decreed that men should include dowry in their marriages.

== Child marriage advocacy ==
In 2018, World Vision Malawi named Gomani V one of eight ambassadors for its "It Takes Malawi to End Child Marriage" campaign, alongside figures including Senior Chief Theresa Kachindamoto of Dedza. In August 2019, Gomani V called upon traditional leaders to support girls' education and act against child marriage in their areas. Gomani V has said that he would remove chiefs under his authority who condone child marriage. In September 2020, at a chief's council at Ntonda Primary School in Traditional Authority Phambala, he told traditional leaders in Ntcheu to end existing child marriages and return the children to school.

== Reform of initiation rites ==
World Vision Malawi partnered with Gomani V in 2023 to review Maseko Ngoni initiation practices and set a common standard for them. According to World Vision, the review consulted traditional leaders, community members, Ntcheu District Council, district education, health, social welfare and gender offices, the judiciary, the police amd the NGO Youth Net and Counsellin. The resulting guidebook, The New Chinamwali Curriculum Initiation Rites of the Ngoni People, was launched during the 2025 Umhlangano festival in the presence of President Chakwera and First Lady Monica Chakwera. At the launch, Gomani V said that many girls and boys leave school to marry and that the initiation stage needed review and a standard syllabus. The Times reported that the handbook limits ceremonies to ten days, schedules them during school holidays, covers menstrual hygiene, health and children's rights, and prohibits practices including beatings, public nudity and obscene songs.

== Personal life ==
On 2 November 2019 Gomani V married Rishaladza Khanyisa Mathebula, from Giyani in South Africa, at Ntcheu CCAP Church, with celebrations combined with that years' Umhlangano.

== See also ==
- Ngoni people
- Gomani II
- List of rulers of the Ngoni Dynasty of Maseko (Gomani)
- Women in Malawi
