= Malawian diaspora =

People from Malawi who reside outside of Malawi

Malawian diaspora refers to Malawian citizens and foreign nationals of Malawian descent who relocate—temporarily or permanently—to foreign countries. There are no reliable figures on how many Malawians live abroad. Populations of Malawians can be found in the Americas, Europe, Africa and Asia. Malawians have historically been an important supply of both skilled and unskilled labor to other countries. Malawians were a source of labor to the diamond and gold mines in Southern Africa, particularly South Africa. Many Malawian health professionals have migrated to the Global North (developed nations) in search of employment. The migration of skilled labor has contributed to the brain drain that is affecting many African nations.

== Malawians in Africa ==
Malawians are the most dispersed group in Southern Africa. Large population of Malawians live in southern African countries, such as Namibia, Mozambique, South Africa, Tanzania, Zambia, and Zimbabwe. Malawians were a source of labor to South Africa, and this supply of labor played a crucial role in Malawi-South Africa relations. This resulted in power and clout over southern African foreign affairs and diplomacy.

In Zambia, Presidents Kenneth Kaunda and Rupiah Banda were both thought to be of Malawian descent, and that this may have influenced their leadership.

== Malawians in the Americas ==
There are Malawians living in the North America, Central America and Latin America. In the United States there is a significant number of Malawians, and various cultural organizations and start-up stores have opened in the U.S. that cater to Malawians living there, and promote Malawian culture. The oldest of these being the Malawi Washington Association. African immigrants in the United States are part of the most educated group in the United States. Out of this group, Malawians rank amongst the top five countries from Africa reporting a high school diploma or more.

== Malawians in Europe ==
Malawians in Europe largely reside in the United Kingdom since Malawi was a former British colony. Many Malawians living in the UK are work in the healthcare sector. There are currently more than 250 Malawian doctors in Manchester. Malawians in the UK have managed to take interest in the politics and policies of Malawi and exert their influence in their host country. As an example, they successfully campaigned against the US-based Hunger Project's awarding of a Food Prize to President Bingu wa Mutharika. Their involvement has led to reaction from Mutharika, who accused the diaspora at large of tarnishing the image of his government and the country to multinational organisations.

Malawians in Scotland have been finding methods to help promote development in their home country by forming an organisation to create a skills exchange in Malawi called MIND.

There is also a small community of Malawian-born people residing in Portugal as of 2020 according to IOM estimates. There are around 521 people born in Malawi living in Portugal.

== Notable Malawians in the Diaspora ==
- Daliso Chaponda – UK based comedian
- Masauko Chipembere Jr – U.S.-based singer
- John Lwanda – Scotland-based scholar, medical physician, producer, and writer
- Ray Phiri – South African-based jazz musician
- James Thindwa – U.S.-based labour activist
- Gemini Major – South African based producer and hip-hop artist
