= Malawi–Mozambique relations =

- Malawi: Mozambique

Malawi–Mozambique relations refers to the current and historical relationship between the countries of Malawi and Mozambique. As Malawi shares a large border with Mozambique, much of the substance of their foreign relations pertain to the border separating the two nations. Both of the sovereign states have amicably agreed that lacustrine borders on Lake Malawi remain the largest priority between the two countries, as the exploitation of natural resources within the waters of Lake Malawi remain an issue the two countries continue to resolve. The moment considered an act of generosity and sympathy within the two countries relations is when, during the Mozambique Civil War, Malawi housed over one million Mozambican refugees between 1985 and 1995. After this gesture, Malawian relations with Mozambique crumbled under the tenure of Bingu wa Mutharika, notoriously reaching a nadir when Malawian police launched a raid into Mozambique's territory. Both countries are members of the African Union, Commonwealth of Nations and Non-Aligned Movement.

== Lake Malawi border ==
In 1954, an agreement was signed between the British and the Portuguese colonial powers making the middle of Lake Nyasa their boundary with the exception of Chizumulu Island and Likoma Island, which were kept by the British and are now part of Malawi. These islands lie just a few kilometres from Mozambique and are surrounded by Mozambican territorial waters, but remain exclaves of Malawi. This came about because the islands were colonised by Anglican missionaries spreading east from Nyasaland, rather than by the Portuguese who colonised Mozambique.

The lacustrine border between Malawi and Mozambique on Lake Nyasa has been the subject of tension between the nations, since the age of resource exploitation on the lake. The discovery of oil and subsequent drilling provided an impetus for diplomatic rows, but the two nations have worked hard to prevent this from occurring. A recent JPCC (Joint Permanent Commission of Cooperation) meeting in Lilongwe attended by both countries' respective foreign minister galvanized the desire for affirmation of the countries' borders, even before any petroleum drilling begins. Said Malawi's foreign minister Ephraim Chiume: "Border re-affirmation exercise is progressing well but I urge those doing it to speed up the process so that we can commence mineral resources exploration in a harmonious way." The Mozambican foreign minister, Oldemiro Baloi, also set forth the same position, stating: "Mozambique is very much interested in moving towards the establishment of legal mechanism to improve the cooperation in the field of shared resources and with regard to mineral exploration, we are waiting for the affirmation of the boundaries between our two countries."

== Shire and Zambezi rivers ==
The Shire River, tributary of the Zambezi River, meanders through both Malawi and Mozambique. The two countries' presidents recently signed an agreement regarding the Shire-Zambezi waterway, a path for exports and imports to travel to/from Malawi, as opposed to the alternative road transport. The waterway connects the Malawian port of Nsanje with the Mozambican port of Beira and is traveled extensively by watercraft. Recently, the waterway has caused difficulty for the country, but the misunderstandings have been put aside, and the waterway is jointly administered by Malawi and Mozambique. Mozambican newspaper Notícias reported that this agreement was signed in May 2012 by Mozambican President Armando Guebuza and his Malawian counterpart, Joyce Banda. Earlier, when the port was inaugurated, Mozambique confiscated trial barges that were sent down the Zambezi.

== Mozambican refugee situation ==
During and in the aftermath of the Mozambique Civil War, Malawi housed more than one million Mozambican refugees. The refugee crisis placed a substantial strain on Malawi's economy but also drew significant inflows of international assistance. In the Nsanje district alone, more than 220,000 refugees made the area their abode, outnumbering the local population and often suffering from ailments and maladies such as malaria, bilharzia, diarrhea, severe malnutrition and leprosy. In a July 1998 New York Times piece, the newspaper stated that "hundreds more come across the border each day, with no end in sight." However, the Malawian government was sympathetic to these victims of war, and provided them with rudimentary needs such as medical attention, shelter, food, water, and clothes. Despite the innumerable odds against success, the Malawian government was mostly successful in the repatriation efforts towards the Mozambican refugees, with the process being lauded as a great success by many international observers.

== International transport ==
In addition to the earlier mentioned Shire-Zambezi Waterway, Malawi and Mozambique share many cooperatively congruous highways and roads, along with routes on the Central East African Railway, including the centerpiece line running between the railways dual operational headquarters of Limbe and Nacala.

== Energy ==
Malawi is known throughout the world for its dearth of energy, sustainable or non-sustainable. In order to combat this, Malawi recently signed an agreement with Mozambique that allows cooperative employment (usage) of the Cahora Bassa hydroelectric dam. The deal was earlier proposed in 2008, but stalled due to cost concerns.

== Resident diplomatic missions ==
- Malawi has a high commission in Maputo.
- Mozambique has a high commission in Lilongwe and a consulate-general in Blantyre.
