= Malawian nationality law =

Malawian Citizenship Act

National Assembly of Malawi
- Long title: Malawi Citizenship Act, No.28 of 1966, as amended
- Enacted by: Government of Malawi
- Status: Current legislation

Malawian nationality law is regulated by the Constitution of Malawi, as amended; the Malawian Citizenship Act, and its revisions; and various international agreements to which the country is a signatory. These laws determine who is, or is eligible to be, a national of Malawi. The legal means to acquire nationality, formal legal membership in a nation, differ from the domestic relationship of rights and obligations between a national and the nation, known as citizenship. Nationality describes the relationship of an individual to the state under international law, whereas citizenship is the domestic relationship of an individual and the nation. Malawian nationality is typically obtained under the principle of jus soli, i.e. by birth in Malawi, or jus sanguinis, born to a father with Malawian nationality. It can be granted to persons with an affiliation to the country, or to a permanent resident who has lived in the country for a given period of time through naturalisation.

== Acquisition of nationality ==
Nationality can be acquired in Malawi at birth or later in life through naturalisation or registration.

=== By birth ===
Those who acquire nationality at birth include, children born anywhere to a parent with Malawian nationality, unless the father is a national of a country with which Malawi is at war or the child is born during an enemy military occupation. Children born abroad to a parent who was born in Malawi are considered to have Malawian nationality, but they cannot pass that nationality to their children who are born abroad.

=== By naturalisation ===
Naturalisation can be granted to foreign persons who have resided in the territory for a sufficient period of time to confirm they understand English or one of the languages currently spoken in the country and the customs and traditions of the society. General provisions are that applicants have good character and conduct, are able to support themselves, and can demonstrate that they will be suitable citizens. Applicants must have resided in the country for seven years. There are no provisions in the nationality laws for adoptees to gain Malawian nationality, nor are children or wives of applicants seeking naturalisation granted automatic status based upon the approval of an application of their father or spouse. Decisions of the Minister responsible for nationality may not be challenged in court.

=== Registration ===
Persons who have a close connection, meaning that they were born in the country, have parents who were born in the country, or have a 20-year or more residency in the territory, are eligible for registration. Registration is not automatic, but at the discretion of authorities. Persons who can register as nationals include:

- Persons who are stateless who were born in Malawi, after a three-year residency;
- Persons who were born in Malawi or Mozambique for whom both parents were also born in either Malawi or Mozambique;
- The wife of a Malawian husband after a five-year residency provided she meets the requirements for naturalisation and agrees to take an oath of allegiance and declare her intent to reside in Malawi; or
- Commonwealth citizens who ordinarily reside in Malawi can register after five years of residency.

== Loss of nationality ==
Malawian nationals of origin can renounce their nationality if approved to do so by the state to ensure that such renunciation is not done during war or would leave the person stateless. Nationals of Malawi may be denaturalised for performing actions against state interests; committing serious crimes, disloyal acts, or crimes against the state or state security; for consorting with an enemy during war; for residing abroad for a continuous period exceeding seven years unless in the service of the government or an international entity registered with the consulate; or for fraud, misrepresentation, or concealment in a naturalisation petition.

== Dual nationality ==
Dual nationality has been allowed in Malawi since the amendment of the Citizenship Act in 2019.

== History ==
=== African kingdoms and European contact (1616–1889) ===
The Portuguese began penetrating Zambesia along the Zambezi river around 1530 for the purposes of trade. They came into conflict with Muslim traders who were participating in the commerce of cloth, gold, and ivory. Securing an agreement from the Batonga rulers, Portuguese traders paid tribute for control of the land on the southern bank of the Zambezi. They attempted to gain control of the northern bank but were defeated in 1632 by the Maravi Empire. The Maravi Empire ruled over territory which is now in eastern Zambia, northern Mozambique and southern Malawi. The Maravi Empire was dominant in the area until 1700, when it broke into various chieftainships; the largest of which was formed by the Chewa people, also known as the Nyanja people. The northern part of what would become Malawi was populated by the Tumbuka people, who resided in villages with kinship networks, but without political organisation. Society was organized at the beginning of the nineteenth century into villages composed of clan networks, which were overseen by a chieftain, who provided religious and judicial guidance in return for allegiance of his subjects. For all but the northern territories in which patrilineality prevailed, families were matrilocal and matrilineal. By controlling access to fishing sites and religious shrines, chieftains were able to extend their power and authority regionally.

Though Portugal had no sustained trading centers in the territory, they continued to engage in the commerce of cloth, ironware, ivory, and provisions until the nineteenth century. Between the 1830s and 1840s, the Yao people migrated from the Lujenda basin of northern Mozambique into the territories formerly held by the Maravi Empire and took over much of the ivory trade. Conflicts arose between the native inhabitants and the Yao in the 1840s and 1850s, as they expanded into the territory. From the 1860s, commerce shifted to the slave trade and raiding intensified throughout the region. In 1859, David Livingstone, the Scottish missionary and explorer first entered the territory. Increasingly in the 1870s and 1880s, Europeans began entering the area hoping to expand their trade interests. Around the same time, the Ngoni people began to raid the territory, pushing the Chewa and Yao people into alliances for trade with and protection of each other. By the mid-1880s, both groups began selling land rights to Europeans which acerbated historic tensions, as overlapping claims made ownership of territory cloudy. Resentment and fear of the Yao encroachment over their lands, led to an appeal by the Chewa to the British to extend their administration and protection over them.

=== British protectorate (1889–1963) ===
In 1889, Britain began negotiating with local chiefs to establish protectorates in the area around Lake Nyasa. After settling a dispute with the Portuguese, they extended their protectorate to cover all of the territory in present day Malawi on 15 May 1891, for the Nyasaland district. The protectorate was renamed as the British Central Africa Protectorate in 1893 and again as the Nyasaland Protectorate in 1907. The crown recognised from 1350 that all persons born within the territories of the British Empire were subjects. Those born outside the realm — except children of those serving in an official post abroad, children of the monarch, and children born on a British sailing vessel — were considered by common law to be foreigners. Marriage did not affect the status of a subject of the realm, except that under common law, single women, including divorcées, were not allowed to be parents thus their children could not derive nationality maternally and were stateless unless legitimated by their father. Nationality laws passed by the British Parliament were extended only to the Kingdom of Great Britain, and later the United Kingdom of Great Britain and Ireland. When British protectorates were established in 1815, there was little difference between the rights of British subjects and protected persons.

==== British-born subjects living in the Nyasaland Protectorate (1914–1963) ====
In 1911, at the Imperial Conference a decision was made to draft a common nationality code for use across the empire. The British Nationality and Status of Aliens Act 1914 allowed local jurisdictions in the self-governing Dominions to continue regulating nationality in their territories, but also established an imperial nationality scheme throughout the realm. The uniform law, which went into effect on 1 January 1915, required a married woman to derive her nationality from her spouse, meaning if he was British, she was also, and if he was foreign, so was she. It stipulated that upon loss of nationality of a husband, a wife could declare that she wished to remain British and provided that if a marriage had terminated, through death or divorce, a British-born national who had lost her status through marriage could reacquire British nationality through naturalisation without meeting a residency requirement. The statute reiterated common law provisions for natural-born persons born within the realm on or after the effective date. By using the word person, the statute nullified legitimacy requirements for jus soli nationals. For those born abroad on or after the effective date, legitimacy was still required, and could only be derived by a child from a British father (one generation), who was natural-born or naturalised. Naturalisations required five years residence or service to the crown.

Amendments to the British Nationality Act were enacted in 1918, 1922, 1933 and 1943 changing derivative nationality by descent and modifying slightly provisions for women to lose their nationality upon marriage. Because of a rise in statelessness, a woman who did not automatically acquire her husband's nationality upon marriage or upon his naturalisation in another country, did not lose their British status after 1933. The 1943 revision allowed a child born abroad at any time to be a British national by descent if the Secretary of State agreed to register the birth. Under the terms of the British Nationality Act 1948 British nationals in the Nyasaland protectorate were reclassified at that time as "Citizens of the UK and Colonies" (CUKC). The basic British nationality scheme did not change overmuch, and typically those who were previously defined as British remained the same. Changes included that wives and children no longer automatically acquired the status of the husband or father, children who acquired nationality by descent no longer were required to make a retention declaration, and registrations for children born abroad were extended.

==== Indigenous persons (British Protected Persons) in the Nyasaland Protectorate (1914–1965) ====
British protectorates, in 1914, were considered to be foreign territories lacking an internal government. When Britain extended this status over a territory, it took responsibility for both internal and external administration, including defense and foreign relations. Indigenous persons who were born in a protectorate were known as British Protected Persons (BPP) and were not entitled to be British subjects. BPPs had no right of return to the United Kingdom and were unable to exercise rights of citizenship; however, they could be issued a passport and could access diplomatic services when traveling abroad. In 1914, the Alien Restriction Act clarified that while BPPs were not nationals, neither were they aliens. When the law was amended in 1919, that provision remained the same, meaning that BPPs could not naturalise. Until 1934, when the British Protected Persons Order was drafted, the status of BPP was not statutory, but rather granted at the prerogative of the monarch. Under the 1934 Order, Belonger status with regard to protected territories was defined to mean persons born before or after the Order in a protectorate who possessed no nationality and were not a British subject, or persons born abroad to a native of a protectorate who were stateless and not British subjects. The statute extended BPP status to children and wives of BPPs, if they were stateless, and specifically provided that if a woman married someone who was a national of another nation, she lost her BPP status.

In 1943, the British Nationality Act clarified that BPPs born abroad in territories that were within the crown's dominions were British subjects by virtue of jus soli, but those born within a protectorate were not subjects. Under the terms of the British Nationality Act 1948, BPPs of the Nyasaland protectorate did not change their status. However, the Act, while retaining the provisions that BPPs were not aliens and could not naturalise, allowed BPPs to register as BPPs of a protected place or as a British subject under certain conditions. In 1949, the British Protectorates, Protected States and Protected Persons Order in Council repealed former orders about BPPs and detailed provisions for conferring protected status. It provided that protected persons were BPPs of a protectorate if they were born there; if they were born abroad to a father who was a native of a protectorate; or if at the time of their birth their father was a BPP. It also allowed women married to BPPs to register as a BPP and allowed certain nationals of foreign countries to register as BPPs.

=== Federation with Rhodesia (1953–1963) ===
In 1953, the Federation of Rhodesia and Nyasaland brought together the protectorates of Nyasaland and Northern Rhodesia, linking them with the independent crown colony of Southern Rhodesia. Each of the three territories maintained separate nationality rules until 1957, when the Citizenship of Rhodesia and Nyasaland and British Nationality Act was passed. Under its terms persons born within the territories of the federation, before and after it was created, were considered to be nationals, if they had previously been British subjects, as long as their father was not granted diplomatic immunity or was an enemy alien. Persons born outside of the federated territories were also considered nationals if their father had been born in one of the territories. Wives of those who became nationals of the federation, or would have become so except for the death of their spouse, who did not gain nationality by other provisions, were allowed to register, as long as they were not a party to a polygamous relationship. Those who were British protected persons had no change in status under the statute, which reclassified as federation nationals only those persons whose fathers were British subjects. The Federation dissolved on 1 January 1964. Those who had been nationals of the Federation were reclassified as CUKCs, unless they became on that date nationals of Southern Rhodesia. Nyasaland returned to the status of a protectorate and BPPs therein retained their status as protected persons.

=== Post-independence (1964–present) ===
On 6 July 1964, Nyasaland gained independence and renamed the territory Malawi. At independence, those who became Malawian automatically were those who had been born in the territory to a parent who was also born there, or born abroad to a father who was born in the former territory of the Nyasaland Protectorate. Persons who were habitually residing in Nyasaland were allowed to register as nationals, as were persons who had strong connections to the country and had formerly been citizens of one of the countries of the Federation of Rhodesia and Nyasaland. In general, those who had previously been CUKCs or BPPs in the former Nyasaland Protectorate ceased to be British at independence and gained Malawian nationality. Those who were ineligible for Malawian nationality retained their British status. A wife of a Malawian followed the status of her husband, thus, if he remained a BPP, she remained a BPP or if he became Malawian she became Malawian. After independence, nationality was transmitted to those born within Malawi to parents who were Malawian or abroad if the father was a national of Malawi.

In 1966, a new constitution was drafted, as well as a new Citizenship Act, which allowed any child born in Malawian territory to one parent who was Malawian and racially African to acquire nationality at birth. It also allowed children born abroad to acquire nationality on the same grounds, equalising the provisions to acquire nationality maternally. Procedures were outlined for Commonwealth citizens to obtain nationality through registration. By requiring that nationality was based on being of the African race, many descendants of Indian workers who had been recruited to work in Nyasaland between 1910 and 1945, were unable to acquire nationality in Malawi. Malawian women who acquired other nationality through marriage to a foreigner were denaturalised unless they renounced the foreign nationality. Amendments enacted in 1967 and 1971 allowed persons who were born in Malawi, but not racially African to naturalise. The 1971 amendment also eliminated the ability of persons without a close connection to Malawi to obtain nationality through registration. The racial qualification for nationality was removed when the act was amended in 1992. Under the Constitution of 1994, women and children were given the right to acquire nationality and Section 24 specifically provided that neither marital status nor gender were grounds for discrimination against women. The Citizenship Act was amended in 2019, removing the criteria for a woman to renounce other citizenship to retain Malawian nationality and provide for dual nationality to all Malawians, as long as the authorities are notified. Despite these changes, Malawian women are unable to assist their foreign spouse to attain nationality on the same basis as is afforded to Malawian men and their wives.
