= List of rulers of the Ngoni Dynasty of Maseko (Gomani) =

List of Rulers of the Ngoni Dynasty of Maseko (Gomani) (Malawi):

Term	Incumbent	Notes
Maseko Dynasty (Gomani Dynasty)
Inkosi ya makosi (Paramount chief)
? to 1832	Ngwana, Inkosi ya makosi
1832 to 1835	Magadlela, Co-Regent
1832 to 1835	Mgoola, Co-Regent
1835 to 1860	Maseko Mputa, Inkosi ya makosi
1860 to 1878	Cidiaonga, Regent
1878 to 18xx	Cikusi, Inkosi ya makosi
18xx to 1896	Gomani I, Inkosi ya makosi
1896 to 1954	Philip Gomani II, Inkosi ya makosi
1954 to 2008	Willard Gomani III, Inkosi ya makosi
2008 to 2009	Gomani IV, Inkosi ya makosi
2009 to	Willard Gomani V, Inkosi ya makosi
