= List of diplomatic missions in Malawi =

This is a list of diplomatic missions in Malawi. Lilongwe hosts 17 embassies/high commissions.

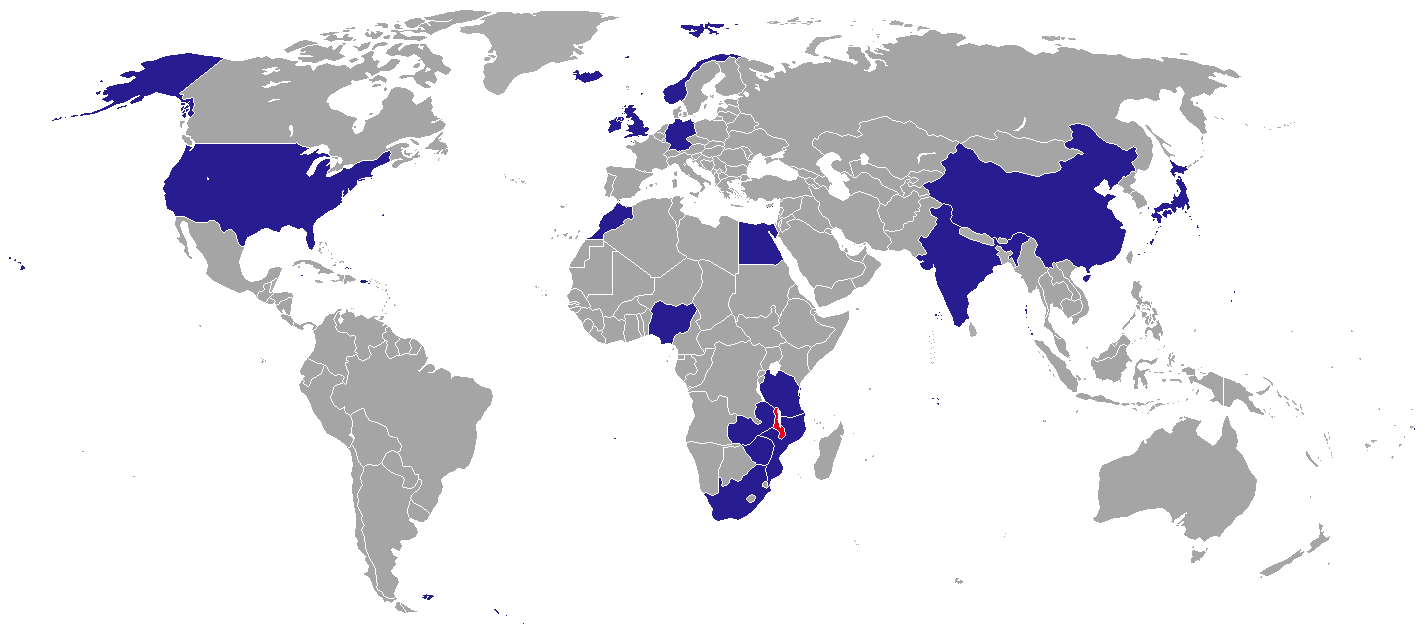
Map of diplomatic missions in Malawi

== Diplomatic missions in Lilongwe ==
=== Embassies/High Commissions ===
1. China
2. Egypt
3. Germany
4. Iceland
5. India
6. Ireland
7. Japan
8. Morocco
9. Mozambique
10. Nigeria
11. Norway
12. South Africa
13. Tanzania
14. United Kingdom
15. United States
16. Zambia
17. Zimbabwe

=== Other delegations or missions ===
1. African Union (Regional Delegation)
2. European Union (Delegation)
3. Flanders (General Representation)
4. United Nations (Resident Coordinator's Office)

== Consular missions ==
=== Blantyre ===
- Mozambique (Consulate-General)

== Embassies to open ==
- France
- Turkey
- United Arab Emirates

== Non-resident embassies and high commissions ==
Resident in Dar es Salaam, Tanzania:

- Belgium
- Slovakia
- Somalia
- Uganda
- United Arab Emirates

Resident in Harare, Zimbabwe:

- Australia
- Botswana
- Greece
- Malaysia
- Portugal
- Pakistan
- Nicaragua
- Romania
- Russia
- Sahrawi Republic
- South Korea
- Spain
- Sweden
- Switzerland

Resident in Lusaka, Zambia:

- Angola
- Brazil
- Congo-Kinshasa
- Cuba
- Czechia
- Finland
- France
- Italy
- Kenya
- Rwanda

Resident in Maputo, Mozambique:

- Algeria
- Canada
- Equatorial Guinea
- Eswatini
- Indonesia
- Libya
- Saudi Arabia
- Thailand
- Venezuela
- Vietnam

Resident in Nairobi, Kenya:

- Austria
- Israel
- Philippines
- Sierra Leone
- Tunisia

Resident in Pretoria, South Africa:

- Argentina
- Colombia
- Croatia
- Burkina Faso
- Cameroon
- Cyprus
- Eritrea
- Lesotho
- Liberia
- Mali
- Mexico
- New Zealand
- Poland
- Serbia
- Seychelles
- Trinidad and Tobago

Resident elsewhere:

- Laos (New Delhi)
- Malta (Valletta)

== Former diplomatic post ==
- Denmark (Embassy)
- France (Embassy office; to be reopened) (Note: Resident in Lusaka, Zambia)
- Libya (Embassy)
- South Korea (Embassy; Closed in 1992)

== See also ==
- Foreign relations of Malawi
