= Visa policy of Malawi =

Policy on permits required to enter Malawi

Visitors to Malawi must obtain an e-Visa unless they are citizens from one of the visa-exempt countries or citizens who may obtain a visa on arrival.

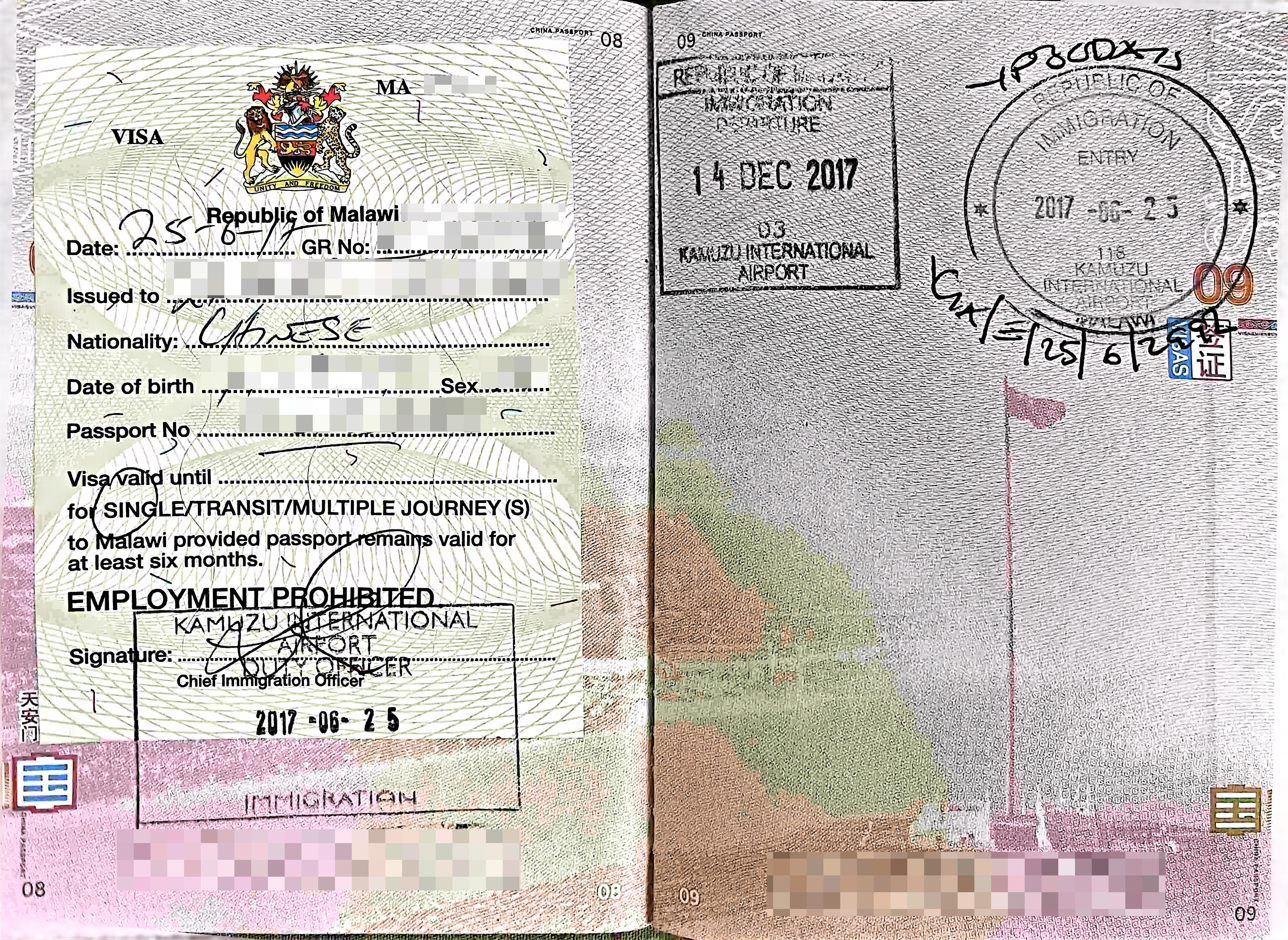
A Malawi single-entry visa issued to a Chinese citizen in 2017 at Kamuzu International Airport

== Visa policy map ==
Visa policy of Malawi Malawi Visa not required (30 days) Visa on arrival / eVisa eVisa

== Visa exemption ==
=== Ordinary passports ===
Citizens of the following countries and territories may enter Malawi without a visa for up to 30 days, which may be extended for a further 60 days upon application and payment of appropriate fees. The maximum period of stay is 90 days.

- Angola
- Antigua and Barbuda
- Bahamas
- Barbados
- Belize
- Benin
- Botswana
- Dominica
- Dominican Republic
- Ecuador
- Eswatini
- Fiji
- Gambia
- Ghana
- Grenada
- Haiti
- Hong Kong
- Israel
- Jamaica
- Kenya
- Kiribati
- Lesotho
- Malaysia
- Mauritius
- Mozambique
- Namibia
- Nauru
- Philippines
- Rwanda
- Saint Kitts and Nevis
- Saint Lucia
- Saint Vincent and the Grenadines
- Seychelles
- Singapore
- South Africa
- Tanzania
- Trinidad and Tobago
- Tuvalu
- Uganda
- Vanuatu
- Zambia
- Zimbabwe

Date of visa changes

Visa exemption

- 7 February 2024: Australia, Belgium, Brunei, Canada, China Cyprus, Finland, France, Germany, Ghana, Guyana, Ireland, Italy, Maldives, Malta, Netherlands, New Zealand, Norway, Papua New Guinea, Poland, Portugal, Russia, Sierra Leone, Singapore, Solomon, Islands, Sri Lanka, Sweden, United Kingdom, United States

Cancelled:

- 1 October 2015: Australia, Bangladesh, Belgium, Brunei, Canada, Cyprus, Denmark, Finland, France, Germany, Ghana, Guyana, Iceland, Italy, Japan, Luxembourg, Madagascar, Maldives, Malta, Nepal, Netherlands, New Zealand, Norway, Papua New Guinea, Portugal, San Marino, Sierra Leone, Singapore, Solomon Islands, South Korea, Spain, Sri Lanka, Sweden, Taiwan, Tonga, United Kingdom, United States, Vanuatu.
- 9 September 2016: Ireland
- 3 January 2026: Australia, Bangladesh, Belgium, Brunei, Canada, Cyprus, Denmark, Finland, France, Germany, Guyana, Iceland, Italy, Japan, Luxembourg, Madagascar, Maldives, Malta, Nepal, Netherlands, New Zealand, Norway, Papua New Guinea, Portugal, San Marino, Sierra Leone, Solomon Islands, South Korea, Spain, Sri Lanka, Sweden, Taiwan, Tonga, United Kingdom, United States.

Visa on arrival

- 1 October 2015: Albania, Andorra, Argentina, Armenia, Australia, Austria, Azerbaijan, Bahrain, Belarus, Belgium, Benin, Bhutan, Bolivia, Bosnia and Herzegovina, Brazil, Brunei, Bulgaria, Cambodia, Canada, Cape Verde, Chile, China,^{*} Colombia,^{*} Comoros, Congo, Costa Rica, Côte d'Ivoire, Croatia, Cyprus, Czech Republic, Democratic Republic of Congo, Denmark, Dominican Republic, Ecuador, El Salvador, Equatorial Guinea, Estonia, Finland, France, Gabon, Georgia, Germany, Greece, Guyana, Guatemala, Guinea, Guinea-Bissau, Haiti, Honduras, Hungary, Iceland, Indonesia, Ireland (Rep.), Italy, Japan, Jordan, North Korea, South Korea, Kuwait, Kyrgyzstan, Laos., Latvia, Liechtenstein, Lithuania, Luxembourg, Macedonia, Madagascar, Maldives, Malta, Marshall Islands, Mexico, Micronesia, Moldova, Monaco, Mongolia, Montenegro, Myanmar, Netherlands, New Zealand, Nicaragua, Norway, Palau, Panama, Papua New Guinea, Paraguay, Peru, Philippines, Poland, Portugal, Qatar,^{*} Romania, São Tomé and Príncipe, Saudi Arabia, San Marino, Serbia,^{*} Sierra Leone, Singapore, Slovakia, Slovenia, Solomon Islands, Spain, Suriname, Sweden, Switzerland, Thailand, Timor-Leste, Tonga, United Arab Emirates,^{*} United Kingdom, United States, Uruguay, Vanuatu, Venezuela, Vatican and Vietnam
- 9 September 2016: Ireland

Cancelled:

- 17 May 2016: Morocco and Niger
- 9 September 2016: Algeria, Angola, China,^{*} Colombia,^{*} Cuba, Djibouti, Eritrea, India, Ghana, Liberia, Mauritania, Nepal, Oman, Qatar,^{*} Senegal, Serbia,^{*} Sri Lanka, Tajikistan, Togo, Turkmenistan, United Arab Emirates^{*}
- 25 March 2020: All ”Visa on arrival” countries are required to have e-Visa. Malawi does not issue visas on arrival anymore. There is no information available if this is permanent change or temporary due to the COVID-19 pandemic.

_{* - these countries are in both lists (visa on arrival and visa is required)}

=== Non-ordinary passports ===
Holders of diplomatic, official / service passports of any country traveling on duty, citizens from the Southern African Development Community countries, citizens from the Common Market for Eastern and Southern Africa countries, holders of Laissez-Passer whilst on official SADC business, holders of United Nations Laissez-Passer whilst on official UN business, holders of African Union Laissez-Passer whilst on official AU business; holders of African Development Bank Laissez-Passer whilst on official ADB business may enter Malawi without a visa for up to 30 days.

== Visa on arrival ==
According to IATA Timatic and documents published by the High Commission of Malawi in the United Kingdom and the Malawi Department of Tourism, citizens of all countries that are not visa-exempt may obtain a visa on arrival. This does not apply to citizens of the following countries:

- Afghanistan
- Algeria
- Bangladesh
- Burkina Faso
- Burundi
- Cameroon
- Central African Republic
- Chad
- China
- DR Congo
- Djibouti
- Egypt
- Eritrea
- Ethiopia
- India
- Iran
- Iraq
- Kazakhstan
- Kosovo
- Lebanon
- Liberia
- Libya
- Mali
- Mauritania
- Morocco
- Nepal
- Niger
- Nigeria
- Oman
- Pakistan
- Palestine
- Qatar
- Russia
- Senegal
- Serbia
- Somalia
- South Sudan
- Sri Lanka
- Sudan
- Syria
- Tajikistan
- Togo
- Tunisia
- Turkey
- Turkmenistan
- Ukraine
- Uzbekistan
- Yemen

== Electronic visa (e-Visa) ==
Malawi launched an e-Visa application system on 1 November 2019. The government recommends that all non-exempt travellers use this platform to ensure smoother entry.

== See also ==
- Visa requirements for Malawian citizens
