= Foreign relations of Malawi =

Malawi's former President Bakili Muluzi continued the pro-Western foreign policy established by his predecessor, Hastings Banda. It maintains excellent diplomatic relations with principal Western countries. Malawi's close relations with South Africa throughout the apartheid era strained its relations with other African nations. Following the collapse of apartheid in 1994, Malawi developed, and currently maintains, strong diplomatic relations with all African countries.

== Bilateral donors ==
Important bilateral donors include Canada, Denmark, Germany, Ireland, Iceland, Japan, South Korea, the Netherlands, Norway, Sweden, Republic of China (Taiwan), the United Kingdom, and the United States. Multilateral donors include the World Bank, the International Monetary Fund, the European Union, the African Development Bank, and the United Nations organizations.

== SADC ==
Malawi assumed the chair of the Southern African Development Community (SADC) in 2001. Muluzi took an active role in SADC on issues such as the global coalition against terrorism and land reform in Zimbabwe.

== ACP ==
Malawi has been a member of the ACP group since Lomé I and is also a party to the Cotonou Agreement, the partnership agreement between the European Community/European Union and 77 states from Africa, the Caribbean and the Pacific.

== Memberships in international organizations ==
Malawi is a member of the following international organizations: the Commonwealth of Nations, the United Nations and some of its specialized and related agencies (i.e. UNCTAD, UNESCO, UNIDO), IMF, World Bank, Multilateral Investment Guarantee Agency (MIGA), World Intellectual Property Organization (WIPO), Berne Convention, Universal Copyright Convention, Organization of African Unity (OAU), Common Market for Eastern and Southern Africa, Lomé Convention, African Development Bank (AFDB), Southern African Development Community (SADC), the Common Market for Eastern and Southern Africa (COMESA), Non-Aligned Movement, G-77, and the World Health Organization (WHO).

Malawi is also a member of the International Criminal Court with a Bilateral Immunity Agreement of protection for the US-military (as covered under Article 98).

== Diplomatic relations ==
List of countries which Malawi maintains diplomatic relations with:

#	Country	Date
1	United Kingdom	6 July 1964
2	France	6 July 1964
3	Germany	6 July 1964
4	United States	6 July 1964
5	Ghana	8 July 1964
6	Israel	15 July 1964
7	Ethiopia	30 July 1964
8	India	19 October 1964
9	Egypt	25 November 1964
10	Norway	9 March 1965
11	South Korea	9 March 1965
12	Portugal	27 May 1965
13	Kenya	28 September 1965
14	Austria	2 December 1965
15	Netherlands	16 December 1965
16	Pakistan	1965
17	Belgium	28 January 1966
—	Holy See	5 February 1966
18	Denmark	22 February 1966
19	Sweden	31 March 1966
20	Switzerland	19 May 1966
21	Japan	17 June 1966
22	Italy	20 September 1966
23	Botswana	1 July 1967
24	South Africa	10 September 1967
25	Turkey	4 August 1969
26	Nigeria	29 November 1969
27	Greece	30 April 1970
28	Zambia	15 September 1970
29	Iran	5 April 1971
30	Spain	27 October 1972
31	Canada	12 February 1974
32	Cameroon	10 September 1974
33	Lesotho	4 September 1976
34	Luxembourg	28 October 1980
35	Democratic Republic of the Congo	November 1980
36	Algeria	19 June 1981
37	Mozambique	1 July 1981
38	Zimbabwe	17 July 1981
39	Uganda	1981
40	North Korea	25 June 1982
41	Australia	1 July 1983
42	Tanzania	16 May 1985
43	Albania	11 July 1985
44	Romania	15 July 1985
45	Finland	1 May 1986
46	Thailand	1 June 1987
47	Namibia	21 March 1990
48	Brazil	23 August 1990
49	Chile	30 November 1990
50	Hungary	26 December 1990
51	Czech Republic	20 March 1991
52	Malaysia	6 November 1991
53	Poland	10 July 1992
54	Russia	2 November 1993
55	Angola	9 November 1993
56	Slovakia	30 December 1993
57	Bulgaria	23 November 1994
58	Kuwait	19 June 1995
59	United Arab Emirates	12 June 1996
60	Cuba	10 December 1997
61	Serbia	13 February 1998
62	Libya	15 February 1998
63	Turkmenistan	20 February 1998
64	Colombia	30 March 1998
65	Trinidad and Tobago	21 April 1998
66	Bahrain	9 June 1998
67	Iceland	14 August 1998
68	Singapore	24 August 1998
69	Latvia	10 September 1998
—	State of Palestine	23 October 1998
70	Croatia	13 November 1998
71	Mexico	10 December 1998
72	Ukraine	22 December 1998
73	Argentina	11 March 1999
74	Jordan	23 June 1999
75	Saudi Arabia	15 August 1999
76	North Macedonia	27 September 1999
77	Jamaica	30 September 1999
78	Sudan	12 April 2000
79	Cyprus	22 June 2000
80	Brunei	11 October 2000
81	Morocco	31 January 2001
82	Mauritius	9 February 2001
83	Philippines	3 May 2001
84	Seychelles	22 May 2001
85	Rwanda	26 June 2001
86	Belarus	13 July 2001
87	Ireland	2002
88	Azerbaijan	21 May 2004
89	Venezuela	31 January 2007
90	China	28 December 2007
91	Liberia	26 February 2009
92	Sri Lanka	9 June 2011
93	Fiji	25 June 2011
94	Estonia	19 July 2011
95	Cambodia	20 July 2011
96	Malta	21 July 2011
97	Slovenia	21 July 2011
98	Montenegro	16 September 2011
99	Georgia	19 September 2011
100	South Sudan	26 September 2011
101	Bosnia and Herzegovina	18 October 2011
102	Lithuania	18 November 2011
103	Mongolia	21 December 2011
104	Burkina Faso	2011
105	Armenia	20 January 2012
106	Myanmar	30 January 2012
107	Bangladesh	15 March 2012
108	Monaco	31 July 2012
109	Qatar	26 September 2012
110	New Zealand	20 March 2013
111	Indonesia	29 September 2014
112	Niger	8 March 2016
113	Sierra Leone	8 March 2016
114	Senegal	9 March 2016
115	Burundi	4 April 2016
—	Kosovo	20 July 2016
116	Oman	7 December 2016
117	Tunisia	3 May 2017
118	Eritrea	20 July 2017
119	Lebanon	18 October 2017
120	Benin	19 February 2019
121	Gambia	19 September 2019
122	Kyrgyzstan	22 September 2022
123	Maldives	24 September 2022
124	Nicaragua	25 September 2022
125	Comoros	7 October 2022
126	Republic of the Congo	18 October 2022
127	Mauritania	18 October 2022
128	Nepal	16 February 2023
129	Mali	2 August 2023
130	Dominican Republic	1 November 2023
131	San Marino	8 December 2023
132	Iraq	27 June 2024
133	Vietnam	23 September 2024
134	Bahamas	22 October 2024
135	Chad	26 November 2024
136	Somalia	3 July 2025
137	Andorra	24 September 2026
138	Kazakhstan	25 September 2026
—	Sovereign Military Order of Malta	25 September 2026
139	Uruguay	25 September 2026
140	Peru	Unknown

== Bilateral Relations ==
Country	Formal Relations Began	Notes
Australia	1 July 1983	Australia is represented in Malawi by its embassy in Harare.; Both countries are full members of the Commonwealth of Nations.
Botswana	1 July 1967	Both countries established diplomatic relations on 1 July 1967 when first High Commissioner of Botswana Mr. H. Mannathoko presented his credentials to President of Malawi. Both countries are full members of the Southern African Development Community, Commonwealth of Nations and of the Non-Aligned Movement.
Canada	12 February 1974	Both countries established diplomatic relations on 12 February 1974; Both countries are full members of the Commonwealth of Nations.
China	28 December 2007	Hastings Banda recognized the Republic of China (Taiwan) in 1967. In January 2008, Malawi switched this recognition to the People's Republic of China. Since 2008 there has been a significant shift by the Malawian government towards accepting investment from China. Potentially this may be part of a wider power struggle between the East and West in Africa.
Greece	30 April 1970	Greece is represented in Malawi by its embassy in Harare, Zimbabwe.; Malawi is represented in Greece by its embassy in Brussels, Belgium.
India	19 October 1964	See India–Malawi relations Both countries established diplomatic relations on 19 October 1964 when has been accredited Acting High Commissioner of India to Malawi Mr. Dileep S. Kamtekar.
Israel	15 July 1964	See Israel–Malawi relations
Mexico	10 December 1998	Malawi is accredited to Mexico from its embassy in Washington, D.C., United States.; Mexico is accredited to Malawi from its embassy in Pretoria, South Africa.
Mozambique	1 July 1981	See Malawi–Mozambique relations Between 1985 and 1995, Malawi accommodated more than a million refugees from Mozambique. The refugee crisis placed a substantial strain on Malawi's economy but also drew significant inflows of international assistance. The accommodation and eventual repatriation of the Mozambicans is considered a major success by international organizations.
Philippines	3 May 2001	Neither country has an embassy in each other's territories. The Philippines's embassy in Pretoria, South Africa, is accredited to Malawi; on the other hand, Malawi's embassy in Tokyo, Japan, is accredited to the Philippines. As of 25 May 2018, the date of presentation of credentials of Philippine non-resident ambassador Uriel Norman Garibay to President Arthur Peter Mutharika, there are 41 Filipino nationals residing in Malawi, mainly in Blantyre and Lilongwe.
Poland	10 July 1992	See Malawi–Poland relations
Qatar	26 September 2012	Both countries established diplomatic relations on 26 September 2012 when Ambassador of Malawi to Qatar (resident in Kuwait City) Mr. Yunis Abdul Karim has presented his credentials.
Rwanda	26 June 2001	Both countries established diplomatic relations on 26 June 2001 when accredited first Ambassador of Rwanda to Malawi (resident in Dar es Salaam) Mr. Zephyr Mutanguha In 1996, Malawi received a number of Rwandan and Congolese refugees seeking asylum. The government did not turn away refugees, but it did invoke the principle of "first country of asylum." Under this principle, refugees who requested asylum in another country first, or who had the opportunity to do so would not subsequently be granted asylum in Malawi. There were no reports of the forcible repatriation of refugees.
Sahrawi Arab Democratic Republic	24 March 2002	Diplomatic relations existed betwen Malawi and SADR between 2002 and 2017.
South Africa	10 September 1967	See Malawi–South Africa relations The colonial structures of Malawian labour export to South African mines continued after Malawi achieved independence in 1964. Led by dictator Hastings Banda, Malawi was the only African country to maintain close relations with White-ruled South Africa until the 1994 election of Nelson Mandela. Malawians were viewed as important workers in the South African mines due to their "skills, work discipline and lack of militancy" From 1988 to 1992, around 13,000 Malawian migrant laborers were forcefully repatriated out of South Africa. Officially, this was because 200 Malawians had tested positive for HIV in the previous two years, but many believe that it was due to the need for retrenchment of laborers during a crisis in South Africa's mining industry. Since South Africa and Malawi had their first democratic elections in 1994, Malawi and South Africa have enhanced relations. In 2008, the two governments signed a Memorandum of Understanding designed to enhance the relationship between the two countries through enhanced security cooperation.
South Korea	9 March 1965	In 2011 Bilateral Trade between both nations totaled US$31 million.
Turkey	4 August 1969	Embassy of Malawi in Berlin is accredited to Turkey.; Turkish Embassy in Lusaka is accredited to Malawi.; Trade volume between the two countries was US$21 million in 2019 (Malawi's exports/imports: 16.4/4.67 million USD).
Ukraine	22 December 1998	See Malawi–Ukraine relations
United Kingdom	6 July 1964	See Malawi–United Kingdom relations Malawi established diplomatic relations with the United Kingdom on 6 July 1964.: Malawi maintains a high commission in London.; The United Kingdom is accredited to Malawi through its high commission in Lilongwe.; The UK governed Malawi from 1893 until 1964, when Malawi gained full independence. Both countries share common membership of the Commonwealth, the International Criminal Court, and the World Trade Organization. Bilaterally the two countries have a Development Partnership, and a Double Taxation Agreement. Historical ties make the UK historically one of the more important donors and supporters of Malawi. However, the expulsion of the UK's High Commissioner in April 2011 may change this relationship. Since the expulsion the UK has suspended direct government aid, citing concerns over governance and human rights.
United States	6 July 1964	See Malawi–United States relations See also: Cochrane-Dyet 2011 Cable Controversy The transition from a one-party state to a multi-party democracy significantly strengthened the already cordial U.S. relationship with Malawi. Significant numbers of Malawians study in the United States. The United States has an active Peace Corps program, Centers for Disease Control and Prevention, Department of Health and Human Services, and an Agency for International Development (USAID) mission in Malawi. In July 2011, the United States suspended direct funding. The US government agency responsible, the Millennium Challenge Corporation, suspended aid because it was 'deeply upset' by the deaths of the 19 people during the July protests.
Zimbabwe	17 July 1981	Both countries established diplomatic relations on 17 July 1981 when has been appointed first High Commissioner of Malawi to Zimbabwe Mr. M. A. Banda and open High Commission of Malawi in Harare.

== Malawi and the Commonwealth of Nations ==
Malawi became a full member of the Commonwealth of Nations on independence from the United Kingdom in 1964. Queen Elizabeth II, Head of the Commonwealth, was Queen of Malawi, represented by the Governor-General of Malawi, until the country became a republic in the Commonwealth of Nations in 1966, when the then Prime Minister of Malawi, Hastings Banda, declared himself the first President of Malawi.

== See also ==
- List of diplomatic missions in Malawi
- List of diplomatic missions of Malawi
