= Malawi–South Africa relations =

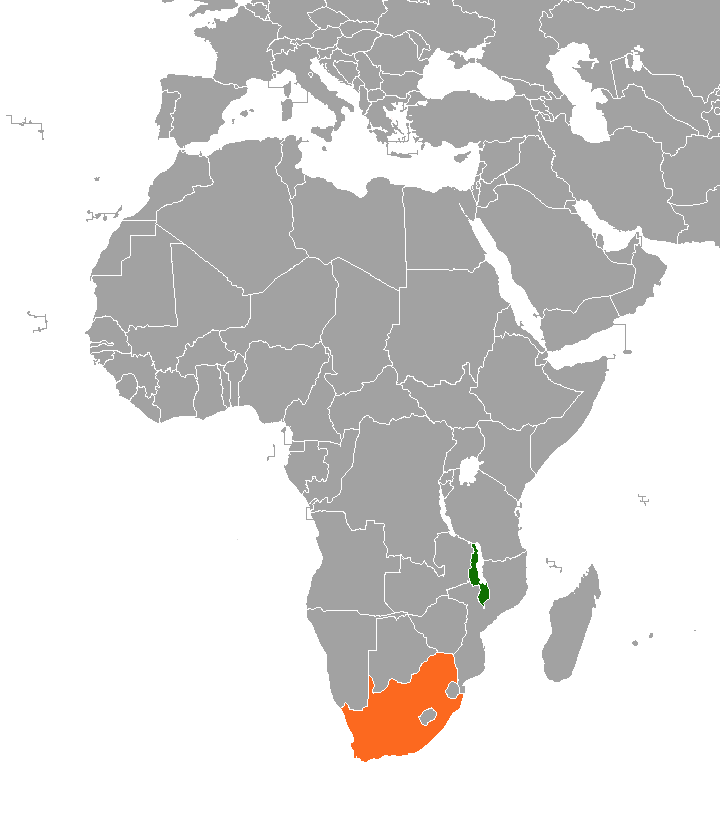
- Malawi: South Africa

Malawi–South Africa relations refers to the bilateral relationship between Malawi and South Africa. South Africa's first formal relationship with an independent African country was established with Malawi, beginning in 1967.

Both countries are republics in the Commonwealth of Nations and members of the African Union and Group of 77.

Malawi has a High Commission in Pretoria, and South Africa has a High Commission in Lilongwe.

== Historical relations ==
Under colonial economic systems, many people from Malawi (then Nyasaland) without access to land or markets migrated to other areas, including South Africa, for contract labor. These labor migrants were typically men who worked abroad for two years under contract with recruiters such as the Witwatersrand Native Labour Association (Wenela). Internal recruitment of Malawian labor for South African mines was suspended from 1907 to 1936 due to high illness and mortality rates, but agreements in the 1930s between the South Africa and Nyasaland governments allowed for the re-opening of a controlled migrant labor flow.

=== Post-colonial policy (1964–1992) ===
The colonial structures of Malawian labour export to South African mines continued after Malawi achieved independence in 1964. Led by the then named president for Life Hastings Banda, Malawi was the only African ruled country to maintain close relations with White-ruled South Africa until the 1994 election of Nelson Mandela. Malawians were viewed as important workers in the South African mines due to their "skills, work discipline and lack of militancy".

==== Banda's apartheid-era policy ====
Malawi was the only country in Africa to maintain diplomatic relations with South Africa during the apartheid era. Hastings Banda was the first black President ever to visit South Africa in 1971 and the first foreign head of state to come since the United Kingdom's King George VI's royal visit in 1947. During his visit, Banda received a 21-gun salute and an official welcome from State President Jacobus Johannes Fouché. White students at the Stellenbosch University applauded him and sang accolades. Following a state visit by South African Prime Minister John Vorster to Malawi in 1970, Banda was quoted as saying: "We have to start talking to each other. I go to South Africa. You come here. I allow your people to come here and see how the people live. This might not solve the problem today, next month, in five years, ten years, or even twenty years. But I honestly believe that this in the end is the only solution." His position on South Africa was that "It is only contact like this [between South Africa and Malawi] that can reveal to your people that there are civilised people other than white..." However, his non-isolationist approach to the National Party-ruled apartheid government alienated him from other African countries and Pan Africanist leaders who had just gained independence. By visiting South Africa, he had defied the 41-member Organisation of African Unity (OAU). Tanzania's government paper called on the OAU to expel Malawi in order to isolate Banda and "further alienate Banda from all those who believe in the equality of man." Kenyan newspaper the Daily Nation thought his visit to South Africa would "set into motion a train of diplomatic events that may well make nonsense of Africa's commitment to the liberation of the millions of black people who still live under colonial or racist subjugation" if other African leaders followed suit. In response, Banda called African leaders hypocrites, highlighting that they oppressed their own people but preached unity and equality.

==== Banda-era transition period 1990–1994 ====
During the transition period for both Malawi (transitioning from one party to multi-party democracy) and South Africa (transitioning from Apartheid to a multi-party democracy), the Malawian government's future relations with South Africa were not secure due to Malawi's past relationship with the apartheid government. Some leaders of the anti-apartheid movement did not support the Banda government or retaining ties with Malawi. South Africa was Malawi's largest trading partner and host to many Malawian labourers so relations with South Africa was still vital to Malawi. From 1988 to 1992, around 13,000 Malawian migrant labourers were forcefully repatriated out of South Africa. The official explanation for these repatriations was that 200 Malawians had tested positive for HIV in the previous two years; however, many believe that it was due to the need for retrenchment of labourers during a crisis in South Africa's mining industry.

The Malawian government made efforts to set straight its stance on South Africa by hosting ANC leader Nelson Mandela. A visit which was made possible due to efforts by Malawian diplomats resident in South Africa, including acting Ambassador Percy Kachipande. It was revealed shortly afterwards, that Kamuzu Banda had been secretly assisting the ANC during the apartheid era. The Malawian government pledged election support and continued support to the ANC government and diplomatic relations continued between the two countries.

==== Post-transition era reactions to Banda's policy (1994–1999) ====
In a submission to the Truth and Reconciliation Commission by former South African State President F W De Klerk of the National Party, De Klerk argued that sanctions and isolation against South Africa by the international community were a factor in dismantling apartheid but "more often than not, they served to retard reform rather than stimulate it." De Klerk notes that,

"The Government was always more inclined to listen to the advice of countries that maintained contact with it...the decision of Malawi to send black diplomats to Pretoria was far more effective in exposing the logical and logistical absurdities of apartheid than any number of resolutions by the United Nations."

- Also See:Hastings Banda#Relations with South Africa

== Political relations ==
Since both South Africa and Malawi had their first multiparty democratic elections in 1994, Malawi and South Africa have enhanced relations. In 2008, the two governments signed a Memorandum of Understanding designed to enhance the relationship between the two countries through enhanced security cooperation. Skilled Labor competition and the issuance of work permits from Malawi became problematic as South Africa tried to create jobs for local South Africans.

In March 2025, a Malawian court provisionally upheld South Africa’s extradition request for Shepherd Bushiri, a Malawian evangelical leader who fled South Africa in 2020 while facing fraud and rape charges. On 20 April 2025 Floyd Shivambu, then newly appointed secretary-general of Jacob Zuma’s uMkhonto weSizwe (MK) party, traveled to Malawi to attend a service at Bushiri’s church, drawing criticism from South African authorities. South Africa’s Minister of Justice and Constitutional Development, Mmamoloko Kubayi, condemned the visit as “a blatant act of disrespect toward South Africa’s legal system” that risked encouraging impunity. The MK party subsequently clarified that Shivambu had acted in a personal capacity, reaffirming its stance against gender-based violence and the exploitation of vulnerable communities.
