= Ntcheu =

- Location in Malawi
- Coordinates: 14°50′S 34°40′E
- Country: Malawi
- Region: Central Region
- District: Ntcheu District
- Elevation: 4,403 ft (1,342 m)

Population (2018 Census)
  - Total: 21,241
- Time zone: +2
- Climate: Cwa

Ntcheu is a town located in the Central Region of Malawi. It is the administrative capital of Ntcheu District. Ntcheu is known for its produce, including potatoes.

== Demographics ==
Year	Population
1987	5,814
1998	8,783
2008	14,642
2018	21,241
