= Capital punishment in Malawi =

Capital punishment in Malawi is a legal punishment for certain crimes. The country abolished the death penalty following a Malawian Supreme Court ruling in 2021, but it was soon reinstated. However, the country is currently under a death penalty moratorium, which has been in place since the latest execution in 1992.

== Capital punishment law ==
In 2007, the Supreme Court of Malawi ruled in the case of Kafantayeni and Others v. Attorney General that it was unconstitutional to make the death penalty mandatory for murder or treason convictions. The ruling allowed judges to have discretion when deciding on sentences for murder convicts or those convicted of treason. In deciding on an appropriate sentence in a case, judges were to consider whether or not the inmate had a significant prior criminal record, mental illness, poverty, drug or alcohol intoxication, old age, youth, trauma, or a "sincere belief in witchcraft" at the time of the crime and/or at sentencing. Four years after the court decision outlawing the mandatory death penalty, the Malawian Penal Code was updated to reflect the introduction of sentencing discretion in murder and treason cases. The death penalty was an optional punishment for rape, armed robbery, and burglary, all of which could also be punished with life imprisonment. No convicts sentenced to death in Malawi since 1995 have been condemned for any crime other than murder.

Malawi also prohibits the death penalty for convicts who were under 18 at the commission of their crimes, as well as for pregnant women, inmates with intellectual disabilities, or inmates who have a mental illness that prohibits them from understanding their actions.

All death row inmates are housed in Malawi's only maximum security prison, located in Zomba. Executions have historically taken place at the prison in Zomba as well.

== Precolonial and colonial history ==
Prior to Malawi becoming a protectorate of the British Empire, the region's criminal justice system revolved more around the idea of compensation for wrongs and social solidarity. Precolonial communities in the region seldom inflicted physical or severe punishments for antisocial or criminal behaviours unless a perpetrator failed to pay lipo, a fine for damages. Hector Duff, a former Chief Secretary of the British Empire, erroneously claimed that in southern Africa's precolonial law, "Murder, battery, abduction, robbery, theft: these are the principal crimes which [the African] recognizes, and all of them. . . . he was wont to punish, according to his severe and simple code, by the supreme penalty of death."

Some scholars consider the usage of the death penalty in Africa to be "very much a part of the legacy of colonialism." In 1930, British authorities imposed a "Model Criminal Code" on its African colonies, making it mandatory for judges to impose the death penalty for inmates convicted of murder or treason. The death penalty remained optional for rape, armed robbery, and burglary. It was very common for British colonies to adopt hanging as a method of execution, as Malawi did.

Colonial courts often relied on dehumanizing African murderers and playing on racial tropes to convince a jury that an African defendant was dangerous enough to deserve a death sentence. Most executions in colonial Africa occurred in cases of premeditated murder, excessive violence, pecuniary motives, and especially cases of African colonists perpetrating crimes against colonial authorities. People convicted of murder under the colonial system would appeal first to the High Court of their region; next, they would appeal to their regional Courts of Appeal; and finally, their last resort would be to appeal to the Judicial Committee of the Privy Council in London. Once that final appeal failed, the execution could proceed. Between 1903 and 1947, Nyasaland (which is modern-day Malawi) passed 897 death sentences and carried out 181 executions, while 197 people had their death sentences commuted. In 1910, Nyasaland employed an African man named Mwamadi to serve as the official hangman of the region; although public hangings in Britain were abolished in 1868, many of the executions Mwamadi carried out were public.

Malawi's maximum security prison, the Central Prison located in Zomba, was constructed in 1920. Public executions were commonplace until 1924, when two men known as Jim and Makoshonga suffered botched executions in public; one had to be hanged twice, and the other was shot in the head after the rope gave way and dropped him to the ground. The scandal from this incident prompted Nyasaland to centralize all executions to one location and carry them out in private behind prison walls. Until Malawi temporarily abolished capital punishment in 2021, death row and the death chamber were still located at the Central Prison in Zomba.

== Postcolonial history ==
Colonial rule in Malawi ended in 1964. Hastings Banda led a totalitarian dictatorship in the nation for the next 30 years, maintaining the colonial-era penal code and its provisions for a mandatory death penalty. Under Banda's rule, there were at least 823 death sentences imposed in Malawi between 1972 and 1993, and 299 of those were carried out. The other death row inmates either died while awaiting execution, or they received pardons.

In the final year that Malawi carried out executions, there were approximately twelve inmates put to death, all by hanging, the only execution method permitted under Malawian death penalty law. Malawi's last execution prior to abolition occurred on September 26, 1992, in the prison in Zomba; Malawi allegedly hired a hangman from South Africa to carry out the death sentence.

Following the 1994 election of Malawi's first democratically elected president, Bakili Muluzi, a de facto moratorium on executions went into effect, meaning that the nation ceased carrying out executions without passing a law or declaring an official moratorium. President Muluzi was an opponent of capital punishment who, upon taking power, immediately commuted all active death sentences to life imprisonment. Nevertheless, even after President Muluzi issued his commutations, Malawian courts continued issuing mandatory death sentences in murder cases. Muluzi would again commute all death sentences to life on July 23, 1997, while pledging not to sign any execution orders. He commuted all death sentences once more on April 9, 2004, commuting 79 death sentences to life imprisonment and releasing another 320 inmates from prison altogether in his final year in office. That year, President Bingu wa Mutharika was elected. From his inauguration in 2004 to his death in April 2012, he refused to commute any death sentences or grant any inmates reprieves, but he also refused to sign any death warrants, thus further establishing Malawi's status as a de facto abolitionist nation.

Following the 2007 ruling prohibiting mandatory death sentences in Malawi, over 180 death row inmates won the right to a re-sentencing hearing. However, by 2012, none of those inmates had actually had their re-sentencing hearing take place. The World Coalition to Abolish the Death Penalty blamed the lack of re-sentencing hearings on the fact that none of the 180 inmates could retain private lawyers, as indigent inmates were reliant on aid from public attorneys, many of whom lived far from the Zomba Maximum Security Prison in Zomba, Malawi, where the nation's death row was located. The coalition expressed concern that inmates would die before they would get a chance to genuinely appeal their mandatory death sentences, as the life expectancy in Malawian prisons was 10 years due to overcrowding and rampant disease. To address this problem, the Kafantayeni Resentencing Project aided over 150 inmates who had received unconstitutional mandatory death sentences, particularly those whose court files were missing or lost.

By the end of 2020, there were 27 death row inmates in Malawi.

== Notable cases ==
From January 23–26, 1915, the Chilembwe uprising occurred in Malawi while it was still a British protectorate called Nyasaland; the leader of the uprising, John Chilembwe, was shot and killed by a police patrol on February 3, 1915. After the uprising was quelled, 36 Malawians were executed after convictions of murder and high treason. Unlike most British colonial executions, which were carried out by hanging, some of these executions were carried out by firing squad. To maximize the deterrent effect, some of the uprising's ringleaders were publicly hanged on a main road close to an estate where many European colonial authorities had been killed during the uprising.

Starting in November 1968, a rash of over 30 killings known as the Chilobwe murders took place in the suburbs of Blantyre. While the murders were very unlikely to have all been committed by one individual, only one man ever went on trial for them. On March 7, 1970, Walla Laini Kawisa was arrested after his fingerprints were found at the scene of an attempted burglary that was unrelated to any of the murders. While in custody, Kawisa made several confessions to some of the murders. In October 1971, he was sentenced to death, with his sentencing judge declaring that Kawisa's motive for carrying out the murders was to overthrow the Malawian government. As he had pleaded guilty, Malawian courts prohibited Kawisa from appealing his sentence. Purportedly, he was executed by hanging in May 1972, although no Malawian officials made a public announcement confirming that an execution took place.

In late April 1969, eight Malawians were executed for attempting to assassinate President Hastings Banda and overthrow his government. Malawian security forces discovered and thwarted the plan in October 1967, and the inmates received their death sentences for treason, at the time a crime that carried the mandatory death penalty, in June 1968. The hangings took place in Blantyre.

On October 27 and November 10, 1976, respectively, Albert Muwalo, the former Minister of State in President Hastings Banda's office, and Focus Gwede, the former Head of the Malawi Security Police, were arrested on suspicions that they were involved in a plot to assassinate President Banda and overthrow his government. The two appeared before a court in January 1977 and were both sentenced to death on February 14. They were given a 30-day window in which they could appeal their death sentences, but their appeals were rejected in April and the death sentences were upheld. Muwalo was executed by hanging in the prison in Zomba on September 3, 1977. While Amnesty International initially reported that Gwede was hanged as well, he was actually held as a political prisoner until his release from prison in 1993 and reportedly died a free man in 2011.

In a report on the death penalty published in 1979, Amnesty International reported that Malawi carried out at least 35 legal executions in the first four months of the year.

Around 2005, Ishmail Gome was sentenced to death for the murder of his local political rival, with the motive presented in court being that Gome wanted to replace his rival as the chieftain of a village. The physical evidence suggested that his co-defendant, Pitilizani Chabuka, who received a life sentence in exchange for his testimony against Gome, was the sole perpetrator. After consulting the International Human Rights Clinic for legal assistance, Gome was released from death row on June 28, 2017, and Chabuka admitted that he had fabricated the charges against Gome.

=== Albinism-related murders and the death penalty ===
Around 2014, Malawian officials responded to a spate of murders and mutilations against people with albinism by promising harsher punishments against their assailants, including the death penalty. The crimes were often motivated by their attackers' and killers' desires to use the skin of people with albinism to increase their wealth and fortune. The International Bar Association condemned Malawi's response to the killings, stating that increasing the usage of the death penalty was not the proper response to the increase in attacks and that Malawi's imposition of the death penalty in these cases went against the worldwide trend of abolishing the death penalty.

In August 2015, Priscott Pepuzani, an albino citizen of Malawi, was murdered and mutilated for his skin. Mchinji District High Court Judge Esmey Chombo imposed death sentences against Douglas Mwale, Sophie Jere, and Fontino Folosani for their involvement in the murder, claiming that she hoped the death sentences would send "a strong message" to others who wished to commit such crimes against people with albinism.

In April 2016, Enelesi Nkhata, a 21-year-old woman with albinism, was murdered. Four of her assailants, who maimed her alive and left her to die of her injuries in the Mchinji District, received the death penalty; Gerlad Phiri, Medson Madzialenga, Jameson Baluwa and Steven Chingombe were condemned for murder and transacting in human tissue, while five other defendants who were only convicted on the charges of transacting in human tissue, Isaac Phiri, Mcdonald Kanyerere, Damiano Phiri, Isaac Msambalume and Damson Manyani, received life sentences.

In 2017, 19-year-old albino teenager Mphatso Pensulo was murdered by 28-year-old Willard Mikaele, who was motivated by his thoughts that using Pensulo's skin in a ritual with a witch doctor would bring him wealth. In May 2019, Mikaele was sentenced to death for the murder, with Malawian courts declaring that their particularly tough stance in his case was in response to what they saw as a recent surge of attacks against albino citizens.

On April 3, 2016, Whitney Chilumpha, a 23-month-old baby girl with albinism, was abducted from her mother's side while sleeping in her home near the town of Kasungu. Twelve days later, the girl's skull, teeth, and clothes were discovered; she had been murdered and dismembered by her father, 30-year-old White Chilumpha, and 23-year-old James Kanjira. On September 18, 2020, Judge Ivy Kamanga sentenced the two to death for the murder, while a 24-year-old accomplice named Laston Phiri was sentenced to 10 years in prison.

== Abolition, response, and reinstatement ==
=== Abolition ===
Malawi is a signatory to several treaties that commit them to protecting the human rights of the people within their borders, including the International Covenant on Civil and Political Rights, the First Optional Protocol to the International Covenant on Civil and Political Rights, the Convention against Torture and Other Cruel, Inhuman and Degrading Treatment and Punishment, and the Statute of the International Criminal Court—the latter of which specifically commits signatories to abolishing the death penalty from their penal codes.

On 28 April 2021, the Supreme Court of Malawi ruled that the death penalty was unconstitutional, thereby abolishing it. The ruling was issued in response to a Malawian death row inmate appealing his sentence on the grounds that the death penalty itself was unconstitutional, and the Supreme Court agreed. In their judgment, they stated, "The death penalty. . . . is tainted by the unconstitutionality discussed." They also stated that the death penalty was in violation of the Constitution of Malawi, which, in Chapter IV, section 16, contains a provision protecting every citizen's "right to life." The ruling also included a requirement for courts to re-sentence all of the 27 convicts on Malawi's death row at the time. The maximum sentence that an inmate in Malawi may receive for any crime is now life imprisonment.

=== Response ===
Human rights groups such as Amnesty International and Malawi's Centre for Human Rights and Rehabilitation welcomed the abolition, with the CHRR's executive director, Michael Kaiyatsa, stating in response, "For us, an effective punishment is life imprisonment, not [the] death penalty. There is also no evidence anywhere in the world that [the] death sentence has contributed to [a] reduction in murder or killings." Amnesty International's Regional Director for East and Southern Africa, Deprose Muchena, called the abolition of Malawi's death penalty "a vital victory against the death penalty" that "strengthens the right to life in the country." He also criticized the fact that many sub-Saharan African nations still retain the death penalty and expressed a desire that Malawi might serve as an example to them. The Parliamentarians for Global Action praised Malawi for abolishing the death penalty as well, noting that the abolition made the nation the 22nd in sub-Saharan Africa to abolish the death penalty, following Chad in April 2020.

However, the abolition of the death penalty was criticized by others, such as Malawian social commentator Humphrey Mvula, who feared that the lack of capital punishment in the country could lead to mob justice. He stated his concern that potential murderers would no longer be deterred from acting because of the absence of the death penalty as a threat; he also stated his concern that lynch mobs would be motivated to kill because they would feel that there was no way courts could use the severe penalty of death to punish people who aggrieved them. The President of Malawi's Association of People with Albinism, Ian Simbota, also expressed concerns that the abolition of the death penalty would lead to a spike in attacks on people with albinism, as well as a spike in mob justice against attackers who could no longer face the death penalty.

=== Reinstatement ===
On 19 August 2021, following an appeal, the Supreme Court of Malawi overturned their judgment from April which had declared that the death penalty was unconstitutional. The April decision was based on an appeal filed by Charles Khoviwa, a death row inmate who challenged his death sentence following his conviction for murder. In their decision overturning the abolition of the death penalty, the Supreme Court decreed that the matter of the death penalty's legality was not a decision that should have been left up to the Supreme Court based on the substance of Khoviwa's appeal, which purportedly did not challenge the legality of the death penalty. Their ruling also alleged that a particular justice on the court, Dunstan Mwaungulu, had published an opinion that reflected his own personal thoughts rather than reflecting the views of the majority of the justices. The ruling, in effect, reinstated the death penalty as a legal punishment in Malawi.

Since the death penalty's reinstatement, several national and international entities, including the United Kingdom and the Malawian Parliament's Legal Affairs Committee, have continued to advocate for the abolition of the death penalty in Malawi. Shortly following the reinstatement of the death penalty, the British High Commission to Malawi stated the UK's opposition to the death penalty in all cases "as a matter of principle," offering to share the UK's experience with abolishing the death penalty, and pointing out that at least 80 percent of the member nations in the African Union had abolished the death penalty either in law (de jure) or in practice (de facto) following the United Nations' General Assembly resolution for a death penalty moratorium worldwide. Malawi's Centre for Human Rights, Education, Advice and Assistance reiterated their support for Malawi abolishing the death penalty, criticizing Malawi for reinstating the death penalty in spite of its system of capital punishment being dormant since the country attained multiparty democracy.

In May 2022, over twenty separate institutions submitted oral and written statements in a meeting concerning their desire to see the death penalty abolished. Youth and Society Executive Director Charles Kajoloweka stated that he believed the death penalty to be in violation of a person's right to life, citing Amnesty International's research on executions following "grossly unfair trials," confessions extracted by torture, and "inadequate legal representation." A University of Malawi professor, Alexious Kamangira, submitted a statement saying that research reveals that the death penalty is an ineffective deterrent to murder and that countries that had outlawed the death penalty saw a decrease in homicide cases following abolition.

Some entities insisted that the death penalty should be maintained, including the executive director of Church and Society, Moses Mkandawire, who still believed that the death penalty was a deterrent to crime. One Legal Affairs Committee member, Peter Dimba, stated that he wanted to consult public opinion before making a decision on abolishing the death penalty.

In May 2022, there were still 25 people on Malawi's death row.
