= Byson Kaula =

Malawian farmer, counsellor, and activist (1954–2021)

- Born: 1954
- Died: 2021
- Occupation(s): Farmer; Counsellor and activist
- Known for: Avoiding execution three times
- Spouse: Rose Kaula

Byson Kaula (1954 – 2021) was a Malawian man who became a "giant symbol of the fight against the death penalty" after avoiding execution three times. His case is notable due to the circumstances; Kaula was slated for execution three times but each time the hangman was too fatigued to carry out the sentence.

== Murder conviction ==
Kaula, who grew up in Malawi but had previously worked in South Africa in the gasoline industry, returned to Malawi in the 1990s and used the money he had earned to start a wheat farm. On August 28, 1991, a farm worker named Makiyi Thomson died under unclear circumstances; Kaula (in his forties at the time) claimed that neighbors had attacked the man and he tried to take the victim to the hospital but accidentally dropped him, while the neighbors accused claimed that Kaula had killed the man. Kaula was convicted of murder and sentenced to death, which was the mandatory sentence for murder at the time.

Kaula remained in prison for twenty-three years. During this period, his execution was due to take place on three occasions. At that time, there was only one executioner who would travel from prison to prison executing convicts. Each time he was scheduled to be executed, Kaula was told that the hangman was too tired from executing others to continue and he would be spared until the hangman returned. On one occasion, Kaula was the only prisoner to be spared.

== Release and later life ==
In 2007, the Supreme Court of Malawi ruled that the mandatory death sentence for murder was illegal. Kaula, through the non-profit organisation Reprieve, was able to bring his case before the Supreme Court for review on the grounds that he had not received a fair trial. The court then ordered Kaula's release. By now in his sixties, Kaula began working as a counsellor for ex-prisoners at a halfway house. Kaula was also a highly influential activist as he campaigned against capital punishment in Malawi. He died in 2021.

== Personal life ==
Kaula was married to a woman named Rose, who died while he was in prison.
