= Chipeta (disambiguation) =

Chipeta (1844–1924) was a Native American diplomat and Indian rights advocate.

Chipeta may also refer to:

== People ==
- Mapopa Chipeta, Malawian politician
- Erick Chipeta, Zimbabwean footballer
- Philimon Chipeta, Zambian footballer

== Places ==
- Chipeta (commune), one of the 618 Communes of Angola
- Chipeta Golf Course, in Grand Junction, Colorado

== Biology ==
- Chipeta, a synonym of the moth genus Peoria (moth)
