= Andrew K.C. Nyirenda =

Malawian judge

His Lordship The Honourable Andrew K.C. Nyirenda SC JA

Chief Justice of Malawi
- March 2015 – December 2021
- Preceded by: Anastasia Msosa
- Succeeded by: Rizine Mzikamanda

Personal details
- Born: 26 December 1956 (age 69) Bunda Village, Traditional Authority Boghoyo, in Nkhata Bay
- Spouse: married
- Children: 3 sons
- Education: University of Malawi; University of Hull

Andrew K.C. Nyirenda (26 December 1956) is the former Chief Justice of Malawi. He was appointed in March 2015 at Sanjika Palace by President Peter Mutharika.

== Education ==
He has a Bachelor of Laws from Chancellor College of the University of Malawi which he received in 1980 and a Masters of Laws from Hull University, England obtained in 1985.

== Career ==
He worked for the Malawi Ministry of Justice in 1980 as a State Advocate. In 1983 he became Legal Aid Advocate. In 1984 he became the principal State Advocate. In 1991, he was further promoted to the position Chief State Advocate. In 1992 he was promoted again to the post of Chief Public Prosecutor (now Director of Public Prosecutions). It was from that position that Nyirenda was appointed to Judge of the High Court. On 3 June 2008 He was also appointed as Justice of Appeal. He was eventually elevated to Chief Justice of the Republic of Malawi on 12 March 2015.

He has written about his opinion of the role of courts on protecting vulnerable people in Malawi.
