= Anthony Kamanga =

Malawian lawyer

Anthony D. Kamanga is a lawyer who has held various senior official positions in Malawi including Solicitor General. On 6 December 2012 he became the Attorney General of Malawi.

== Career ==
Kamanga earned an LLB (Bachelor of Laws) in Malawi in 1978, an LLM (Master of Laws) in Toronto, Ontario, Canada in 1982 and a Diploma in Legal Drafting in Ottawa, Ontario, Canada in 1993. He was appointed Senior Counsel by the State President in 2004. Kamanga was legal counsel to the Malawi Government for over twenty years. He was responsible for international financial transactions with the World Bank Group, the African Development Bank and other multilateral financial institutions.

Kamanga was appointed Chief Parliamentary Draftsman in the Ministry of Justice, and was appointed a Commissioner when the Privatization Commission was established. He was a member of the Constitutional Review Commission from August 2006 until July 2007, when he was appointed Solicitor General and Principal Secretary for the Ministry of Justice and Constitutional Affairs.

== Controversy ==
In June 2009, Kamanga said that the department of justice was failing to execute its programs due to inadequate office equipment. In December 2010, Kamanga yielded to pressure from George Chaponda, Malawi's Justice and Constitutional Affairs Minister, to enable Chaponda to use just over MK2 million ($13,000) of government money to travel to Geneva, Switzerland to attend a personal function. In January 2011, a bill was passed giving the government the power to close print media outlets that published material it deems "contrary to the public interest". Kamanga defended the law, saying the Minister of Information must have "reasonable grounds" for such a closure, and that decisions could be challenged in court. He said the amendment was based on the recommendation of the Malawi Law Commission, and "takes into consideration fundamental freedoms as enshrined in the constitution".

== Local Courts bill ==
Kamanga assisted in drafting the Local Courts bill, which would give authority to traditional courts to hear minor, non-criminal cases, and was passed by parliament in February 2011. The bill was controversial. Traditional courts had been tools for political persecution in the past, and were banned by Bakili Muluzi in 1994 after he won the first multi-party elections following independence. Opposition leaders and human rights activists expressed concerns that the chiefs would abuse the authority of the revived traditional courts, and that the Judiciary would lose power. Kamanga defended the law, saying the traditional courts would operate only at the local level, with a jurisdiction limited to small matters.

The Local Courts bill includes a clause that bans fouling the air: "Any person who vitiates the atmosphere in any place so as to make it noxious to the public to the health of persons in general dwelling or carrying on business in the neighbourhood or passing along a public way shall be guilty of a misdemeanour". Speaking on Capital Radio's Straight Talk program, Justice Minister Chaponda said that legislation bans farting in public places and makes it a criminal offense. The story was quickly picked up by the foreign press, particularly the British tabloids. Kamanga contradicted Chaponda, saying the bill referred only to air pollution. Later, Chaponda retracted his remarks, saying he had not read the proposed bill before commenting.

== Attorney General ==
Kamanga moved to be Attorney General in 2012. In January 2013 Janet Chikaya Banda was announced as his replacement as Solicitor General, even though she could not be consulted.
