= Janet Banda =

Malawian lawyer and Solicitor general

Janet Chikaya Banda
- Born: January 11, 1970 (age 56); Zomba, Malawi
- Education: St. Michael's Girls Secondary School, Chancellor College, University of Georgia and Birkbeck College
- Occupations: Lawyer and civil servant
- Known for: Solicitor General
- Predecessor: Anthony Kamanga
- Successor: Gertrude Hiwa
- Spouse: Mac Donald Banda

Janet Chikaya-Banda is a Malawian lawyer who became the Solicitor General and a Principal Secretary.

== Early life and education ==
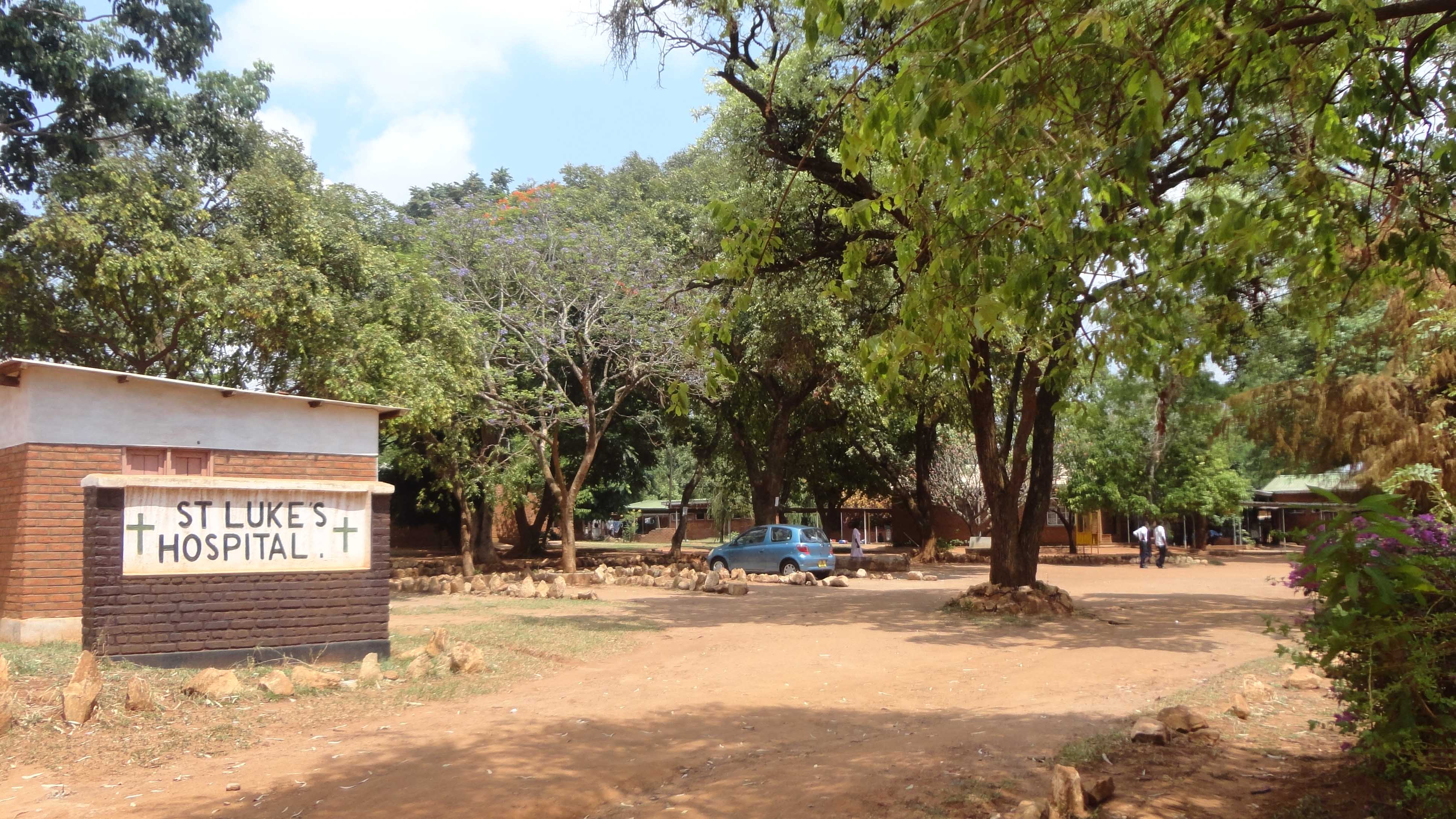
She was born at the Mission Hospital in Malosa

Banda was born on 11 January 1970 in Malosa hospital in Zomba, then the capital of Malawi. She was the sixth of eight children. After her primary education, she attended St. Michael's Girls Secondary School in Mangochi. In 1988, she opted to study Social Sciences at Chancellor College, but decided to switch to law studies to improve potential employment opportunities. After graduation, she worked as a lawyer before taking a position at the Ministry of Justice. She then pursued a masters’ degree at the University of Georgia and a doctorate at London's Birkbeck College.

== Professional career ==
In 2012, she co- authored “Duty of care constitutional and law reform, in Malawi" with Hannah Gibson. The book launch in Lilongwe was hosted by the British think tank Africa Research Institute. She gave a speech and replies included one made by Anthony Kamanga who was the Solicitor General. when Kamanga was appointed Attorney General, Banda replaced him. as the appointment was made while Banda was on vacation, she acted as Solicitor General for three weeks before she learned about her new position.

In 2015, Banda responded on behalf on the government to pressure from the UN, the USA and Europe to abolish the death penalty, noting that no-one had been subjected to the death penalty for some time as it was reduced to life imprisonment. In the matter of legalising homosexuality, Banda said that it will be against the constitution and popular opinion.

In 2017, she was a part of the "Maizegate" investigation team, whereby George Chaponda, Minister of Agriculture, Irrigation and Water development bought 100,000 tonnes of Zambian maize. Following an inquiry initiated by President Peter Mutharika, a Mzuzu High Court suspended Chaponda. Banda took to Facebook in a post that implied that some government bodies were not fully aware of their role, which led to calls for her resignation and accusations of pre-judging the enquiry. In response, she deleted the post and her Facebook account.

In 2018, Gertrude Hiwa replaced Banda as Solicitor General. Banda subsequently became the Principal Secretary at Ministry of Lands.

In 2020, following over 70 deaths from COVID-19, Banda was serving as Deputy Chief Secretary to the government and announced measures in July to address the pandemic.

Banda led the Presidential Delivery Unit in May 2024 as the Deputy Secretary to the President and Cabinet. She noted the progress made on open government- the first time Malawi supported Open Government Week.
