= 2011 Malawian Air Fouling Legislation =

Section of Local Courts bill

The 2011 Malawian Air Fouling Legislation is a section of the Local Courts bill submitted to the parliament of Malawi in February 2011 that bans fouling the air. When the Minister of Justice claimed that the bill made flatulence in public illegal, the story made headlines around the world. Later, the minister retracted his statement.

== History ==
The Local Courts Bill was first introduced in Nyasaland (colonial Malawi) in 1929 under Penal Code Act 22 of the colonial government. It was meant to redefine which types of cases local courts could oversee. The stipulated violations covered under this bill would be under the jurisdiction of local Chiefs. The actual provision against air fouling that was included in the new Penal Code Act 198 was carried over from the Nyasaland laws. This opened up a criticism in Malawi about the government's policy of carrying over antiquated colonial laws and clarification of laws.

== Legislation ==
The relevant clause in the bill reads: "Any person who vitiates the atmosphere in any place so as to make it noxious to the public to the health of persons in general dwelling or carrying on business in the neighbourhood or passing along a public way shall be guilty of a misdemeanour".

=== Additional clauses ===
The bill would also punish "any person disturbing religious assemblies, trespassing on burial places", or "insulting the modesty of a woman", as well as citizens who hinder the burial of dead bodies and people who pretend to be fortune tellers. It also includes making it illegal to challenge someone to fight a duel.

== Interpretation ==
Journalists at the briefing argued that the way the bill was written, it could be interpreted as including a ban on flatulence. The hypothetical example is what was then published in Malawian papers by some Malawian journalists to gain attention for the story about the bill. The sensational story on the banning of flatulence became popular within the country due to its humorous and impractical nature.

=== Minister of Justice's interpretation ===
Minister of Justice George Chaponda, a Yale law school graduate, appeared on Capital Radio Malawi's Straight Talk program. Though flatulence was not the initial target of the bill, Chaponda agreed with the radio host that the legislation could essentially be interpreted as banning farting in public places and making it an official criminal offence. He then took the issue further with a call for social etiquette: "Just go to the toilet when you feel like farting".

Chaponda claimed that Malawi's farting problem was "not there during the time of dictatorship because people were afraid of the consequences. Now because of multipartism or freedom, people would like to fart anywhere". He added, "Nature can be controlled... it becomes a nuisance if people fart anywhere".

He added that the enforcement of such a law would be similar to laws banning urinating in public and would be treated as a minor offence.

=== Solicitor General's interpretation ===
Solicitor General Anthony Kamanga argued that the bill was not intended to include farting but instead, "fouling the air" was a reference to air pollution. He said fouling of the air can be done by burning tyres, rubbish and old computers or smoking, and thus spoiling the atmosphere of the neighbourhood. Kamanga said "How any reasonable or sensible person can construe the provision to criminalizing farting in public is beyond me".

== Reaction ==
When Reuters distributed the story, saying "farting in public will no longer be just rude and discourteous to others, it will now be a crime", it was quickly picked up by the foreign press.

=== British media ===
The bill received attention from British tabloids. The Daily Mirror had the headline "Breaking wind is to become a crime in Malawi" and added "and it is already causing a stink". The Daily Express headline was "Law that put the wind up for you... Malawi bans flatulence". The Register added a sub-headline: "Clampdown on undisciplined bowels".

=== Chaponda's retraction ===
On 4 February 2011, the BBC reported that the Solicitor General Anthony Kamanga had contradicted Chaponda, saying the legislation referred to other forms of pollution. Reporting the controversy, The Register's story was headed "Big stink over Malawi farting ban: Solicitor general challenges trouser cough clampdown".

Later, Chaponda retracted his remarks, saying he had not read the proposed bill before commenting. The head of Capital Radio, which had aired the interview, signed an agreement with the government on 14 February 2011 in which the media committed to refrain from reporting stories that would destroy the image and credibility of the country. Chaponda also notes that the media misunderstood him and the laws. He noted that the reporting of this bill was a reflection of media trying to discredit the Bingu wa Mutharika government.

== Political fallout with media ==
The farting legislation led to further tension between the Malawian press and the Bingu wa Mutharika administration. Relations between the press and the Mutharika administration were strained due to the passage of a publications law that restricted press coverage. The press saw it as a part of on-going attempts by the Mutharika administration to crack down on press and limit democracy during his second term in office. The government saw the reporting as a direct attempt by the Malawian media to discredit and embarrass the Bingu wa Mutharika administration.

=== Media government agreement ===
Following the flatulence issue's international headlines, Malawi President Bingu wa Mutharika signed legislation that allowed the Malawi government to ban publications it deemed "contrary to the public interest". This nationwide media suppression led to widespread frustration among citizens and contributed to the 2011 Malawi Protests.
