= Fern Najere Sadyalunda =

Malawian politician

- Born: 1944; Lilongwe District
- Occupations: Politician, businessperson

Fern Najere Sadyalunda (born September 16, 1944) was a Malawian politician. She was the first woman to serve in the Cabinet of Malawi when she was appointed Minister of Community Development and Social Welfare in October 1975.

== Biography ==
Fern Najere Sadyalunda was born on September 16, 1944, in the village of Sewa in the Lilongwe District. She attended the Kapeni Teacher Training College in Blantyre. She worked briefly as a radio announcer in South Africa while her husband was posted there.

In 1974, she was nominated to represent Lilongwe in the National Assembly. In October 1975, she was appointed to the cabinet of President Hastings Banda. She was suspected of association with Albert Muwalo, who was later executed in 1977 for plotting to overthrow the government. Sadyalunda was imprisoned without trial for six years. Upon her release, she abandoned politics and became a businesswoman.

== Personal life ==
She married Grant Sadyalunda, a civil servant, in 1965. He died in 2014.
