= Nancy Tembo =

Malawian politician

Honourable Nancy Tembo
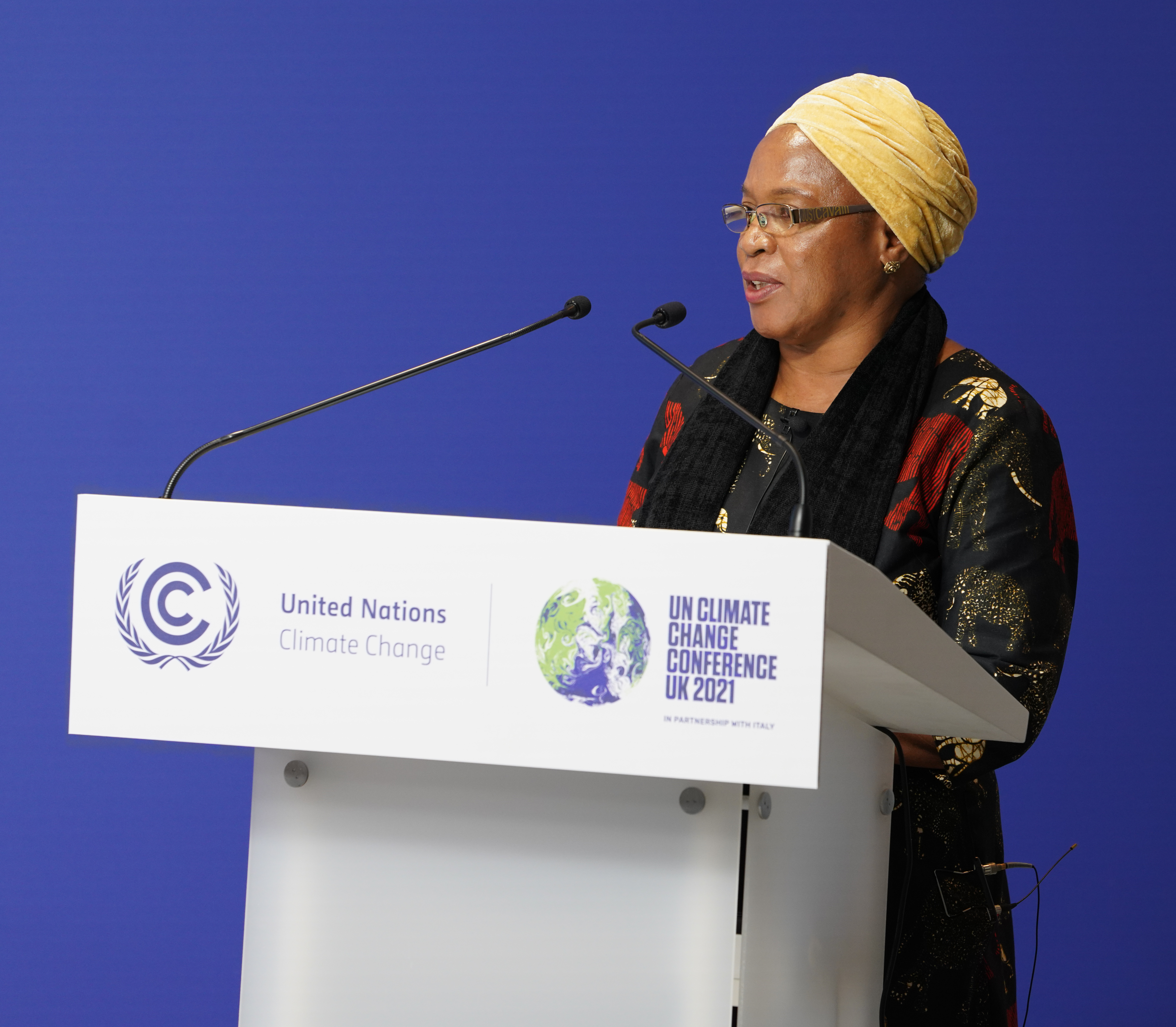
- Tembo speaking at COP26 Climate Change Conference in 2021

Minister of Foreign Affairs
- In office 2022 – 15 September 2025
- President: Lazarus Chakwera
- Preceded by: Eisenhower Nduwa Mkaka
- Succeeded by: George Chaponda

Personal details
- Born: 1959 (age 66–67) Mangochi, Nyasaland (now Malawi)
- Party: Malawi Congress Party
- Education: St Mary's Secondary School, Zomba, Chancellor College and Leeds Beckett University
- Occupation: Politician

Nancy Gladys Tembo is a Malawian politician who served as the Minister of Foreign Affairs in the Malawi Government between 2022 and 2025. She is also a Member of Parliament (MP) representing Lilongwe City Ngwenya constituency in the National Assembly of the Republic of Malawi.

She ran as an independent candidate after a bungled 2018 Malawi Congress Party (MCP) primary election and went on to secure a landslide victory in the 2019 Malawian general election.

She was the voice of the MCP (then the main opposition party) during the Bingu wa Mutharika Presidency (2009-2012). She was detained and badly beaten along with protest leaders such as Billy Mayaya and Undule Mwakasungula during the infamous Protests on July 20, 2011 where 22 people were killed by security forces.

During her first term as Member of Parliament (2004-2009), Tembo was the shadow Minister of Education, chair of the African Parliamentarians Network Against Corruption (APNAC)-Malawi, and served on the Public Accounts Committee and Parliamentary Committee on Health (where she chaired the Parliamentary Sub-Committee on Reproduction).

During her second term as MP, she served on the Commonwealth Parliamentary Association (CPA) and Legal Affairs Committee (LAC)

== Early life and education ==
Nancy Tembo was born in 1959, in Mangochi to a nurse Monica Msosa (née Minofu) and a clinical officer, Noel Golden Grey Msosa. Her parents were both local civil servants working in Malawian district hospitals including Thyolo, Nsanje, Machinga, Mangochi amongst others. With her 6 younger sisters and one younger brother [dead].

She is from Malindi, Malawi, a village in Mangochi District on the southern shores of Lake Malawi.

Tembo attended St Mary's Secondary School, Zomba and later enrolled at Chancellor College of the University of Malawi. Tembo holds a masters degree from Leeds Beckett University in the United Kingdom in leadership and change management.

== Political career ==
Tembo began her political career when she ran for MP in the 2004 Malawian general election and won the Lilongwe City South West Constituency seat. During this term she also served as Publicity Secretary and National Spokesperson for then main opposition Malawi Congress Party. In the 2009 general election she failed to win a second term, losing to a ruling Democratic Progressive Party (DPP) party candidate.

In 2012 she was appointed a Commissioner for the Malawi Electoral Commission (MEC) and served until 2016. During the controversial 2014 general elections, she led an MEC Commissioner Revolt seeking electoral justice and demanding a recount before a winner was announced. The recount failed based on a legal technicality and former President Peter Mutharika was announced the winner.

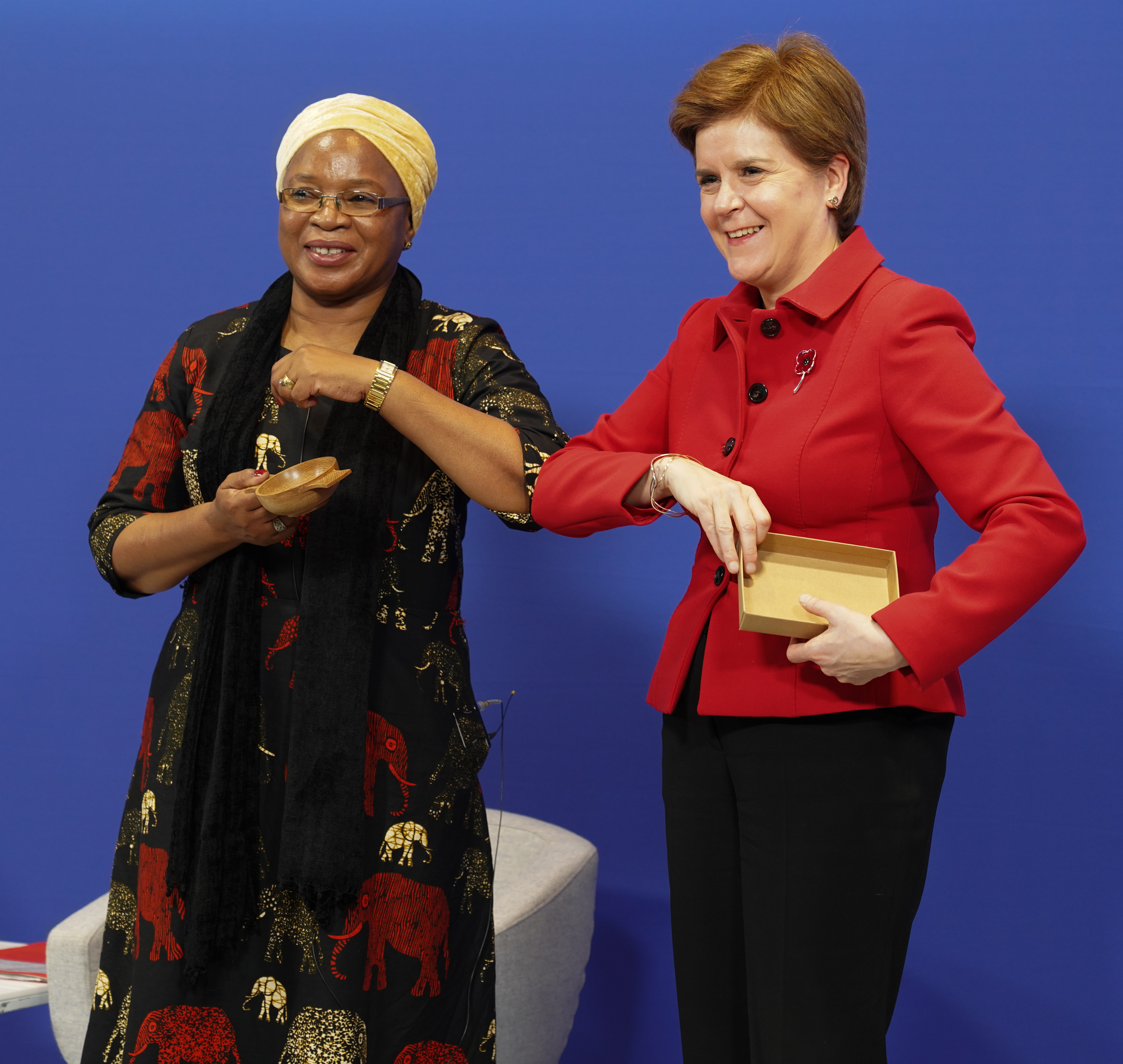
Tembo meeting Scotland's first Minister Nicola Sturgeon at COP26 in 2021

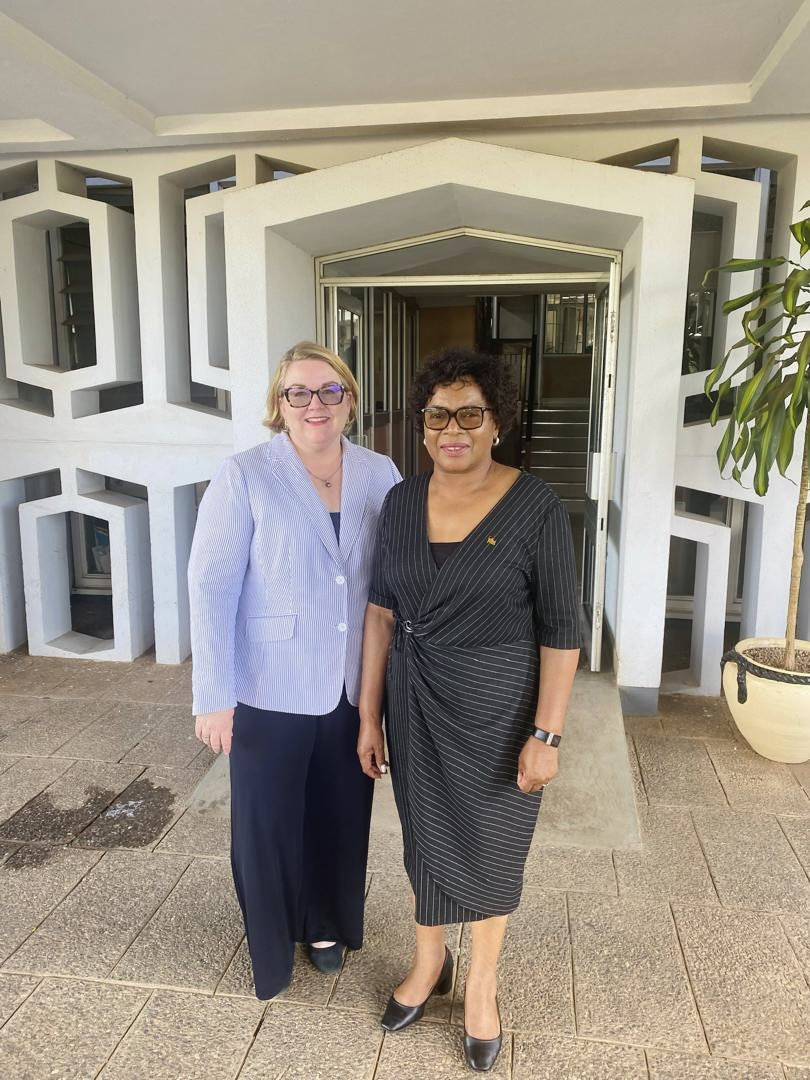
Nancy Tembo at the US Embassy in 2025

In 2018, she ran in the MCP primary elections in her former constituency. On the day of the primaries she was announced the winner. Later, media reports began announcing Chiphiko as the winner and the MCP also confirmed him as the primary election winner and the party candidate for the 2019 Malawi parliamentally elections. This dispute led to Hon. Tembo running on an independent ticket where she won with a landslide of 25,000+ votes. She beat her MCP rival, Chiphiko, who came in third position.

After her victory, she engaged herself in the fight for electoral justice seeking the nullification of the 2019 presidential elections. She joined colleagues in the Tonse Alliance grouping of nine political parties, led by Lazarus Chakwera. Their efforts led to the birth of the 3rd Republic and election of Chakwera as the sixth President of Malawi.

In 2019, whilst in parliament, Tembo exposed a dubious and unprocedural 'sale' of a public school land (Livimbo Primary School) in her constituency that was claimed by private commercial interests. Documents showed that the land belonged to the school. The business claiming ownership had constructed industrial warehouses in the school grounds. She took the Ministry of Lands officials to task demanding an explanation. The warehouses were eventually demolished by the state. The local constituency development committee then built a brick wall to secure the school's land from further invasion.

Tembo was appointed as Minister of Natural Resources and Climate Change in President Chakwera's inaugural cabinet and sworn in on 10 July 2020. Tembo has been an advocate for tree planting and environmental restoration in Malawi by partnering with the United Nations, IUCN, Cleaner Cooking Coalition, Rotary International, amongst many others. Her ambition is to replace charcoal burning (a leading cause of deforestation and environmental degradation in rural Malawi) with cleaner, more sustainable cooking methods for the majority of Malawians with an ultimate aim of achieving a clean and green Malawi again in our lifetime.

In August 2021, as Malawi became the chair of the Southern Africa Development Community (SADC), and she assumed the leadership of the SADC Cluster on Environment, Natural Resources, and Tourism. Later, as Minister of Foreign Affairs, she served as Chair of the SADC Council of Ministers.

In November 2021, she represented her native Malawi at the United Nations COP26 Climate Change Conference in Glasgow, Scotland after agreeing collaboration and support from the UK government.

Tembo was appointed Minister of Foreign Affairs of Malawi in January 2022. In 2023, Charles III became the head of the commonwealth. The British High Commissioner Fiona Ritchie organised a reception on 11 May at her official residence to mark the new King's coronation and she entertained Tembo as the Minister of Foreign Affairs. Tembo assured Ritchie of her country's support for Charles III.

In May 2024 Joyce Chitsulo's Public Appointments Committee (PAC) demanded that Tembo's Ministry of Foreigns Affairs should recall all of their staff working abroad who were principal officers who had not been vetted by the PAC. The request came after David Bisnowaty's appointment to be Malawi's charge d'affaires in Israel. PAC approved all senior appointments but it appears that this had been avoided by the Ministry of Foreigns Affairs. Chitsulo accused the ministry of appointing principal officers on a temporary basis to avoid scrutiny and they could in theory lead an embassy for four years without any oversight by PAC. Bisnowaty (an ex MP) and Tembo argued that the oversight was unnecessary and Bisnowaty was volunteering for the role. Chitsulo and civil society supporters found the argument that Bisnowaty was a volunteer when he was controlling the embassy's funds was dubious.

She was a candidate in the Lilongwe City Ngwenya Constituency in the 2025 elections. She narrowly beat Edward Mvoliwa, with them both having over 8,000 votes. There were four other candidates including Loveness Gondwe.

== Private life ==
Her husband, Morgan Tembo, is the Chief Executive Officer and co-founder of PayChangu. He previously served as the Chief Financial Officer (CFO) at Limbe Leaf Group, which is part of the Universal Corporation—a global agribusiness conglomerate. Together they have six children. Her husband's uncle was the veteran politician late John Tembo and hence is a cousin to de facto former first lady Cecilia Tamanda Kadzamira. Her aunt was Dr Elizabeth Sibale who was an agronomist who developed maize varieties.
