= List of foreign ministers in 1997 =

This is a list of foreign ministers in 1997.

== Africa ==
- Algeria - Ahmed Attaf (1996-1999)
- Angola - Venâncio da Silva Moura (1992-1999)
- Benin - Pierre Osho (1996-1998)
- Botswana - Mompati Merafhe (1994-2008)
- Burkina Faso - Ablassé Ouedraogo (1994-1999)
- Burundi - Luc Rukingama (1996-1998)
- Cameroon -
  1. Ferdinand Oyono (1992-1997)
  2. Augustin Kontchou Kouomegni (1997-2001)
- Cape Verde - Amílcar Spencer Lopes (1996-1998)
- Central African Republic -
  1. Michel Gbezera-Bria (1996-1997)
  2. Jean-Mette Yapende (1997-1999)
- Chad -
  1. Saleh Kebzabo (1996-1997)
  2. Mahamat Saleh Annadif (1997-2003)
- Comoros -
  1. Said Omar Said Ahmed (1996-1997)
  2. Mouhtar Ahmed Charif (1997)
  3. Ibrahim Ali Mzimba (1997-1998)
- Republic of the Congo -
  1. Arsène Tsaty Boungou (1995-1997)
  2. Rodolphe Adada (1997-2007)
- Democratic Republic of the Congo / Zaire -
  1. Gérard Kamanda Wa Kamanda (1996-1997)
  2. Bizima Karaha (1997-1998)
- Côte d'Ivoire - Amara Essy (1990-2000)
- Djibouti - Mohamed Moussa Chehem (1995-1999)
- Egypt - Amr Moussa (1991-2001)
- Equatorial Guinea - Miguel Oyono Ndong Mifumu (1993-1999)
- Eritrea -
  1. Petros Solomon (1994-1997)
  2. Haile Woldetensae (1997-2000)
- Ethiopia - Seyoum Mesfin (1991-2010)
- Gabon - Casimir Oyé-Mba (1994-1999)
- The Gambia -
  1. Baboucarr-Blaise Jagne (1995-1997)
  2. Omar Njie (1997-1998)
- Ghana -
  1. Obed Asamoah (1981-1997)
  2. Kwamena Ahwoi (1997)
  3. Victor Gbeho (1997-2001)
- Guinea - Lamine Camara (1996-1999)
- Guinea-Bissau - Fernando Delfim da Silva (1996-1999)
- Kenya - Kalonzo Musyoka (1993-1998)
- Lesotho - Kelebone Maope (1995-1998)
- Liberia - Monie Captan (1996-2003)
- Libya - Umar Mustafa al-Muntasir (1992-2000)
- Madagascar -
  1. Evariste Marson (1996-1997)
  2. Herizo Razafimahaleo (1997-1998)
- Malawi -
  1. George Ntafu (1996-1997)
  2. Mapopa Chipeta (1997-1999)
- Mali -
  1. Dioncounda Traoré (1994-1997)
  2. Modibo Sidibe (1997-2002)
- Mauritania -
  1. Lemrabott Sidi Mahmoud Ould Cheikh Ahmed (1996-1997)
  2. Ahmed Sidi Ould Khalifa (1997)
  3. Abdallahi Ould Nem (1997)
  4. Sow Abou Demha (1997)
  5. Mohamed El Hacen Ould Lebatt (1997-1998)
- Mauritius -
  1. Paul Bérenger (1995-1997)
  2. Navin Ramgoolam (1997)
  3. Rajkeswur Purryag (1997-2000)
- Morocco - Abdellatif Filali (1985-1999)
  - Western Sahara -
    1. Malainine Sadik (1995-1997)
    2. Bachir Mustafa Sayed (1997-1998)
- Mozambique - Leonardo Simão (1994-2005)
- Namibia - Theo-Ben Gurirab (1990-2002)
- Niger -
  1. Ibrahim Hassane Mayaki (1996-1997)
  2. Maman Sambo Sidikou (1997-1999)
- Nigeria - Tom Ikimi (1995-1998)
- Rwanda - Anastase Gasana (1994-1999)
- São Tomé and Príncipe - Homero Jeronimo Salvaterra (1996-1999)
- Senegal - Moustapha Niasse (1993-1998)
- Seychelles -
  1. Danielle de St. Jorre (1989-1997)
  2. France-Albert René (1997)
  3. Jérémie Bonnelame (1997-2005)
- Sierra Leone -
  1. Shirley Gbujama (1996-1997)
  2. Paolo Bangura (1997-1998)
- Somalia - no central government
  - Somaliland - Mahmud Salah Nur (1997-2001)
- South Africa - Alfred Baphethuxolo Nzo (1994-1999)
- Sudan - Ali Osman Taha (1995-1998)
- Swaziland - Arthur Khoza (1995-1998)
- Tanzania - Jakaya Kikwete (1995-2006)
- Togo - Koffi Panou (1996-1998)
- Tunisia -
  1. Habib Ben Yahia (1991-1997)
  2. Abderrahim Zouari (1997)
  3. Said Ben Mustapha (1997-1999)
- Uganda - Eriya Kategaya (1996-2001)
- Zambia -
  1. Lawrence Shimba (1996-1997)
  2. Keli Walubita (1997-2002)
- Zimbabwe - Stan Mudenge (1995-2005)

== Asia ==
- Afghanistan -
  1. Mohammad Ghous (1996-1997)
  2. Mullah Abdul Jalil (1997-1998)
- Armenia - Alexander Arzumanyan (1996-1998)
- Azerbaijan - Hasan Hasanov (1993-1998)
  - Nagorno-Karabakh -
    1. Arkadi Ghukasyan (1993-1997)
    2. Naira Melkumian (1997-2002)
- Bahrain - Sheikh Muhammad ibn Mubarak ibn Hamad Al Khalifah (1971-2005)
- Bangladesh - Abdus Samad Azad (1996-2001)
- Bhutan - Dawa Tsering (1972-1998)
- Brunei - Pengiran Muda Mohamed Bolkiah (1984–2015)
- Cambodia - Ung Huot (1994-1998)
- China - Qian Qichen (1988-1998)
- Georgia - Irakli Menagarishvili (1995-2003)
  - Abkhazia -
    1. Konstantin Ozgan (1996-1997)
    2. Sergei Shamba (1997-2004)
- India - I. K. Gujral (1996-1998)
- Indonesia - Ali Alatas (1988-1999)
- Iran -
  1. Ali Akbar Velayati (1981-1997)
  2. Kamal Kharazi (1997-2005)
- Iraq - Muhammad Saeed al-Sahhaf (1992-2001)
- Israel - David Levy (1996-1998)
- Japan -
  1. Yukihiko Ikeda (1996-1997)
  2. Keizō Obuchi (1997-1998)
- Jordan -
  1. Abdul Karim al-Kabariti (1995-1997)
  2. Fayez al-Tarawneh (1997-1998)
- Kazakhstan - Kassym-Jomart Tokayev (1994-1999)
- North Korea - Kim Yong-nam (1983-1998)
- South Korea - Yu Jong-ha (1996-1998)
- Kuwait - Sheikh Sabah Al-Ahmad Al-Jaber Al-Sabah (1978-2003)
- Kyrgyzstan -
  1. Roza Otunbayeva (1994-1997)
  2. Muratbek Imanaliyev (1997-2002)
- Laos - Somsavat Lengsavad (1993-2006)
- Lebanon - Farès Boueiz (1992-1998)
- Malaysia - Abdullah Ahmad Badawi (1991-1999)
- Maldives - Fathulla Jameel (1978-2005)
- Mongolia -
  1. Mendsaikhany Enkhsaikhan (1996-1997)
  2. Shukher Altangerel (1997-1998)
- Myanmar - Ohn Gyaw (1991-1998)
- Nepal -
  1. Prakash Chandra Lohani (1995-1997)
  2. Kamal Thapa (1997-1998)
- Oman - Yusuf bin Alawi bin Abdullah (1982–2020)
- Pakistan -
  1. Sahabzada Yaqub Khan (1996-1997)
  2. Gohar Ayub Khan (1997-1998)
- Philippines - Domingo Siazon, Jr. (1995-2001)
- Qatar - Sheikh Hamad bin Jassim bin Jaber Al Thani (1992-2013)
- Saudi Arabia - Prince Saud bin Faisal bin Abdulaziz Al Saud (1975–2015)
- Singapore - S. Jayakumar (1994-2004)
- Sri Lanka - Lakshman Kadirgamar (1994-2001)
- Syria - Farouk al-Sharaa (1984-2006)
- Taiwan -
  1. John Chiang (1996-1997)
  2. Jason Hu (1997-1999)
- Tajikistan - Talbak Nazarov (1994-2006)
- Thailand -
  1. Prachuab Chaiyasan (1996-1997)
  2. Surin Pitsuwan (1997-2001)
- Turkey -
  1. Tansu Çiller (1996-1997)
  2. İsmail Cem (1997-2002)
- Turkmenistan - Boris Şyhmyradow (1995-2000)
- United Arab Emirates - Rashid Abdullah Al Nuaimi (1980-2006)
- Uzbekistan - Abdulaziz Komilov (1994-2003)
- Vietnam - Nguyễn Mạnh Cầm (1991-2000)
- Yemen - Abd al-Karim al-Iryani (1994-1998)

== Australia and Oceania ==
- Australia - Alexander Downer (1996-2007)
- Fiji -
  1. Filipe Bole (1994-1997)
  2. Berenado Vunibobo (1997-1999)
- Kiribati - Teburoro Tito (1994-2003)
- Marshall Islands - Phillip H. Muller (1994-2000)
- Micronesia -
  1. Asterio R. Takesy (1996-1997)
  2. Epel K. Ilon (1997-2000)
- Nauru -
  1. Rueben Kun (1996-1997)
  2. Kinza Clodumar (1997-1998)
- New Zealand - Don McKinnon (1990-1999)
  - Cook Islands - Inatio Akaruru (1989-1999)
- Palau - Sabino Anastacio (1997-2000)
- Papua New Guinea -
  1. Kilroy Genia (1996-1997)
  2. Chris Haiveta (1997)
  3. Roy Yaki (1997-1999)
- Solomon Islands -
  1. David Sitai (1996-1997)
  2. Patterson Oti (1997-2000)
- Tonga - Prince Tupouto'a Tungi (1979-1998)
- Tuvalu - Bikenibeu Paeniu (1996-1999)
- Vanuatu -
  1. Willie Jimmy (1996-1997)
  2. Amos Andeng (1997)
  3. Vital Soksok (1997-1998)
- Western Samoa - Tofilau Eti Alesana (1988-1998)

== Europe ==
- Albania -
  1. Tritan Shehu (1996-1997)
  2. Arjan Starova (1997)
  3. Paskal Milo (1997-2001)
- Andorra -
  1. Manuel Mas Ribó (1994-1997)
  2. Albert Pintat (1997-2001)
- Austria - Wolfgang Schüssel (1995-2000)
- Belarus -
  1. Uladzimir Syanko (1994-1997)
  2. Ivan Antanovich (1997-1998)
- Belgium - Erik Derycke (1995-1999)
  - Brussels-Capital Region - Jos Chabert (1989-1999)
  - Flanders - Luc Van den Brande (1992-1999)
  - Wallonia - William Ancion (1996-1999)
- Bosnia and Herzegovina - Jadranko Prlić (1996-2001)
  - Republika Srpska - Aleksa Buha (1992-1998)
- Bulgaria -
  1. Irina Bokova (acting) (1996-1997)
  2. Stoyan Stalev (1997)
  3. Nadezhda Mihailova (1997-2001)
- Croatia - Mate Granić (1993-2000)
- Cyprus -
  1. Alekos Michaelides (1993-1997)
  2. Ioannis Kasoulidis (1997-2003)
  - Northern Cyprus - Taner Etkin (1996-1998)
- Czech Republic -
  1. Josef Zieleniec (1992-1997)
  2. Jaroslav Šedivý (1997-1998)
- Denmark - Niels Helveg Petersen (1993-2000)
- Estonia - Toomas Hendrik Ilves (1996-1998)
- Finland - Tarja Halonen (1995-2000)
- France -
  1. Hervé de Charette (1995-1997)
  2. Hubert Védrine (1997-2002)
- Germany - Klaus Kinkel (1992-1998)
- Greece - Theodoros Pangalos (1996-1999)
- Hungary - László Kovács (1994-1998)
- Iceland - Halldór Ásgrímsson (1995-2004)
- Ireland -
  1. Dick Spring (1994-1997)
  2. Ray Burke (1997)
  3. David Andrews (1997-2000)
- Italy - Lamberto Dini (1996-2001)
- Latvia - Valdis Birkavs (1994-1999)
- Liechtenstein - Andrea Willi (1993-2001)
- Lithuania - Algirdas Saudargas (1996-2000)
- Luxembourg - Jacques Poos (1984-1999)
- Republic of Macedonia -
  1. Ljubomir Frckovski (1996-1997)
  2. Blagoje Handžiski (1997-1998)
- Malta - George Vella (1996-1998)
- Moldova -
  1. Mihai Popov (1994-1997)
  2. Nicolae Tăbăcaru (1997-2000)
- Netherlands - Hans van Mierlo (1994-1998)
- Norway -
  1. Bjørn Tore Godal (1994-1997)
  2. Knut Vollebæk (1997-2000)
- Poland -
  1. Dariusz Rosati (1995-1997)
  2. Bronisław Geremek (1997-2000)
- Portugal - Jaime Gama (1995-2002)
- Romania -
  1. Adrian Severin (1996-1997)
  2. Andrei Pleşu (1997-1999)
- Russia - Yevgeny Primakov (1996-1998)
  - Chechnya -
    1. Ruslan Chimayev (1996-1997)
    2. Movladi Udugo (1997-1998)
- San Marino - Gabriele Gatti (1986-2002)
- Slovakia -
  1. Pavol Hamžík (1996-1997)
  2. Zdenka Kramplová (1997-1998)
- Slovenia -
  1. Davorin Kračun (1996-1997)
  2. Zoran Thaler (1997)
  3. Boris Frlec (1997-2000)
- Spain - Abel Matutes (1996-2000)
- Sweden - Lena Hjelm-Wallén (1994-1998)
- Switzerland - Flavio Cotti (1993-1999)
- Ukraine - Hennadiy Udovenko (1994-1998)
- United Kingdom -
  1. Malcolm Rifkind (1995-1997)
  2. Robin Cook (1997-2001)
- Vatican City - Archbishop Jean-Louis Tauran (1990-2003)
- Yugoslavia - Milan Milutinović (1995-1998)
  - Montenegro -
    1. Janko Jeknić (1995-1997)
    2. Branko Perović (1997-2000)

== North America and the Caribbean ==
- Antigua and Barbuda - Lester Bird (1991-2004)
- The Bahamas - Janet Bostwick (1994-2002)
- Barbados - Billie Miller (1994-2008)
- Belize - Dean Barrow (1993-1998)
- Canada - Lloyd Axworthy (1996-2000)
  - Quebec - Sylvain Simard (1996-1998)
- Costa Rica - Fernando Naranjo Villalobos (1994-1998)
- Cuba - Roberto Robaina (1993-1999)
- Dominica - Edison James (1995-1998)
- Dominican Republic - Eduardo Latorre Rodríguez (1996-2000)
- El Salvador - Ramón Ernesto González Giner (1995-1999)
- Grenada -
  1. Keith Mitchell (1995-1997)
  2. Raphael Fletcher (1997-1998)
- Guatemala - Eduardo Stein (1996-2000)
- Haiti - Fritz Longchamp (1995-2001)
- Honduras - Delmer Urbizo Panting (1995-1998)
- Jamaica - Seymour Mullings (1995-2000)
- Mexico - José Ángel Gurría (1994-1998)
- Nicaragua -
  1. Ernesto Leal (1992-1997)
  2. Emilio Álvarez Montalván (1997-1998)
- Panama - Ricardo Alberto Arias (1996-1998)
- Puerto Rico – Norma Burgos (1995–1999)
- Saint Kitts and Nevis - Denzil Douglas (1995-2000)
- Saint Lucia -
  1. Vaughan Lewis (1996-1997)
  2. George Odlum (1997-2001)
- Saint Vincent and the Grenadines - Alpian Allen (1994-1998)
- Trinidad and Tobago - Ralph Maraj (1995-2000)
- United States -
  1. Warren Christopher (1993-1997)
  2. Madeleine Albright (1997-2001)

== South America ==
- Argentina - Guido di Tella (1991-1999)
- Bolivia -
  1. Antonio Araníbar Quiroga (1993-1997)
  2. Javier Murillo de la Rocha (1997-2001)
- Brazil - Luiz Felipe Palmeira Lampreia (1995-2001)
- Chile - José Miguel Insulza (1994-1999)
- Colombia - María Emma Mejía Vélez (1996-1998)
- Ecuador -
  1. Galo Leoro Franco (1994-1997)
  2. José Ayala Lasso (1997-1999)
- Guyana - Clement Rohee (1992-2001)
- Paraguay - Rubén Melgarejo Lanzoni (1996-1998)
- Peru -
  1. Francisco Tudela (1995-1997)
  2. Eduardo Ferrero Costa (1997-1998)
- Suriname -
  1. Faried Pierkhan (1996-1997)
  2. Errol Snijders (1997-2000)
- Uruguay - Álvaro Ramos Trigo (1995-1998)
- Venezuela - Miguel Ángel Burelli Rivas (1994-1999)
