= Georgi Pirinski Jr. =

Bulgarian politician

Georgi Pirinski
- Георги Пирински
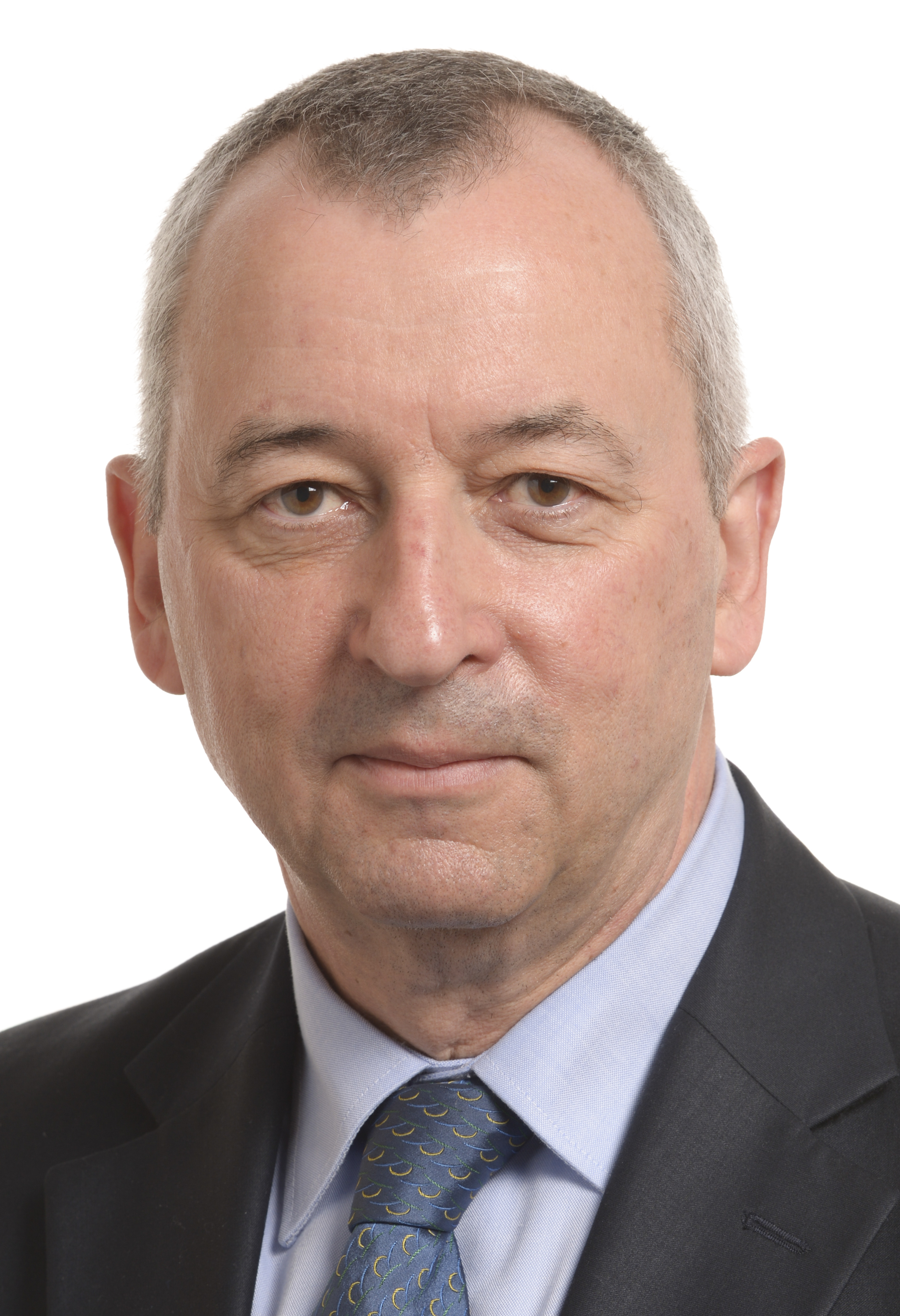

Member of the European Parliament
- In office 2014–2019

Personal details
- Born: Georgi Georgiev Pirinski; 10 September 1948 (age 77) New York City, United States
- Party: Bulgarian Communist Party (before 1989); Bulgarian Socialist Party (after 1990–present)
- Profession: Economist, Politician

Georgi Georgiev Pirinski Jr. (Bulgarian: Георги Георгиев Пирински; born 10 September 1948) is a Bulgarian politician of the Bulgarian Communist Party and after 1990 of the Bulgarian Socialist Party (BSP). He was a member of seven National Parliaments (1990 – 2013) and was the Chairman of the National Assembly of Bulgaria from 2005 to 2009. Member of the European Parliament between 2014 and 2019.

== Biography ==
Born in New York City, U.S. in the emigrant family of Communist functionary Georgi Pirinski Sr., he has roots from Pirin Macedonia. His mother Pauline was born in New York City and was a member of the Young Communist League at the City College of New York. She was a professor of English at Sofia University. His father found refuge in the U.S. after he participated in the unsuccessful Communist uprising against the Bulgarian ruling monarchy in 1923 and was expelled from the U.S. as an undesirable alien in 1951. While a convinced communist, Pirinski did show some flashes of independent thinking, such as expressing disagreement in a private conversation with foreign visitors in 1970 at the decision of Bulgarian media to downplay the U.S. moonwalk the previous year. In the late 1970s, Pirinski was an aide to then Deputy Prime Minister Andrey Lukanov and then at the age of 31 became Bulgaria's youngest deputy minister (of foreign trade). He renounced his U.S. citizenship in 1974, but political opponents later argued that the renunciation was judicially null. Pirinski was considered the BSP's favorite for the 1996 presidential nomination until the Constitutional Court barred him from participating in the presidential elections for failing to satisfy a constitutional requirement that the president be a Bulgarian citizen by birth (he was a U.S. citizen by birth).

A vice-premier during the Georgi Atanasov and Andrey Lukanov governments and a foreign minister during the Zhan Videnov government, Pirinski was the Chairman of the National Assembly of Bulgaria from 11 July 2005 to 25 June 2009.

== See also ==
- List of foreign ministers in 1997
- Foreign relations of Bulgaria
- List of Bulgarians

Political offices
Preceded by Ivan Stanchov	Foreign Minister of Bulgaria; 26 January 1995 – 12 February 1997	Succeeded by Stoyan Stalev
