= Judiciary of Malawi =

The Judiciary of Malawi is the branch of the Government of Malawi which interprets and applies the laws of Malawi to ensure equal justice under law and to provide a mechanism for dispute resolution. The legal system of Malawi is based on English law, modified since 1969. The Constitution defines the judiciary as a hierarchical system of courts, with the highest court being a Supreme Court of Appeal, together with a High Court and a number of magistrates' courts. Malawian judiciary has frequently demonstrated its independence in recent years. The Constitutional Court of Malawi nullified the 2019 election results, citing widespread irregularities. The Supreme Court upheld the verdict of the Constitutional Court. Five Constitutional Court judges who overturned the results of the 2019 election won the 2020 Chatham House Prize.

== Supreme Court of Appeal ==
The Supreme Court of Appeal has jurisdiction only in appeals from the High Court or other lower courts or tribunals as indicated by an Act of Parliament. It is composed of the Chief Justice and Justices of Appeal. A sitting of the Supreme Court was presided by 3 Justices of Appeal which would at times include the Chief Justice except in Constitutional matters where five Justices of Appeal had to preside. From 2018, the Chief Justice issued a Practice Direction requiring the Chief Justice or such other senior Justice of Appeal to sit with at least 6 other Justices of Appeal on all matters.

== High Court ==
High court - civil division, Lilongwe

The High Court of Malawi has unlimited original jurisdiction to hear and determine any civil or criminal proceedings. It has a General Division which may also hear appeals from subordinate courts, and a Commercial Division, dealing with commercial or business cases. Most High Court cases are heard before a single judge, without a jury, but cases on constitutional matters must be heard by three judges.

== Subordinate courts ==
One subordinate court is the Industrial Relations Court with jurisdiction over employment issues. Cases before it are heard informally, and with some restrictions on legal representation, by a panel consisting of a chairperson and one representative each of employers and employees. Other subordinate courts are the magistrates' courts and local or traditional courts. These have defined criminal and civil jurisdiction depending on their level, but expressly excluding cases of treason, murder or manslaughter.

== History ==
During colonial rule, the hierarchy of courts began with magistrates' courts in the towns, rising to a High Court and finally a Supreme Court of Appeal. In addition, mainly in rural areas, there were several levels of local courts with varying powers to hear disputes such as divorces and other matrimonial issues, inheritance and access to land based on traditional customary law. These courts also heard minor criminal cases specified in the Malawi Penal Code, using an expedited procedure. These were subordinate to the High Court, and subject to legislation giving the guarantee of a fair trial, including the right to legal representation and the right to appeal to the High Court.

After independence in 1964, Prime Minister Hastings Banda, and Minister of Justice Orton Chirwa began to criticise such principles of English-based law as the presumption of innocence, the need to establish guilt beyond reasonable doubt and the requirement for corroborating evidence. In 1969, the acquittal of five defendants in the first Chilobwe murders trial caused outrage. The parliamentary reaction was hostile, and several speakers, including ministers, openly suggested that European judges and the European-style legal system had allowed clearly guilty defendants to escape punishment, although another individual was later found guilty of all the murders in a second trial. Aleke Banda, the Minister of Finance, particularly attacked the use of defence lawyers and the legal safeguards imposed by the English-law rules of evidence. Banda (who was president from 1966) suggested that the judge should resign and specifically linked traditional law to making punishment certain, claiming that lack of evidence was not proof of innocence.

From 1970, the system of traditional courts was transformed. Three regional traditional courts and a National Traditional Court of Appeal were created above the existing network of lower-level traditional courts, and given jurisdiction over virtually all criminal trials, including murder and treason, involving Africans of Malawian descent, using "customary" rules of evidence and procedure. Appeals were directed to a National Traditional Court of Appeal rather than the Malawi High Court, as had been the case before 1970. The High Court and Supreme Court of Appeal remained in existence, and mainly dealt with civil law cases outside customary law. Although these courts retained their criminal jurisdiction, in practice the vast majority of criminal cases were heard in the traditional courts. The traditional courts were supposed to operate in accordance with African law and custom, although they applied an authoritarian, restrictive and punitive version of customary law, in line with the views of Banda. The majority of the judges were chiefs without legal training, appointed by and liable to dismissal by Banda, without any judicial independence. Defendants were not allowed lawyers to plead their cases and had no automatic rights either to call witnesses or to appeal (these were at the discretion of the courts and the Minister of Justice). They were not given a summary of the charges against them before the trial, so they could not prepare a defence.

The traditional courts gained a reputation for corruption and for prosecuting Banda's political opponents, for example the high-profile trials in 1976 of Albert Muwalo, Secretary General of the Malawi Congress Party and Focus Gwede, Head of the Police Special Branch, charged with attempting to assassinate Banda, and the 1983 treason trial of Orton Chirwa, who was Minister of Justice until the Cabinet Crisis of 1964 and his wife, Vera Chirwa. In both cases, unsubstantiated evidence was admitted to secure convictions and all four were sentenced to death on flimsy evidence, although ultimately only Muwalo was executed.

In October 1993 the three regional traditional courts and the National Traditional Appeal Court were suspended indefinitely. A new Constitution came into force on 18 May 1994, with recognition of customary law as an integral part of the legal system, and the conversion of many lower traditional courts into magistrates' courts. It also provided for a new system of Traditional Courts but legislation for this was not introduced until 2011. The 2011 legislation provided for two levels of customary law courts: several Local Courts were established in each of Malawi's 27 districts, mainly in rural areas, and one District Appeals Local Court in each district (to hear appeals from the Local Courts). Further appeals may be made to the High Court, to which both types of Local Courts are subordinate. Each Local Court and District Appeals Local Court was headed by a chairperson, who need not be a lawyer, but with a reasonable standard of education, proficiency in English and an adequate knowledge of the customary law and language of the area that the court serves.

== List of chief justices ==
- 1964–? Sir Frederick Southworth
- 1969-1970: Sir Philip Pike
- 1970–1985: James John Skinner
- 1985-1992: Friday Lewis Makuta SC (First Malawian to hold office of Chief Justice)
- 1992–2002: Richard Banda (later Chief Justice of Swaziland, 2007)
- 2003–2007: Leonard E. Unyolo
- 2007-2013: Lovemore Munlo
- 2013–2015: Anastasia Msosa
- 2015–2021 Andrew K.C. Nyirenda
- 2021- Rizine Mzikamanda

== See also ==
- Traditional Courts in Malawi
- Politics of Malawi
