= Minister of Foreign Affairs (Malawi) =

Minister of Foreign Affairs of Malawi

Minister of Foreign Affairs of the Republic of Malawi is a cabinet minister in charge of the Ministry of Foreign Affairs of Malawi, responsible for conducting foreign relations of the country.

The following is a list of foreign ministers of Malawi since its founding in 1964:

No.	Name (Birth–Death)	Portrait	Tenure
1	Kanyama Chiume (1929–2007)		1964
2	Hastings Banda (1898–1997)		1964–1993
3	Hetherwick Ntaba (b. 1943)		1993–1994
4	Edward Bwanali (1946–1998)		1994–1996
5	George Ntafu (1942–2015)		1996–1997
6	Mapopa Chipeta		1997–1999
7	Brown Mpinganjira (b. 1950)		1999–2000
8	Lilian Patel (b. 1951)		2000–2004
9	George Chaponda (b. 1942)		2004–2005
10	Davis Katsonga (b. 1955)		2005–2006
11	Joyce Banda (b. 1950)		2006–2009
12	Etta Banda (b. 1949)		2009–2011
13	Bingu wa Mutharika (1934–2012)		2011
14	Peter Mutharika (b. 1940)		2011–2012
15	Ephraim Chiume (b. 1953)		2012–2014
(9)	George Chaponda (b. 1942)		2014–2016
16	Francis Kasaila (b. 1968)		2016–2017
17	Emmanuel Fabiano		2017–2019
18	Francis Kasaila		2019–2020
19	Eisenhower Nduwa Mkaka		2020–2022
20	Nancy Tembo		2022–2025
21	George Chaponda (b. 1942)		2025-
