= Hetherwick Ntaba =

Malawian doctor and politician

Dr. Hetherwick Ntaba is a Malawian medical doctor and politician, and former Publicity Secretary of the Democratic Progressive Party (DPP). Ntaba was Minister of Foreign Affairs from 1993 to 1994. Later, he was Secretary-General of the DPP.

In 2020 there were calls for him to resign his positions. One of the suspects accused of killing an albino man had alleged that he and over a dozen others had killed the man under orders from Ntaba, Ntaba refused, noting that this was a baseless accusation with no supporting evidence.

Preceded by Hastings Kamuzu Banda	Foreign Minister of Malawi; 1993–1994	Succeeded by Edward Bwanali
