= Jumani Johansson =

Malawian-Swedish man (1973–2019)

Jim Jumani Johansson (legally Jim Jumani Immanuel Masauko Kamuzu Banda) (2 May 1973 – 26 January 2019) was a Malawian-Swedish man and allegedly the illegitimate son of the late Malawian President Hastings Kamuzu Banda (1898–1997). He changed his name to Jim Jumani Immanuel Masauko Kamuzu Banda. Johansson says that it was after Banda died in 1997 that 'some government officials' told him about who his father really was. Officially, Banda died childless and unmarried. His claim and resemblance to the former dictator opened up many unanswered questions about the legacy of Banda. Johansson became a celebrity overnight in Malawi owing to his uncanny resemblance to the former president and his measures to seek legal means of proving his identity. Malawians were divided on whether he was the true heir but the public demanded a right to know as well. Focus Gwede, the head of Banda's Special Branch of Secret Police Services, came out in support of Johansson, claiming in 2010 that Banda had fathered three children.

== Paternity claims ==
=== Muhammad Jogee ===
Johansson's adoptive mother, Miriam Kaunda, claims that Jumani's father is Muhammad Jogee, an Indian-Malawian living outside of Malawi. Jogee, or proof of his existence, however, cannot be located. Banda's family also claim that Jogee is the real father.

=== Kamuzu Banda ===
Johansson went to the cabinet to have his name changed officially to Jim Jumani Immanuel Masauko Kamuzu Banda and this was legally granted by the courts, who stated that he had the right to call himself any name he wanted in spite of attempts to block this move by the Banda family.

==== Preliminary DNA testing ====
Kamuzu's DNA was secretly taken from the College of Medicine for the purpose of preliminary tests with the help of an unnamed Malawian doctor. Preliminary DNA tests conducted in a private lab in South Africa show that Jim Jumani Johansson was the biological son of Kamuzu Banda. Jumani was still seeking official DNA testing with permission of the Banda estate to prove or disprove his paternity, up until his death.

== Maternity claims ==
Banda was known to be in one relationship that resulted in an heir, with a married British woman, but there is other evidence of affairs which have mainly been kept confidential.

=== Cecilia Kadzamira ===
The official hostess was Cecilia Kadzamira, but it is believed it was not a sexual relationship by Malawian historians like John Lwanda. According to Lwanda, Kadzamira cannot be the mother.

=== Merene French ===
There is also the relationship with a married British confidant, Merene French, with whom Banda had an affair.

=== Miriam Kaunda ===
Miriam Kaunda raised Johansson, but Jumani insisted that she was not his mother, notably due to her refusal to take a DNA test for maternity. Kaunda continues to insist that Banda was not Johannson's father.

== Court case ==
Although Johansson was seeking a high court to order DNA testing, Banda's family denied the use of DNA samples to prove or disprove the claim. Banda's family was skeptical about his claims because of the property claims that his heritage would mean. A grand-niece of Dr. Banda, Jane Dzanjalimodzi, noted that “many people will come out of the woodwork to make claims because they know Banda’s vast estate is about to be distributed”. In tense court battles, they have attempted to block Johansson from legally changing his name to Kamuzu Banda, and from visiting the family estates. The family also claims that Johansson was a Swede and not a Malawian citizen and could not make any claims in Malawian courts without paying court costs. Jumani, however, wanted court-supervised DNA testing where both himself and family representatives were present. Lawyers from the Centre for Human Rights and Rehabilitation (CHRR) were hired to assist the late Jumani in his claims.

== Presidential threats and arrest ==
Johansson was arrested for asking a presidential guard (at the private residence of the president, Kamazu Palace) why he was protecting a ‘stupid’ president (Bingu wa Mutharika) who ‘killed people’ and for then adding that he could ‘kill Mutharika’ himself which was seen as a threat against the president. He was defended by Zeros Matumba in first grade magistrate Richard Gomani's court. He was granted bail against the wishes of the police, and his hearing was adjourned until September 21, 2011.

== Deportation from Malawi ==
On September 27, 2011, immigration authorities took Johansson in for overstaying his allotted time in the country and started processing his deportation. According to The Nation which broke the Jumani story, he acquired a Swedish passport after his adoption by his step-father, Matt Johansson. Johansson was deported on September 28, 2011, for overstaying his visit in Malawi. He had a Malawian passport and had applied for reinstatement of his Malawian citizenship His lawyer, Zeros Matumba, had been trying to fight his deportation.

== Death ==
On January 26, 2019, it was reported that Jumani had died. There is considerable suspicion as to the cause of his death. He was 45.
