= Edward Bwanali =

Foreign minister of Malawi

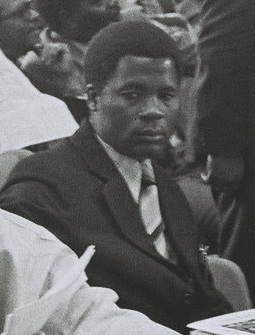
- Born: 23 April 1946
- Died: 1988 (aged 41–42)
- Occupation: politician

Edward Bwanali was a Malawian politician. Bwanali was foreign minister of his country from 1994 to 1996. Bwanali died in 1998.

He was the minister of finance from 1978 to 1980, and from 1984 to 1986.

Preceded by Hetherwick Ntaba	Foreign Minister of Malawi; 1994–1996	Succeeded by George Ntafu
