= Etta Banda =

Malawian politician

Minister of Foreign Affairs of Malawi
- In office 17 June 2009 – 19 August 2011
- President: Bingu wa Mutharika
- Preceded by: Joyce Banda
- Succeeded by: Peter Mutharika

Personal details
- Born: 1949 (age 76–77) Malawi

Eta Elizabeth Banda (born 1949) is a former Malawian politician who was the country's Minister of Foreign Affairs from 2009 to 2011. Prior to entering politics, she worked as a health professional and university administrator.

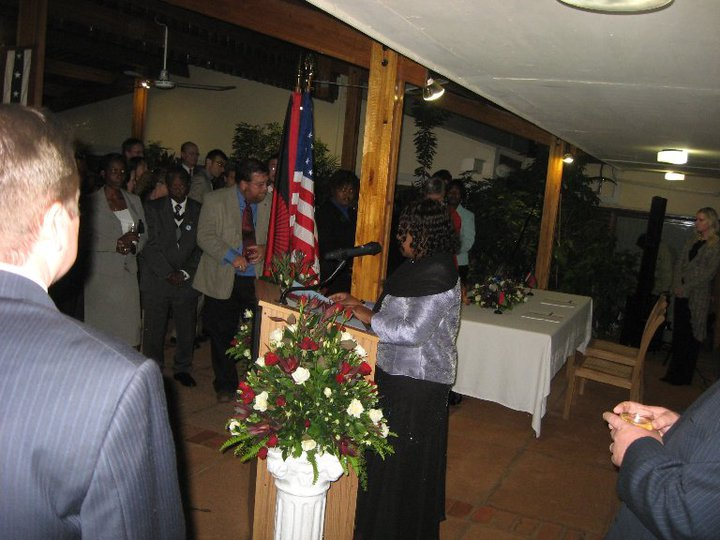
Banda giving a speech at the U.S. Embassy (2010)

== Early life ==
Banda studied at Malawi's college of nursing and then worked in that profession for some time. She subsequently pursued further study, initially in South Africa and then in the United States, where she graduated with a Master of Science (M.Sc.) degree in community health nursing from Boston University. She later went on to complete a doctorate at the University of Maryland, in the fields of nursing administration, education, and policy. On her return to Malawi, Banda became a member of the faculty of the Kamuzu College of Nursing in Lilongwe, which is part of the University of Malawi. Her research focused on health policy planning in Malawi and the wider Southern Africa region, and she served on the editorial board of the African Journal of Midwifery. She was eventually appointed dean of the college, and later served as vice-principal and principal.

== Politics ==
Banda was elected to the National Assembly of Malawi at the 2009 general election, standing for the Democratic Progressive Party (DPP) in the Nkhata Bay South constituency. When President Bingu wa Mutharika formed his new cabinet in June 2009, she was made Minister of Foreign Affairs. She became the third woman to hold the position, after Lilian Patel and Joyce Banda. In April 2011, Banda had Fergus Cochrane-Dyet, the High Commissioner of the United Kingdom to Malawi, expelled from the country, after a diplomatic telegram was leaked in which he criticised President wa Mutharika. Her decision to do so was made with the president's knowledge, but he gave her his retrospective approval when she made remarks to the effect that she would rather resign as foreign minister than see her president insulted with impunity. In August 2011, however, President wa Mutharika decided to sack his entire cabinet. When it was reconstituted the following month on 7 September 2011, Banda was omitted. Since December 2012 Banda has lived overseas in the UK where she holds a senior role with an educational charity.

== See also ==
- List of female foreign ministers

Political offices
Preceded by Joyce Banda	Foreign Minister of Malawi; 2009–2011	Succeeded by Peter Mutharika
