= Davis Katsonga =

Malawian diplomat and politician

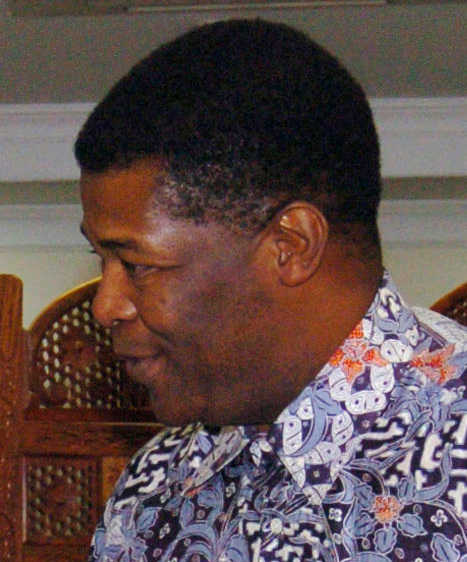
Katsonga in 2006

Davis Chester Katsonga (born 6 August 1955) is a Malawian politician. He gained the position of defence minister on 1 June 2006 during a cabinet reshuffle. He was the foreign minister from early in 2005 until June 2006. Previously he was the minister of natural resources from June 2004 until early 2005, and before that he was the parliament speaker. He was a member of the Malawian parliament, elected as part of the United Democratic Front from 2004 to 2009.

In May 2007, President Bingu wa Mutharika removed him from his post in the Defence Ministry under pressure from the Malawi Defence Force officers who demanded his removal

Preceded by George Ntafu	Minister of Natural Resources of Malawi; 2004-2005	Succeeded by ?
Preceded by George Ntafu	Foreign Minister of Malawi; 2005-2006	Succeeded by Joyce Banda
Preceded by George Ntafu	Defence Minister of Malawi; 2006-2007	Succeeded by ?
