= Capital Radio Malawi =

Radio company in Malawi

Coordinates: 13.9566°S 33.7539°E

Capital Radio Malawi is a radio station in Malawi that was launched on 29 March 1999 by journalist Alaudin Osman. The station broadcasts across all three regions of Malawi, and covers the urban centers of Blantyre, Zomba, Lilongwe, Dedza Mangochi and Mzuzu. Programming follows an Adult Contemporary format, including various musical genres, news, information and entertainment. The bulk of content is news, business, music and entertainment programming.

Its mission is to inform, entertain and uplift the people of Malawi by providing reliable news and quality programmes.

In May 2004, the director of Capital Radio told the Agence France-Presse news agency that four of its reporters had been arrested for broadcasting an "inflammatory interview" with opposition spokesperson Kholiwe Mkandawire. On 20 September 2005, Capital Radio Malawi challenged the Protected Emblems and Names Act of 1967, which limits media freedom in Malawi. On 14 September 2005, police arrested opposition leader Gwanda Chakuamba for violating this law at a political rally where he allegedly insulted President Bingu wa Mutharika. Capital Radio had broadcast his speech live. Al Osman asked his lawyers to lodge an appeal with the High Court asking it to declare the legislation unconstitutional. On 22 February 2009, Capital Radio broadcast an interview with Bakili Muluzi, who accused the government of using intimidation against his presidential candidacy and warned that such conduct could lead to "problems".

Of late, Capital Radio has been interviewing political party leaders and cabinet ministers under the Lazarus Chakwera administration. Many have been taken to task over how they are failing to fulfill the promises the Tones Alliance made to Malawians before coming into power.

== Straight Talk ==
Capital Radio's Straight Talk is a popular program where movers and shakers in society can air their views. In April 2010, their program included an interview with Deputy Minister in the Office of President and Cabinet, Nicholas Dausi. Dausi talked at length, but despite close questioning was evasive about his role in the government. Speaking in January 2011 on Straight Talk, George Chaponda, Minister for Justice and Constitutional Affairs, said the Air Fouling legislation in the proposed Local Courts bill banned farting in public places. After the story made headlines in the world press, he was forced to retract this statement. In February 2011, Alaudin Osman, who is also the Executive member of the Media Council of Malawi and Chairman of NICO, signed an agreement with the government in which the media committed to refrain from reporting stories that would destroy the image and credibility of the country.
