= Elvey Mtafu =

Evelyn Mtafu
- in 1997
- Occupation: Electoral commissioner
- Spouse: George Ntafu

Elvey Kalonga Mtafu is a Malawian who became a member of Malawi's Electoral Commission.

== Life ==
She married George Ntafu.

She was chosen to be an electoral commissioner.

The commission organised training sessions for staff to oversee elections in 2015. Mtafu emphasised that respect and rules were important and the commission would fire anyone guilty of malpractice.

Following rumours of malpractice by other commissioners she was the only commissioner reappointed in 2016.

In February 2020 a constitutional court conducted an enquiry following reports of a flawed 21 May Presidential election. Mtafu was called to give evidence and she was told that her initial answers to their questions were insufficient. She was asked to return and be better prepared. Mtafa said that officials were arrested for using Tippex, but another commissioner, Yahama Mmadi, contradicted her the next day. The court annulled the "Tippex" election and demanded a new one.

== Private life ==
Her husband was a politician and surgeon. He was arrested without charge and released without charge in 1991. He went on to help found a party and he became an MP and minister. He died in a car accident in 2015. She arranged to have her husbands partially complete auto-biography to be published in 2021.
