= Daliso Chaponda =

Malawian stand-up comedian (born 1979)

- Born: 29 November 1979 (age 46); Lusaka, Zambia
- Education: McGill University; Concordia University (BA)
- Parent: George Chaponda

Comedy career
- Years active: 2001–present
- Website: dalisochaponda.com

Daliso Chaponda (born 29 November 1979) is a Zambian-born Malawian stand-up comedian currently residing in the United Kingdom. In 2017, he became a finalist in the variety show Britain's Got Talent in 2017, finishing third overall. In 2018, he launched a BBC Radio 4 series Daliso Chaponda: Citizen of Nowhere.

== Early life ==
Chaponda was born in Zambia in 1979 and spent several years moving between various African countries before going to Malawi at the age of 11. His parents were from Malawi, but had fled the country due to the dictatorship of Hastings Banda. His father George Chaponda worked as a lawyer for the United Nations High Commissioner for Refugees, so the family lived in various countries, including Thailand, Australia and Switzerland. His family later returned to Malawi, and George Chaponda was eventually appointed the Minister of Foreign Affairs and Minister of Education by Bingu wa Mutharika.

Daliso Chaponda attended Waterford Kamhlaba United World College of Southern Africa, and went on to further education at McGill University, followed by Concordia University in Canada, where he initially studied computer programming before switching to English literature.

== Career ==
Chaponda began his comedy career in 2001 while he was in Canada. To hone his craft, he focused on stand-up clubs and open mic nights. His first headlining show, Feed This Black Man, was at Concordia University in 2002. In 2006, he moved to the United Kingdom where he opened for other comedians such as John Bishop. During that time, he appeared in venues in the United Kingdom, South Africa and Australia.

In 2008, he appeared in the Edinburgh Festival Fringe's "Best of the Fest". In 2009, he performed for the first time in Malawi. The same year, he also opened for Canadian comedian Sugar Sammy in Dubai and Jordan. In 2012, Chaponda made a joke about the Malawian flag during one of his "Laughrica" shows in Malawi. The government subsequently threatened to arrest him for insulting the flag. In 2014, he co-wrote a BBC Radio 4 drama-comedy series inspired by the incident, Sibusiso Mamba's When the Laughter Stops.

In 2017, Chaponda auditioned for the television talent series Britain's Got Talent. Judge Amanda Holden used her "golden buzzer" to help him advance to the semi-finals. Chaponda eventually came third in the competition.

As a result of his appearance on Britain's Got Talent, Chaponda signed with BBC Radio 4 to create a new series called Daliso Chaponda: Citizen of Nowhere, begun in 2018, totalling by 2021 twelve half-hour episodes, rebroadcast on BBC Radio 4 Extra in 2022. He began his first headlining world tour What the African Said... in February 2018.

Chaponda has appeared in six episodes of QI.

In November 2023, Chaponda appeared as a Dictionary Corner guest on the television game show Countdown.

In January 2025, he appeared on, and won, an episode of Celebrity Mastermind.

In April 2025, Chaponda trekked Switzerland in the BBC Two series Pilgrimage, The Road through the Alps.

== Influences ==
Chaponda has said in interviews that he admires many standup comedians, but has been most influenced by humorous authors such as George Bernard Shaw and Roald Dahl.
