= Eisenhower Nduwa Mkaka =

Malawian politician (born 1973)

Honourable Eisenhower Nduwa Mkaka MP
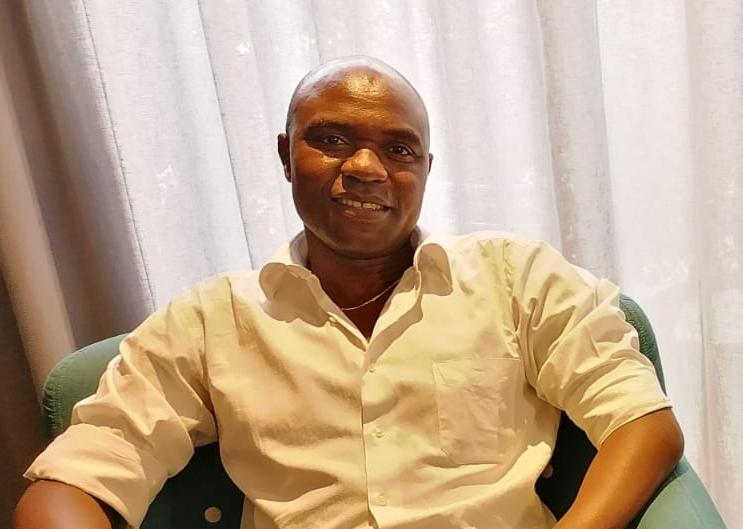

Former Minister of Natural Resources
- In office 27 January 2022 – 2023
- President: Lazarus Chakwera
- Preceded by: Nancy Tembo

Minister of Foreign Affairs
- In office 8 July 2020 – 27 January 2022
- Preceded by: Francis Kasaila
- Succeeded by: Nancy Tembo

Personal details
- Born: 12 September 1973 (age 53) Lilongwe, Malawi
- Party: Malawi Congress Party
- Children: 4
- Education: University of Malawi; Derby University

Eisenhower Nduwa Mkaka (born 12 September 1975) is a Malawian politician representing Lilongwe Mpenu Constituency. He served as Minister of Natural Resources following a cabinet reshuffle in January 2022. Mkaka has also held the position of Secretary General for the Malawi Congress Party, a role within the ruling political party.

== Early life ==
Eisenhower Mkaka was born on September 12, 1973, at Nkhoma Hospital to Teresa and Saxon Mkaka of Mphinzi II Village, TA Mazengera in Lilongwe. He did his early education at Chigodi Full Primary School, Nkhoma Demonstration School, Mphetsankhuli Full Primary School, and Nsalu Primary School.

At Nsalu Primary School Mkaka was selected to attend Mtendere Secondary School in Dedza, where he obtained a Malawi School Certificate of Education in 1996. In 2000, he went on to the University of Malawi, the Polytechnic where he graduated with a bachelor's degree in Business Administration.

In 2009, Mkaka completed a Master of Science (MSc.) in Strategic Management with merit at Derby University in the UK. Before his master's degree, he also completed a diploma in Banking from the University of South Africa/Institute of Bankers in 2007.

== Career ==
Eisenhower Mkaka worked at First Merchant Bank, now First Capital Bank from 2001 to 2012.

In 2018, Mkaka was elected Secretary General at the party's convention, after having been the acting Secretary General.

In 2019's Malawi Tripartite Elections, Mkaka was elected Member of Parliament for Lilongwe Mpenu Constituency. He was appointed Minister of Foreign Affairs in President Chakwera's cabinet in 2020.

In October 2020, Mkaka visited Morocco and signed four agreements to help Malawi-Moroccan cooperation. The Morocco government also announced 100 scholarships to Malawian students fully funded by the Kingdom. Mkaka expressed his support of Morocco's disputed claims to Western Sahara.

He has also stated that Malawi will open an embassy to Israel in Jerusalem.

In the January 2022 Cabinet Reshuffle, President Lazarus Chakwera moved Mkaka from Foreign Affairs to become the new Minister of Natural Resources.
