= George Chaponda =

Malawian politician

Honourable George Tapatula Chaponda MP
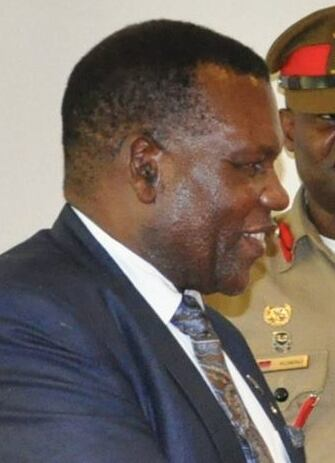
- Chaponda in 2016

Minister of Foreign Affairs and International Cooperation
- Incumbent
- Assumed office 5 October 2025
- President: Peter Mutharika
- Preceded by: Nancy Tembo
- In office 19 June 2014 – 7 April 2016
- President: Peter Mutharika
- Preceded by: Ephraim Chiume
- Succeeded by: Francis Kasaila

Minister of Agriculture, Irrigation and Water Development
- In office 7 April 2016 – 22 February 2017
- Preceded by: Allan Chiyembekeza

Member of Parliament for Mulanje South West
- Incumbent
- Assumed office 2004

Personal details
- Born: 1 November 1942 (age 83) Chonde Village, Nyasaland (now Malawi)
- Party: Democratic Progressive Party
- Children: Daliso Chaponda
- Education: University of Delhi; University of Zambia; Yale University (J.S.D)

George Tapatula Chaponda (born 1 November 1942) is a Malawian diplomat and politician who served as a minister in the Cabinet of Malawi between 2004 and 2017, and who has served as Leader of the Opposition in the National Assembly of Malawi since 2024. He is a founding member of the Democratic Progressive Party (DPP) and is a DPP Member of Parliament from Mulanje district in southern Malawi. He became the Minister of Foreign Affairs in 2025.

== Early life ==
Born in Chonde Village, Mulanje District, Chaponda studied at the University of Delhi from 1963 to 1968 where he received degrees in history and political science. He studied law at the University of Zambia from 1976 to 1979 and at Yale University from 1980 to 1984. He was admitted to the bar in 1980.

== Career ==
He has held a number of senior positions in Zambia, including chief executive of a parastal organisation. From 1984 to 2002, he worked mostly as a senior lawyer for the Office for the United Nations High Commissioner for Refugees in Somalia, Kenya, Thailand, Bangladesh, Switzerland, Austria, Poland and Ethiopia. From 2003 to 2004 he was Chairman of the University Council of the University of Malawi. In 2004 Chaponda entered Malawian politics and was elected as a member of parliament for the Mulanje South West constituency. In June 2004, he was appointed Minister of Foreign Affairs in the cabinet of the newly elected President Bingu wa Mutharika. He served in that position until 2005, when he was appointed Minister of Local Government and Rural Development. After the elections in May 2009, Mutharika appointed him Minister of Education, but moved him to lead the Ministry of Justice and Constitutional Affairs in 2010. The entire cabinet was dismissed on 19 August 2011.

In September 2011, Mutharika re-appointed him to cabinet as Minister of Education, Science and Technology. He served in that post until April 2012, when the president died suddenly of a heart attack. Mutharika's successor, Joyce Banda, appointed Chaponda Minister of Foreign Affairs and International Cooperation on 22 June 2014.

On 7 April 2016, Banda's successor Peter Mutharika moved Chaponda to the Ministry of Agriculture, Irrigation and Water Development. Mutharika then appointed Chaponda as Leader of the House of Assembly in May 2016. Chaponga as a result of his involvement in Maizegate. He was succeeded by his deputy Kondwani Nankhumwa in an interim capacity, pending the results of Chaponda's ongoing corruption investigation. Chaponda was rumoured to have been groomed to succeed Mutharika as President.

In May 2024, Chaponda became Leader of the Opposition in the National Assembly, following his predecessor Nankhumwa's expulsion from the DPP.

In October 2025, Chaponda was re-appointed Minister of Foreign Affairs following the re-election of Peter Mutharika in the 2025 general election. In June 2026 Habiba Osman of the Human Rights Commission was interviewed concerning the progress made in gender equality. Malawi's Gender Equality Act requires that neither gender can hold less than 40% of positions in Malawi. However Chaponda had appointed only one woman in twenty heads of mission. She said the commission had a serious concern about the disregard for the law. Women created most of the wealth but they were not having equal access to decisions.

=== Air Fouling Legislation ===
In February 2011, Chaponda said that a clause in the Local Courts bill making it a misdemeanor to "vitiate the atmosphere" would criminalize flatulence to "promote decency". He told the private Capital Radio's popular Straight Talk programme, "Would you be happy to see people farting anyhow?" The story was quickly picked up by the foreign press. The Solicitor General Anthony Kamanga contradicted him, saying the bill referred only to air pollution. Later, Chaponda retracted his remarks, saying he had not read the proposed bill before commenting.

== Personal life ==
Chaponda is a Christian, is married and has children. During a parliamentary debate in the Malawi parliament in 2016, he was involved in an altercation with a member of parliament from the opposition People's Party (PP), Harry Mlekanjala Mkandawire. Mkandawire is said to have said Chaponda is one of seven ministers alleged to be in an audit report for the plunder of government funds in Malawi, popularly known as Cashgate.

His son, comedian Daliso Chaponda, appeared on Britain's Got Talent in 2017, claiming Amanda Holden's Golden Buzzer. He ended up finishing in third place.

| Preceded by Lilian Patel | Foreign Minister of Malawi; 2004-2005 | Succeeded by Davis Katsonga |
