= Chilobwe murders =

Series of murders in Blantyre, Malawi

Map of Blantyre, murder location

The Chilobwe murders were a series of murders, numbering at least thirty killings, which took place over several months starting in November 1968 in the suburbs of Blantyre, Malawi, particularly in Chilobwe. A number of rumours grew up around these murders, and many blamed them on the South African Government which, according to various popular accounts, wanted repayment of loans it had given to the Malawi Government, either in human blood or by the enslavement of Malawians to work in South Africa. These rumours were politically damaging to the government of Hastings Banda, which cultivated friendly relations with South Africa's white minority government, and he treated the murders as a serious issue requiring urgent resolution. The murders were never fully solved. Several men were arrested in connection with the murders in 1969, but acquitted for lack of evidence. This caused popular outrage at the criminal justice system which, at that time, was still based on English law and practice. In 1970 another man, Walla Laini Kawisa, made several confessions admitting to some of the murders. He was condemned to death and probably executed in May 1972. It is unlikely that the murders were the work of a single individual, and various theories have been proposed, some linking them to opposition to Banda. Banda himself blamed the murders on ex-ministers involved in the Cabinet Crisis of 1964, and removed Gomile Kumtumanji, a Member of Parliament cabinet minister for the Southern Region from office and had him tried for treason, allegedly for complicity in them.

== Murders ==
Between September 1968 and March 1970, a large number of brutal murders occurred at night and in the victims' own homes in the suburbs of Malawi's largest city, Blantyre. At least 31 murders were said to have been committed by the same person or group, and they are collectively known as the Chilobwe murders. The murders were often accompanied by mutilation of the victims' bodies, and these mutilations were said to be suggestive of a belief in witchcraft or magic by whoever carried out the killings. Although these murders were particularly identified with the suburb of Chilobwe, they also took place in other areas. Many of the victims were poor and lived in housing with badly fitting doors and windows or unreliable locks, which offered little resistance to forced entry. The Government's failure to make any arrests caused panic and led to criticism of the police and government. One persistent rumour was that the Government was itself responsible for the murders, and had drained the victims' blood to send to South Africa.

In 1969, five people were arrested and charged with one of the Chilobwe murders in the Nakulenga case (named after the lead defendant). The accused were said to have entered a house, killed a man and a woman and left another man seriously injured. At first, the injured man told the police that he could not identify the attackers, but eleven days later he claimed that he was now able to identify some of them. At the close of the prosecution in the High Court, the defence argued that there was no case to answer. Justice Bolt, the trial judge, observed that these inconsistent statements affected the main witness's credibility, and that other witnesses had also given inconsistent evidence. One of the charges against the defendants was dismissed because, although there was some evidence, it was clearly unreliable. The President made a statement saying that, if the judge had any conscience, he should resign. There were no further proceedings on the other charges, but the defendants remained in detention, because Banda said that lack of evidence was not proof of innocence.

Parliamentary reaction was hostile, and several speakers, including ministers, openly suggested that European judges and the European-style legal system had allowed clearly guilty defendants to escape the punishment they deserved. One speaker suggested that expatriate judges were particularly unfitted to deal with cases involving witchcraft, which this case involved. It was also suggested that African custom and tradition did not require such conclusive evidence of guilt as systems based on English law did, as they did not involve such English law principles as the Presumption of innocence, the establishment of guilt beyond reasonable doubt and sufficient corroborating evidence. This criticism and the consequent resignation of Justice Bolt, the formation of Traditional Courts, where lawyers were generally prevented from appearing and the abolition of the right of appeal to the High Court led to the resignation of the other four High Court judges, all English, on the basis that justice was not adequately safeguarded under the new arrangements.

== Legal background ==
From 1902, English law had been established as the normally-recognised legal code in Nyasaland, and a High Court was established on the English model. Customary law was allowed (but not mandatory) in cases involving Africans, if "native" law or custom was not repugnant to English legal principles. A form of Indirect rule was instituted in 1933, with the chiefs and their councils who became Native Authorities, which operated Local Courts with limited criminal jurisdiction and subject both to control by European District Officers and the right of appeal to the High Court.

Malawi has adopted "an administrative view of law": its courts are regarded as instruments for achieving the goals set forth by officials, as a White Paper of 1965 states: "The function of a judge is not to question or obstruct the policies of the Executive Government, but to ascertain the purpose of these policies by reference to the laws made by Parliament and fairly and impartially to give effect to those purposes in the Courts when required to do so." The verdict in the Nakulenga case did not achieve the government's objective of finding guilty parties so, in these terms, the European-style legal system had failed to deliver the correct result.

After the Nakulenga case, the Local Courts became Traditional Courts with extended criminal jurisdiction, including in cases of murder, using "customary" rules of evidence and procedure. The President of Malawi and the Chief Traditional Courts Commissioner gained extensive powers to supervise the Courts and review cases. The law itself remained unchanged, but it was to be administered in a different way. From 1970 the Traditional Courts were given jurisdiction to hear all homicide and treason cases involving Africans. Each Court consisted of three traditional chiefs, a chairman who was also a chief and one lawyer.

== Case against Kawisa ==
Walla Laini Kawisa was arrested on 7 March 1970 after his fingerprints were matched to those at an attempted break-in, unconnected with any murder. Following his arrest, he was implicated in three of the Chilobwe murders in which eight people were killed. The police produced some evidence, amounting to the finding of items said to have been stolen from some victims at Kawisa's house, and of thumb- or palm-prints "similar" to his at two murder locations. His fingerprints were not found on a murder weapon recovered from one murder scene. The Prosecutor at his trial accepted that, without his confessions, there was nothing to link him to any murders other than these three.

During 19 months in detention, Kawisa made three contradictory confessions, although in each of these he confessed to murder. In his first confession, he implicated Henry Chipembere, an ex-minister, and also a local Malawi Congress Party Chairman, and claimed to be part of a group of 13 killers. In the second confession, he said that he was one of four murderers, and in the last confession he claimed to have acted alone. In his last confession, he said that the police had forced him to give the names of associates, which he invented: he also retracted the names of the politicians he had mentioned.

The case against Kawisa was heard by the Southern Regional Traditional Court on 19 October 1971. Kawisa had no legal representation, and he pleaded guilty to the three counts against him, involving eight murders. The Prosecutor told the Court that Kawisa had agreed to have other charges taken into account, but no evidence was produced in these other cases. Kawisa pleaded guilty to all the details of the three charges specified. As Traditional Courts rely heavily on confession evidence, the Court had to choose from the three conflicting confessions. It accepted the last confession as being most consistent with the evidence, but it indicated that the murders may have been politically motivated. The court's decision that Kawisa had acted alone was greeted with outrage, and Banda expressed his disbelief that Kawisa could have acted alone. As one of the three counts against Kawisa involved the murder of three adults and two children without the neighbours being alerted, and as the murder weapon in this case bore fingerprints that could not be identified, this disbelief was reasonable.

However, even after the review by the National Traditional Court of Appeal and its assertion that Kawisa could not have acted alone, no further action was taken to find any of his possible associates. Kawisa was almost certainly mentally abnormal, however according to traditional beliefs, this could have been caused by the misuse of magical substances (which Kawisa had claimed in his confessions to have used to silence his victims) and was no defence. If he were legally insane, the Traditional Court should not have found him guilty, but it relied on a brief medical statement that he was sane. Malawian Traditional Courts have generally been unwilling to accept the defence of insanity.

On 30 October 1971, Kawisa was found to be solely responsible for thirty-one murders and fifteen attempted murders. He was sentenced to death by hanging and the court denied him the possibility of an appeal, as he had pleaded guilty. The case was, however, reviewed by the National Traditional Court of Appeal, which upheld both conviction and sentence although it also suggested that Kawisa could not have acted alone. In June, 1972, there were rumours that Kawisa had been hanged in Zomba prison, although no public announcement was made.

== Aftermath ==
After the end of Kawisa's trial, no attempts were apparently made to track down any associates he might have had, and his execution (whenever it took place) prevented his being questioned further. Despite Banda's expressed disbelief in Kawisa acting alone, it was probably politically expedient, particularly from the point of view of relations with South Africa that further action was dropped. However, as the murders were probably not the work of a mentally unbalanced individual, there has been considerable speculation about any organization that may have arranged the murders, if Kawisa did not act alone, and whether there was any political motivation behind the killings.

It has been suggested that the downfall in 1976 of Albert Muwalo, a cabinet minister who was later executed, and of Focus Gwede, Head of the Police Special Branch, (who was sentenced to death, but reprieved), resulted from their being implicated in the Chilobwe murders. Informers accused both men of trying to discredit Banda by spreading the politically damaging rumours of Malawi Government involvement in the murders. It was also claimed that Gomile Kumtamanji, as Minister of Health, had access to chloroform, used to silence the victims. Since the overthrow of Banda in 1993, some Malawian writers have suggested that the Chilobwe murders represented opposition to the Banda regime among urban workers, and that the murders were random and intended to destabilise Banda's government. These also argue that Gomile Kumtamanji at least did lead opposition to Banda, so that his trial was not merely a dictator's paranoid fantasy.

== See also ==
- List of fugitives from justice who disappeared

== Sources ==
- P Brietzke, (1974). The Chilobwe Murders Trial, African Studies Review, Vol. 17, No. 2.
- R Carver, (1990). Where Silence Rules: The Suppression of Dissent in Malawi, Human Rights Watch. ISBN 978-0-929692-73-9
- Y Juwayeyi, M Makhambera and D D Phiri, (1999). Democracy with a price: The history of Malaŵi since 1900, Heinemann Educational. ISBN 978-0-435-94874-0.
- Z Kadzimira (1971), Constitutional Changes in Malawi, 1891–1965, Zomba, University of Malawi History Conference 1967.
- O J M Kalinga, (2012). Historical Dictionary of Malawi, Rowman and Littlefield. ISBN 978-0-8108-5961-6.
- J Lwanda, (2009). Politics, Culture and Medicine in Malawi: Historical Continuities and Ruptures with Special Reference to HIV/AIDS, University of Malawi Press, ISBN 978-99908-76-13-0.
- J Power, (2010). Political Culture and Nationalism in Malawi: Building Kwacha, University of Rochester Press, ISBN 978-1-58046-310-2.
- L Rosen, (1978). Law and Social Change in the New Nations, Comparative Studies in Society and History, Vol. 20, No. 1,
- R I Rotberg, (1965). The Rise of Nationalism in Central Africa: The Making of Malawi and Zambia, 1873–1964, Cambridge (Mass), Harvard University Press.
