= St Mary's Secondary School, Zomba =

Roman Catholic girls' secondary school in Zomba, Malawi

St Mary's Secondary School
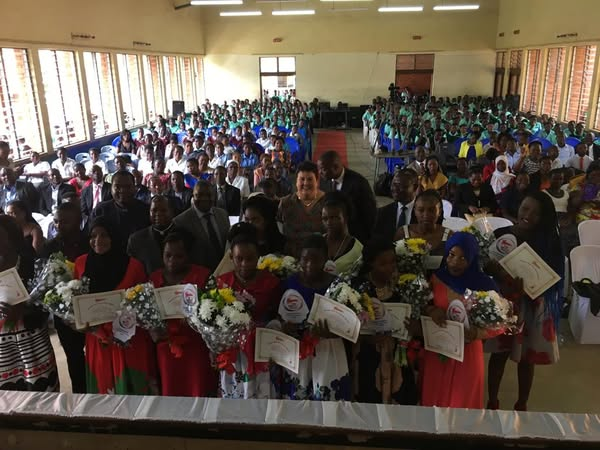
- Zodiak top girl award in 2019

Location
- Zomba; Malawi
- 15.3980°S 35.3187°E

Information
- Established: 1939 (87 years ago)

St Mary's Secondary School is a Roman Catholic secondary school for girls in Zomba, Malawi.

== History ==
The school's first building was built in 1939 and it was for many years a primary school run by the Daughters of Wisdom. However in 1962 it re-opened as a secondary school and in 1971 additional buildings meant that it could become a boarding school.

Its capacity has been 340 pupils but the actual number of students can be 600.

Of the eleven awardees with the highest marks in the country in 2018, four were students at St Mary's. In the 2019 MCSE examination results, St Mary's secured a place in the top ten schools in Malawi.

The school's library could accommodate 120 pupils but thanks to a bank's donation the library was expanded to take 200 pupils.

The head of the school was Sister Mary Chimalizeni before she became the provincial superior of the Daughters of Wisdom.

== Alumni ==
- Gertrude Mutharika, First Lady of Malawi.
