= Traditional courts in Malawi =

Dispute mediation and prosecution system

In Malawi a system of Traditional Courts (also known as Native Courts or Local Courts under colonial legislation) has been used for much of the twentieth century to mediate civil disputes and to prosecute crimes, although for much of the colonial period, their criminal jurisdiction was limited. From 1970, Regional Traditional Courts were created and given jurisdiction over virtually all criminal trials involving Africans of Malawian descent, and any appeals were directed to a National Traditional Court of Appeal rather than the Malawi High Court and from there to the Supreme Court of Appeal, as had been the case with the Local Courts before 1970.

The Traditional Courts were supposed to operate in accordance with African law and custom, although they applied an authoritarian, restrictive and punitive version of customary law, in line with the views of Hastings Banda, the first President of Malawi. During the 1970s and 1980s, these courts gained a reputation for being used to prosecute Banda's political opponents and being corrupt. After the restoration of multi-party politics, the operation of the Regional Traditional Courts and the National Traditional Court of Appeal was suspended in 1993.

Many of the former lower-level Traditional Courts became magistrates' courts, able to apply customary law, but subject to appeal to the High Court. The Malawi Constitution of 1994 recognised customary law as an integral part of the legal system and provided for Traditional Courts with limited jurisdiction over civil and minor criminal cases, but no legislation to set up such courts was introduced until 2011. In February 2011, the Malawi Parliament approved legislation re-introducing local traditional courts handling most civil cases and some minor criminal cases, as a means of making justice more accessible to rural Malawians. This legislation had not been put into effect because of financial constraints as of May 2017.

== History of customary law ==
In pre-colonial times, customary African law comprised a flexible set of rules on conduct and social obligations which was accepted by the community. Customary African law has been typified by as more concerned with the resolution of disputes than the punishment of crimes. Many systems of customary African law have little recognition of crimes, in the sense of a specific offence committed against, and prosecuted by, a society as opposed to torts or civil wrongs to be pursued by the individual affected as a plaintiff. Some offences, for example patricide, incest or witchcraft were, however, so serious as to be regarded as crimes against the community involving the death of those guilty. Although it has sometimes been claimed that, because of its flexibility and basis in custom, it was not really law, experts in African legal systems such as Eugene Cotran have demonstrated it was. Cotran also showed that, despite some informality, assemblies of people meeting to administer customary law are clearly courts. However, in the colonial period, English law and legal procedures were introduced and given priority over customary Law, which tended to be labelled “native law”, “local law” or “traditional law”. Europeans also sought to codify these laws, which as a result, became increasingly rigid.

From 1902, English law was established as the normally-recognised legal code in the Nyasaland Protectorate, and a High Court was established on the English model. Customary law was allowed (but not mandatory) in cases involving Africans, if that "native" law or custom was not repugnant to English legal principles. It was generally regarded as repugnant in three areas; witchcraft, the use of poison ordeals and existence of slavery. The prohibition of customary law in these areas weakened the authority of traditional leaders who administered that law. From the late 19th century, the protectorate was divided into districts, with a Collector of Revenue (later called a District Commissioner in charge of each, responsible for collecting taxes and also with judicial duties that were not finally revoked until 1962. At first, the powers of existing chiefs were minimised in favour of direct rule by the Collectors. Hereditary chiefs and appointed headmen with very limited powers acted as local intermediaries between the protectorate administration and the local people. Indirect rule was instituted in 1933; the chiefs and their councils became Native Authorities with limited judicial powers, usually restricted to civil cases under customary law and little money to enforce them. However, the Native Courts established by legislation in 1933 provided a recognised forum in which customary law applied, mainly in such areas as marital disputes, inheritance and disputes about the right to use certain land. The procedures in these courts were meant to be simple and expeditious, and the Native Courts Ordinance 1933 prohibited legal representation of defendants in the interests of achieving substantial justice, without involving legal technicalities.

It was argued by Martin Chanock that, as a reaction to the rapid social and economic changes that took place in the late pre-colonial and early colonial periods, older men in many African communities sought to impose their authoritarian and restrictive interpretation of customary law, which they used to control younger men and particularly women. It was this view of traditional law as a punitive instrument rather than a means of mediating disputes that was presented to the Europeans codifying these laws. It was also the view of traditional law in Malawi that inspired both the then-Prime Minister, Banda, and the Minister of Justice Orton Chirwa to criticise such principles of English-based law as the presumption of innocence, the need to establish guilt beyond reasonable doubt and the requirement for corroborating evidence. By 1969, Aleke Banda, the Minister of Finance, openly attacked the use of defence lawyers and the safeguards or restrictions imposed by the English-law Rules of evidence. Dr Banda specifically linked traditional law to punishment, and claimed that lack of evidence was not proof of innocence.

== The traditional courts ==
Shortly before independence, which took place in 1964, a Local Courts Ordinance in 1962 amended the 1933 Native Courts legislation, and recognised several levels of courts with varying powers to hear disputes based on customary law and some criminal cases. After independence, this ordinance was renamed the Traditional Courts Act, 1962. The local courts set up were no longer solely the courts of traditional chiefs, as had been the case under the 1933 legislation, although many such chiefs were appointed to them. This legislation provided guarantees of a fair trial, including the possibility of legal representation and the right to appeal to the High Court. The 1962 Act, provided that customary law should only apply if not inconsistent with any written law in force, and its courts could only hear types of case they were specifically authorised to try, generally excluding the more serious criminal cases. The legislation made it clear that, in criminal cases, these courts were to apply the existing penal code and not customary criminal rules. The Local Courts Ordinance 1963 allowed legal representation of defendants, at the discretion of the court. Also in 1962, the judicial powers of the district commissioners were ended and they were replaced by legally trained magistrates.

From 1970, the Local Courts (Amendment) Act, 1969 transformed the traditional courts system. It set up three Regional Traditional Courts and a National Traditional Court of Appeal above the existing network of lower-level traditional courts set up under the 1962 Act, and gave them extended criminal jurisdiction (including all homicide and treason cases involving Africans), using "customary" rules of evidence and procedure. These lower courts consisted of two grades of local traditional courts, Traditional Appeal courts that heard determine appeals from these courts and District Traditional courts. In each case, the civil and criminal jurisdiction of the court was determined by the warrant that established it, as varied by any later ministerial orders. Although the criminal law set out in the Malawi Penal Code, which was based on the colonial code of 1930, remained unchanged and applied to both the High Court and the Traditional courts, cases were dealt with in different ways in the two sets of courts. Traditional courts only apply those such sections of the penal code that the Minister of Justice directed and had their own rules of procedure. They were not bound by the same rules of evidence as the High Court, but applied the customary law of their area, supplemented by ministerial directions. Defendants usually had no choice of which court would try them; if they were African, it would be a Traditional Court.

The President of Malawi and the Chief Traditional Courts Commissioner gained extensive powers to supervise these courts and review cases, and defence lawyers were not allowed to plead for accused persons. Not only was there no right of appeal to the High Court, but appeals to the National Traditional Court of Appeal were at the discretion of the Minister of Justice, a post held by Banda himself. Defendants had no right to call witnesses; this was at the discretion of the judges (an in the case of the Chirwas, it was refused), and they are not given a summary of the charges against them before the trial, so cannot prepare a defence. These provisions removed some of the guarantees of a fair trial which the 1962 Act had given, and (in some respects) reverted to the rules that had applied under the 1933 Ordinance. From November 1971, the Traditional Courts Act, allowed the Minister of Justice to direct that some Traditional courts could hear cases where any or all of the parties were non-African. The Act also provided that no traditional court case could be declared void on appeal because of any defect in procedure, and that the Chief Traditional Courts Commissioner should decide any disputed matters on the basis of "substantial justice" without undue regard to legal technicalities. Although Traditional courts were supposed to apply the Malawi Penal Code, they were free to do so in accordance with customary procedures, which enabled them disregard precedents from earlier Malawi High Court cases, and to determine what "customary procedures" were. Each traditional court consisted of a chairman, who was often a traditional chief, three other lay members (also often chiefs) known as assessors and one lawyer. Chairmen and assessors, who were supposed to be individuals who commanded respect and with a considerable knowledge of the customary law of the area served by the court, were appointed by the Minister of Justice, Banda, and could be dismissed by him. Appointments were recommended by the Chief Traditional Courts Commissioner and regional Traditional Courts Commissioners, after consultation with the Regional Chairman of the Malawi Congress Party for the area. This system ensured that appointees would support government policy.

Although it was suggested that the 1969 legislation was prompted by widespread public criticism of the judicial system after government prosecutors failed to secure a conviction in the first trial in the Chilobwe murders case, the existing system was already under attack. Banda made extensive use of courts as part of his efforts to establish traditional systems in Malawi. The Traditional courts eventually became the primary means of law enforcement in Malawi. In these courts, prosecutors had much greater power than in the parallel High Court system.

== Leading Traditional Court cases ==
Two high-profile cases show how the system of traditional courts was manipulated to silence opponents of the Banda government. Perhaps the most flagrant misuse of the Traditional Court system occurred in the trial in 1976 of Albert Muwalo (also known as Albert Muwalo Nqumayo), Secretary General of the Malawi Congress Party and Focus Gwede, Head of the Police Special Branch, on a charge of attempting to assassinate President Banda. Both these men had been closely associated with highly repressive government policies in the 1970s, but the crime they were accused of involved plotting to overthrow that government. Banda had defined plotting to overthrowing the government as merely speaking aloud about it, but there was little evidence that the accused had even done that. The only concrete evidence against the men was their illegal possession of firearms. However, the Traditional Court admitted as evidence three anonymous and unsubstantiated letters that denounced the men, on the basis, “…there is no smoke without fire” and recordings of two telephone conversations about the guns, which did not discuss any plans to use them. In order to establish a motive for the alleged treason, the court considered Muwalo’s possession of photographs of ex-ministers who fled Malawi after the Cabinet Crisis of 1964 and copies of books which the court deemed subversive, although only one was actually banned. The court held that mere possession of the photographs of people who had, “…rebelled against the Malawi government” made the owner a rebel, and owning the books was enough to brand their owner a communist sympathiser. There was even less “evidence” against Gwede, but both men were sentenced to death for treason. Muwalo was hanged, but Gwede received a last minute reprieve and remained in prison until 1993.

The case of Orton Chirwa and his wife, Vera, also demonstrated the deficiencies in the system. At the end of their appeal in 1983, the minority of the appellate judges, those that had legal training, questioned the guilty verdict, but were overruled by the majority composed of traditional chiefs. The case itself concerned Chirwa, a barrister and former Minister of Justice until the 1964 Cabinet Crisis. He fled Malawi for Tanzania, where he formed a political party among Malawian exiles. At their trial, the Chirwas claimed that they had been abducted from Zambia in December 1981. This, and the charge that they had conspired to overthrow the government outside Malawi, should have meant that the Traditional courts had no jurisdiction. The case could still have been heard in Malawi’s High Court, but that court required proof of guilt beyond reasonable doubt. The treason case heard against the Chirwas by the Southern Region Traditional Court in 1983 was based on handwritten documents said to have been found on them when arrested, and a police officer’s “expert” testimony that they were indeed in Orton Chirwa’s handwriting. An unsigned statement said to have been made by Orton Chirwa, but repudiated by him, and a transcript said to have been made of a taped interview he had given were also admitted as evidence. The Chirwas were not allowed to call witnesses from outside Malawi and were both sentenced to death. On appeal to the National Traditional Court of Appeal, the refusal of the lower court to allow defence witnesses, its admission of the unsigned statement and its acceptance of a police officer as an expert witness were all criticised, and minority of the judges did not accept that creating unpublished handwritten documents amounted to treason. the majority however regarded the documents, which they treated as genuine, as evidence of an intention to overthrow the state by force, which they equated to treason. The appeal court also came to the startling conclusion that, even if the Traditional courts had no jurisdiction in law, they had a traditional right to try the Chirwas, and that (despite the deficiencies in the lower court’s handling of the case), their decision was correct and should stand. The death sentences were commuted, but Orton Chirwa died in prison in 1992. Vera Chirwa was released from prison in 1993 after over 11 years in prison, mostly in solitary confinement.

== The 1994 changes ==
During the transition to democracy, the Attorney-General suspended the operation of the three Regional Traditional courts and the National Traditional Appeal Court in October 1993. Their indefinite suspension amounted in practice to their abolition. When the new Constitution came into force on 18 May 1994, it established a court structure in which magistrates' courts would hear cases involving customary law, with appeals lying to the High Court and the Supreme Court of Appeal, and it transferred all cases pending before the Traditional courts and its appeals court to Magistrates' courts or the High Court. The chairmen of many of the lower-level Traditional courts were appointed as magistrates and their courts became Magistrates' Courts. Many of those lower level Traditional courts that were not converted into Magistrates' courts continued to operate informally. The 1994 Constitution recognised customary law as an integral part of the legal system and provided for courts using customary law with limited jurisdiction over civil and minor criminal cases, but no legislation to set up such courts was introduced before 2011, possibly because there was a limited demand for formal traditional courts, as most communities had informal traditional mechanisms for the settlement of disputes.

== 2011 Local Courts bill ==
In 2007 the government of Malawi established a commission to review the possibility of re-introducing formal local traditional courts. After the completion of the review, the government introduced a bill that would provide Local Courts able to prosecute some criminal cases. The 2011 Local Courts legislation created Local Courts that would primarily handle nuisance crimes as well as crimes such as defamation. Some Malawian politicians and human rights activists have derided the bill, characterizing it as a plan for Kangaroo courts that could be used for political repression. Ibrahim Matola of the United Democratic Front has argued that the courts will provide too much power to local chiefs and could devolve into a "draconian system". Opposition leader John Tembo has condemned the plan as incompatible with a multi party democracy. The Malawi Congress Party has also criticized the plan, claiming that it will unconstitutionally takes away power from the Judicial branch of government. The Solicitor General of Malawi, Anthony Kamanga, has disputed this claim, arguing that the Constitution of Malawi allows for the limited use of local courts. The Justice Minister of Malawi, George Chaponda, has also defended the bill, citing the fact that serious crimes will not be handled by the local courts as proof that there is no danger of human rights abuses. Chaponda claims that the plans are popular with most Malawians, and that his critics are not “conversant with the historical development of this country.”

The legislation provided for two levels of courts: a number of Local Courts to established in each of Malawi's 27 districts, mainly in rural areas and District Appeals Local Courts, one in each district, to hear appeals from the Local Courts. Further appeals may be made to the High Court, to which both types of Local Courts are subordinate. Each local court and District Appeals Local Court would be headed by chairperson, who need not be a lawyer, but with a reasonable standard of education, proficiency in English and adequate knowledge of the customary law and language of the area that the court serves. Local Courts also have assessors to advise on local customary law. Assessor must be at least 50 years old. The Local Courts would have no jurisdiction over civil cases involving title to or ownership of customary land, property inheritance involving the guardianship of infants, issues of witchcraft or about a chief's title. This is to help limit possible corruption. Complaints have been made that the Local Courts, popularly called Traditional Courts are charging excessive court fees to settle disputes.

== Situation since 2012 ==
Although parliament passed the bill, as the Local Courts Act in February 2011, as the result of strong opposition, the president Bingu wa Mutharika agreed to refer this legislation to the Malawi Law Commission, which had not completed its review when the President died in April 2012. The new President Joyce Banda confirmed that the review should continue but the election as President in May 2014 of Peter Mutharika, brother of Bingu wa Mutharika and a statement from the Law Commission that there is nothing fundamentally wrong with the 2011 Act brought the review to an end. However, although the current Malawian government recognises the need to provide the rural poor in particular with an accessible system of justice, it lacks the funds to implement the proposed reform.
