= Sanjika Palace =

Building in Malawi

Coordinates: 15.7896°S 34.9779°E

- Interactive map of Sanjika Palace

General information
- Location: Blantyre, Southern Region, Malawi
- Current tenants: Peter Mutharika, President of the Republic of Malawi
- Opened: 1983; 42 years ago

Sanjika Palace is the official residence of the president of the Republic of Malawi. The government has made it as the official home since 1983 and it is located in the Blantyre, Southern Region.

The current occupant of Sanjika Palace is Peter Mutharika, President of the Republic of Malawi since 28 June 2020.

The residential place, however, has had some reports of ghost stories in the past years.

== Incidents ==
On June 14, 2021, a man was shot in both legs for trespassing at the palace.
