= Mapopa Chipeta =

Malawian politician

Mapopa Chipeta is a former Malawian politician. Chipeta was foreign minister of his country from 1997-1999.

Preceded by George Ntafu	Foreign Minister of Malawi; 1997–1999	Succeeded by Brown Mpinganjira
