= George Ntafu =

Malawian politician

George Nga Ntafu (1943 in Likoma Island, Nyasaland – October 20, 2015 in Blantyre, Malawi) was a Malawian politician. Ntafu was foreign minister from 1996-1997.

== Life ==
He was Malawi's first neurosurgeon. He was imprisoned without trial for disagreeing with President Hastings Banda and released in 1991. He was a founding member of the United Democratic Front and he was an MP for Likoma. He was his party's leader in the National Assembly.

After his political life, he returned to practice until his death. He was married to Elvey Kalonga Mtafu and had two children, Anke Ntafu Pagaja and Bentley Nga Ntafu.

Ntafu died on 20 October 2015 at Mwaiwathu Private Hospital a few hours after being involved in a road accident when the car he was driving collided with a truck in Malawi's commercial city of Blantyre.

His wife arranged to have her his partially complete auto-biography to be published in 2021.

Preceded by Edward Bwanali	Foreign Minister of Malawi; 1996–1997	Succeeded by Mapopa Chipeta
