= Albert Muwalo =

Malawian politician (1927–1977)

- Born: Albert Andrew Muwalo Gandale Nqumayo; 23 June 1927; Ntcheu, Nyasaland
- Died: September 3, 1977 (aged 50); Zomba prison, Malawi
- Occupation: politician
- Known for: Minister 1964–76, executed 1977

Albert Andrew Muwalo Gandale Nqumayo (1927 – 1977) was a prominent politician in Malawi from the 1960s until he was sacked in 1976 and was executed in 1977. He entered politics in the mid 1950s through involvement in a hospital worker's trade union and membership of the Nyasaland African Congress, where his activities led to his detention without trial during the 1959 State of Emergency in Nyasaland. After his release, he joined the Malawi Congress Party (MCP), and became locally prominent in Ntcheu District as district MCP chairman and from 1962 as Member of Parliament for Ntcheu South. In 1963, he became Administrative Secretary of the MCP, and he was a prominent supporter of the then-Prime Minister, Hastings Banda during the Cabinet Crisis of 1964. Muwalo was rewarded for his loyalty with the cabinet post of Minister of Information in 1964, and in 1966 he became Minister of State in the President's Office. His close contact with Banda, both as minister in Banda's office and in the MCP gave him great power and, during the first half of the 1970s he and his relative, the Head of the Police Special Branch Focus Gwede, were heavily involved in the political repression of actual or suspected opponents of the Banda regime. In 1976, he and Gwede were arrested: the reasons for their arrests were unclear, but may have resulted from a power struggle among those around the ageing president or simply because he became too powerful and may have been seen by Banda as a threat. In 1977, the two were tried before a Traditional Court and after a trial whose fairness was in serious doubt, were both sentenced to death. Gwede was reprieved, but Muwalo was hanged on 3 September 1977.

== Early life and entry into politics ==
Albert Andrew Muwalo Gandale Nqumayo (or Ngumayo) was born in Ntcheu District, of Maseko Ngoni parentage on 23 June 1927, the second of seven children, all sons. After primary education at Gowa Mission in Ntcheu District, he attended the secondary school at Blantyre Mission, gaining a Junior Certificate in 1945. He worked at Zomba African Hospital, and undertook further study in evening classes at the hospital.Mr Muwalo obtained a certificate in Medical Laboratory Technology in 1954 as well as working as a medical assistant for 13 years. During the mid-1950s, his ambition was to undertake further study in Britain, but his detention in 1959 put an end to this, and he did not obtain the further education achieved by several of those who became ministers in 1961 and 1962. During his time at the hospital, he became involved in trade union activities through the Nyasaland African Medical Orderlies union, becoming its Secretary-General. He joined the Ntcheu branch of the Nyasaland African Congress and was active in demonstrating against the Federation of Rhodesia and Nyasaland. During the State of Emergency declared in March 1959, he was detained without trial in Nyasaland, unlike the most senior Congress members, who were imprisoned in Southern Rhodesia. After his release, he joined the Malawi Congress Party (MCP), and became active in its organisation, first in Ntcheu town and later as a party member and then Chairman of the MCP in Ntcheu District. Between 1962 and 1964, he was Chairman of Ntcheu District Council. Muwalo was Member of Parliament for Ntcheu South between 1964 and 1967, when he resigned owing to the pressures of his MCP work, although the seat was later held by his younger brother, Daniel.

Albert Muwalo became Administrative Secretary of the Malawi Congress Party in April 1963, in succession to Yatuta Chisiza, and he became the party's Secretary General in 1973. He entered the cabinet as Minister of Information in 1964, and became Minister of State in the President's Office in 1966 and Minister without Portfolio in 1976.

== Cabinet Crisis ==
Most of the ministerial appointees in 1961 and 1962 were relatively young, generally under 35 (only Orton Chirwa was over 40), with at least secondary, and often higher, education. A disproportionate number of these came from the Northern Region, because several mission schools there taught to a high standard. The group ranking just below the ministers, which included Muwalo, consisted of local MCP bosses who were generally older than the first group and usually less well educated but with stronger local ties than them, and often came from the Central and Southern regions. After the 1964 crisis, several of them replaced the former ministers.

Differences between Banda and his ministers arose after the 1963 election. From October 1963, Banda began to make slighting references to them in public speeches and accused some of them of forming a cabal against him. He dismissed one minister, took away another's responsibilities without removing him from the cabinet and reassigned portfolios in a cabinet reshuffle. As well as being Prime Minister, Banda retained four ministerial portfolios, devolving the day-to-day work to parliamentary secretaries. All this diminished the power and influence of the ministers. Banda also continued diplomatic relations with South Africa and Portugal, but refused to recognise the People's Republic of China or East Germany, and contemptuously rejected suggestions of forming closer ties with Zambia and Tanzania. The slow pace of Africanization in the Civil Service, the freezing of Civil Service salaries and the introduction of a charge for outpatients at state hospitals were all seen as failing to pass the benefits of independence to the people.

At the cabinet meeting of 26 August 1964, all the ministers present raised their concerns with Banda and presented him with a list of grievances. A number of ministers led by Yatutu Chisiza apparently wished to convert Banda's role from that of Prime Minister who expected to become an executive President, to that of a future President without executive functions, with an appointed Prime Minister as head of government. During the Cabinet Crisis of 1964, on 27 August Banda consulted Muwalo and Aleke Banda as leading officials of the MCP to ensure that leading party members in all three regions of Malawi supported him, rather than supporting the ministers who opposed him.

Banda advised Sir Glyn Smallwood Jones, the Governor-General of Malawi on 1 September of his intention to resign, which would automatically end the tenure of the other ministers. On his own reappointment he would reappoint the ministers, except for Kanyama Chiume, Yatuta Chisiza and possibly John Msonthi and Chipembere. The Governor-General advised him to seek a vote of confidence in parliament rather than resign, and on the day that this vote began, Banda secured the dismissal of three cabinet ministers: three others resigned in solidarity. President Banda saw Muwalo and Aleke Banda a great deal in September 1964, and their comments and the unity of the ex-ministers led him to believe that the latter were conspiring against him. The attempts of the Governor-General to secure a compromise after the vote of confidence led to an undertaking by Banda to reinstate the ministers, except for Chiume, Chisiza and Chipembere: he wished for the appointment of four new ministers, including Muwalo, possibly as Minister of Health. After the breakdown of attempts to find a compromise, because the ex-ministers insisted they should all be reinstated.

Muwalo was appointed as Minister of Information in September 1964. On 28 September, members of the Youth League of the MCP supporting Banda, who had been bussed into Zomba during the previous night, tried to close Zomba market and force those civil servants that were in strike back to work. However, the more numerous civil servants, armed themselves with sticks and attacked MCP supporters and burned down the party's national headquarters and a shop owned by the local MCP chairman. During these disturbances, Muwalo was assaulted by the pro-Chipembere crowd, and another newly-appointed minister was severely beaten. By 30 September supporters of the dismissed ministers controlled Zomba, and Muwalo and every other minister that supported Banda had left the town.

== Ministerial career ==
There are few detailed records of Muwalo's repressive activities between his appointment as a minister 1964 and his arrest in 1976, although as early as 1964, Banda urged anyone with any information on dissent to give this him or Muwalo. In this period, Muwalo exercised almost complete censorship over the Malawian media. The most important decisions of Banda's government were made orally, so the reasons for them are not documented and much of the discussion of those reasons relies on claims and allegations that cannot be verified. It is clear that Banda was ultimately responsible for the policy of the imprisonment, with or without trial, torture and occasional murder of actual or invented dissidents. However, as he grew older he acted on the information provided by the ministers and others closest to. There were several, often competing, sources of intelligence: Muwalo's associate Gwede controlled the Police Special Branch, while John Tembo organised a network of spies and informers through the Malawi Young Pioneers. Two matters that are better documented were the campaign against Jehovah's Witnesses and the reaction to the Chilobwe murders.

Muwalo and Gwede were closely associated with the implementation of repressive policies against political critics and even those seeking political neutrality, like Jehovah's Witnesses. After the removal of these two, the government's attitude appeared to have softened, at least for a time. Muwalo was linked to the persecution of Jehovah's Witnesses, that started in late 1963 before the pre-independence election, when Witnesses were beaten for failing to buy MCP cards, because their religious beliefs did not allow membership of political parties. In 1967, at the conference of the MCP, of which Muwalo was Administrative Secretary, it was agreed that Jehovah's Witnesses should be declared an "unlawful society", and it was soon declared to be such, leading to attacks in which at least five Witnesses were killed and many fled the country. The anti-Witness campaign resumed in 1972, with further killings and beating. Over 50,000 Witnesses fled to Zambia or Mozambique, although in 1973, the Zambian authorities, and in 1975 the government of newly independent Mozambique, forcibly repatriated the majority of these refugees. A fifth wave of persecution of Jehovah's Witnesses began in September 1975, mainly organised by local MCP members, but authorised at the party's highest level. This involved over 5,000 arrests, with many Witnesses being sentenced to three years in prison for membership of an illegal organisation, many beatings and destruction of Witnesses' property, and at least two more killings. After Muwalo's arrest, this wave of persecution ended, and many of those imprisoned or in detention were released. Although it is clear that the initial impetus for banning the Witnesses in 1967 came from Banda, Muwalo was responsible for organising much of the subsequent anti-Witness action.

Between September 1968 and March 1970, at least 31 brutal murders occurred at night and in the victims' own homes in the suburbs of Malawi's largest city, Blantyre. These were said to have been committed by the same person or group, and they are collectively known as the Chilobwe murders. They were often accompanied by mutilation of the victims' bodies suggestive of a belief in witchcraft or magic by whoever carried out the killings. Many of the victims lived in poor housing which offered little resistance to forced entry. The Government's failure to make any arrests caused panic and led to criticism of the police and government. One persistent rumour was that the Government was itself responsible for the murders, and that it had drained the victims' blood to send to South Africa. In 1969, rumours were widespread that Muwalo was responsible for the Chilobwe murders. Both Banda and Muwalo took these rumours seriously and Muwalo told the Malawi parliament that there was no truth in them; on the contrary, those who had committed the murders were agents of the ex-ministers involved in the 1964 Cabinet Crisis. At his trial, Muwalo was said to have started or spread rumours that the Chilobwe murders were ordered by the Malawi government, so the blood of the victims could be sold to South Africa. There has been speculation that the downfall of Muwalo and Focus Gwedwe was engineered by John Tembo and his niece Cecilia Kadzamira, as the two groups were rivals to control and succeed the ageing Banda. However, none of these rumours or speculation can be proven.

== Trial and Execution ==
For much of the first half of the 1970s, Muwalo was able to use his post as Minister of State in the President's Office and his MCP positions to control access to Banda and manipulate the information that Banda received, particularly on the repression that Muwalo and Gwede controlled. In June 1976, the change in his ministerial post to Minister without Portfolio was seen as a demotion and, at the end of the MCP Conference in September, Banda denounced abuses of power and stated that Muwalo was no closer to him than other ministers.

Muwalo was expelled from his posts of MCP Secretary General and Minister without Portfolio on 27 October 1976. The announcement gave the reason as a grave breach of discipline and stated that Muwalo would forfeit any property gained through his governmental or party posts. His expulsion occurred shortly after that of Focus Gwede, and both men were arrested, Muwalo on 27 October and Gwede on 10 November. It was suggested that these expulsions and arrests followed an investigation into the activities of Muwalo and Gwede which found the men had misused Banda's name when abusing their powers. In particular, the two men (who were related) interfered with a police investigation involving another relative.

The trial of Albert Muwalo and Focus Gwede was held in the Southern Region Traditional Court in March to April 1977. Traditional Courts did not allow defence lawyers to plead for the accused, who were not given a summary of the charges against them before the trial, so could not prepare a defence. Defendants had no right to call witnesses (which was at the discretion of the judges) nor to appeal (which was at the discretion of Minister of Justice, a post held by Banda). Finally, these courts were not bound by the normal rules of evidence.

The charge against Muwalo and Gwede was of attempting to assassinate President Banda and overthrow his government. Banda had defined plotting to and overthrow his government as merely speaking aloud about it, but there was little evidence that the accused had even done that. The only concrete evidence against the men was their illegal possession of firearms. However, the Traditional Court admitted as evidence three letters that denounced them for colluding with ex-ministers who fled Malawi after the Cabinet Crisis of 1964. One of the letters was anonymous, and of the two signed letters, one was disowned by the supposed signatory and the signatory of the other did not exist. Nevertheless, the court admitted all three on the basis, "... there is no smoke without fire". They also admitted recordings of two telephone conversations the defendants had about the guns, which did not discuss any plans to use them. In order to establish a motive for the alleged treason, the court considered Muwalo's possession of photographs of some of the ex-ministers and copies of books which the court deemed subversive, although only one was actually banned (this was George Orwell's Animal Farm). The court held that mere possession of the photographs of people who had, "... rebelled against the Malawi government" made the owner, Muwalo, a rebel, and owning the books was enough to brand him as a communist sympathiser. There was even less evidence, however unsatisfactory, against Gwede, but both men were sentenced to death for treason. Although Muwalo and Gwede were probably guilty of many crimes, the wholly insufficient evidence produced did not prove their guilt of the crime of which they were accused. An appeal against both conviction and sentence was heard by the National Traditional Court of Appeal in August 1977, but rejected. The two men were then transferred to the condemned cells of Zomba prison to await execution. Muwalo was hanged on 3 September 1977, but Gwede received a last minute reprieve and remained in prison until 1993.
