= Focus Gwede =

Focus Martin Gwede was head of the special branch of the Malawi Police Force. He was from Ntcheu Malawi. He was one of the most feared policemen during the Kamuzu Banda era. With Gwede as the head of Special Branch and Albert Muwalo as a Minister of State they made the most feared duo in Malawi.

He and Muwalo were accused of treason in 1976 for an alleged attempted coup. Muwalo was sentenced to death and Gwede spent 18 years in jail and was released in 1993 as a political prisoner. He died on March 3, 2011.

== Jumani Johansson Case ==
Gwede came out in support of a man claiming to be Banda's son. He confirmed that Kamuzu Banda had three children, and that he believes that Jumani Johansson is the son of Banda.

== Personal life ==
Gwede was married with 5 children.
