= Cabinet of Malawi =

Executive branch of the government

The Cabinet of Malawi is the executive branch of the government, made up of the President, Vice President, Ministers and Deputy Ministers responsible for the different departments.

== Cabinet as of 29 May 2026 ==
On 5 January 2026, the President of Malawi carried out a cabinet reshuffle, resulting in changes to ministerial portfolios and an expansion of the Cabinet from 24 to 28 members.

On 30 January 2026, the President made further changes to the Cabinet, appointing a new Minister of Trade following the transfer of George Partridge to the position of Governor of the Reserve Bank of Malawi. The President also swapped ministerial portfolios between Alfred Gangata and Patricia Wiskies, with Gangata moving to the Ministry of Youth, Sports and Culture and Wiskies taking over the Ministry of Natural Resources.

On 29 May 2026, President Mutharika restructured the Ministry of Energy and Mining by splitting it into two separate ministries. Jean Mathanga was appointed Minister of Energy, while Thoko Tembo, who had served as Deputy Minister of Agriculture, Irrigation & Water Development, was appointed Minister of Mining.

The table below reflects the composition of the Cabinet following the reshuffle.

Office	Minister
Second Vice President	Enoch Chihana
Minister of Finance and Economic Planning and Decentralization	Joseph Mwanamveka
Minister of Foreign Affairs	George Chaponda
Minister of Natural Resources	Patricia Wiskies
Minister of Agriculture, Irrigation & Water Development	Roza Fatch Mbilizi
Minister of Industrialisation, Business, Trade and Tourism	Simon Itaye
Minister of Education, Science and Technology	Bright Msaka
Minister of Justice and Constitutional Affairs	Charles Mhango
Minister of Health and Sanitation	Madalitso Baloyi
Minister of Local Government and Rural Development	Ben Phiri
Minister of Lands, Housing and Urban Development	Chimwemwe Chipungu
Minister of Transport and Public Works	Jappie Mhango
Minister of Homeland Security	Peter Mukhito
Minister of Gender, Children, Disability and Social Welfare	Mary Navicha
Minister of Energy	Jean Mathanga
Minister of Mining	Thoko Tembo
Minister of Labour Skills and Innovation	Joel Chigona
Minister of Youth, Sports and Culture	Alfred Gangata
Minister of Information and Communication Technology	Shadrick Namalomba
Minister of Defence	Feston Kaupa
Deputy Minister of Homeland Security (Operations)	Norman Chisale
Deputy Minister of Gender, Children, Disability and Social Welfare	Martha Mzomera Ngwira
Deputy Minister of Education, Science and Technology	Francis Foley
Deputy Minister of Natural Resources	Chipiliro Mpinganjira
Deputy Minister of Industrialisation, Business, Trade and Tourism	Edgar Tembo
Deputy Minister of Health and Sanitation	Charles Chilambula

== Cabinet as of 30 October 2025 ==
On 5 October 2025, President Peter Mutharika announced a first batch of appointments constituting a partial cabinet and senior leadership team, while several key ministries remain unfilled.

On 16 October, Mutharika made two further ministerial appointments, expanding the partial cabinet. These appointments were still part of an incomplete cabinet rollout.

On 30 October, President Mutharika completed the appointment of his full Cabinet, following earlier partial rollouts. The Cabinet now includes ministers and deputy ministers across all major government portfolios, combining returning officeholders with new appointees.

The table below presents the full Cabinet as of October 2025.

Office	Minister
Second Vice President	Enoch Chihana
Minister of Finance and Economic Affairs	Joseph Mwanamveka
Minister of Foreign Affairs	George Chaponda
Minister of State	Alfred Gangata
Minister of Agriculture, Irrigation & Water Development	Roza Fatch Mbilizi
Minister of Industrialisation, Business, Trade and Tourism	George Partridge
Minister of Education, Science and Technology	Bright Msaka
Minister of Justice and Constitutional Affairs	Charles Mhango
Minister of Health and Sanitation	Madalitso Baloyi
Minister of Local Government and Rural Development	Ben Phiri
Minister of Transport and Public Works	Feston Kaupa
Minister of Homeland Security	Peter Mukhito
Minister of Gender, Children, Disability and Social Welfare	Mary Navicha
Minister of Natural Resources, Energy and Mining	Jean Mathanga
Minister of Labour Skills and Innovation	Joel Chigona
Minister of Youth, Sports and Culture	Patricia Wiskies
Minister of Information and Communication Technology	Shadrick Namalomba
Minister of Lands, Housing and urban Development	Jappie Mhango
Minister of Defence	Chimwemwe Chipungu
Deputy Minister of Homeland Security (Operations)	Norman Chisale
Deputy Minister of Gender, Children, Disability and Social Welfare	Martha Mzomera Ngwira
Deputy Minister of Education, Science and Technology	Francis Foley

== Cabinet as of 1 January 2025 ==
A new cabinet was appointed on 1 January 2025. This was followed by the resignation of Agnes Nyalonje in February 2025 and the subsequent dismissal of Sosten Gwengwe.

Office	Minister
Minister of Finance and Economic Affairs	Simplex Chithyola Banda
Minister of Foreign Affairs	Nancy Tembo
Minister of Agriculture	Samuel Kawale
Minister of State and Public Service Delivery	Michael Usi
Minister of Local Government, Unity and Culture	Richard Chimwendo Banda
Minister of Justice	Titus Mvalo
Minister of Homeland Security	Ezekeil Peter Ching'oma
Minister of Health	Khumbize Kandodo Chiponda
Minister of Trade and Industry	Vitumbiko Mumba
Minister of Youth and Sports	Uchizi Mkandawire
Minister of Basic and Secondary Education	Madalitso Wirima Kambauwa
Minister of Higher Education	Jessie Kabwila
Minister of Transport and Public Works	Jacob Hara
Minister of Mining	Ken Zikhale Ng'oma
Minister of Tourism	Vera Kamtukule
Minister of Gender	Jean Muonawauza Sendeza
Minister of Labour	Peter Dimba
Minister of Defense	Monica Chang'anamuno
Minister of Water and Sanitation	Abida Sidik Mia
Minister of Energy	Ibrahim Matola
Minister of Lands	Deus Gumba
Minister of Information and Digitization	Moses Kunkuyu
Minister of Natural Resources and Cimate Change	Owen Chomanika
Deputy Minister of Health	Noah Chimpeni
Deputy Minister of Local Government, Unity and Culture	Joyce Chitsulo
Deputy Minister of Agriculture	Benedicto Chambo
Deputy Minister of Foreign Affairs	Patricia Kainga
Deputy Minister of Gender	Halima Daud
Deputy Minister of Water and Sanitation	Liana Chapota

== Cabinet as of 31 January 2023 ==
A new cabinet was appointed on 31 January 2023.

Office	Minister
Minister of Finance and Economic Affairs	Simplex Chithyola Banda
Minister of Foreign Affairs	Nancy Tembo
Minister of Agriculture	Samuel Kawale
Minister of Natural Resources and Climate Change	Michael Usi
Minister of Local Government, Unity and Culture	Richard Chimwendo Banda
Minister of Justice	Titus Mvalo
Minister of Homeland Security	Ken Zikhale Ng'oma
Minister of Health	Khumbize Kandodo Chiponda
Minister of Trade and Industry	Sosten Gwengwe
Minister of Youth and Sports	Uchizi Mkandawire
Minister of Education	Madalitso Wirima Kambauwa
Minister of Transport and Public Works	Jacob Hara
Minister of Mining	Monica Chang'anamuno
Minister of Tourism	Vera Kamtukule
Minister of Gender	Jean Muonawauza Sendeza
Minister of Labour	Agnes Makonda Nyalonje
Minister of Defense	Harry Mkandawire
Minister of Water and Sanitation	Abida Sidik Mia
Minister of Energy	Ibrahim Matola
Minister of Lands	Deus Gumba
Minister of Information and Digitization	Moses Kumkuyu
Deputy Minister of Local Government, Unity and Culture	Owen Chomanika
Deputy Minister of Health	Halima Alima Daud
Deputy Minister of Education	Nancy Chaola Mdooko
Deputy Minister of Water and Sanitation	Liana Kakhobwe Chapota

== See also ==
- Malawian past cabinets
