= Deus (disambiguation) =

Deus is the Latin word for "god" or "deity".

Deus or deus may also refer to:

== Arts and entertainment ==
=== Fictional entities ===
- Deus, in the video game Xenogears
- Deus, in the manga series Angelic Layer
- Deus, in the manga series Future Diary

=== Music ===
- Deus (band), a Belgian rock band
- "Deus", a song by The Sugarcubes from the 1988 album Life's Too Good
- "Deus", a song by B'z from the 2019 album New Love

=== Other uses in arts and entertainment ===
- Deus (board game), a civilisation board game from 2014
- Deus (video game), a 1997 video game
- Deus (film), a 2022 science-fiction film starring Claudia Black
- Deus (TV series), an Israeli sci-fi thriller series (2008–2010)

== People ==
- Deus Gumba, a Malawian politician and educator (fl. 2023)
- Deus Mkutu, a Malawian footballer (born 1991)

== Other uses ==
- DeuS, a Belgian beer by Bosteels Brewery
- Deus Automobiles, the manufacturer of Deus Vayanne

== See also ==
- Zeus, the sky and thunder god in ancient Greek religion
- Deus Ex, a series of role-playing video games
- Deus ex machina (disambiguation)
- Dei (disambiguation)
