= Sameer Suleman =

Malawian politician

The Right Honourable Sameer Suleman

Speaker of the National Assembly
- Incumbent
- Assumed office 29 October 2025
- President: Peter Mutharika
- Preceded by: Catherine Gotani Hara

Member of the National Assembly for Blantyre City Chigumula BCA Club Banana Constituency
- Incumbent
- Assumed office 27 October 2025
- President: Peter Mutharika

Member of the National Assembly for Blantyre City South East Constituency
- In office 2019–2025
- President: Peter Mutharika (2019–2020); Lazarus Chakwera (2020–2025)

Personal details
- Party: Democratic Progressive Party
- Occupation: Politician, businessman

Sameer Suleman is a Malawian politician who has served as Speaker of the National Assembly of Malawi since 2025 and as a Member of Parliament since 2019. He represents the Democratic Progressive Party (DPP) and was the Chairperson of the Parliamentary Committee on Agriculture and Food Security. Suleman has been known for his outspoken approach to parliamentary debates and his criticism of government expenditure and agriculture policy. In October 2025, the DPP nominated him as its candidate for Speaker of the National Assembly.

== Political career ==
Sameer Suleman was elected to the Malawi National Assembly representing Blantyre City South East Constituency under the DPP.

As Chairperson of the Parliamentary Committee on Agriculture, he has frequently commented on the government's Affordable Inputs Programme (AIP). In 2024, he criticised the Ministry of Agriculture for what he described as “secrecy and poor accountability” in the implementation of the AIP. in 2024, Suleman also called for the resignation of the Minister of Agriculture, Sam Kawale, accusing him of incompetence and failure to manage the AIP effectively.

In addition, he has raised public concern about the adequacy of Malawi's maize reserves, warning that the country risked food shortages if stocks were not replenished. He has also accused authorities of politicising maize distribution, urging for fair and transparent management of food security programs.

Suleman was elected Speaker of the National Assembly of Malawi in October 2025 following a parliamentary vote held after the general elections. Upon his election, he pledged to uphold the Constitution and improve the functioning of Parliament to better serve Malawians.

== Controversies and legal challenges ==
In January 2025, Sameer Suleman was granted bail by a court in Blantyre after being charged with criminal defamation. The charges stemmed from statements he allegedly made on social media between December 2024 and January 2025, targeting politicians including Richard Chimwendo Banda, Baba Steve Malondera, and Ken Zikhale Ng'oma.

In September 2025, the Minister of Higher Education, Jessie Kabwila, filed a K500 million defamation lawsuit against Suleman, citing remarks he made during a DPP rally. Suleman dismissed the claim as “laughable” in interviews with the media.

In the same year, Minister of Homeland Security Ken Zikhale Ng’oma also filed a K1.5 billion defamation claim, accusing Suleman of publishing false and defamatory information on social media.
