= Machina =

Machina may refer to:

- Machina (band), a rock and metal band
- Machina (magazine), Polish music magazine
- Machina, Nigeria, a Local Government Area in Yobe State
- Machina/The Machines of God, a 2000 album by The Smashing Pumpkins
- Machina II/The Friends & Enemies of Modern Music, another 2000 album by The Smashing Pumpkins
- Mark J. Machina (born 1954), American economist
- Queen Machina, one of the main villains from Power Rangers Zeo
- An earlier title for Elephants Dream, a Blender 3D animated short film
- A machine-based weapon in Baten Kaitos Origins
- A powered machine in Final Fantasy X
- The Machina, a non-player faction in Ingress

== See also ==
- Ex Machina (disambiguation)
- Deus ex machina (disambiguation)
- Vox Machina (disambiguation)
