= Ministry of Agriculture (Malawi) =

Government ministry of Malawi

- Tumbuka: Unduna wa vya Chuma; Chichewa: Unduna wa za Chuma

Ministry overview
- Jurisdiction: Government of Malawi
- Headquarters: Lilongwe, Malawi; 13°59′S 33°47′E
- Annual budget: MWK. 60 billion (2016, recurrent)
- Minister responsible: Minister of Agriculture
- Ministry executive: Samuel Kawale
- Child agencies: ADMARC; Department of Agriculture; Department of Agricultural Development; Institute of Post‐Harvest Technology; Malawi Council for Agricultural Research Policy

The Ministry of Agriculture is the central government ministry of Malawi responsible for agriculture. The ministry has the responsibility of formulating and implementing national policy on agriculture-related matters and other subjects which come under its purview. The current Minister of Agriculture is Samuel Kawale.

== Key objectives ==
The key objective of the Ministry of agriculture is to:

- Established food and nutrition security,
- Stable prices for agricultural products,
- Timely implementation of projects, Increase production in selected crops,
- Efficient and effective implementation of accelerated food production programme,
- Efficient and effective use of foreign funds,
- Customer friendly and result oriented administrative system,
- Results-based management in entire government sector.
- Supportive agricultural policy for food and allied agricultural crops,
- Efficiently coordinated paddy purchasing and marketing programme

== See also ==
- Minister of Agriculture (Malawi)
