= Francis Foley =

Francis Foley may refer to:

- Francis B. Foley, American ferrous metallurgist
- Francis Foley (athlete), English athlete
- Francis Foley (politician), Malawian politician and Deputy Minister of Education, Science and Technology
- Frank Foley, British Secret Intelligence Service officer
