= Aspark Owl =

Japanese electric sports car

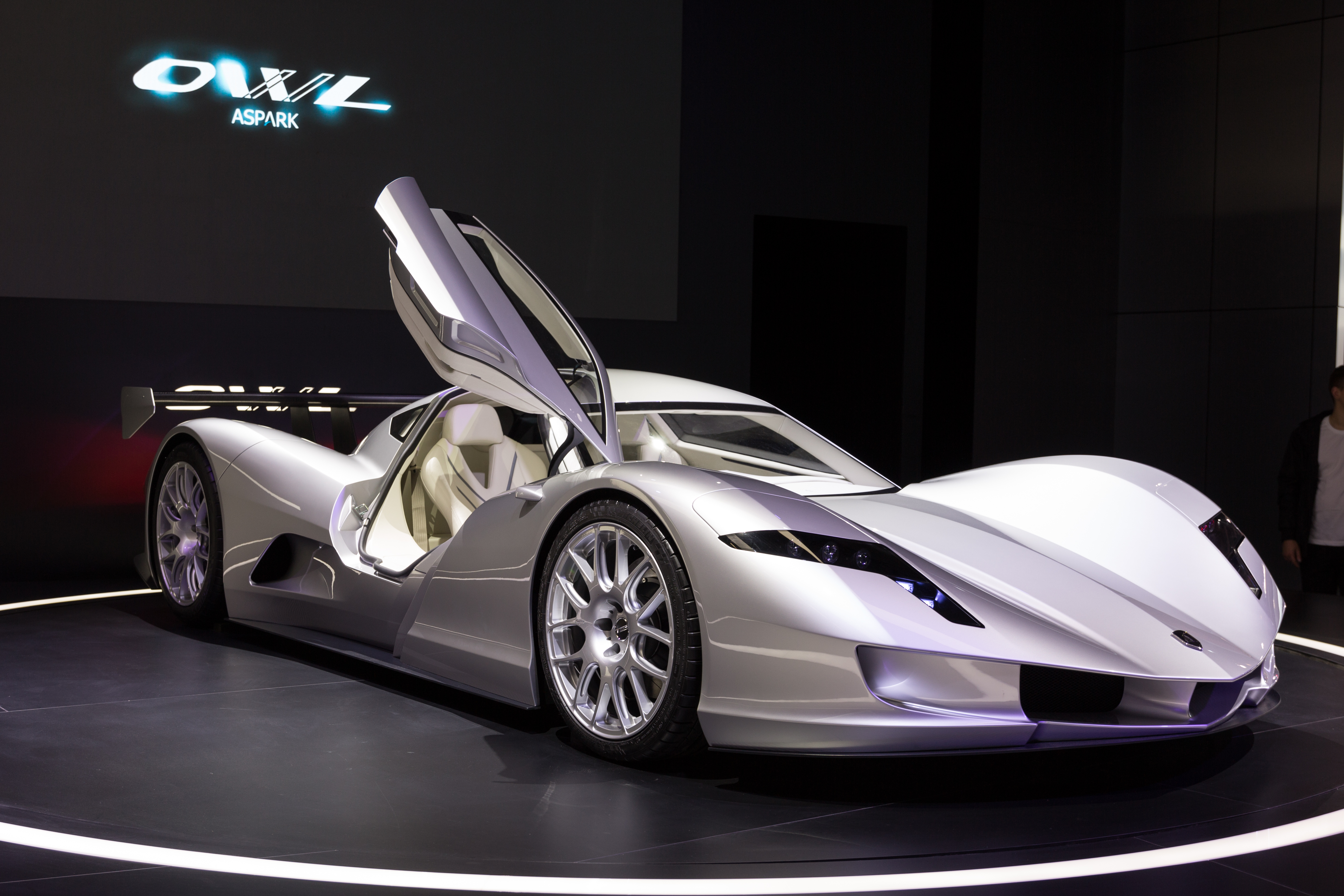
- Aspark Owl concept at the 2017 IAA

Overview
- Manufacturer: Aspark Co; Manifattura Automobili Torino
- Production: 2017 (Concept); 2019 (Prototype); 2020 - 2024 (Production)
- Model years: 2021

Body and chassis
- Class: Sports car (S)
- Body style: 2-door coupé
- Layout: Quad motor, individual wheel drive
- Doors: Dihedral

Powertrain
- Electric motor: 4 electric motors (two rear, two front)
- Power output: 1,953 hp (1,456 kW; 1,980 PS); 2,000 N⋅m (1,475 lb⋅ft)
- Battery: 69 kWh (248 MJ) lithium-ion
- Electric range: 451 km (280 mi)

Dimensions
- Length: 4,791 mm (188.6 in)
- Width: 1,914 mm (75.4 in)
- Height: 910 mm (35.8 in)
- Kerb weight: 2,000 kg (4,409 lb)

The Aspark Owl (Japanese: アスパーク・アウル) is an all-electric battery-powered sports car designed by Japanese engineering firm Aspark, under development since 2018, with the goal of making the fastest accelerating electric car. It is built by Manifattura Automobili Torino (MAT) in Italy. Aspark planned a production run of 50 vehicles, each with a list price of €2.5 million. The Owl was publicly unveiled in concept form at the 2017 Frankfurt Auto Show, and the production version was unveiled in November 2019 at the Dubai International Motor Show.

== Specifications and performance ==
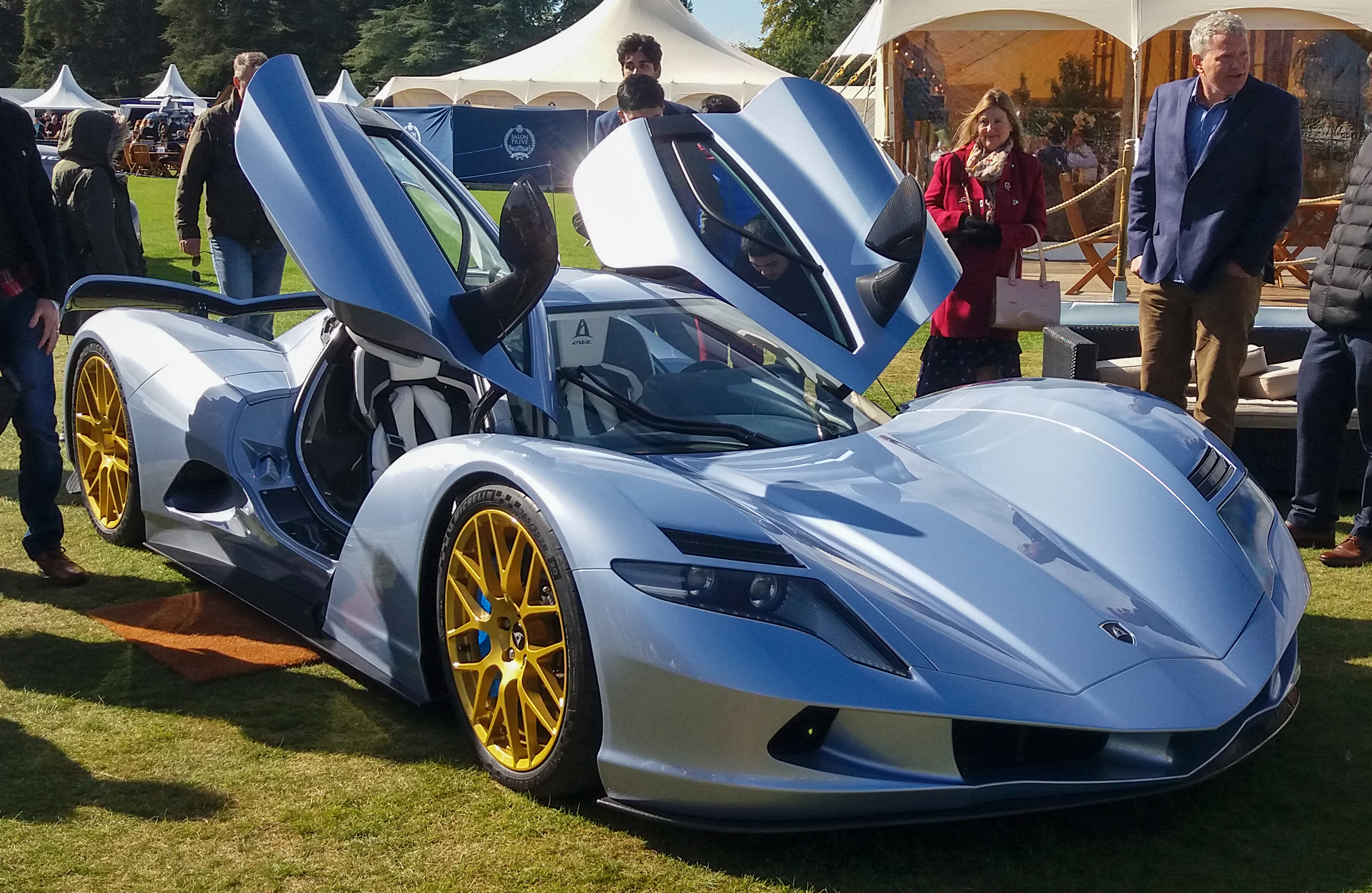
Production version

The Owl has carbon fibre body work built around a carbon fibre monocoque chassis weighing 120 kg (265 lb). A stainless steel support structure is incorporated in the roof to increase the bodywork's strength. Changes to the bodywork from the concept include the addition of wing mirrors, an active rear wing and a redesigned rear glass. The car features double wishbone suspension with hydraulic dampers and torque vectoring for improved handling. Stopping power is handled by a carbon-ceramic braking system with 10-piston front calipers and 4-piston rear calipers.

It has been claimed that the Owl can accelerate from 0-100 km/h (62 mph) in 1.72seconds, 0-186 mph (300 km/h) in 10.6 seconds, and can attain a top speed of 413 km/h (257 mph), which would make it the fastest accelerating production car in the world. The car is claimed to have a range of approximately 250 miles and is said to take 40 minutes to fully charge. In June 2024, a newer version called "SP600" reached a claimed top speed of 438.7 km/h (273 mph), beating the previous fastest EV, the Rimac Nevera. This record in turn was beaten in August 2025 by a BYD Yangwang U9 Track Edition, which reached 472.41 km/h (293.54 mph).

== Gallery ==
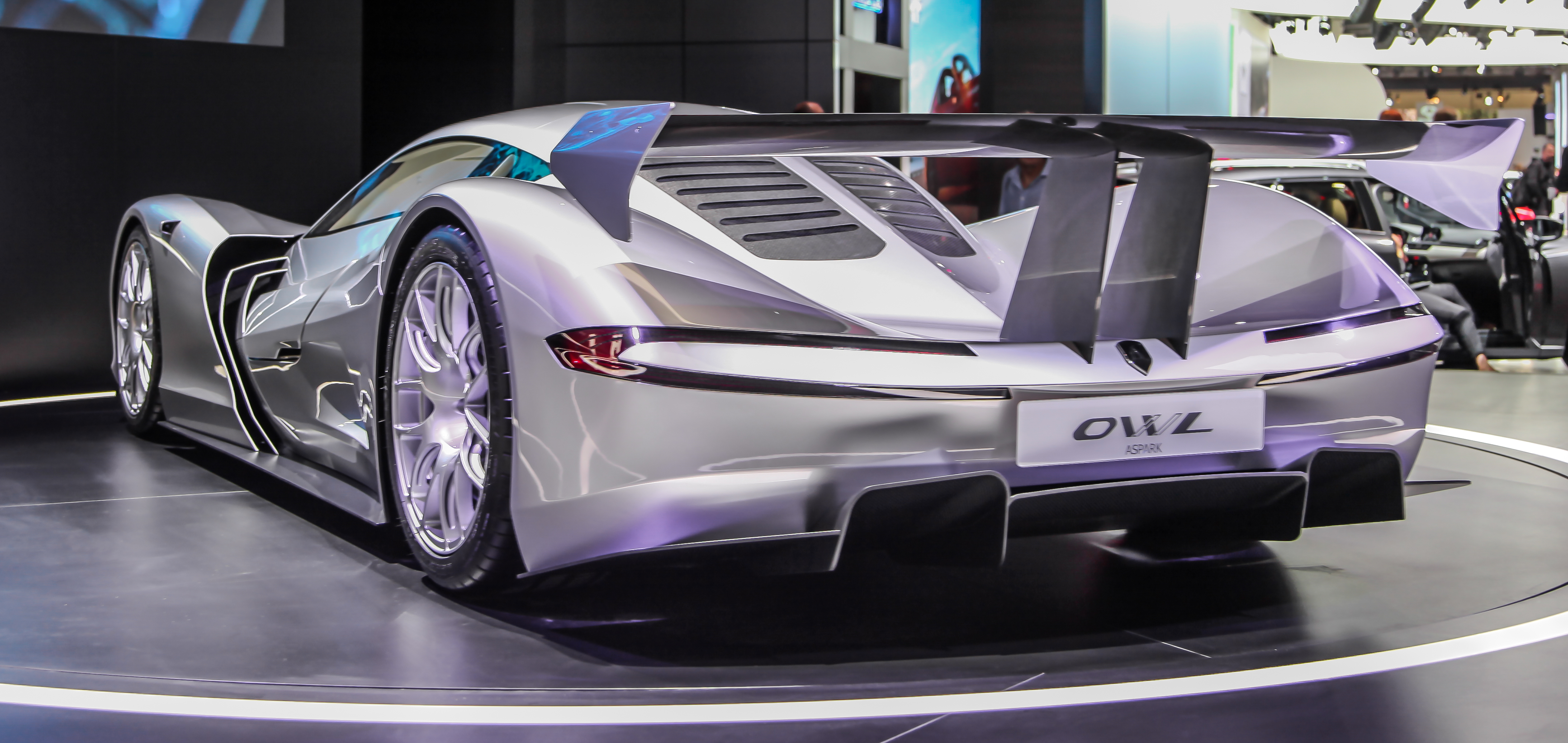
Rear view

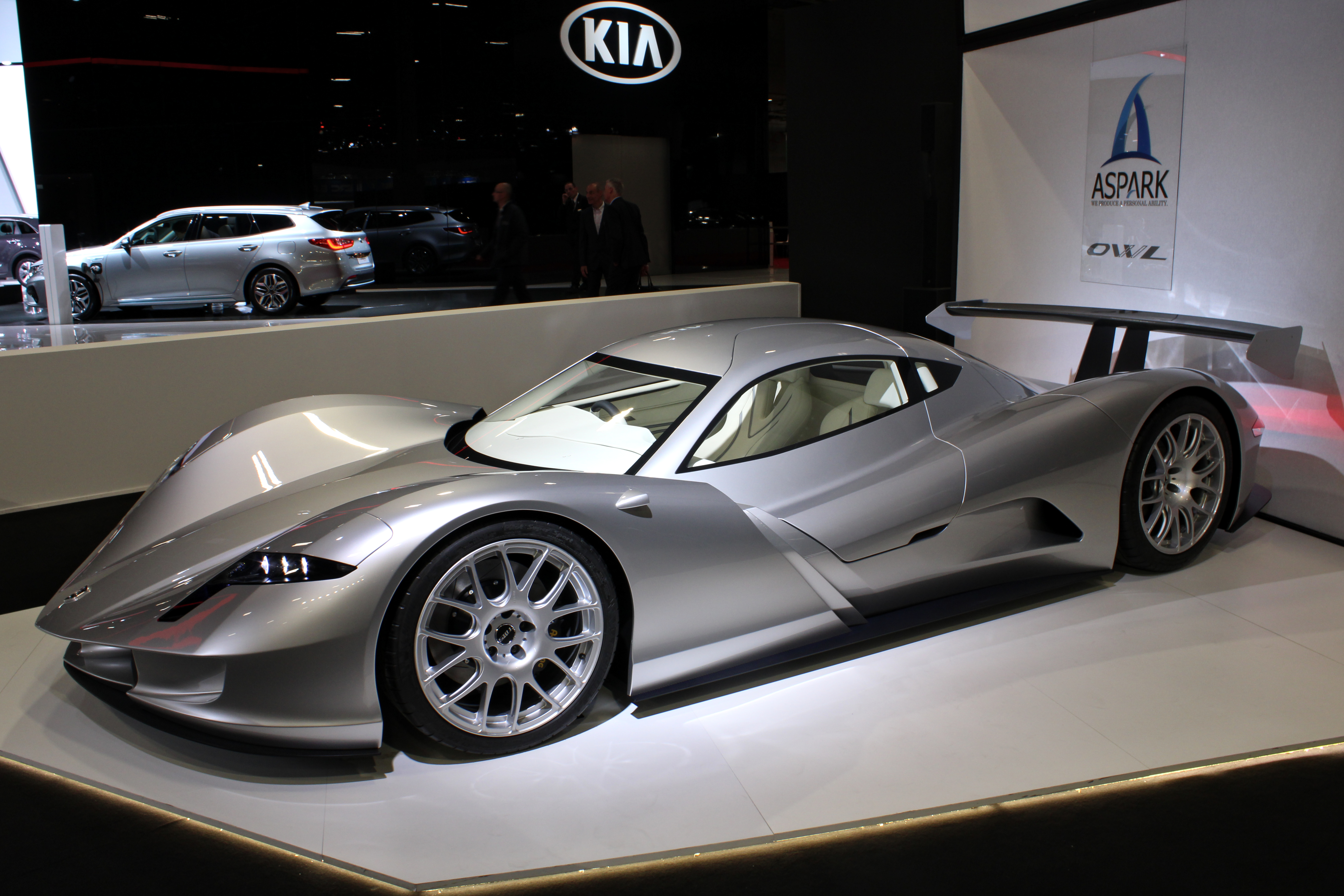
Side view

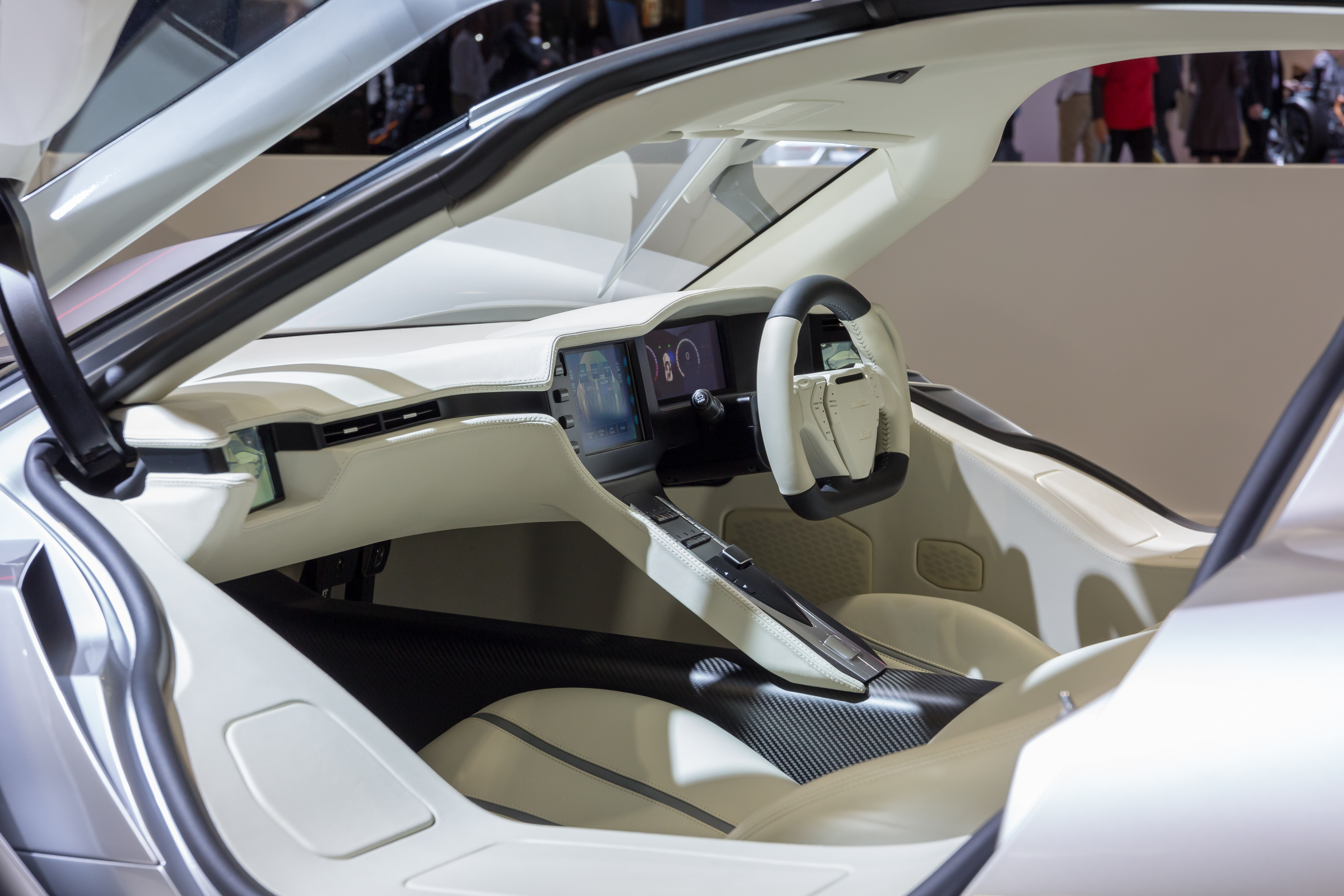
Interior view

== See also ==
- Nio EP9
- Tesla Roadster (second generation)
- Rimac Concept One
- Rimac Nevera
- Deus Vayanne
- Hyundai N Vision 74
- List of production cars by power output
