= Zinenani =

Zinenani can be a feminine given name or a middle name. Notable people with the name include:

- Zinenani Majawa, Malawian sex worker and activist
- Grace Zinenani Maseko, Malawian politician
