= Ebbie Mathanda =

Ebbie Mathanda is a Malawian politician who is also the Member of Parliament for Mulanje Pasani Constituency. Since 2025, she has been the Vice Chairperson of Malawi's Tobacco Commission

== Early life ==
Mathanda was born in Chilanga village, Traditional Authority Nkanda, in Mulanje District. She is married and Christian, specifically from the CCAP Blantyre Synod.

== Political life ==
Ebbie Mathanda's political journey started as early as 1999, when she contested the 1999 Malawian general election on the United Democratic Front (UDF) ticket. She won the seat comfortably with 24,997 votes, a majority of 22,162 over her nearest rival. She won the same constituency again in the 2004 election, though with a reduced vote (7,093) and majority (3,150), and remained a Member of Parliament for Mulanji Pasani until 2009.

In the 2009 election Mathanda lost the constituency, coming third in the vote. Thereafter, she took a sabbatical leave from active political life.

Mathanda's former seat was taken by Angie Kaliati, who was the husband of another local MP Patricia Kaliati. Mathanda contested the seat again in 2019 after she beat Angie Kaliati in the primary elections.

== Career and political life ==
Mathanda was on the SADC Observer Mission between 1999 and 2004. Between 2004 and 2009 she was also a member of the SADC Parliamentary Committee on TB, Malaria & HIV/AIDS, the Women's Caucus; Transport and Public Works; Health; and the SADC Parliamentary Committee.

Mathanda is Vice Chairperson of the Board and Chairperson of the Technical Committee of the Tobacco Commission (TC), a position she has been holding since 12 September 2025. Trees are consumed as firewood during tobacco curing. In February 2026 she revealed plans for the commission to plant 43,000 pine, blue gum and fruit trees covering 20 hectares. The 2025 tobacco harvest was over 221 m kg (221,000 tonnes). but asked for further government support for afforestation. The Minister of Agriculture, Irrigation and Water Development, Roza Fatch Mbilizi noted that planting trees help, but they need to be protected as they grow. Roza thanked tobacco growers for their work.
