= Manifattura Automobili Torino =

Italian coachbuilder

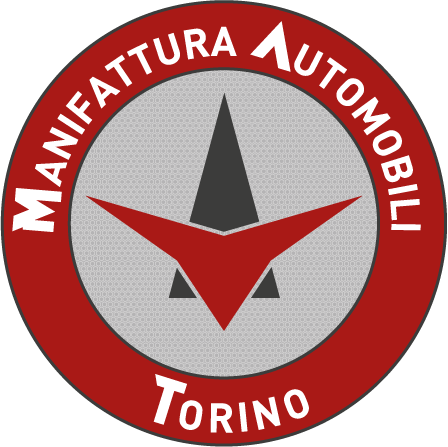

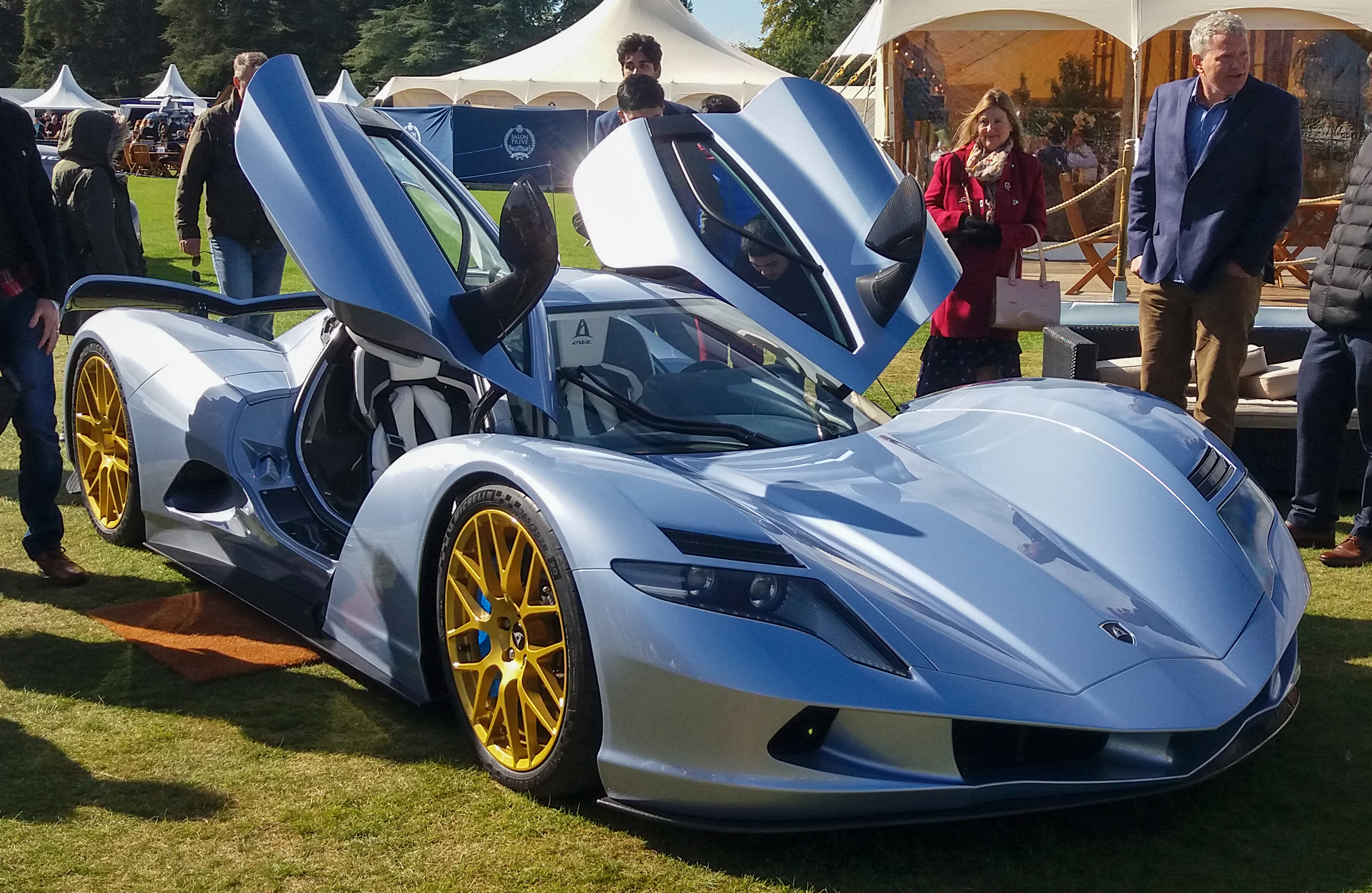
- The 2020 Aspark Owl, designed and constructed by M.A.T.
- Type: Private
- Industry: Automotive
- Founded: 2014
- Headquarters: Rivalta di Torino (Piedmont), Italy
- Area served: world wide
- Products: Automobiles
- Owner: Paolo Garella
- Website: manifatturaautomobilitorino.com

Manifattura Automobili Torino or M.A.T. is an Italian company, active in the automotive bodywork sector, founded in Turin on 21 October 2014 as Società a responsabilità limitata, by Paolo Garella, after his departure from Pininfarina.

The deed of incorporation into the company was signed by the partners Paolo Garella and Paolo Griot; M.A.T., in addition to the design and consultancy services, is engaged in the production of the New Stratos, a new edition of Lancia Stratos, in factory of Rivalta di Torino.

== History ==
M.A.T. is an automotive company that designs, develops and manufactures luxury cars and one off vehicles. The first projects were the SCG003C & S, the Apollo Intensa Emozione and the Devel Sixteen.

In January 2018, production of 25 New Stratos was launched, presenting the vehicle at the Geneva Motor Show that same year. The New Stratos project was born in 2010, when the German entrepreneur Michael Stoschek commissioned Pininfarina to reissue the Lancia Stratos, made with the intention of keeping faith with the original project. The 2010 New Stratos was a custom built around the chassis of the Ferrari F430 Scuderia, suitably shortened and equipped with the same 540 HP V8 engine for a weight of 1,247 kilograms (2,749 lb). The project was personally followed by Paolo Garella, who took it with him to M.A.T. Thanks to an agreement with Stoschek, the New Stratos is now in limited production.

In December 2018, M.A.T. signed an agreement with the Japanese manufacturer Aspark for the development and final construction of the Aspark Owl electric supercar. From the year of its foundation, the craft activity consisting of design to construction on commission, takes place in the factory located in Rivalta di Torino.

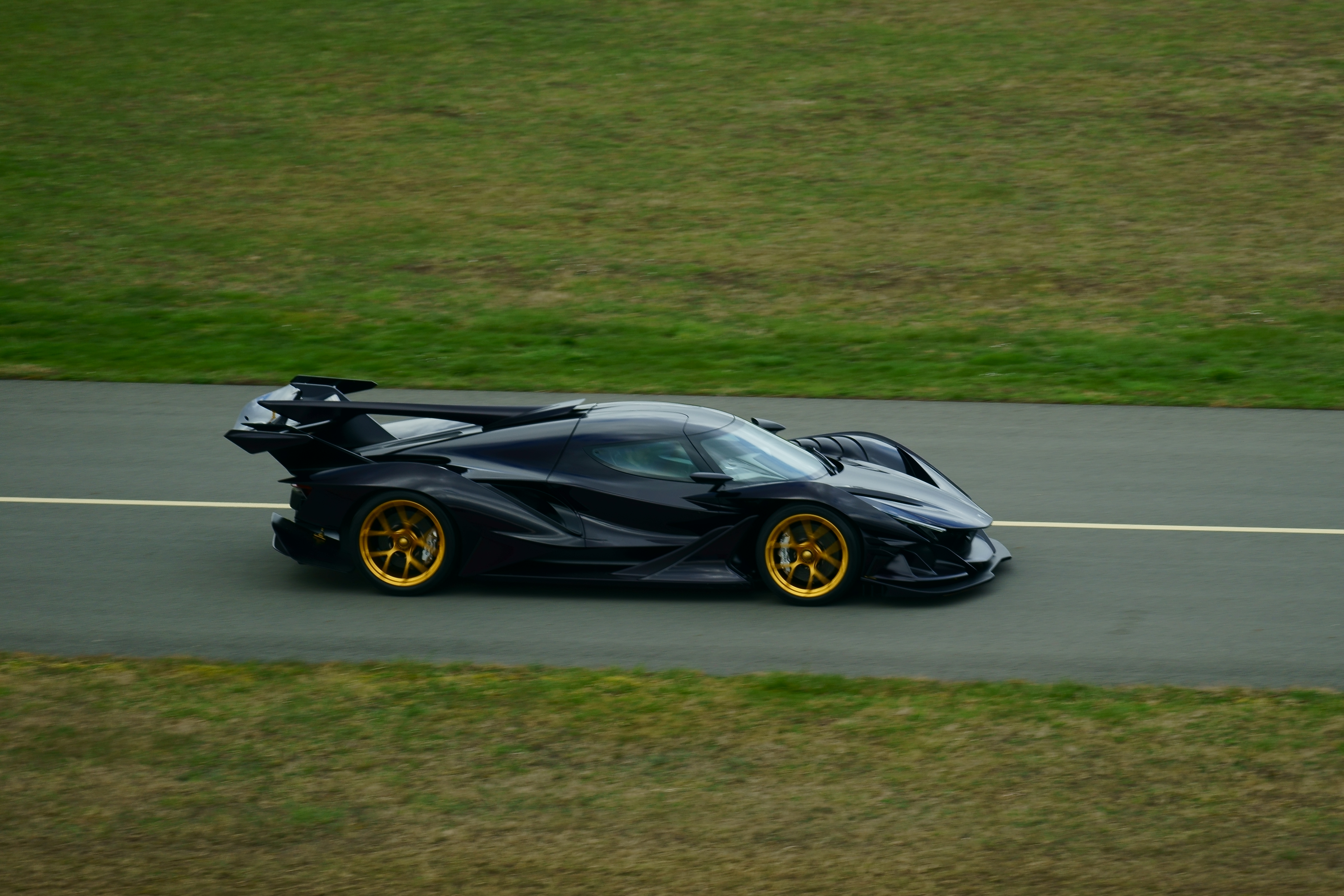
Apollo IE on track

== Produced cars ==
- SCG003C (2014–2017)
- SCG003S (2016–2017)
- Apollo Intensa Emozione (2017)
- Devel Sixteen (2017)
- New Stratos (2018)
- Aspark Owl (2019–2020)
- Jewelry (2022)
- ZeroACento 273 Potenza (2022)
- Oldbac Kalana (2023)
- Aspark Owl SP600 (2024)
