= Zomba Changalume Constituency =

Malawian electoral constituency

- First-past-the-post constituency for the Parliament of Malawi
- District: Zomba
- Region: Southern Region

Current constituency
- Party: DPP
- Member: Grace Zinenani Maseko

Zomba Changalume Constituency is a constituency for the National Assembly of Malawi, located in the Zomba District of Malawi's Southern Region. It is one of the 10 constituencies in the district that elects one member of parliament by the first past the post system. The constituency has several wards, all electing councilors for the Zomba District.

In 2025, the member of parliament who represented the constituency was Grace Zinenani Maseko.

== Members of parliament ==
Elections	MP	Party	Notes	References
1999	Anne Mary Fletcher	UDF		
2004	John J.A. Chikalimba	IND		
2009	Grace Zinenani Maseko	DPP		
2014	John Alfred John Chikalimba	PP		
2019	John Alfred John Chikalimba	PP		
2025	Feston Kaupa	DPP		
