= Ex Machina =

Ex Machina is a portion of the phrase deus ex machina, meaning "god from the machine". It may refer to:

== Fiction ==
- Ex Machina (comics), a comic book series by Brian K. Vaughan and Tony Harris
- Ex Machina (Star Trek), a 2004 Star Trek novel by Christopher L. Bennett

== Films ==
- Appleseed Ex Machina, a 2007 anime film and the sequel to the 2004 film Appleseed
- Ex Machina (film), a 2014 British science fiction film

== Music ==
- Ex Machina, a 1998 EP by American surf rock group Man or Astro-man?
- Ex machina (group), German music group
- "Ex Machina", a 2025 song by South Korean K-pop artist Yves
- ”Ex-Machina”, a song by A Skylit Drive from Wires...and the Concept of Breathing, 2008

== Other uses ==
- Ex Machina (role-playing game), a post cyberpunk role-playing game
- Ex Machina (theatre company), a theatre company founded by director Robert Lepage in Quebec City, Canada

== See also ==
- Deus ex machina (disambiguation)
