= Dei =

Dei, dei, or DEI commonly refers to:

- DEI, an abbreviation for diversity, equity, and inclusion
- Dei, the genitive singular of deus, the Latin word for "god" or "deity"

Dei, dei, or DEI may also refer to:

== Businesses and organizations ==
- Dale Earnhardt, Inc., a former NASCAR team, now a museum
- Directed Electronics, Inc., an American manufacturer of vehicle security systems
- Public Power Corporation (Greek: Dimosia Epicheirisi Ilektrismou), a Greek electric power company in Greece
- Senckenberg German Entomological Institute, formerly German Entomological Institute (German: Deutsches Entomologisches Institut), an entomological research institute in Germany

== Other uses ==
- Darrell Edward Issa, a U.S. representative from California
- DEI (Dabney Eats It), the motto of Dabney House at California Institute of Technology
- Dei Rural LLG, a local government in Papua New Guinea
- Benedetto Dei, an Italian poet and historian (1417–1492)
- Destroy Erase Improve, a 1995 extreme metal album by Meshuggah
- Doofenshmirtz Evil Incorporated, a fictional company in the Phineas and Ferb animated TV series
- Divide et impera, also known as "divide and conquer"
- Demisa language (ISO 639-3 code: dei)
- Dutch East Indies, Dutch colony in Indonesia

== See also ==
- Deus (disambiguation)
