= Ben Phiri =

Malawian politician and minister

Minister of Local Government and Rural Development
- Incumbent
- Assumed office October 30, 2025
- President: Peter Mutharika
- Preceded by: Richard Chimwendo Banda

Personal details
- Party: Democratic Progressive Party
- Education: A senior Research Fellow in global Health communication Leadership at the University of Southern California Institute on Inequalities in Global Health,
- Occupation: Politics and International Relations Expert

Ben Phiri is a Malawian politician who currently serves as minister of Local Government and Rural Development. He was appointed to the position by President Peter Mutharika in October 2025.

Phiri had discovered the village of Usisya in Malawi which he described as "a gem". He suggested that access by a 30 km road would be transformative on the village's economy. He suggested that a road to Mzuzu would improve both tourism and farming. He was on a training course in China and he cited local examples as a supporting argument.
