= Anne Mary Fletcher =

Hon. Mrs. Anne Mary Fletcher MP

Member of the National Assembly of Malawi for Zomba Changalume Constituency
- In office 1999–2004
- Succeeded by: John Chikalimba
- Majority: 9,906 (49.4%)

Personal details
- Born: 23 June 1957 (age 69)
- Party: United Democratic Front
- Spouse: Roy Thompson (divorced)
- Occupation: businesswoman, politician

Anne Mary Fletcher (born 1957) is a Malawian businessperson and politician. After travelling the world, she returned to Malawi in the 1980s and established a chain of lodges there. From 1999 to 2004 she served as a member of parliament for the Zomba Changalume constituency in Zomba district.

== Life ==
Anne Mary Fletcher was born on May 23, 1957, the sixth of ten children born to William Agson Fletcher (son of a Scot and a Yao) and Ruth Kuruneru Fletcher (daughter of a Sri Lankan and a Ngoni). She grew up in a village in the Changalume in Zomba District. She attended Malosa Secondary School from the age of ten to fourteen, and also attended St Mary's Secondary School, Zomba. She experienced racism from Black classmates for being mixed race.

Leaving school at eighteen, Fletcher worked as an accounts assistant and a bank clerk, also taking a secretarial course. She married a British economist, Roy Thompson, and moved with him to England. There she started studying nursing, working at Nether Edge Hospital. The couple's first child was born in England in 1976. The family moved to Papua New Guinea, where she worked as a manager for eight printing shops. Another child was born in 1981. Unhappy with what she felt was the violent culture of Papua New Guinea, the family moved to Solomon Islands, where their third child was born in 1985. Fletcher worked as a nurse, and continued nursing when they moved to Australia.

After an amicable divorce, Fletcher returned to Malawi. In 1986 she opened her first business, Annie's Coffee Shop in Lilongwe. In 1995 she opened Annie's Lodge, aimed at tourists visiting Lilongwe. She subsequently established lodges in other cities.

Encouraged by friends to run for parliament in the 1999 Malawian general election, Fletcher stood as a candidate representing the United Democratic Front for the Zomba Changalume constituency. She won the election with 13,652 votes, 68.1% of votes cast and a majority of 9,906 (49.4%) over her nearest rival. She did not stand again to contest the 2004 Malawian general election.
