= Mzimba Solora Constituency =

Malawian electoral constituency

- First-past-the-post constituency for the Parliament of Malawi
- District: Mzimba
- Region: Northern Region
- Major settlements: Ekwendeni

Current constituency
- Party: MCP
- Member(s): Patrick Akimu Mwanza

Mzimba Solora Constituency is a constituency for the National Assembly of Malawi, located in the Mzimba District of Malawi's Northern Region.

== Description ==
It is one of 13 constituencies in Mzimba District. It elects one Member of Parliament by the first past the post system. The constituency has 12 wards, all electing councilors for the Mzimba District. The constituency was represented by MP Gertrude Nya Mkandawire, in 2004. However, she withdrew as the DPP candidate complaining about abuse and corruption within the party. She stood as an independent, but was beaten by the DPP's replacement candidate, Patrick Akimu Mwanza, in the 2009 general election.

In the 2018 election Patrick Akimu Mwanza stood as an independent and he came third behind the MCP candidate Jacob Hara.

== Members of parliament ==
Elections	MP	Party	Notes	References
2004	Gertrude Nya Mkandawire	PETRA	Multi-party system	
2009	Patrick Akimu Mwanza	DPP	Multi-party system	
2018	Jacob Hara	Malawi Congress Party	Multi-party system	
