= Shadrick Namalomba =

Malawian politician and minister

Minister of Information and Communication Technology
- Incumbent
- Assumed office October 30, 2025
- President: Peter Mutharika
- Preceded by: Moses Kunkuyu

Personal details
- Party: Democratic Progressive Party
- Occupation: Accountant

Shadrick Namalomba is a Malawian politician who currently serves as minister of Information and Communication Technology. He was appointed to the position by President Peter Mutharika on 30 October 2025.

In March 2026 he was the leader of the house and he was commentating on the scandal surrounding the purchase of the Amaryllis Hotel by a civil service pension fund at an over inflated price. The current party was blaming the party of the former administration, although it was expected that some officials were also involved.
