= Usisya =

- Usisya Community Hall

- Location in Malawi
- Coordinates: 11.2°S 34.17°E
- Country: Malawi
- Region: Northern Region
- District: Nyonga Bay District
- Time zone: +2
- Climate: Aw

Usisya is a village on the northern shore of Lake Malawi in Traditional Authority Mbwana. Access is primariily by boat.

== Traditional Authority ==
Senior Chief Mbwana has an office here. In 2020 the then senior chief, Francis Nyirenda, died from COVID-19. He was said to be the first Malawian traditional Authority to die from the virus. Poor facilities and communication was considered to have contributed to his death. The best radio at the time came from Tanzania who were in denial about the pandemic.

== Transport ==
Access by road is difficult and it requires a 4x4 in the rainy season. Politicians rarely visit and the health centre is said to be only a building. It has been suggested by the minister of Local Government and Rural Development in 2026 that access by road would transform the village's economy. The minister Ben Phiri had discovered Usisya which he described as "a gem". He raised this suggestion while visiting China. He suggested that a 30 km road to Mzuzu would improve both tourism and farming and he cited local examples as a supporting argument.

It is possible to catch a ferry from Likoma Island each week. The MV Ilala calls every week as it travels from the north to the south end of Malawi and on its return journey.

== Notable residents ==
The politician Kanyama Chiume was born here in 1929.

== Education ==
Missions provided education here after David Livingstone visited. The children gained a basic education and this helped to create migrant workers and union members. Kanyama Chiume went on to enter politics after starting his primary education here. He became the Minister of Education. His birthplace was destroyed in the 1960 by Malawi Young Pioneers.

Usisya has a secondary school whose head teacher is Richard John Gondwe (in 2024). In 2024 new classrooms were built that allowed class sizes to be reduced to 50 children per class.
