= Alfred Gangata =

Malawian politician and businessman

Alfred Ruwan Gangata

Minister of Youth, Sports and Culture
- Incumbent
- Assumed office 30 January 2026
- President: Peter Mutharika
- Preceded by: Patricia Wiskies

Minister of Natural Resources
- In office 5 January 2026 – 30 January 2026
- President: Peter Mutharika
- Preceded by: Jean Mathanga
- Succeeded by: Patricia Wiskies

Minister of State
- In office 5 October 2025 – 5 January 2026
- President: Peter Mutharika

Member of Parliament for Lilongwe City Mtandire‑Mtsiriza Constituency
- Incumbent
- Assumed office 25 November 2025
- President: Peter Mutharika

Personal details
- Born: 2 October 1988 (age 38) Kachipeya Village, Dedza
- Party: Democratic Progressive Party
- Occupation: Politician, businessman
- Known for: Vice President of Central Region (DPP); legal cases

Alfred Ruwan Gangata is a Malawian politician and businessman. He served as Minister of State from 2025 to 2026, was Minister of Natural Resources in early 2026, and has served as Minister of Youth, Sports and Culture since January 2026. He has also been the Member of Parliament for Lilongwe City Mtandire–Mtsiriza Constituency since 2025.

== Early life and career ==
Gangata was born in Dedza District in 1988. He is the founder and Managing Director of Master Security Services, a private security company operating in Malawi. He has expanded his business portfolio to include multiple ventures under the Masters Group, such as Fredlines General Dealers, Self Made Import and Export, Sellers of Farm Produce, and Concrete Constructions.

== Political career and Education ==
=== Political career ===
In February 2024, Gangata was appointed as the Democratic Progressive Party's Vice President for the Central Region, succeeding Zeria Chakale. His appointment followed Chakale's departure from the party.

In the September 2025 parliamentary election for the Lilongwe City Mtandire‑Mtsiriza Constituency, Gangata stood as the candidate for the Democratic Progressive Party. Unofficial results at the tally centre indicated that he received 12,289 votes, narrowly ahead of his nearest rival, who received 12,284 votes. Following complaints about the handling of void ballots, the Malawi Electoral Commission declared the election null and void and scheduled a by-election. However, he took the case to court seeking the release of the official results. On 10 November, the court ruled in his favour directing the electoral commission to announce the outcome based on the original tally sheets. On 20 November, the commission formally declared Gangata the winner of the Lilongwe Mtandire–Mtsiriza parliamentary seat.

In October 2025, Gangata was appointed as a Minister of State in the cabinet of President Peter Mutharika. In January 2026, President Mutharika carried out a cabinet reshuffle that abolished the Ministry of State. Gangata was moved from his position as Minister of State and appointed Minister of Natural Resources. About three weeks later, he made further cabinet changes, transferring Gangata from the Ministry of Natural Resources to serve as Minister of Youth, Sports and Culture.

In December 2025, Gangata launched Kabaza Day, a national initiative to honour victims of motorcycle taxi (Kabaza) accidents and to raise awareness about road safety. The event in Lilongwe brought together government officials, health professionals, and kabaza operators, and aimed to balance recognition of the role of kabaza transport with efforts to promote safer riding practices.

=== Education ===
Gangata holds a degree in Business Administration from the University of Lilongwe.

== Legal issues ==
=== Tax clearance forgery ===
In January 2025, Gangata was arrested by the Malawi Revenue Authority (MRA) on charges of falsifying tax records, forgery, uttering a false document, and conducting transactions without a valid tax clearance certificate. He was granted bail with conditions, including a K1 million cash bond and fortnightly reporting to the MRA.

=== Fraudulent MSCE certificate ===
In March 2025, Gangata was arrested by the Malawi Police Service over allegations of possessing a fraudulent Malawi School Certificate of Education (MSCE) certificate from Chitowo Community Day Secondary School in Dedza District. Investigators alleged that he was neither a student there nor did he sit the examination.

A witness testified that he had sat the MSCE exams on Gangata's behalf in 2017, claiming he was promised a house, a car, and K4 million, but received nothing.

=== Procurement controversy ===
In December 2025, the Malawi Revenue Authority issued a notice of intent to award multi-billion-kwacha security service contracts to Master Security Services, a company associated with Gangata. This prompted public debate and criticism on social media about potential conflicts of interest, given Gangata’s roles in government and ongoing legal matters involving the company’s tax compliance. It stated that the notice was part of a standard public procurement process. It later cancelled the planned award of the contract following public criticism and stated that the tender would be re-advertised.

== Public profile ==
Gangata is an active figure in Malawian politics, known for his public support of the Democratic Progressive Party. He has stated his intention to lead the party in the 2030 elections.
