= Mulanje Pasani Constituency =

Malawian electoral constituency

- First-past-the-post constituency for the Parliament of Malawi
- District: Mulanje
- Region: Southern Region

Current constituency
- Member: Ebbie Mathanda

Mulanje Pasani Constituency is a constituency for the National Assembly of Malawi, located in the Mulanje District of Malawi's Southern Region. It is one of the nine constituencies in the district that elects one member of parliament by the first past the post system. The constituency has several wards, all electing councilors for the Mulanje District.

Ebbie Mathanda's former seat was taken by Angie Kaliati in 2014. Mathanda contested the seat again in 2019 after she beat Angie Kaliati in the primary elections.

In 2026, the member of parliament who represented the constituency was Ebbie Mathanda.

== Members of Parliament ==
Elections	MP	Party	Notes	References
1994				
1999	Ebbie Mathanda	UDF		
2004	Ebbie Mathanda	UDF		
2009	Liviton Namaona	DPP		
2014	Angie Kaliati	DPP		
2019	Ebbie Mathanda	DPP		
2025	Ebbie Mathanda	DPP		
