= Lobin C. Lowe =

Malawian politician

Lobin C. Lowe was Malawi's Minister of Agriculture from 8 July 2020 to 25 October 2022.

== Life ==
Lowe became the elected member of parliament representing Lilongwe Central Constituency in the parliament in 2009.

The President Lazarus Chakwera named Lowe as the minister and Agnes Nkusa Nkhoma as a deputy minister for Agriculture in his first cabinet in 2020. In 2022 he and his deputy Madalitso Wirima Kambauwa were fired as minister by the President. They had paid for a large quantity of fertiliser without the required checks. Before being relieved from his ministerial duties, Lowe was also relieved as parliamentary committee chairperson of the heavily politicized and unsustainable Affordable Input Subsidy Program (AIP).
