= Henry Mumba =

Malawian politician

Deputy Minister of Information, Communications and Tourism of Malawi
- In office 6 June 2004 – 8 March 2009
- President: Bakili Muluzi

Personal details
- Born: Malawi
- Party: United Democratic Front (Malawi)

Henry Mumba is a Malawian politician and educator. He was the former Deputy Minister of Information, Communications and Tourism in Malawi, having been appointed to the position in early 2004 by the former president of Malawi Bakili Muluzi. His term began in June 2004.

Mzimba Hora's MP Christopher Ngwira was not able to stand in the 2019 elections because the Supreme Court had declared him to be a bankrupt. Mumba was chosen as the replacement DPP candidate, but his name was withdrawn by the DPP and Christoper's wife, Martha Mzomera Ngwira, was chosen. However the electoral commission would not allow Mumba's name to be withdrawn so the DPP had more than one candidate, but they favoured Martha.

In 2025 he was again chosen to contest the Mzimba Hora Constituency. The Malawi Congress Party announced his candidature in March 2025.

Awards and achievements
Preceded by	Minister of Information, Communications and Tourism of Malawi	Succeeded by
