= Gertrude Nya Mkandawire =

Malawian politician

- Occupation: politician
- Known for: member of the National Assembly in 2004
- Successor: Patrick Akimu Mwanza
- Political party: PETRA, DPP and Independent

Gertrude Nya Mkandawire is a Malawian politician, she was a member of the National Assembly in 2004 for the People's Transformation Party. She was then in the Democratic Progressive Party and she withdrew in the 2008 election's primaries because of the abuse and demands for bribes from party members. She stood as an independent (and unsuccessful) candidate in that constituency.

== Life ==
Mkandawire was the People's Transformation Party's candidate for the Mzimba Solora Constituency in the 2004 elections. She was one of thirteen candidates and she was elected and joined Malawi's National Assembly. There were about 30,000 votes and she took over a quarter of them.

She was a candidate in the 2009 elections again in the Mzimba Solora Constituency. There were reports of insults and stone throwing against women candidates in the elections. Mkandawire was reported to have withdrawn from the primary elections. She complained that insulting songs were sung and she was jostled by voters and her posters were destroyed. She noted that other candidates said that they were "sharing the wealth" as they handed out blankets, food and cash to potential voters. She was standing as a DPP candidate and she said that the party's committee members were among those expecting her to pay them for their support. The party had demanded, before she stood, that in the event of standing down she would support the replacement DPP candidate. She argued that this was an assurance that would apply only in a fair election.

She stood as an independent but the electorate did not vote for her in sufficient numbers. Patrick Akimu Mwanza was the successful candidate and he had over ten times her number of votes.
