= Aspark =

Japanese company

Aspark Co., Ltd.
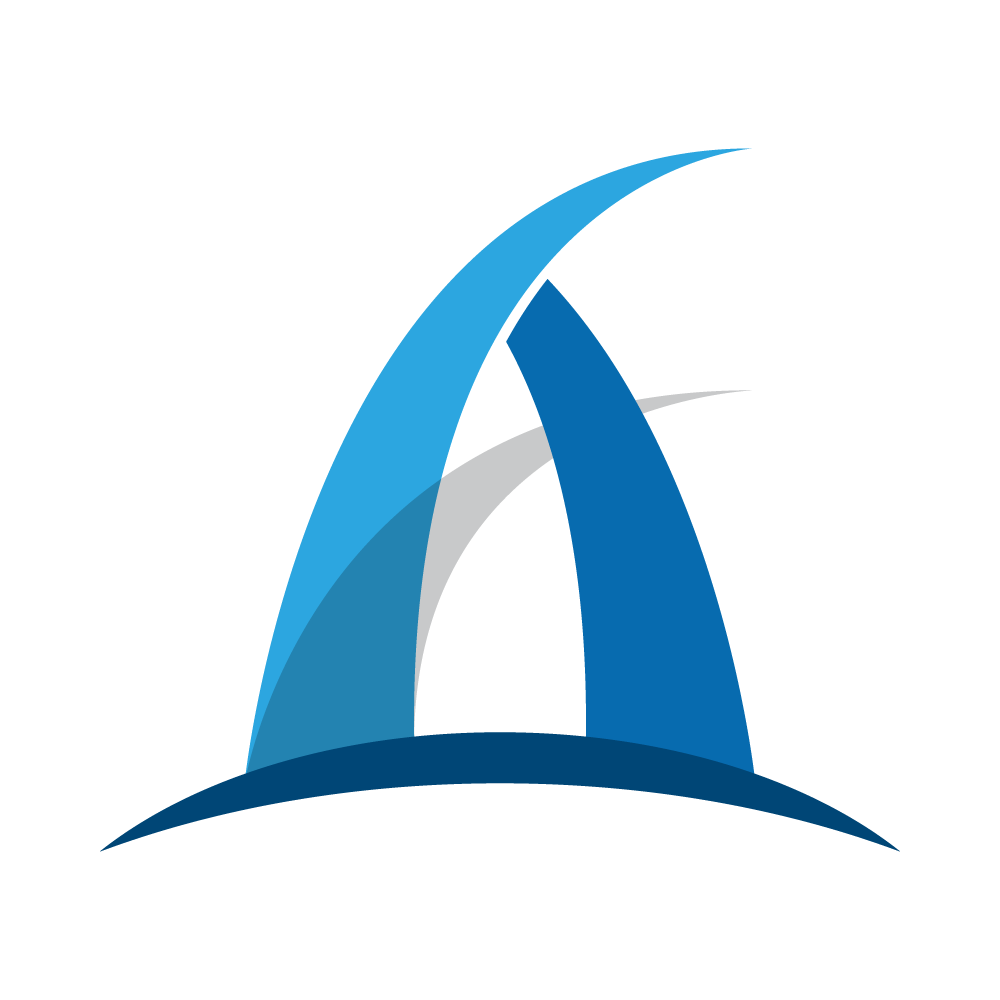
- Trade name: Aspark
- Native name: 株式会社アスパーク
- Romanized name: Asupāku kabushiki gaisha
- Type: Kabushiki gaisha
- Industry: Automotive
- Founded: October 2005; 21 years ago
- Headquarters: Kita-ku, Osaka, Osaka, Japan
- Key people: Masanori Yoshida (President)
- Website: asparkcompany.com

Aspark Co., Ltd. is a Japanese company centered on technical, chemical, and medical worker dispatching as well as electric vehicles. It is well known for the all-electric sports car Aspark Owl.

== History ==
Aspark was founded in October 2005 by Japanese businessman Masanori Yoshida in Osaka. In the following years, the company focused on offering engineering services for the automotive industry, as well as for the heavy industry and the electronics industry. By May 2019, Aspark had grown to 25 offices worldwide, employing 3,500 people and generating a turnover of US$160 million.

In the mid-2020s, Aspark began work on an electric supercar, aimed at offering record performance (less than 2 seconds to 100 km/h (62 mph)) with the possibility of moving the vehicle in traffic. After the presentation of the pre-production prototype at the 2017 Frankfurt Motor Show, the official premiere of the serial Aspark Owl took place in November 2019 during the Dubai International Motor Show.

Production of Owl on behalf of Aspark by the Italian partner Manifattura Automobili Torino began in Turin in 2020. The manufacturer describes Owl as the fastest-accelerating car in the world.

== Vehicles ==
- Aspark Owl
