= Mzimba Hora Constituency =

Malawian electoral constituency

- First-past-the-post constituency for the Parliament of Malawi
- District: Mzimba
- Region: Northern Region

Current constituency
- Party: MCP
- Member: Khumbize Kandodo Chiponda

Mzimba Hora Constituency is a constituency for the National Assembly of Malawi, located in the Mzimba District of Malawi's Northern Region. It is one of 13 constituencies in Mzimba District that elects one Member of Parliament by the first past the post system. The constituency has 7 wards, all electing councilors for the Mzimba District. The constituency was represented by MP, Christopher Mzomera Ngwira, but he was accused of theft.

Christopher Ngwira was not able to stand in the 2019 elections because the Supreme Court had declared him to be a bankrupt. Henry Mumba was chosen as the replacement DPP candidate but his name was withdrawn by the DPP and Christoper's wife, Martha Mzomera Ngwira, was chosen. However the electoral commission would not allow Mumba's name to be withdrawn so the DPP had more than one candidate, but they favoured Martha.

At the 2025 election, a lot of Mzimba's member's of parliament were not re-elected. The three that were included Martha Munthali who represented this constituency.

== Members of parliament ==
| Elections | MP | Party | Notes | References |
|---|---|---|---|---|
| 2009 | Christopher Mzomera Ngwira | DPP (Former member of PP) | Multi-party system | |
| 2019 | Martha Mzomera Ngwira | DPP | Multi-party system | |
| 2025 | Martha Munthali | DPP | Multi-party system | |
