= Christopher Ngwira =

Malawian politician

Deputy Minister of Lands, Housing and Urban Development of Malawi
- In office 8 September 2011 – 8 June 2017
- President: Bingu wa Mutharika

Personal details
- Born: Malawi
- Party: Democratic Progressive Party (Malawi)

Christopher Mzomera Ngwira is a Malawian politician and educator. He was the former Deputy Minister of Lands, Housing and Urban Development in Malawi, having been appointed to the position in early 2011 by the former president of Malawi, Bingu wa Mutharika after he sacked his previous 42 strong cabinet. Ngwira's term began on 19 August 2011.

Ngwira was not able to stand in the 2019 elections because the Supreme Court had declared him to be a bankrupt. In 2019 Henry Mumba was chosen as the DPP candidate to represent Mzimba Hora but his name was withdrawn and his wife, Martha Mzomera Ngwira, was chosen. However the electoral commission would not allow Mumba's name to be withdrawn so the DPP had more than one candidate, but they favoured Martha.

Awards and achievements
Preceded by	Deputy Minister of Lands, Housing and Urban Development of Malawi	Succeeded by
