= Midvale Steel =

Steel-making corporation located in Pennsylvania

Coordinates: 40°00′50″N 75°09′57″W

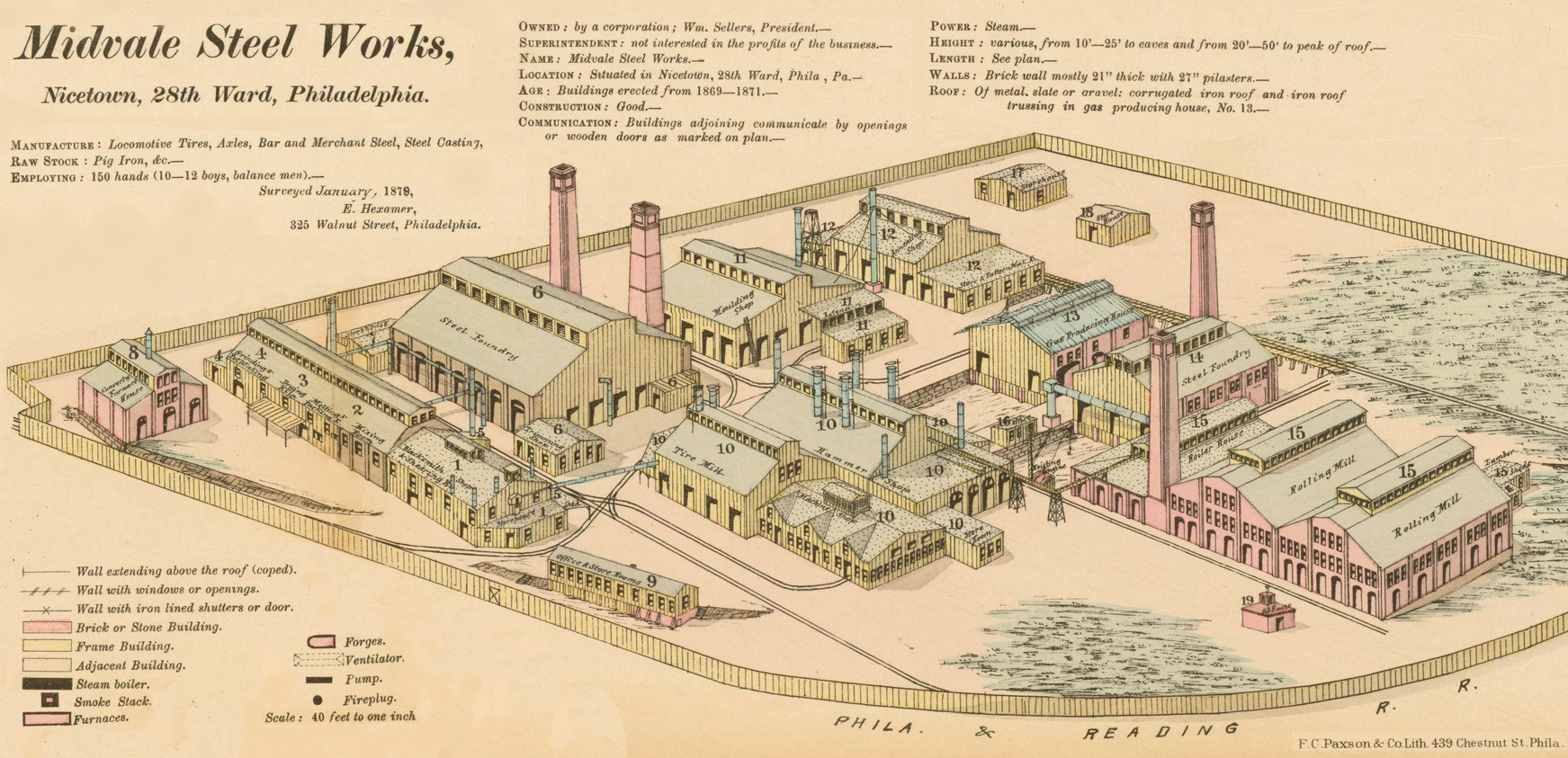
Midvale Steel Works aerial view, 1879

Midvale Steel was a succession of steel-making corporations whose flagship plant was the Midvale Steel Works in Nicetown, Philadelphia, Pennsylvania. The mill operated from 1867 until 1976.

In the 1880s, Frederick Winslow Taylor rose through the ranks at Midvale, from lathe operator, to gang boss, to engineer, to chief engineer of the works. During this time he developed the core of his philosophy of scientific management.

== Overview ==
Midvale produced high-quality steels (including many alloy steels) and the casting, forging, and machining needed to use them in special applications such as heavy artillery (naval, coastal, and field); steam turbines; naval armor plate; and pressure vessels for use in chemical plants (for example, petroleum refineries). Midvale also helped pioneer the steel formulas used in the early automotive industry.

Midvale was never a particularly large company (relative to giants such as Carnegie, Bethlehem, and U.S. Steel), and the flagship Nicetown plant was, in the management's own words, "never a 'tonnage' plant". That is, unlike larger steelmakers, they did not measure their success in terms of the sheer tonnage they could manage to produce per year. Midvale's niche in the steel industry was defined early on by a scientific approach to metallurgy during the transitional era when steelmaking gradually transformed from black art to applied science. Even after the rest of the industry caught up in terms of that transition, Midvale continued for decades to maintain a niche for itself in the area of the market defined by high quality, research and development, and special applications.

== History ==
The company began in 1867 as the William Butcher Steel Works. The products that founders William Butcher, Jr. (a son of the founder of W. & S. Butcher Steel Works, a scion of the Sheffield, England steel industry) and Philip Syng Justice (an American manufacturer) planned to produce were cast-steel locomotive tires (that is, in British spelling, tyres) and cast-steel forgings, with a plan to make eventually a promising new product: steel rails, which would be far superior to older iron ones. At about this time in nearby Bethlehem, the predecessor company of Bethlehem Steel was also getting into the steel rail business. The Nicetown site was chosen because plenty of the anthracite coal that moved by river, canal, and rail from northeast Pennsylvania passed by Nicetown on its way to Port Richmond. Anthracite was superior to bituminous coal for steelmaking. Nicetown's proximity to one of the principal locomotive-building plants of the western hemisphere, the Baldwin Locomotive Works (which at the time was just a few rail-served miles away in the Spring Garden neighborhood), was another benefit of the site.

Midvale began with the crucible process, but two years after its founding began using the open-hearth process, which would in time replace the crucibles. The company's early years were rocky. Eventually, a principal investor, the quiet but immensely influential American engineer and businessman William Sellers, forced out Butcher, whose adherence to the idea of steelmaking as an obscure art of secret recipes did not serve him well when his recipes did not turn out right and he was unable to analyze why. With Butcher gone, Sellers renamed his erstwhile-namesake steel works the Midvale Steel Works. Kanigel states that the name reflected the fact that Midvale was roughly equidistant from the Schuylkill and Delaware rivers; however, if accurate, this etymology was fanciful, because a look at a map of Philadelphia shows that the plant, at Wissahickon and Roberts Avenues, was actually much closer to the Schuylkill. Perhaps the emphasis was that it was not directly on either river (as might usually be expected of a steelworks), but between them. In 1872, Sellers brought in a Yale-trained chemist with a talent for organization named Charles Augustus Brinley, who used applied science to straighten out the steelmaking formulas and processes, along the way analyzing and salvaging the scrap that had accumulated during Butcher's tenure.

Brinley hired Russell Davenport, a fellow Yale chemist, to be his assistant. Brinley, Davenport, and Sellers led Midvale to a period of prosperity. By the Centennial Exposition in 1876, they "were making Midvale into a company as congenial to a scientific approach to industrial problems as could be found anywhere in America".

It was in the 1880s that Frederick Winslow Taylor rose through the ranks at Midvale, from lathe operator, to gang boss, to engineer, to chief engineer of the works. During this time he developed the core of his philosophy of scientific management, which later became enormously influential (and often controversial) throughout the field of industrial engineering. Other notable people who worked for Midvale Steel or in close cooperation with it include Henry Gantt, James Buchanan Eads, Theodore Cooper, and Francis B. Foley. Charles E. Brinley, president of Baldwin Locomotive Works during the World War II era, appears to have been the son of Charles A. Brinley, Midvale's metallurgical leader.

Besides the railroad industry, one of the most important client industries for Midvale became armaments. During the late 19th and early 20th centuries, among many American steel companies, Bethlehem Steel and Midvale Steel especially, became the Krupps of the Americas. (In fact, they built their armament businesses largely on offering the U.S. War Department domestic alternatives to buying from Krupp.) An influential product of theirs since the 1910s and constantly improved through the 1930s was the Midvale Unbreakable capped armor-piercing projectiles for warships. Their innovation attempts at armor-making were less successful.

== Timeline ==
Year range	Formal company name	Notes
1867–1872	William Butcher Steel Works	1867: Butcher and Justice found the steelworks (History detailed below)
1872–1880	Midvale Steel Works	1872: Sellers forces Butcher out, hires Brinley, starts Midvale's tradition of applied science
1880–1915	Midvale Steel Company	1880: Reorganized under new name, but same management
1915–1923	Midvale Steel and Ordnance Company	1915: The heyday of trusts may be over, but huge financial interests still have plenty of power over big industry (railroads, oil, steel, etc.). A new company buys practically all the stock of the old company; with the ownership change also come management changes, and acquisitions of steel companies at Johnstown, Coatesville, and Eddystone
1923–1956	Midvale Company	1923: Bethlehem Steel Company acquires all of Midvale Steel and Ordnance Company except the flagship Nicetown plant, which will be run by the new "Midvale Company"
1956–1976	Midvale-Heppenstall Company	1956: Heppenstall Steel Company of Pittsburgh merges with Midvale Company to become Midvale-Heppenstall Company
1976		Nicetown plant is closed
1980s		Nicetown plant is demolished
circa 2000		SEPTA bus depot and maintenance facility built on former site of Nicetown plant
present	Heppenstall-Midvale AG	Heppenstall-Midvale AG of Switzerland continues to incorporate the Heppenstall and Midvale names

== Sources ==
- Kanigel, Robert (1997), The One Best Way: Frederick Winslow Taylor and the Enigma of Efficiency, Viking, ISBN 978-0-670-86402-7.
- Midvale Company (1942), The Seventy-fifth Anniversary of the Midvale Company. Midvale 1867–1942, Philadelphia: Midvale Company .
- Morris, Stephanie A., ed. (1987), The Franklin Institute and the Making of Industrial America: Guide to the Microfiche Collection (PDF), Bethesda, MD, USA: CIS Academic Editions, Congressional Information Service, Inc.
