= Uchizi Mkandawire =

Politician in Malawi

- Born: Uchizi Mkandawire; 1977 (age 48–49); Malawi
- Occupations: Educator; Activist; politician
- Successor: Patricia Wiskies as minister

Uchizi Mkandawire (born 1977) is a Malawian politician and educator who was the Minister of Youth and Sports in Malawi from 2014. He was the Member of Parliament for the Karonga Constituency until 2025. In that years election he achieved over 3,000 votes which was much less than the People's Party candidate, Duncan Kaonga, who had over 17,000 votes.

== Personal life ==
Uchizi Mkandawire was born in 1977 in Karonga, Malawi. He attended Karonga Secondary School. He has a master's degree in Public Policy and Administration.

Awards and achievements
| Preceded by | Minister of Youth and Sports of Malawi | Succeeded by Patricia Wiskies |
