= Harry Mkandawire =

Malawian politician

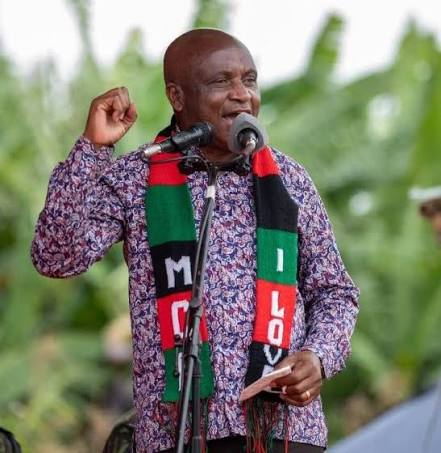

Minister of Defense of Malawi
- In office January 31, 2023 – October 30, 2025
- President: Lazarus Chakwera
- Succeeded by: Chimwemwe Chipungu

Personal details
- Born: Malawi
- Party: Malawi Congress Party

Harry Mkandawire is a Malawian politician and educator. He was the Minister of Defense of Malawi and he served from January 31, 2023, until October 30, 2025, having been appointed to the position in early January 2023 by the current president of Malawi Lazarus Chakwera. His term began on January 31, 2023.

Awards and achievements
Preceded by	Minister of Defense of Malawi	Succeeded by
