= Grace Zinenani Maseko =

Malawian politician

Grace Zinenani Maseko,
- Known for: Member of Parliament for Zomba Changalume Constituency and Minister of Local Government and Rural Development
- Political party: People's Party
- Other political affiliations: Democratic Progressive Party

Grace Zinenani Maseko is a Malawian politician who served as a minister in the cabinet of Malawi between 2012 and 2014. Maseko served as a member of parliament for the Zomba Changalume constituency in Zomba district, Malawi from 2009 to 2014.

== Political career ==
Grace Zinenani Maseko was a member of parliament for the Zomba Changalume constituency in Zomba district in southern Malawi. Maseko contested in the 2009 Malawi general elections as a Democratic Progressive Party (DPP) candidate and won the election. After Bingu Muntharika's death in 2012 while president, the Vice president, Joyce Banda, led Malawi as president. Joyce Banda left the ruling DPP and started her own party, the People’s Party (PP). Grace Maseko joined the newly formed PP party. Maseko was withdrawn from the SADC Parliamentary Forum after leaving the DPP.

Maseko became Minister of Local Government and Rural Development in Joyce Banda’s government.
