= Ibrahim Matola =

Malawian politician

Minister of Energy
- In office 30 January 2022 – 15 September 2025
- President: Lazarus Chakwera
- Preceded by: Newton Kambala
- Succeeded by: Jean Mathanga
- In office 2012–2014
- President: Joyce Banda

Member of Parliament Mangochi, North Makanjira
- In office 2004–2009

Member of Parliament Mangochi North Makanjira
- In office 2009–2014

Personal details
- Born: Ibrahim; 2 March 1972 (age 54) Mangochi
- Party: Peoples Party
- Education: Maddina University (Political Science); UOL (Masters)
- Profession: Businessman

Ibrahim Matola is a Malawian politician (born 2 March 1972), who served as the Minister of Energy in the Office and Cabinet of Malawi between 2022 and 2025. Matola previously served as the chairman of the southern region water board after being appointed by the President.

== National assembly ==
As the leader of the UDF in the National Assembly, Matola has criticized the government for ignoring the concerns of the minority parties. Though the UDF was the governing party from 1994 to 2004, it currently the second largest opposition party with only fifteen out of the one hundred ninety four seats in the National Assembly. He has expressed concern that Malawi is returning to a one–party system. He has been vocally critical of the leadership of the majority Democratic Progressive Party, accusing them of "raping the country". During some particularly contentious debates, such as the debate regarding whether to change the Flag of Malawi, Matola has participated in walkouts of minority party members.

During debates in the National Assembly he has clashed with George Chaponda. Matola has criticized Chaponda's record while serving with the UDP.

He has traveled to the European Parliament in Brussels and to the Parliament of the United Kingdom in Westminster for the International Parliamentary Seminar.

== Political positions ==
Matola has advocated for the rights of farmers in Malawi. He has also raised concerns that freedom of the press in Malawi is being threatened.

Matola has repeatedly clashed with the national chairman of the UDF, Friday Jumbe. He led the UDF legislatures in a vote of no confidence in Jumbe and the election of George Nga Ntafu to replace him.

Matola has also criticised the 2011 Local Courts bill, arguing that it would provide too much power to local chiefs and could devolve into a "draconian system".
