= Agness Nkusa Nkhoma =

Malawian parliamentarian

Agness Nkusankhoma
- Born: Mchinji, Malawi
- Occupation: deputy minister
- Known for: Deputy minister for agriculture

Agness Nkusankhoma or Agnes Nkusa Nkhoma is a Malawian parliamentarian in Malawi who has served as the deputy minister of Agriculture and from 2022, she was deputy minister of Gender, Community Development & Social Welfare. She lost her seat in the 2025 Malawian general election.

== Life ==
Nkusankhoma was born in the village of Nkhwazi in Mchinji where she went to Nkhwazi primary school.

Nkorma had a difficult education where she had to retake exams to get to Thyolo Secondary School. When she was nineteen she became pregnant and she married due to parental pressure. She was married for eleven years but she was determined to complete her education. She took evening classes at the local school for boys and finally passed the Malawi School Certificate of Education.

She was head-hunted and chosen to be a parliamentary candidate and she stood unsuccessfully for the Mchinji South Constituency in 2009. Ten years later she decided to try again and she was elected, with over 5,000 votes, to the same constituency. President Lazarus Chakwera named her as a deputy minister for Agriculture in his first cabinet in 2020 with Lobin C. Lowe as the minister for agriculture.

Nkorma is a member of the Malawi Parliamentary Women's Caucus which is led by Roseby Gadama in 2024. At the beginning of 2022 a new cabinet was announced which included Patricia Kaliati as the minister of Gender, Community Development & Social Welfare. Nkorna was not mentioned but a later list appeared, with an apology, and Nkorna named as Kaliati's deputy.

In October 2024, her boss, Kaliati was arrested and charged with "conspiring with others to commit a serious offence" amid rumours of a plot to assassinate President Lazarus Chakwera.

She stood in the 2025 Malawian General Election to represent the Mchinji South constituency and lost her seat.
