= Owen Chomanika =

Malawian politician

Minister of Natural Resources and Climate change
- Incumbent
- Assumed office January 6, 2025
- President: Lazarus Chakwera
- Preceded by: Micheal Usi

Personal details
- Born: Malawi
- Party: Malawi Congress Party

Owen Chomanika is a Malawian politician. He is the current Minister of Natural Resources and Climate Change in Malawi Malawi, having been appointed to the position in early January 2025 by the current president of Malawi Lazarus Chakwera. His term began on January 6, 2025.

Awards and achievements
Preceded by	Deputy Minister of Local Government, Unity and Culture of Malawi	Succeeded by
