= Mulanje District =

District of Malawi

Coordinates: 16°00′S 35°35′E

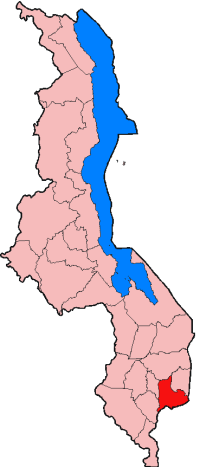
Location of Mulanje District in Malawi

Mulanje is a district in the Southern Region of Malawi. Its capital is Mulanje. The district covers an area of 2,056 km.² and has a population of 428,322. It is also known for its tea-growing industry and Mount Mulanje, one of the highest peaks in Southern Africa.

== Demographics ==
At the time of the 2018 Census of Malawi, the distribution of the population of Mulanje District by ethnic group was as follows:

- 82.8% Lomwe
- 11.0% Mang'anja
- 3.8% Yao
- 0.7% Chewa
- 0.6% Ngoni
- 0.4% Sena
- 0.3% Nyanja
- 0.2% Tumbuka
- 0.1% Tonga
- 0.0% Nkhonde
- 0.0% Lambya
- 0.0% Sukwa
- 0.3% Others

== Government and administrative divisions ==
There are nine National Assembly constituencies in Mulanje:

- Mulanje - Bale
- Mulanje - Central
- Mulanje - Limbuli
- Mulanje - North
- Mulanje - Pasani
- Mulanje - South
- Mulanje - South East
- Mulanje - South West
- Mulanje - West

At the 2009 election all of these constituencies have been held by members of the Democratic Progressive Party (DPP).

In 2019 the South East constituency was won by Naomi Phiri who stood as an independent and later supported the DPP.
