= Deus Mkutu =

Malawian footballer

Personal information
- Full name: Deus Alex Mkutu
- Date of birth: 19 April 1991 (age 35)
- Place of birth: Lilongwe, Malawi
- Height: 1.72 m (5 ft 8 in)
- Position: Forward

Team information
- Current team: Moyale Barracks

Senior career*
Years	Team	Apps	(Gls)
2011–	Moyale Barracks		

International career^{‡}
2015	Malawi	1	(0)
- * Club domestic league appearances and goals as of 1 August 2021 ‡ National team caps and goals as of 1 August 2021

Deus Mkutu (born 19 April 1991) is a Malawian football striker who currently plays for Moyale Barracks.
