= Vox Machina (disambiguation) =

Vox Machina is a fictional group of adventurers appearing in the Dungeons & Dragons web series Critical Role. Specifically it may refer to:

- Vox Machina, the first campaign of Critical Role which is centered on this adventuring party
- The Legend of Vox Machina, the animated series adaptation of Critical Role's first campaign
  - List of The Legend of Vox Machina characters, which lists the members of Vox Machina along with other characters

== Literature ==
- Critical Role: Vox Machina Origins, a comic book series that serves as a prequel to Critical Role's first campaign
- Critical Role: Vox Machina – Kith & Kin, a prequel novel focused on two members of Vox Machina
