= Francis B. Foley =

American ferrous metallurgist

- Born: July 7, 1887; Philadelphia
- Died: February 28, 1973 (aged 85); Coral Gables, Florida
- Occupation: Ferrous metallurgist

Francis B. Foley (July 7, 1887 – February 1973), was an American ferrous metallurgist.

== Biography ==
Foley was born July 7, 1887, in Philadelphia. His father, Dennis Foley, died in 1889 in Dakota Territory, leaving a wife, daughter, and three sons (one posthumous). Francis was enrolled in Girard College, a free boarding school, at that time limited to fatherless white boys, from which he graduated in 1904, after completing a high school education. He worked for a year in the art department of the Philadelphia North American, a daily morning newspaper.

In 1907, after working at other jobs, he was employed by the Midvale Steel Company of the Nicetown neighborhood of Philadelphia, from which his father had been laid off 21 years earlier. His first job was open hearth clerk for a melter. Foley was recognized as unusually capable by the head of the melting department, Radclyffe Furness, a Harvard-educated chemist, and educated himself in metallurgy and crystallography with Furness's encouragement. In 1912 he contracted tuberculosis, and spent two years in New Mexico and Arizona, where he was cured. In 1915 he married Anne Marie Flaherty, who bore a son, Gerard M. Foley, the following year.

Samuel Hoyt, of the University of Minnesota, in 1917 asked Furness to suggest someone to teach metallography at the University. The latter recommended Foley for the job, which led to the family moving to Minneapolis. After the U.S. entered World War I, Foley volunteered for the Army, but was rejected because of his medical history. He was then employed, first by the National Bureau of Standards and then by the U.S. Bureau of Mines. As a member of the National Research Council he evaluated the means by which ferro-manganese production could be increased, since a substantial proportion of the ferro-manganese used in steel production had been imported. From 1918 to 1924, he headed the iron and steel division of the Bureau of Mines, first at the Experiment Station at Minneapolis, and later in Pittsburgh, before returning to Minneapolis.

In 1921 he was detached to work with Henry Marion Howe at Howe's private laboratory in Westchester County, New York. Howe and Foley investigated the hardening of steel and the formation and tempering of martensite. Howe's resulting publication on this subject was significant in developing the understanding of this important art and science.

When he returned to Minneapolis he undertook a study of the blast furnace, collaborating with P.H. Royster in this project. He then supervised the Experiment Station on the campus of the Missouri School of Mines (now Missouri University of Science and Technology) in Rolla, Missouri. In 1924 he took the position of metallurgist for the Lucey Manufacturing Company in Chattanooga, Tennessee, and in 1926 returned to the Midvale Company, to organize and direct a new Research Department.

Midvale had a long history of producing high grade steel forgings and castings for guns, armor, locomotive tires, and large forgings, first from acid openhearth steel and later in electric furnaces. Foley kept Midvale successfully producing new corrosion resistant alloys, and alloys for use at high temperatures. In 1949 Midvale was merged with a Pittsburgh steel company. Foley felt that the new company would no longer be in the forefront of metallurgical development and resigned to take a position with the International Nickel Company. For a time he directed the research laboratory at Bayonne, New Jersey, and then served as consulting metallurgist in the New York City offices of Inco until 1957. He then joined Pencoyd Steel and Forge Corp. as executive metallurgical engineer, finally retiring in 1964, aged 77.

His first wife, Anne, died in June, 1936. In 1938 he married Katherine Campbell Fuller. In 1939 they had a daughter, Frances Campbell, later Mrs. William Jueds. He died in Coral Gables, Florida, om February 28, 1973.
