= Martha Mzomera Ngwira =

Malawian politician

Martha Ngwira
- Deputy Minister of Gender in 2026
- Occupation: politician
- Known for: Democratic Progressive Party politician for Mzimba Hora
- Predecessor: Christopher Ngwira
- Spouse: Christopher Ngwira

Martha Mzomera Ngwira is a Malawian Democratic Progressive Party politician for Mzimba Hora. She became a member of the National Assembly in 2019 and she was appointed to be the Deputy Minister of Education. She became the Deputy Minister of Gender, Children, Disability and Social Welfare following the 2025 election.

== Life ==
Her husband Christopher Ngwira was arrested by the Anti-Corruption Bureau in 2018. He was not able to stand in the 2019 elections because the Supreme Court had declared him to be a bankrupt. In 2019 Henry Mumba was chosen as the DPP candidate to represent Mzimba Hora but his name was withdrawn and Martha Mzomera Ngwira was chosen. However the electoral commission would not allow Mumba's name to be withdrawn so the DPP had more than one candidate, but they favoured Martha.

She was elected and in December 2019 she joined a delegation led by the first lady, Gertrude Mutharika to China. Ngwira had already been appointed as the Deputy Minister of Education. She was concerned about the high number of girls who leave school to have babies or to get married.

In October 2020, she and her son were in Mzimba magistrates court when her husband was sentenced to four years, with hard labour, for misappropriating public funds. He had awarded a contract to build some houses for teachers, but the contract was not his to award. Her husband wanted to appeal the sentence but his bail was cancelled and he was taken away in handcuffs from the court. He was released in 2022 on appeal. The appeal judge agreed with the conviction for forging bank documents, but the sentence was considered too harsh.

Ngwira joined the Malawi Parliamentary Women's Caucus that was then led by Roseby Gadama.

She was appointed to be the Deputy Minister of Gender, Children, Disability and Social Welfare by President Peter Mutharika on 30 October 2025. She was one of six women in a cabinet of 24 and this low percentage caused some criticism of the President.
