= Ex machina (group) =

- Also known as: ex machina project
- Origin: Trier, Germany
- Genres: Alternative rock, Synth-pop, Electronica, Dark wave
- Years active: 1999–present
- Label: Fuego
- Members: Claudio Chiriatti, Tobias Schwerdt
- Website: exmachinaproject.com

Ex machina (stylized in lowercase, also known as ex machina project) is a German music project.

== History ==
Ex machina is a music project that was founded by Claudio Chiriatti in 1999 in Trier. Tobias Schwerdt has become a second member since 2008. Ex machina has distributed its music over the Internet from the very beginning. The debut album ex machina, as well as a few individual pieces, have been released in download only formats in self-distribution. Also the album bewegung / movement produced from 2004 to 2005, was released at various music download web sites in self-distribution.

In October 2006, a contract was signed with Friedel Muders for his music label Fuego, since then the music of ex machina has been distributed exclusively via this label. In November 2006 Fuego released the albums bewegung / movement, lichter / lights and warten / waiting. These albums were produced over a period of two years and were released at the same time. The first two albums, ex machina and welttblick, as well as various individual tracks, were no longer distributed. The music on these three albums is purely instrumental and the pieces are adapted to the respective album theme. Accordingly, the opening track sunset / sunset on the album lichter / lights is an attempt to compose a musical version of a sunset. The progress of the track represents the intensification of the resulting colors.

Ex machina contributed a composition to the art project Music from the Masses initiated by the artist Matthias Fritsch at the Center for Art and Media Karlsruhe. Afterwards Music from the Masses was shown as a traveling exhibition in different museums.

Claudio Chiriatti moved back to his birthplace Clausthal-Zellerfeld in early 2008. In the same year he got into contact with his old school friend Tobias Schwerdt. Both musicians decided to work together on ex machina. The first album they produced together was line of time and it was released in April 2011 at Fuego. It is the first ex machina album on which all titles are in English language. Furthermore, for the first time there are classic pop songs with vocals included on this album. A further innovation is the participation of a guest musician on line of time. Eva Heuling has sung the lead vocals for three songs.

After line of time the album no one was released in April 2013. It is a concept album that tells the story of a self-proclaimed prophet. According to reviewers the sound of the album is "rougher, gloomier" than on the previous releases. Critics praised the musical diversity of the album, accordingly, many different genre influences can be heard on the album. It is described as "peppered with Kraftwerk character and interwoven with The Cure Sound". For the songs no one, eternity and drifting ex machina produced music videos which should lead deeper into the story of the concept album. After the release of no one, ex machina released tracks that were not included on the album, as free downloads at SoundCloud. Following the release of no one the two musicians were working on a live program. They decided to realize a live sequencing concept with their music. Within this concept, Claudio Chiriatti should take over the live sequencing and play individual lines live on a controller. Tobias Schwerdt on the other hand should sing, add effects and live sequencing. To the music, short, visually complementary video clips were projected onto a screen behind the musicians. This live presentation had its premiere in January 2014 at the Kellerclub Clausthal-Zellerfeld.

== Discography ==
- 2000: ex machina (Album, Self-released)
- 2005: bewegung / movement (Album, Self-released)
- 2006: bewegung / movement (Album, Fuego)
- 2006: lichter / lights (Album, Fuego)
- 2006: warten / waiting (Album, Fuego)
- 2011: line of time (Album, Fuego)
- 2013: no one (Album, Fuego)
- 2021: roaming through wasteland (Single, Fuego)
- 2021: memories of tomorrow (Single, Fuego)
- 2022: escape from myself (Single, Fuego)
- 2022: exit right now (Single, Fuego)
- 2026: afternoon 2026 (Single, Fuego)
- 2026: morning after 2026 (Single, Fuego)
