= Joel Chigona =

Malawian politician and minister

Minister of Labour Skills and Innovation Affairs
- Incumbent
- Assumed office October 30, 2025
- President: Peter Mutharika

Joel Chigona is a Malawian politician who currently serves as minister of Labour Skills and Innovation. He was appointed to the position by President Peter Mutharika on 30 October 2025.
