= Roza Fatch Mbilizi =

Malawian politician

Minister of Agriculture, Irrigation and Water Development
- Incumbent
- Assumed office 16 October 2025
- President: Peter Mutharika
- Preceded by: Samuel Kawale; Abida Mia

Member of the National Assembly for Mangochi Central Constituency
- Incumbent
- Assumed office 27 October 2025
- President: Peter Mutharika
- Preceded by: Victoria Kingstone

Personal details
- Born: Rosa Madalo Fatch; 6 October 1968 (age 57)
- Party: Democratic Progressive Party

Rosa Madalo Fatch became Roza Fatch Mbilizi is a Malawian politician and Member of Parliament who serves as the Minister of Agriculture, Irrigation and Water Development. She was appointed by President Peter Mutharika in October 2025.

== Life ==
Fatch was born on 6 October 1968. She took her first degree in Social Science at Chancellor College and she graduated in 1989. She was enrolled at the University of Queensland from 1991 to 1993 where she graduated with a master's degree in economic studies. She was an economist at the Ministry of Finance and Economic Planning and Development in the 1990s. In 2000 she became the Head of Policy, Planning and Research at the Malawi Revenue Authority and she was there for twelve years.

She married Francis Mbilizi, however he died in 2020.

She announced herself as a candidate for the 2025 election in the Mangochi Central constituency and in August she published her six point plan - which included agriculture. She objected to the name that that the Malawi Electoral Commission placed on the ballot form as she had applied as Roza Madalo Fatch. She had campaigned under this name having been told by the MEC that the name was fine. The commission later registered her under her married name of Rosa Madalo Mbilizi even though she had legally reverted to the name of Fatch when she became a widow. The court supported the MEC who argued that they were trying to minimise confusion in the electorate.

In the September 2025 general election, Mbilizi won the Mangochi Central parliamentary seat, defeating former MP Victoria Kingstone. The following month, Kingstone and two associates were arrested on allegations of plotting to kill Mbilizi following the election. Kingstone denied any wrongdoing and was later released on bail by the Mangochi Magistrate Court.

Re-elected President Peter Mutharika announced her as a Minister of Agriculture on 16 October 2025. She was one of only six women in a cabinet of 24 people. The low number of women and the high number of cabinet members attracted some criticism. Mbilizi commended the tobacco industry in 2025 as they purchased 221m kg of tobacco. They had only expected 213m kg so she was pleased that the additional tobacco had been purchased. Commissioner Ebbie Mathanda, who was the Tobacco Commission Vice Chairperson noted that farmers needed to grow what was required observing all the quality standards.

In March 2026 she was announcing the second phase of a mechanisation project supported by Philip Morris International and involving a local company Pyxus Agriculture Limited. 23 tractors were loaned to farmers in 2024 as part of the national agriculture policy and in 2026 the project was 40.
