= Devel Sixteen =

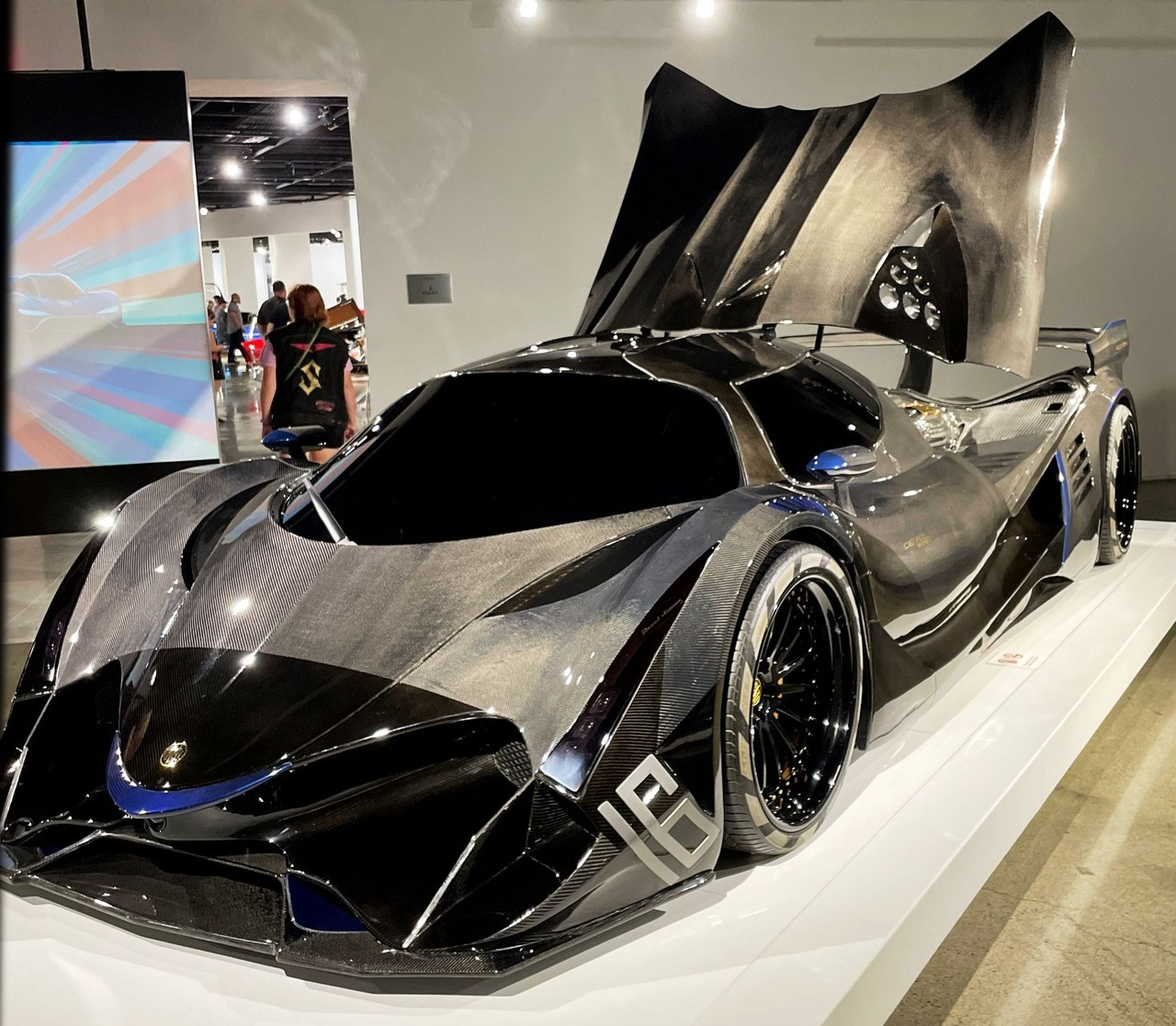

Overview
- Manufacturer: Defining the Extreme Vehicles Car Industry LLC (Devel Motors UAE)
- Production: 2022

Body and chassis
- Class: concept car (S)
- Body style: 2-door coupé
- Layout: Mid-engine, four-wheel-drive

Powertrain
- Engine: 12.3 L Quad-turbo V16; V8 (base model)
- Power output: 1,500 hp (1,521 PS) or 2,000 hp (2,028 PS) (base model) (hypothetical); 3,006 hp (3,048 PS) at 6,900 rpm 5,007 hp (5,076 PS) (track-only version)(reported, unconfirmed)
- Transmission: 8-speed automatic

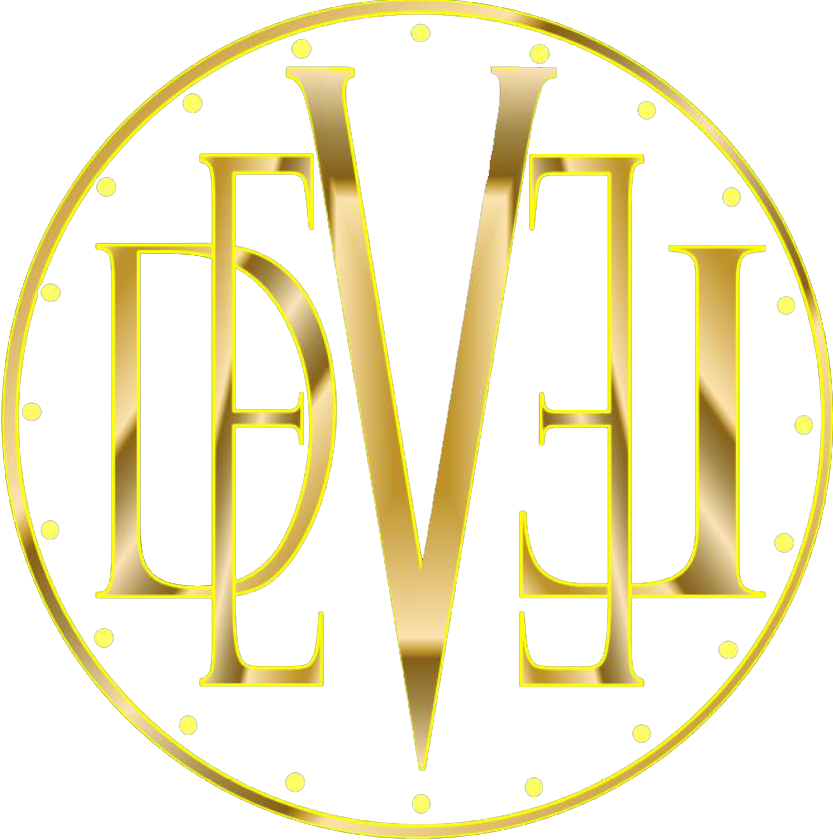
Devel Motors' logo

The Devel Sixteen is a mid-engine hypercar concept designed in the United Arab Emirates by Devel Motors. In 2021, Devel Motors claimed that the quad-turbo V16 engine fitted to the car would be the fastest car in the world. Devel claimed that the Sixteen could produce at 5,007 horsepower (hp) and claims a top speed of 350 mph (560 km/h) as the car can supposedly pull off a 0 to 60 mph time of 1.8 seconds; its announced base version price ranged from US$1.7 million to over $2 million.

According to Devel Motors, three models of the Sixteen are planned: a base model with a V8 engine producing around 1,500–2,000 hp (1,100–1,500 kW; 1,500–2,000 PS); a version with a V16 engine producing around 3,006 hp (2,242 kW; 3,048 PS) and 2,407 lb⋅ft (3,263 N⋅m) of torque; and a track-only version with a quad-turbo V16 engine producing 5,007 hp (3,734 kW; 5,076 PS) and 3,757 lb⋅ft (5,094 N⋅m) of torque. In June 2022, one Sixteen with a V8 engine was produced, but its performance is not yet confirmed.

A 2024 report claimed that the only V8 car known to be delivered was based on a body kit wrapped around a C8 Corvette, down to the Chevrolet "triple beep" sound produced when the key is left behind in the vehicle. According to a 2025 report, the V16 engine planned for the car was composed of two off-the-shelf V8 crate engines, tuned to minimize engine vibration. The same report claims that the project to build a functional car has not been successful.

== Gallery ==
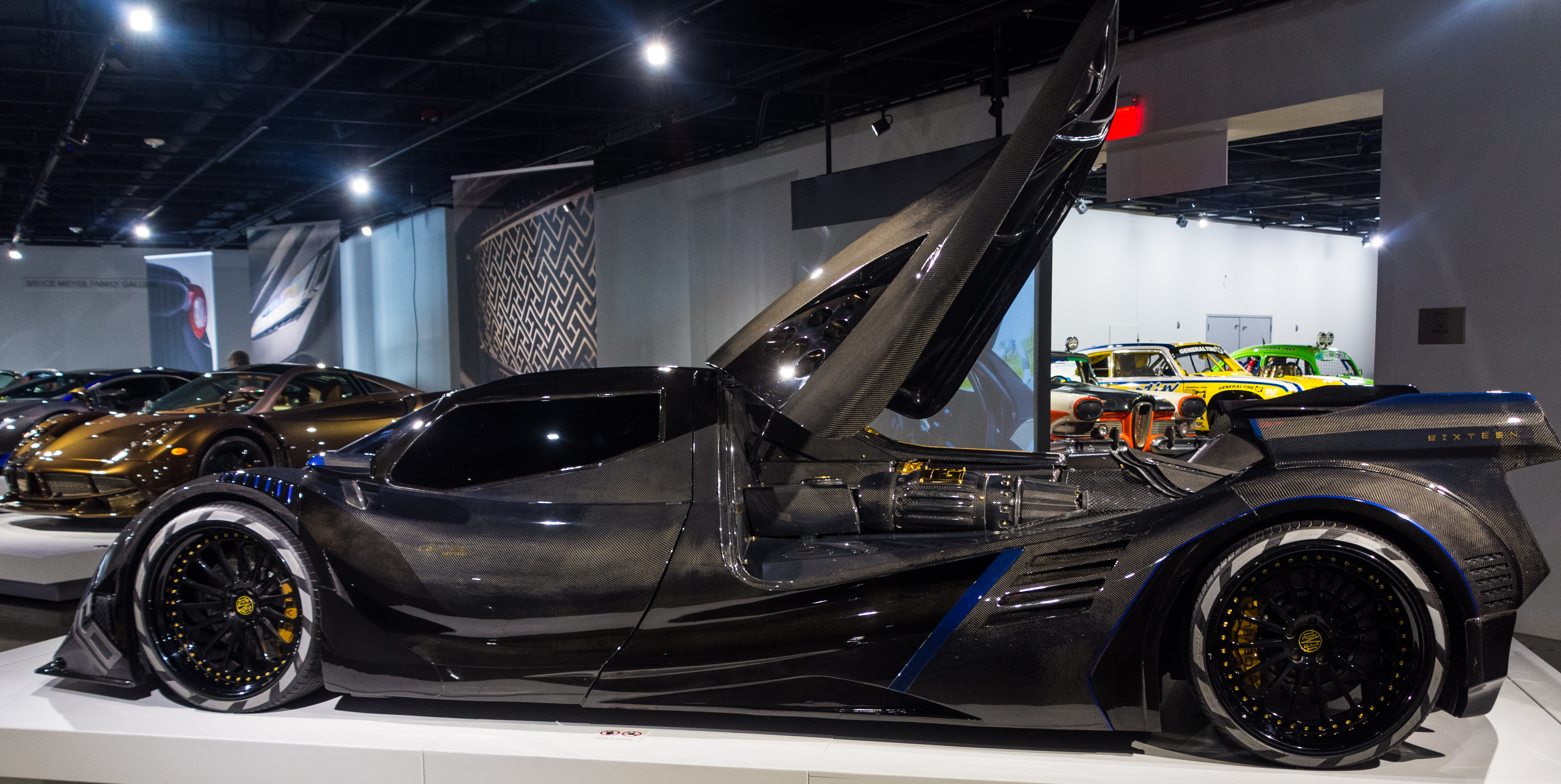
Side

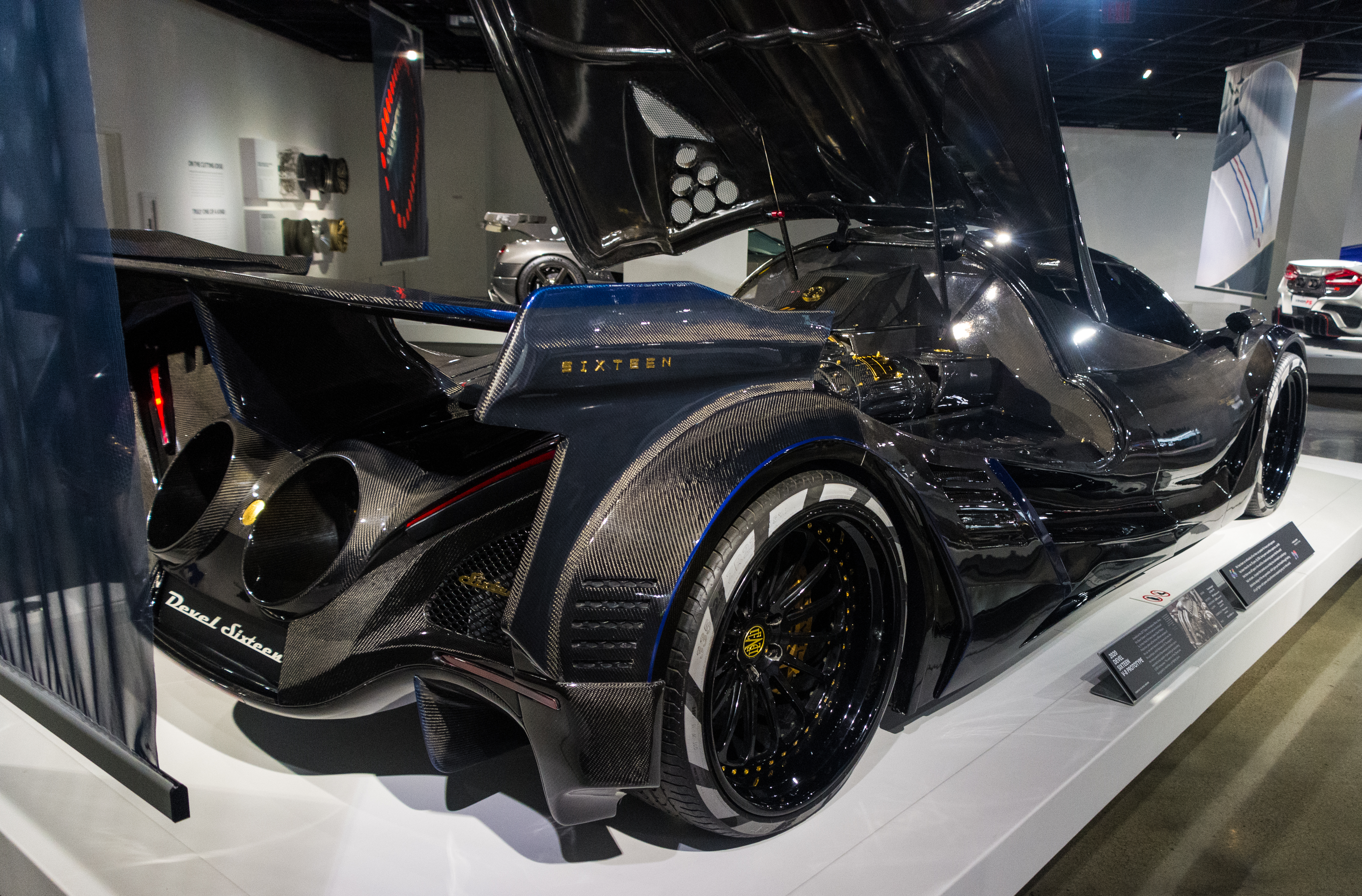
Rear

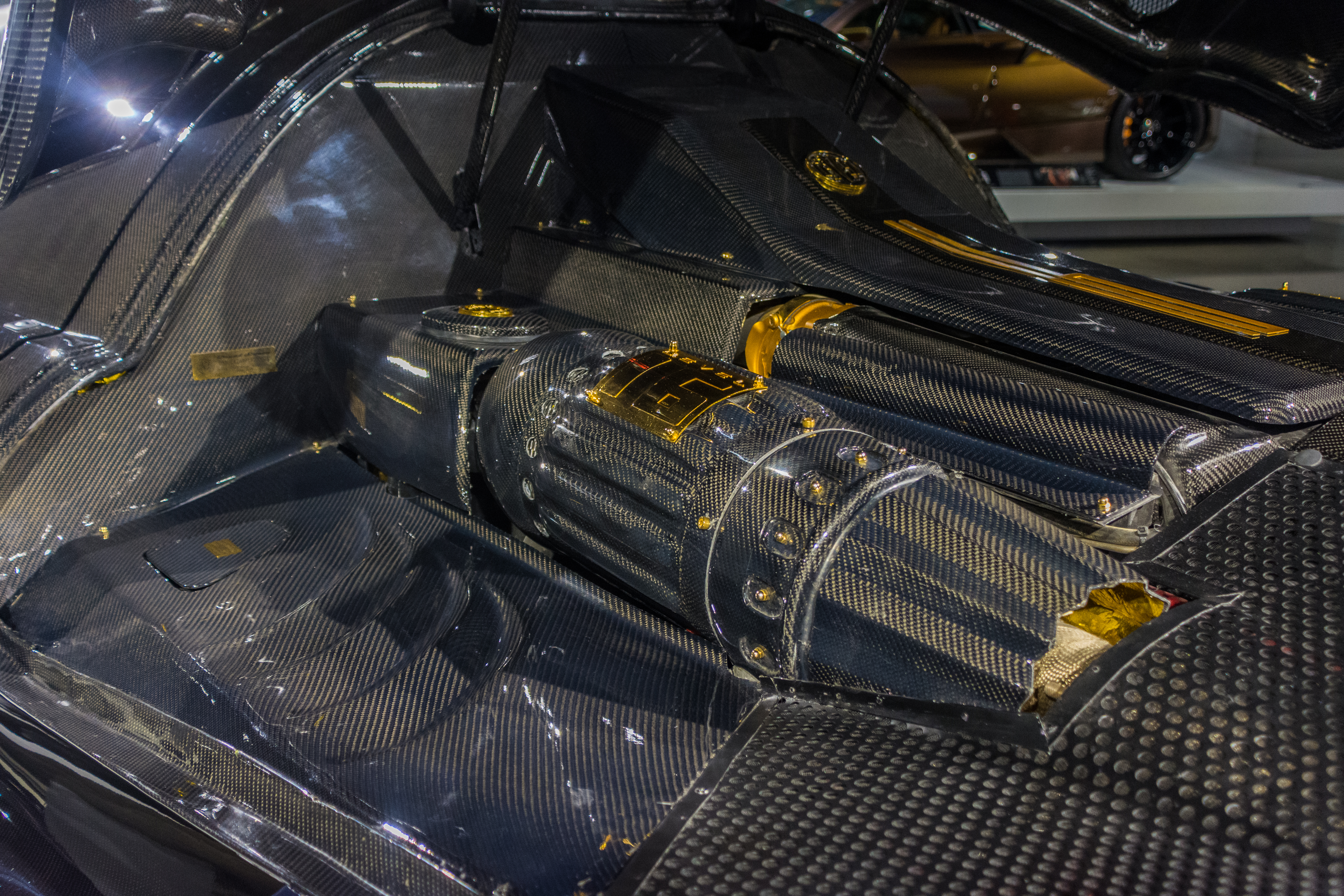
View of the engine
