= Ex Machina (novel) =

2004 novel by Christopher L. Bennett

Star Trek: Ex Machina is a novel based on characters from Star Trek: The Original Series (TOS) and Star Trek: The Motion Picture (TMP). The story is set shortly after the events of the movie, and also acts as a sequel to the episode "For the World Is Hollow and I Have Touched the Sky".

It was written by Christopher L. Bennett and published by Pocket Books in December 2004.

== Synopsis ==
The plot concerns several crew members' efforts to deal with the aftereffects of the V'Ger entity and the long-term ripples of overthrowing a computer intelligence on Yonada so many years ago.

== Reviews ==
The writers of the 2009 Star Trek film cite the book as one of their favorites.

"[Ex Machina is] a great example of how a 'Trek' novel can fit within 'canon' while existing between the movies we love."

— Alex Kurtzman and Roberto Orci
