= Jacob Hara =

Malawian politician

Minister of Transport and Public Works of Malawi
- In office 31 January 2023 – 15 September 2025
- President: Lazarus Chakwera
- Preceded by: Sidik Mia
- Succeeded by: Feston Kaupa

Personal details
- Born: Malawi
- Party: Malawi Congress Party

Jacob Hara is a Malawian politician and educator. He became the Minister of Transport and Public Works of Malawi, when he was appointed to the position in early January 2023 by the president of Malawi Lazarus Chakwera. His term began on January 31, 2023.

Hara was elected in the Mzimba Solora Constituency as the Malawi Congress Party candidate in 2018.

Awards and achievements
Preceded by	Minister of Transport and Public Works of Malawi	Succeeded by
