= Feston Kaupa =

Malawian politician and minister

Minister of Transport and Public Works
- Incumbent
- Assumed office October 30, 2025
- President: Peter Mutharika
- Preceded by: Jacob Hara

Personal details
- Party: Democratic Progressive Party

Feston Kaupa is a Malawian politician who currently serves as minister of Transport and Public Works. He was appointed to the position by President Peter Mutharika on 30 October 2025.
