= Deus ex machina (disambiguation) =

Deus ex machina is a Latin term meaning "god from the machine", and is used to indicate a person or event which provides a sudden, unexpected solution to a story.

Deus ex machina may also refer to:

== Music ==
- Deus Ex Machina (punk band), (s. 1989), a Greek hardcore punk band
- Deus ex Machina (Italian band), (s. 1990), an Italian jazz-rock band
- Deus Ex Machina (heavy metal band), (s. 2004), a Singaporean death/thrash metal band
- Deus ex Machina (Daugherty), a 2007 composition for piano and orchestra by composer Michael Daugherty

=== Albums ===
- Deus Ex Machina (Paul Schütze album), 1989
- Deus Ex Machina (Liv Kristine album), 1998
- The Deus Ex Machina Cycle, a 1999 album by Elodie Lauten
- Deus Ex Machinae (album), a 2004 album by Machinae Supremacy
- Deus Ex Machina, a 2010 film industry-only release by audiomachine

=== Songs ===
- "Deus Ex Machina", a song by Laibach from the 1996 album Jesus Christ Superstars
- "Deus Ex Machina," a song by The Smashing Pumpkins from the 2000 album Machina II/The Friends & Enemies of Modern Music
- "Deus Ex Machina", a song by Omar Rodríguez-López of The Mars Volta from the 2004 album A Manual Dexterity: Soundtrack Volume One
- "Deus Ex Machina", a song by Moi Dix Mois from the 2006 album Beyond the Gate
- "Ghost Prototype II (Deus Ex Machina)", a song by Scar Symmetry from the 2008 album Holographic Universe
- "Deus Ex Machina", a song by Pure Reason Revolution from the 2009 album Amor Vincit Omnia
- "Deus Ex Machina", a song by Cavalera Conspiracy from the 2014 album Pandemonium
- "Deus Ex Machina", a song by Deadmau5 from the 2016 album W:/2016Album/

== Television and film ==
- "Deus Ex Machina" (Lost), a 2005 episode of the television series Lost
- "Deus Ex Machina" (Person of Interest), a 2014 episode of the television series Person of Interest
- Deus Ex Machina, an episode of the anime Ergo Proxy and the title theme of its soundtrack
- Deus Ex Machina, an episode of the sixth series of Waking the Dead
- Deus Ex Machina, the English title of the 25th episode of the anime RahXephon
- Deus Ex Machina, an episode of Jeremiah
- Deus Ex Machina, the final episode of Byker Grove
- "Deus Machina", the name of the mechas from the anime, manga and game Demonbane
- Deus Ex Machina, a god character from the manga and anime Future Diary (未来日記 Mirai Nikki)
- Deus Ex Machina, the name of the leader of the sentient machines in The Matrix Revolutions
- Deus ex machina, organisation in You, Me and the Apocalypse

== Literature ==
- DeusExMachina, a 1999 book of black and white photographs by photographer Ralph Gibson
- Deus Ex Machina, a short story by Richard Matheson
- Deus Ex Machina, a story in the comic book Animal Man, and the title of the third collected edition
- Deus Machina, or Machine Doll, a type of doll created from the likeness of a human being in the light novel and in the manga series Unbreakable Machine-Doll
- Deus Ex Machina, a novel by Andrew Foster Altschul

== Video games ==
- Deus Ex Machina (video game), a 1984 multimedia computer game
- Deus Ex, a series of first-person video games released from 2000 to 2016

== Other ==
- Deus Ex Machina (company), designer of surf, snow, and street clothing

== See also ==
- Ex Machina (disambiguation)
- "Ex Deus Machina", an episode of the television show Stargate SG-1
