= Chimwemwe Chipungu =

Malawian politician

Minister of Defence
- Incumbent
- Assumed office October 30, 2025
- President: Peter Mutharika

Chimwemwe Chipungu is a Malawian politician who currently serves as Minister of Defence. Chipungu was appointed to the position by President Peter Mutharika on 30 October 2025.
