= Minister of Agriculture (Malawi) =

Ministry in Malawi

The Minister of Agriculture of Malawi is a cabinet position in the Malawi government. The Minister of Agriculture is responsible for formulating and implementing policies aimed at promoting agricultural productivity, improving food security, and enhancing the livelihoods of farmers. The minister also oversees the development of irrigation systems, agricultural research, and extension services.

The aim of the Ministry of Agriculture is to improve agricultural productivity and sustainable development and management of land and water resources to achieve food, nutrition, and income security for economic growth and development.

Roza Fatch Mbilizi was appointed in 2025.

== History ==
=== Origin and establishment ===
The Ministry of Agriculture was established in 1964, shortly after Malawi gained independence from British colonial rule. The ministry was created to oversee the development of the country's agricultural sector, which was then the mainstay of the economy.

== Mission and vision ==
The mission of the Ministry of Agriculture is to accelerate broad-based agriculture, as well as water, and irrigation development for social and economic growth and development. The vision is to have a nation with sustainable agricultural productivity and water for all.

== List of officeholders ==
Here is a list of the former Ministers of Agriculture in Malawi:

- Hon. Aleke Banda (1964–1971)
- Hon. Robin Lowe (1971–1976)
- Hon. Kamuzu Banda (1976–1983)
- Hon. Gwanda Chakuamba (1983–1992)
- Hon. John Tembo (1992–1994)
- Hon. Cassim Chilumpha (1994–1999)
- Hon. Uladi Mussa (1999–2004)
- Hon. Khumbo Kachali (2004–2009)
- Hon. Peter Mutharika (2009–2014)
- Hon. Allan Chiyembekeza (2014–2019)
- Hon. Sam Kawale (2019–2025) (appointed by President Chakwera.)
- Hon. Roza Fatch Mbilizi (2025 - ?)
