= Moses Kunkuyu =

Malawi politician

Moses Kunkuyu Kalongashawa

Minister of information and digitization
- In office 31 January 2023 – 15 September 2025
- President: Lazarus Chakwera
- Preceded by: Gospel Kazako
- Succeeded by: TBD

Minister of Information and civic education
- In office 10 April 2012 – 24 May 2014
- President: Joyce Banda
- Preceded by: Patricia Kaliati

Member of Parliament Blantyre South
- In office 19 May 2009 – 2014

Personal details
- Party: Malawi Congress Party
- Profession: Politician

Moses Kunkuyu is a Malawi politician who served as the Minister of Information and digitization. He is also a Member of Parliament in the National Assembly of Malawi.

== Political career ==
Kunkuyu is one of the youngest politicians in the country. In 2009, he was elected Member of Parliament for the Blantyre south constituency on a Democratic Progressive Party ticket. Following the unpopularity of the Bingu wa Mutharika administration, Kunkuyu alleged in an interview for Zodiak Radio, Malawi that the advisors to the Party leadership were "too timid" to face him to Mutharika, and that the Party was living a lie. He subsequently formed the Hope Alliance, a pressure group within the Party seeking to influence change from within to the Mutharika government. This led to a hostile response from the government. Following the succession of Joyce Banda to the Malawi Presidency, Kunkuyu was appointed Minister of Information and Civic Education.
