= Deus Vayanne =

DEUS Vayanne
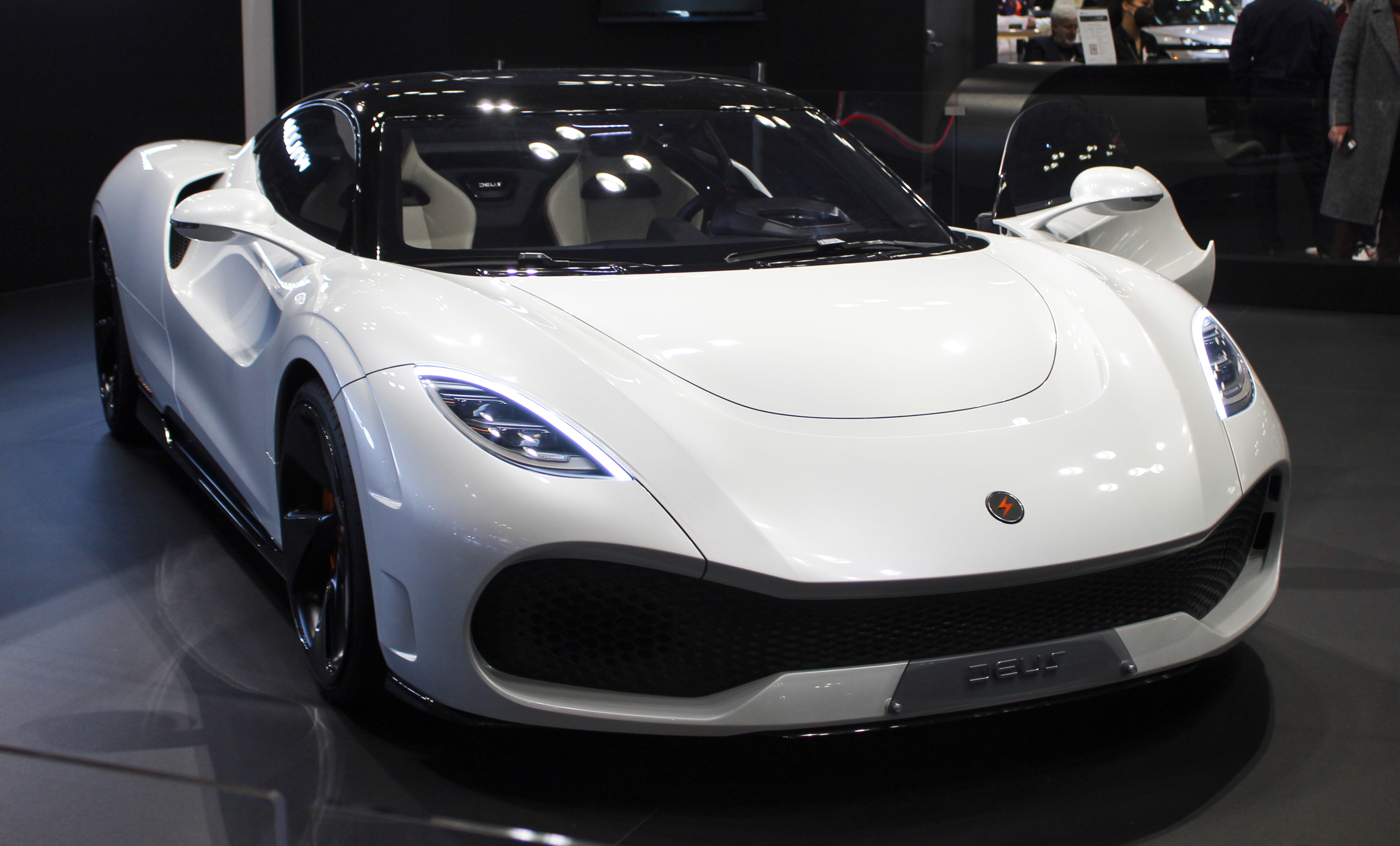

Overview
- Manufacturer: DEUS Automobiles
- Production: 2025; 99 units made
- Assembly: Italdesign Giugiaro
- Designer: Adrian-Filip Butuca

Body and chassis
- Class: Sports car (S)
- Body style: 2-door coupe
- Layout: electric motors (two rear, one front)

Powertrain
- Engine: Electric
- Power output: 2250 horsepower

The DEUS Vayanne is an all-electric sports car produced by the Austrian car manufacturer DEUS Automobiles. The production is limited to just 99 units and went into production in 2025.

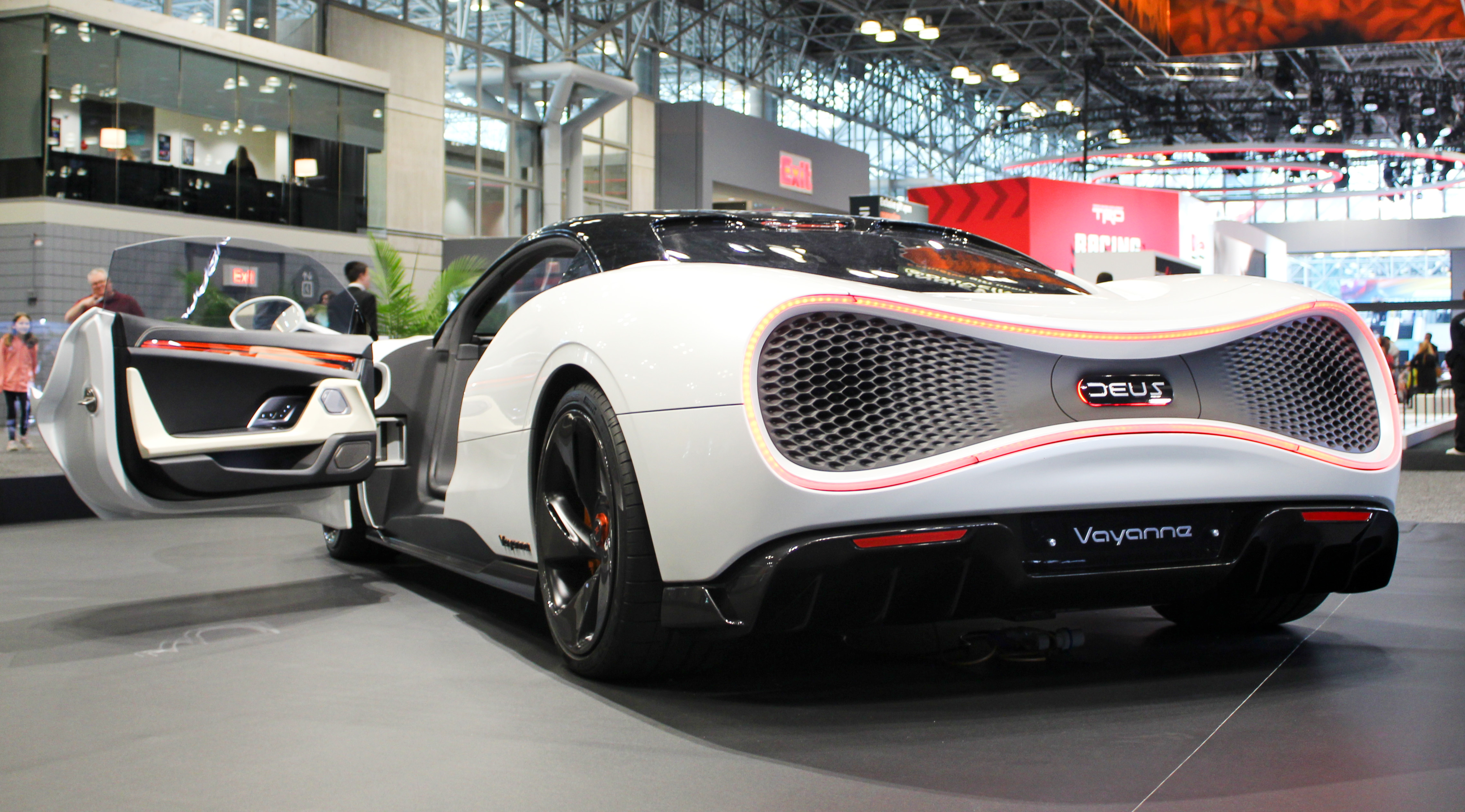
Deus Vayanne rear

== Overview ==
The Vayanne was presented at the New York International Auto Show in April 2022. It was developed in collaboration with Italdesign and Williams Advanced Engineering, a subsidiary of Williams Grand Prix Engineering and produced in Turin, Italy, at the premises of Italdesign.

The Austria-based company, together with its technical partners Italdesign Giugiaro and Williams Advanced Engineering, claims the Vayanne hit 100 km/h (62 mph) in under 1.99 seconds and it achieved a top speed of over 400 km/h (250 mph).

The Deus Vayanne was featured and appears in Asphalt 8: Airborne and in Asphalt Legends (originally called Asphalt 9: Legends) as a playable vehicle.
