= Jean Mathanga =

Malawian politician and minister(born 1967)

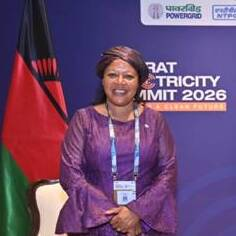
- in 2026

Minister of Energy and Mining
- Incumbent
- Assumed office October 30, 2025
- President: Peter Mutharika
- Preceded by: Ibrahim Matola

Personal details
- Born: 28 June 1967 (age 59)
- Party: Democratic Progressive Party
- Spouse: Henry Mathanga
- Occupation: Politician

Jean Chifuniro Mathanga (born 28 June 1967) is a Malawian politician who served as minister of Energy and Mining from 2025. She has been a Malawi Electoral Commissioner and the director of elections for the Democratic Progressive Party. She was the chair of the board for the Electricity Supply Corporation of Malawi (Escom) and she has been accused by the Anti-Corruption Bureau of an illegal procurement. Malawi's Director of Public Prosecutions stopped the case against the minister in 2026.

== Life ==
Mathanga has a first degree in business administration and a master's degree in leadership and management.

She was the chair of the board at the Electricity Supply Corporation of Malawi (Escom). In 2017 she gave evidence to the Anti-Corruption Bureau concerning a procurement worth 4 billion Kwacha. It is alleged that the information was false.

She and Escom's CEO John Kandulu were arrested in 2020 regarding the procurement which the Anti-Corruption Bureau (ACB) said was done without paperwork. Her lawyers tried unsuccessfully to argue that the case was outside the ACB's jurisdiction because ESCOM was not a public body. The court said that ESCOM was wholly owned by the state and it was therefore a public body.

Mathanga was a commissioner with the Malawi Electoral Commission before she worked for a Malawian political party. She became the Democratic Progressive Party's National Director of Elections.

In 2025 she and three others were to be tried by High Court Judge Violet Chipao concerning the 2017 pronouncement. The evidence was said to go back to 2011. In the same year, she was appointed to be the minister of Energy and Mining by the newly re-elected President Peter Mutharika on 30 October 2025.

In February 2026, High Court Judge Violet Chipao called on Malawi's Director of Public Prosecutions to account for why they stopped a financial case against Jean Mathanga (and others) was stopped. The judge ordered that the reasons be given to the Legal Affairs Committee of the National Assembly within ten days. In November, she was still a minister, rejecting calls for her registration, because of the nationwide fuel supply crisis. She like her predecessors blamed the shortages on the lack of foreign exchange. She also blamed politically motivated employees who she alleged were creating power cuts to assist unnamed politicians. Plans to press for her resignation continued with marches organised in major cities. These were organised by the Human Rights Defenders Coalition even though its NGO approval was removed.
