= Deus Gumba =

Malawian politician

Minister of Lands of Malawi
- Incumbent
- Assumed office 31 January 2023
- President: Lazarus Chakwera

Personal details
- Born: Malawi
- Party: Malawi Congress Party

Deus Gumba is a Malawian politician and educator. He is the current Minister of Lands in Malawi, having been appointed to the position in early January 2023 by the current president of Malawi Lazarus Chakwera. His term began on 31 January 2023.

Awards and achievements
| Preceded by | Minister of Lands of Malawi | Succeeded by |
