= Francis Foley (politician) =

Malawian politician and minister

Deputy Minister of Education, Science and Technology
- Incumbent
- Assumed office October 30, 2025
- President: Peter Mutharika

Francis Foley (politician) is a Malawian politician who currently serves as Deputy Minister of Education, Science and Technology. Foley was appointed to the position by President Peter Mutharika on 30 October 2025.
