= Patricia Wiskes =

Malawian politician and minister

Minister of Natural Resources, Malawi
- Incumbent
- Assumed office 30 January 2026
- President: Peter Mutharika
- In office 30 October 2025 – 30 January 2026
- President: Peter Mutharika

Member of Parliament for Lilongwe City Nankhaka Constituency
- Incumbent
- Assumed office 27 October 2025
- President: Peter Mutharika

Personal details
- Born: 18 August 1988 (age 38)
- Party: Democratic Progressive Party
- Education: University of Malawi (BA)
- Alma mater: The King's Foundation
- Occupation: Politician

Patricia Wiskes (born 18 August 1988) is a Malawian politician who has served as Minister of Natural Resources since January 2026, following a cabinet reshuffle by President Arthur Peter Mutharika. She is also a Member of the Malawi Parliament for Lilongwe City Nankhaka Constituency and serves as Government Chip Whip in the Malawi National Assembly.

Wiskes previously served as Minister of Youth, Sports and Culture from October 2025 until the January 2026 cabinet reshuffle

== Education ==
Patricia Wiskes attended a Kings Foundation school in Malawi. She later pursued a Bachelor's degree in Communication and Cultural Studies at the University of Malawi, where she graduated in 2017.

== Professional career ==
After graduating from the University of Malawi in 2017, Patricia Wiskes joined the Parliament of Malawi as a Public Relations Specialist In 2025, after returning to Parliament as an elected member, she described herself as a former employee of the institution and said her previous experience had given her a strong understanding of parliamentary procedures and legislative processes.

== Entry in Politics ==
Wiskes joined active politics in 2013. In the September 2025 Malawi General Elections, Wiskes contested for the position of Member of Parliament for the newly established Lilongwe City Nankhaka Constituency as a candidate for the Democratic Progressive Party. Wiskes emerged victorious in the highly contested election, defeating former Malawi Congress Party legislator Alfred Jiya. In October 2025, Wiskes was named as the DPP's Chief Whip in Parliament, with Martha Munthali-Ngwira as her deputy.

On 30 October 2025, President, Arthur Peter Mutharika named her as one of his first cabinet ministers, as minister of Youth, Sports and Culture. On 30 January 2026, she was moved to the Ministry of Natural Resources, swapping portfolios with Alfred Gangata, who took over the Youth, Sports and Culture portfolio.
