= Richard Chimwendo Banda =

Malawian politician

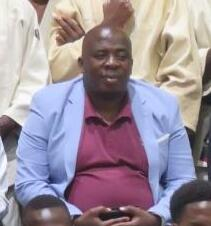
- Born: Richard Chimwendo Banda; Dowa, Malawi
- Other names: Williams, Bulldozer
- Occupations: Educator; Diploma in Public Health Activist; politician
- Spouse: Married

Richard Chimwendo Banda is a Malawian politician and educator who is the "former Minister of Local Government, Unity and Culture, Leader of Government Business in Parliament, National Youth Director for the ruling MCP. He went to Mwanza Secondary School Unity, and Culture in Malawi from January 2022. He is a Member of Parliament for Dowa East Constituency. In July 2020, he was Minister of Homeland Security before being replaced by Jean Muonaowauza Sendeza in 2022.

== Life ==
Banda was born in 1963 in Dowa, Malawi. He went to Mwanza Secondary School. He has a Bachelor's Degree in Development Studies. He is currently pursuing Master's Degree in Public Policy and Administration.

In 2026 he was the Leader of the House in Parliament and the Minister of Local Government, Unity and Culture. He announced that Dedza, Salima and Karonga would return to having a town council.

Awards and achievements
Preceded by	Minister of Homeland Security	Succeeded by Jean Muonaowauza Sendeza
