= Samuel Kawale =

Malawian politician and educator

- Born: Samuel Kawale; 1979 (age 46–47); Kasungu, Malawi
- Occupations: Educator; Activist; politician

Samuel Dalitso Kawale (born 1979) is a Malawian politician and a social worker who served as a Minister of Agriculture of Malawi from 25 October 2022 to 15 September 2025. He is a Member of Parliament for Dowa North East Constituency.

The Ombudsman, Grace Malera's report in 2024 was welcomed by Kawale. On 2022 the President sacked the previous Minister of Agriculture, Lobin Lowe, and his deputy over the loss of K750 million from the Affordable Inputs Programme which was intended to subsidise subsistance farming. Malera's report recommended prosecution of public officials involved in the fraudulent contract made with Bakaart Foods Limited. She said that fraud continued and forensic audits should take place looking at the funds operation. Kawale said this was his opinion too.

Kawale was reelected in 2025. He became the chair of the parliamentary committee responsible for Government Assurances & Public Sector Reforms. He and Juliana Kaduya who is the vice-chair could serve from 2025 to 2030.

== Personal life ==
Kawale was born in 1979 in Zomba, Malawi. He attended his Secondary School at Paul Roos Gymnasium in Stellenbosch, South Africa. He has a Master's in Business Administration from ESAMI and currently pursuing PhD in Transformation Leadership at Bakke Graduate University, USA. He was appointed by President Lazarus Chakwera as the new Minister of Agriculture replacing Lobin Lowe who got fired.

Awards and achievements
Preceded by Lobin Lowe	Minister of Agriculture of Malawi	Succeeded by Roza Fatch Mbilizi
