= Tonse Alliance (Malawi) =

2020 - 2024 Malawian political alliance

- Formation: March 19, 2020; 6 years ago
- Dissolved: Defunct (since 2024)
- Type: Political alliance
- Location: Malawi
- President: Lazarus Chakwera
- Vice President: Saulos Chilima

Tonse Alliance was a political coalition in Malawi that was formed in 2020 ahead of the country’s presidential election re-run. The alliance brought together nine opposition parties under a shared goal of unseating the then-ruling Democratic Progressive Party and its leader, Peter Mutharika. The coalition’s presidential candidate was Lazarus Chakwera of the Malawi Congress Party, with Saulos Chilima of the United Transformation Movement as his running mate. The pair went on to win the 2020 presidential election, ending Mutharika’s rule.

== Formation ==
The Tonse Alliance was announced on 19 March 2020, shortly after the Constitutional Court ordered a re-run of the annulled 2019 presidential election due to widespread irregularities. The word "Tonse", meaning “all of us together” in Chichewa, reflected the coalition’s inclusive approach to uniting Malawi’s fragmented opposition.

The founding members included:

- Malawi Congress Party (MCP)
- United Transformation Movement (UTM)
- People’s Party (PP)
- Alliance for Democracy (AFORD)
- People's Transformation Party (PETRA)
- Malawi Forum for Unity and Development (MAFUNDE)
- Umodzi Party (UP)
- Freedom Party (FP)
- Congress for the Second Republic (CSR)

Chakwera and Chilima agreed to run on a joint ticket, with the understanding that Chilima would lead the alliance in the subsequent election. The coalition positioned itself as a platform for reform, accountability, and economic recovery, promising affordable fertilizer, job creation, and better governance.

== Governance and internal tensions ==
Following their victory, Chakwera became president and Chilima vice president under the Tonse administration. The alliance initially presented a unified front, but internal tensions soon emerged over power-sharing, decision-making, and alleged breaches of the coalition agreement.

Reports indicated that the alliance agreement outlined that Chakwera would serve as president for the first term, after which Chilima would be the alliance’s candidate in the next election. However, disagreements later arose over the interpretation and implementation of this arrangement.

By 2023, several member parties expressed dissatisfaction, accusing the dominant MCP of monopolizing appointments and policy direction. AFORD leader Enoch Chihana publicly apologized to Malawians, calling the decision to join the alliance a “mistake”.

In March 2024, MCP and other alliance members publicly affirmed that the original Tonse Alliance agreement was set to expire in 2025. MCP spokesperson Ezekiel Ching’oma stated that the party’s National Executive Committee, having endorsed Lazarus Chakwera as its presidential candidate, would reconvene to plan for a new alliance framework beyond 2025.

== Withdrawal of member parties ==
The alliance began to fragment ahead of the 2025 general election.

- In May 2023, AFORD officially withdrew from the coalition, citing unmet expectations and lack of consultation.
- The United Transformation Movement, one of the key founding members, withdrew from the Tonse Alliance in July 2024, about a month after the death of its leader, Saulos Chilima, in a plane crash. The party cited the loss of its leader and deep policy disagreements with the Malawi Congress Party as reasons for its withdrawal.
- In August 2024, the People’s Party, led by former state president Joyce Banda, also left the alliance, arguing that the coalition had “lost direction”.

== Legacy and criticism ==
While the Tonse Alliance initially inspired optimism for unity and reform, many of its promises were perceived as unfulfilled. Criticism mounted over economic hardship, rising cost of living, and allegations of corruption during its administration. Several leaders, including those still within the alliance, issued public apologies for the government’s shortcomings.

Despite internal fractures, the Tonse Alliance remains a significant political development in Malawi’s multiparty history, representing a rare instance of opposition unity that successfully altered the country’s leadership through democratic means.

== See also ==
- Politics of Malawi
- Lazarus Chakwera
- Saulos Chilima
- 2020 Malawian presidential election
