= 2025 Malawian general election =

- 16 September 2025
- Presidential election
- Registered: 7,203,390
- Turnout: 76.39% (▲11.58 pp)
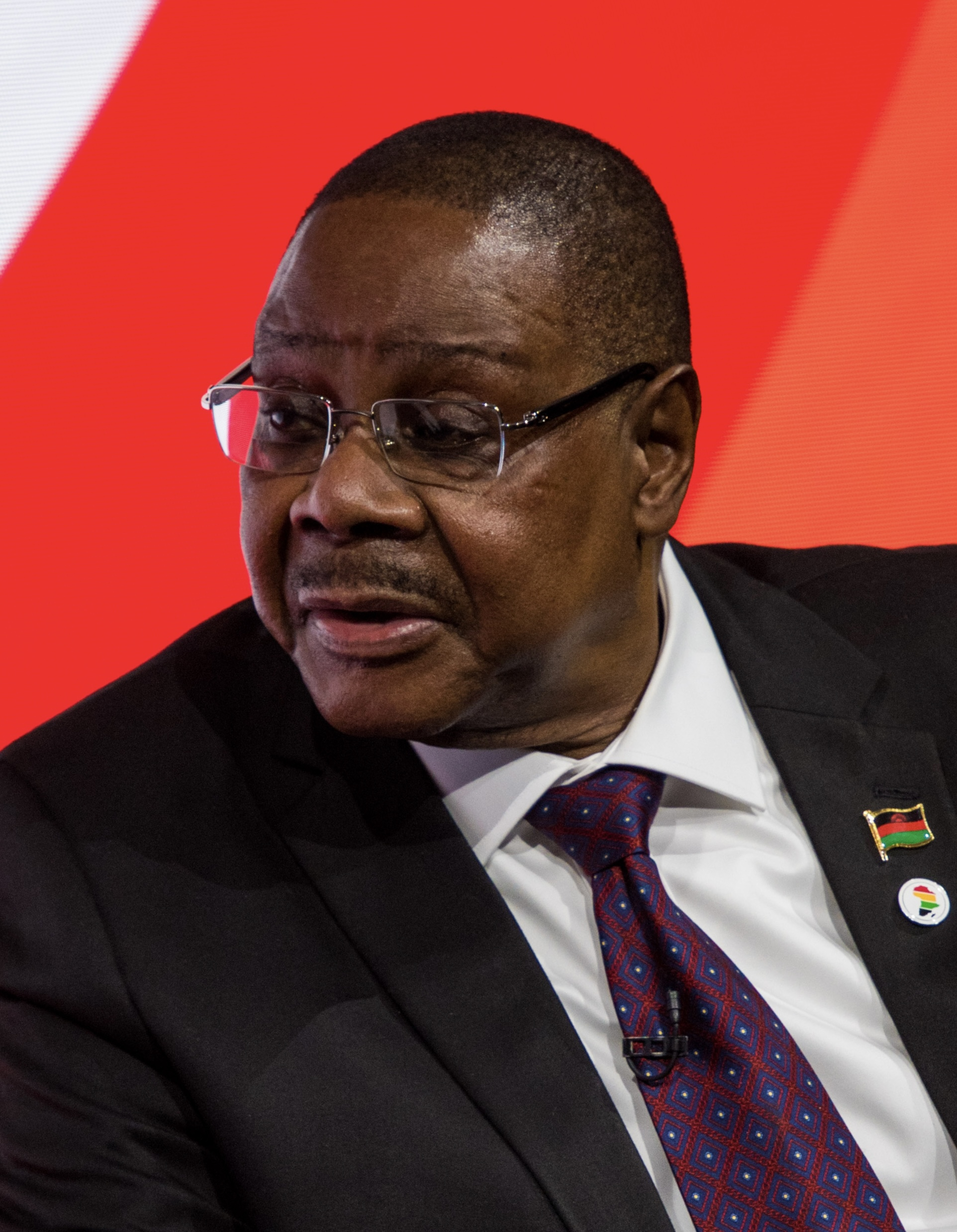

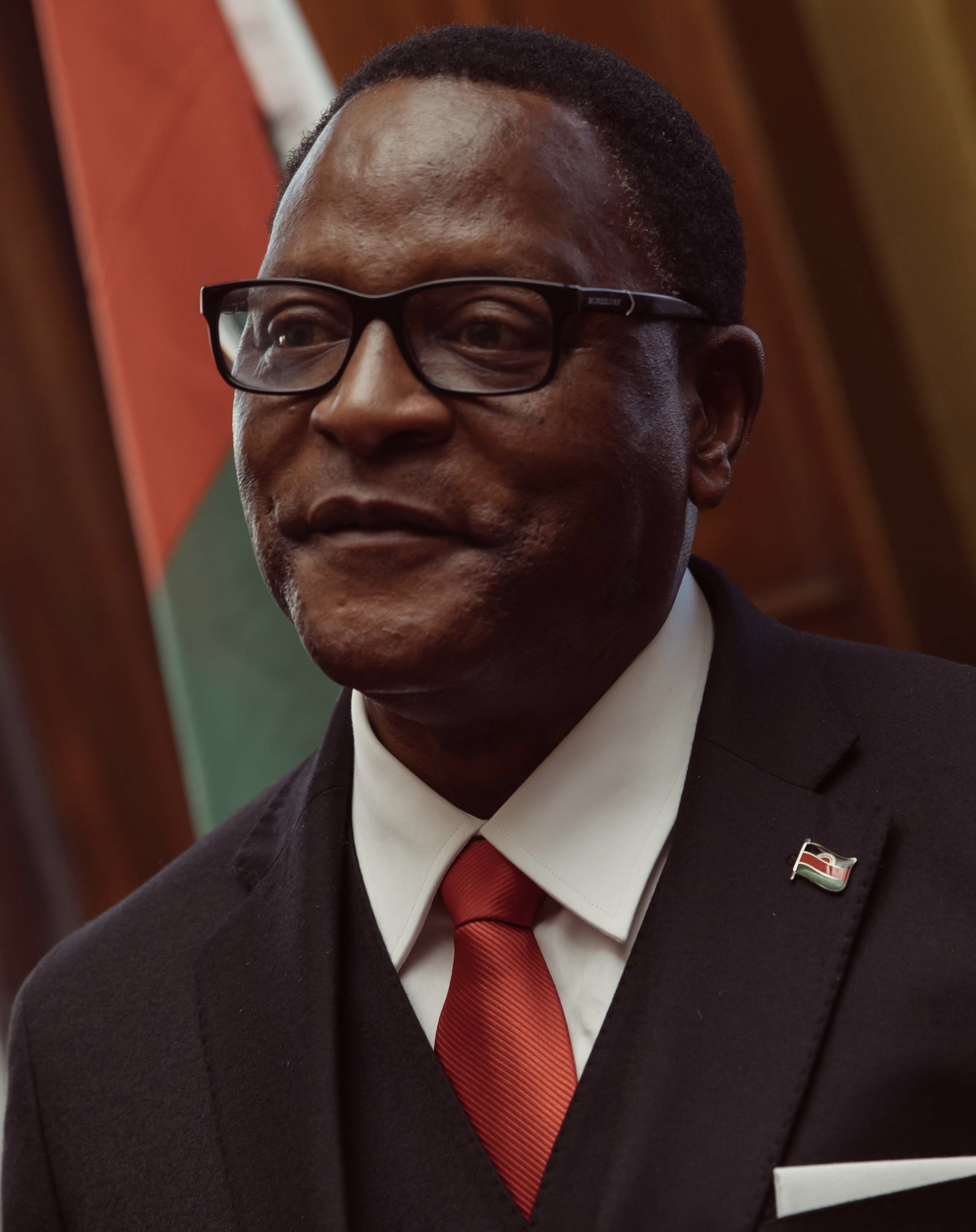
Candidate	Peter Mutharika	Lazarus Chakwera
Party	DPP	MCP
Running mate	Jane Ansah	Vitumbiko Mumba
Popular vote	3,035,249	1,765,170
Percentage	56.76%	33.01%
- Results by region (left) and district (right)
President before election
Lazarus Chakwera
Malawi Congress Party
Elected President
Peter Mutharika
DPP
- Legislative election
- All 229 seats in the National Assembly; 115 seats needed for a majority
Party	Leader	Vote %	Seats	+/–
DPP	Peter Mutharika	25.74	78	+16
MCP	Lazarus Chakwera	20.82	52	−3
UDF	Atupele Muluzi	5.01	4	−10
UTM	Dalitso Kabambe	3.22	8	+4
PP	Joyce Banda	1.32	3	−2
AFORD	Enoch Chihana	1.06	3	+2
PDP	Kondwani Nankhumwa	0.63	1	New
FP	Khumbo Kachali	0.20	1	+1
NDP	Frank Mwenifumbo	0.17	1	New
Independents	–	41.52	73	+18
This lists parties that won seats. See the complete results below.

General elections were held in Malawi on 16 September 2025 to elect the president, the 229 members of the National Assembly and 509 local government councillors.

The presidential election resulted in a victory for former president Peter Mutharika of the Democratic Progressive Party, who received 57% of the vote. Incumbent president Lazarus Chakwera of the Malawi Congress Party finished second with 33% of the vote.

== Background ==
The election was the second conducted under the two-round constitutional threshold introduced after the annulment of the 2019 Malawian general election and the subsequent fresh presidential election the following year that brought Lazarus Chakwera to power. In July 2024, the United Transformation Movement (UTM) withdrew from the governing Tonse Alliance, leaving the Malawi Congress Party (MCP) to contest the elections on its own.

== Electoral system ==
The president of Malawi is elected using a two-round system. Should no candidate secure an absolute majority in the first round, a run-off is held within 30 days. Members of the National Assembly are elected in single-member constituencies by first-past-the-post voting.

According to the Malawi Electoral Commission, 7.2 million voters were enrolled after the three registration phases, with women constituting 57% of the electorate. At 65%, the number of eligible voters who enrolled was less from the 80% recorded in 2019.

== Parties and alliances ==
- Malawi Congress Party (MCP) – governing party of President Chakwera; running without the UTM following the collapse of the Tonse Alliance in 2024.
- Democratic Progressive Party (DPP) – main opposition party; endorsed former president Peter Mutharika as its presidential candidate in August 2024.
- People's Party (PP) – led by former president Joyce Banda, who relaunched her national campaign in June 2025.
- United Democratic Front (UDF) – headed by Atupele Muluzi, which has indicated it may field its own ticket if no opposition alliance is formed.
- United Transformation Movement (UTM) – Following the death of founder Saulos Chilima, Vice-President Michael Usi became interim leader as per the party's constitution. He initially expressed interest in leading the party, but did not contest at the November 2024 convention, where Dalitso Kabambe was elected as the new party leader.

== Candidates ==
=== Declared ===
- Lazarus Chakwera – was the incumbent president; endorsed by the MCP in August 2024. His running mate was Vitumbiko Mumba, the former minister of trade and industry and former labour minister, who was chosen despite MCP constitutional norms that typically favour the First Deputy President.
- Peter Mutharika – former president (2014–2020); nominated by the DPP. His running mate was Jane Ansah, the former Malawi Electoral Commission chairperson.
- Joyce Banda – former president (2012–2014); announced her candidacy on 23 June 2025. Her running mate was Khumbo Kachali, her former vice‑president during her 2012–2014 term.
- Dalitso Kabambe – former governor of the Reserve Bank of Malawi and candidate of the UTM party. His running mate was Matthews Mtumbuka.
- Atupele Muluzi – UDF president. His running mate was Dr. Rex Kalolo.

== Campaign ==
The official campaign period began on 14 July 2025 at the Bingu International Conference Centre (BICC) in Lilongwe, with activities continuing through 14 September, two days before polling on 16 September 2025, according to the MEC election calendar.

=== Presidential debates ===
The Presidential Debates Taskforce, chaired by MISA Malawi, organised debates ahead of the 2025 general election with support from the National Democratic Institute. The first debate was held on 21 August 2025 at the BICC and broadcast nationally. A second debate was rescheduled to 9 September 2025. President Lazarus Chakwera and former president Peter Mutharika did not participate.

=== Peace initiative by the Public Affairs Committee ===
On 8 September 2025, the Public Affairs Committee (PAC) held a National Day of Prayers and Peace Declaration signing at the BICC in Lilongwe. The event brought together several presidential candidates, including President Lazarus Chakwera, Joyce Banda, Atupele Muluzi, and Dalitso Kabambe, who pledged to promote peaceful elections.

The gathering was marked by gestures of unity. Peter Mutharika and Michael Usi's absence drew criticism. PAC chairperson Patrick Thawale stressed that the declaration would help manage disputes during and after the elections.

== Opinion polls ==
Opinion polling was conducted by the Institute of Public Opinion Research (IPOR Malawi) ahead of the election. The survey results, including those from July and August 2025, are summarised in the table below.

Polling firm	Fieldwork date	Sample size	Mutharika	Chakwera	Kabambe	Muluzi	Banda	Undecided	None	Lead
2025 general election	16 September 2025	5,502,982	56.8	33	4	1.9	1.6			23.8
IPOR	27 August 2025	–	41	31	6	3	2	11	–	10
IPOR	20 July 2025	–	43	26	5	2	1	12	6	17
2020 presidential election	23 June 2020	4,445,699	39.92	59.34	–	–	–	–	–	19.42

Another poll conducted by Afrobarometer in August 2024 showed that 43% of respondents supported the Democratic Progressive Party, 29% the Malawi Congress Party, 7% the United Transformation Movement, and 2% the United Democratic Front.

== Conduct ==
Civil society and media advocates such as MISA Malawi have called for unrestricted press freedom and safety for journalists, citing prior instances of intimidation during electoral periods. In June 2025, a rally calling for the resignation of top officials of the Malawi Electoral Commission (MEC) was attacked by masked, machete-wielding men. MEC engaged six international observer missions, undertook gender‑sensitive and risk‑management training, and facilitated party briefings on voter roll verification to reinforce preparedness and credibility.

On 29 August 2025, MEC completed the accreditation of election observers for the 16 September general election, approving 19 international observers and 40 local observers.

On 27 August 2025, MEC conducted a dry-run of its Results Management System (RMS) ahead of the general election. The exercise, held at the national tally centre in Lilongwe and in selected constituencies, aimed to test the speed, accuracy, and security of results transmission. The test revealed some challenges, including network glitches in Blantyre and Lilongwe that delayed the transmission of results. MEC acknowledged the issues but stated that the system's integrity remained intact and pledged to resolve the problems before polling day.

=== Results management and observer concerns ===
In their preliminary report, international and regional observer missions, including the European Union and Southern African Development Community, urged MEC to ensure transparency in the management of election results. The missions, along with several civil society groups, expressed concern about delays in publishing partial results and called for safeguarding election data and materials against tampering or loss.

On 18 September 2025, some political party representatives raised concerns after tally kits from districts including Nkhata Bay, Luchenza, and Kasungu arrived at the national tally centre in Lilongwe without proper security seals. The handover was briefly halted, with MEC pledging to investigate; it later resumed after parties received printouts from the devices for verification.

On 21 September, MEC chairperson Annabel Mtalimanja cautioned political parties against making unverified claims of victory during the tallying process, saying that premature declarations can erode public trust and threaten national peace.

=== Irregularities and investigations ===
On 19 September, the MCP said it had found evidence of irregularities in the vote count in 13 of Malawi's 28 districts. Separately, police arrested eight election data entry clerks in the Lilongwe area on suspicion of "manipulating data". An investigation was also launched into the alleged suicide attempt of an election returning officer who had offered bribes in exchange for manipulating the election results. Four domestic broadcasters also stopped live dashboards of their unofficial voting tallies without explanation that same day.

On 20 September, United Democratic Front (UDF) president and presidential candidate Atupele Muluzi claimed there was vote‐rigging in the party's stronghold districts, citing Mangochi and Balaka as some of the areas where serious irregularities occurred. He also alleged that many UDF monitors were directed to leave polling centers and told to return only after results had already been tallied in order to sign the official record sheets. He called for investigations into the matter and urged that all votes cast be properly accounted for.

Civil society organisations, through the Civil Society Elections Integrity Forum (CSEIF), on 20 September called for a speedy and transparent investigation into the recent arrests of electoral officials and clerks in Lilongwe Nkhoma Constituency. Separate inquiries were also reported in Mangochi, Chikwawa, Blantyre, Machinga, and Rumphi, highlighting the broader scope of concern. In a related incident, another presiding officer in Chikwawa allegedly attempted suicide after failing to reconcile manual and electronic tallies. Observers warned that unresolved issues across these cases could undermine public trust in the electoral process.

On 21 September, MCP presidential runningmate Vitumbiko Mumba claimed during a press briefing that three men at Jenda roadblock had been following him for several days from the Mzuzu area with the intention of attacking him. However, Inspector General of Police Merlyn Yolamu stated that the police were not aware of the alleged incident. In the same briefing, MCP spokesperson Jessie Kabwila also alleged that during vote counting in some polling centres, the party's monitors were told to leave, with some reportedly being chased away and others injured.

On 24 September, before announcing the winner, the commission stated that it had addressed all complaints received from political parties and stakeholders during and after the voting process, including those related to vote counting, data entry, and monitor access at polling centres. MEC chairperson Annabel Mtalimanja confirmed that investigations and corrective actions were carried out where necessary, and the official presidential results were gazetted on the same day to formalize the outcome of the election.

== Results ==
=== President ===
Initial results suggested that former president Peter Mutharika of the Democratic Progressive Party was leading in several areas, including the lakeshore districts of Nkhata Bay and Mangochi, in the presidential election. Official tallies were still awaited from the Malawi Electoral Commission. Despite this, both the MCP and the DPP claimed victory on 17 September. From 19 September, the commission began releasing official results, starting with four councils, among them Luchenza municipality and Likoma.

On 18 September 2025 independent candidate Phunziro Mvula conceded defeat, stating that he accepted the outcome and pledged to run again in 2030. The following day, Smart Swira also conceded defeat and urged Malawians to accept the results. On 20 September, Kondwani Nankhumwa of the People's Development Party (PDP) and independent candidate Adil James Chilungo likewise conceded defeat, with Nankhumwa acknowledging that the preliminary results did not favour his party. On 21 September, UTM presidential candidate Dalitso Kabambe conceded defeat and congratulated Peter Mutharika and the DPP, saying the unofficial results reflected the will of Malawians and urged a peaceful transfer of power. These concessions were made before the commission had officially announced the winner of the presidential election.

On 23 September, partial results from 24 of Malawi's 36 electoral councils showed Mutharika leading the presidential vote with about 66% of valid ballots counted, with Chakwera trailing significantly. Former president Bakili Muluzi publicly asked Chakwera to accept the likely outcome. The Malawi Council of Churches also appealed to Chakwera to concede defeat gracefully, noting that the electoral "table cannot change" in his favour.

President Chakwera conceded defeat in a televised address on 24 September 2025, several hours before the commission had announced final results. At that point, only 24 of the 36 electoral councils were declared, yet Chakwera acknowledged that his opponent had achieved an insurmountable lead and urged Malawians to support a peaceful transition.

Some analysts interpreted Mutharika's strong showing in the presidential contest as partly the product of a protest vote against the incumbent, citing public dissatisfaction over economic mismanagement, scarcity of goods, and weak decision-making by Chakwera's government. Experts also noted that votes that might otherwise have gone to UTM were diverted to Mutharika, reflecting strategic voting dynamics.

Candidate	Running mate	Party	Votes	%
Peter Mutharika	Jane Ansah	Democratic Progressive Party	3,035,249	56.76
Lazarus Chakwera	Vitumbiko Mumba	Malawi Congress Party	1,765,170	33.01
Dalitso Kabambe	Matthews Mtumbuka	United Transformation Movement	211,413	3.95
Atupele Muluzi	Rex Kalolo	United Democratic Front	102,744	1.92
Joyce Banda	Khumbo Kachali	People's Party	86,106	1.61
Akwame Bandawe	Asiyatu Abuli	Anyamata Atsikana Azimayi Party	40,052	0.75
Thokozani Banda	Vera Kaludzu	Independent	22,614	0.42
Kamuzu Chibambo	Chris Bullah	People's Transformation Party	17,274	0.32
Michael Usi	Grace Nazitwere	Odya Zake Alibe Mlandu Party	16,922	0.32
Kondwani Nankhumwa	Bertha Ndebele	People's Development Party	12,251	0.23
Phunziro Mvula	Cydrack Mkwanda	Independent	9,378	0.18
Cosmas Chipojola	Memory Naveko	Independent	8,638	0.16
Adil Chilungo	Mary Mwalukuwo	Independent	8,462	0.16
Frank Mwenifumbo	Chikondi Mpokosa	National Development Party	5,354	0.10
Jordan Sauti	Timothy Kaendera	Patriotic Citizens Party	2,196	0.04
Milward Tobias	Henry Mdebwe	Independent	2,086	0.04
Smart Swira	Jonathan Matonga	Independent	1,848	0.03
Total			5,347,757	100.00
Valid votes			5,347,757	97.18
Invalid/blank votes			155,225	2.82
Total votes			5,502,982	100.00
Registered voters/turnout			7,203,390	76.39
Source: Malawi Electoral Commission

=== National Assembly ===
The commission began releasing official parliamentary results on 29 September, starting with 13 of the 36 electoral councils. Three constituencies, Mzimba South East and Nkhata Bay Central – were withheld due to the need to examine voided votes, while in Nkhotakota Liwaladzi the parliamentary election was postponed following a court order. On the same day, the commission also announced that it had nullified the parliamentary results for the Lilongwe Mtandire – Mtsiliza constituency over irregularities.

On 30 September, the commission announced results for 224 constituencies, with the DPP winning the largest share of seats. It also pledged to conduct parliamentary by-elections in four constituencies where voting had been nullified or not completed. In Lilongwe Chilobwe constituency, the commission had earlier declared MCP's Lawrence Chakakala Chaziya elected unopposed after no other candidate was nominated, bringing the total constituencies to 229 as required.

The number of women in parliament increased from 40 to 48.

Party	Votes	%	Seats	+/–
Democratic Progressive Party	1,351,820	25.74	78	+16
Malawi Congress Party	1,093,646	20.82	52	-3
United Transformation Movement	263,164	5.01	8	+4
United Democratic Front	169,307	3.22	4	-6
People's Party	69,079	1.32	3	-2
Alliance for Democracy	55,490	1.06	3	+2
People's Development Party	33,134	0.63	1	New
Odya Zake Alibe Mlandu Party	10,818	0.21	0	New
Freedom Party	10,579	0.20	1	+1
National Democratic Party	8,712	0.17	1	New
Nationalist Patriotic Party	1,745	0.03	0	New
Liberation for Economic Freedom Party	1,210	0.02	0	New
People's Progressive Movement	744	0.01	0	0
Patriotic Citizens Party	666	0.01	0	New
Solidarity Alliance	610	0.01	0	New
National Congress	246	0.00	0	New
Malawi Forum for Unity and Development	229	0.00	0	New
People's Transformation Party	183	0.00	0	0
Assembly for Democracy and Development	80	0.00	0	New
Independents	2,181,144	41.52	73	+18
Vacant			5	–
Total	5,252,606	100.00	229	+36
Valid votes	5,252,606	98.47		
Invalid/blank votes	81,806	1.53		
Total votes	5,334,412	100.00		
Registered voters/turnout	7,001,993	76.18		
Source: Malawi Electoral Commission

==== Results by constituency ====
Results by constituency
Code	Constituency	DPP	MCP	UTM	UDF	PP	AFORD	PDP	Odya Zake	FP	NDP	NPP	LEFP	PPM	PCP	SA	NC	MAFUNDE	PETRA	ADD	Ind.	Invalid	Registered
001	Chitipa North	916	3,228	296		520					83										5,311	89	14,485
002	Chitipa Central	653	3,934	270		49	2,695														6,899	65	18,158
003	Chitipa East	599	5,205	548		50															7,331	80	16,195
004	Chitipa Chendo	889	933	5,981		515															4,989	80	17,370
005	Chitipa South	1,894	1,068																		12,820	106	20,772
006	Karonga Songwe	2,458	6,506								37										3,608	103	19,238
007	Karonga Lufilya	2,366	4,086	2,499		228	2,500														1,949; 1,026; 270	139	22,640
008	Karonga Central	2,407	2,204	1,117							7,802										62	147	20,657
009	Karonga Nyungwe	6,522	6,058	6,985	333																	146	29,747
010	Karonga South	1,056	3,319	193		17,198	271								85							132	30,148
011	Karonga Town	1,632	9,434	4,835			236														1,892	158	26,702
012	Rumphi North	11,028	4,034	933		135	1,340				100											151	24,157
013	Rumphi West	498	1,636	649		483	453														11,109; 1,912	133	22,419
014	Rumphi East	2,154	1,938				5,787			66											4,581; 1,510; 347	125	23,977
015	Rumphi Central	1,020	2,157	3,450			6,822		47												2,797; 237; 143	148	24,383
016	Mzimba North	3,599	3,085	10,338			958							53							1,292; 310; 105	203	29,700
017	Mzimba West	2,403	5,698	228		421	457														8,584; 724	206	28,172
018	Mzimba Kafukule	1,795	565	265			507		81												7,220; 5,716; 46	171	22,592
019	Mzimba North East	4,041	14,964	1,213		69															1,685	276	32,996
020	Mzimba Central	1,656		680																	13,042; 2,673; 1,607; 530	292	30,170
021	Mzimba East	1,621	4,599	3,768			4,063														8,688; 1,393; 725; 234; 201; 192	256	33,200
022	Mzimba Hora	6,486	6,092	1,418				286		237						610					3,575	252	26,368
023	Mzimba South West	5,133	2,249	3,690						5,674											2,539	300	25,738
024	Mzimba Solola	5,874	4,742	2,082	388		979			1,072											4,432; 703; 368	276	29,107
025	Mzimba Perekezi	3,850	4,193	974			4,623	310		599											3,413; 1,127	187	26,140
026	Mzimba South		22,137	1,872								265										239	31,818
027	Mzimba South East	2,573	4,446	963	113	4,365	134														2,760; 1,582	142	23,482
028	Mzimba Luwerezi	840	1,972	1,783																	10,198; 5,548; 2,485; 926; 916	184	32,080
029	Nkhata Bay North	4,670	2,604	1,947		133	199															64	13,830
030	Nkhata Bay Mpamba	3,685	647			111	248		88	79											6,871; 43	113	17,280
031	Nkhata Bay Central	5,385	2,539	497			67														5,377	76	21,115
032	Nkhata Bay West	3,919	1,367	2,703		598	497	363		782											1,868; 508; 207; 129	173	18,504
033	Nkhata Bay Chintheche	2,797	464	2,844		3,395	241	389													1,193	164	17,121
034	Nkhata Bay South	1,755	1,906	3,614		341															2,245; 1,220; 1,132; 182	219	19,556
035	Mzuzu City North	3,451	4,988			306	2,467		1,048												3,744; 880	179	23,183
036	Mzuzu City South West	2,217	1,847	1,552			164														10,565; 182	132	22,711
037	Mzuzu City South East	2,472	5,362	2,528	365		263												183		8,136; 3,108; 203	207	30,735
038	Likoma Islands	3,172	2,458			97															1,136	68	8,664
039	Nkhotakota Dwangwa	4,384	9,898	178	275																3,048	264	25,896
040	Nkhotakota Liwaladzi	Election not held																					
041	Nkhotakota Central	4,424	5,187		285																7,099; 4,360; 3,815; 1,540; 708; 223	472	41,403
042	Nkhotakota Chia	1,787	10,441	244																	5,794; 3,272; 2,023; 530; 432	489	36,091
043	Nkhotakota Mkhula	3,418	12,661		154																8,494; 2,445; 1,083; 162	537	43,278
044	Kasungu North	4,010	10,517			11,537																322	36,823
045	Kasungu North West	1,648	7,685	4,217																	5,371; 2,969	319	33,114
046	Kasungu West	4,098	8,101	131			463	1,912													6,380; 3,583; 1,514; 694	383	40,680
047	Kasungu North North East	7,635	7,202				320														2,989; 1,722; 1,090	297	32,201
048	Kasungu East	1,963	9,836			141															11,092	262	36,105
049	Kasungu North East		10,101	381																	9,008; 930; 284	317	32,782
050	Kasungu Central		13,194				1,769		1,552												6,617; 1,118	323	36,932
051	Kasungu South East		4,724			4,302															13,947	275	31,910
052	Kasungu South West		6,310	411			504														9,206; 2,409; 1,728; 340	354	31,293
053	Kasungu South		12,349	232																	11,817; 641	322	33,201
054	Kasungu Municipality	4,235	3,779	294			202														7,109; 1,528; 1,233	198	25,645
055	Ntchisi North	6,646	10,494	140				170													2,470	219	28,409
056	Ntchisi West		5,884					76													10,584; 1,495; 1,210; 709; 168	325	28,257
057	Ntchisi Central East	1,579	12,894	1,023																	1,780; 1,601; 57	271	26,318
058	Ntchisi East	889	1,906	193																	7,269; 5,480; 4281	273	27,608
059	Ntchisi South	35	3,839	1,245																	19,141	311	31,207
060	Dowa Ngala	494	5,621	238																	6,200; 3,944; 3,445; 1,638; 1,156; 244	380	33,954
061	Dowa Kasangadzi		18,006																		5,980	259	33,153
062	Dowa Mphudzu		12,068	523																	6,944; 4,708	331	34,205
063	Dowa Central		5,646																		19,085	306	34,770
064	Dowa Mndolera		7,346																		14,381; 2,816; 177	350	30,744
065	Dowa North East		12,142	1,059																	10,343	392	33,296
066	Dowa West		13,198	117																	14,357	526	34,542
067	Dowa East	3,997	25,111																			493	40,731
068	Dowa Central East		5,587																		11,592; 1,139; 620; 590; 163; 115	369	28,104
069	Dowa South East		3,997																		26,756; 546	519	43,796
070	Mchinji North East	1,311	15,536																		4,883; 2,268	286	34,482
071	Mchinji North	2,351	11,273	1,159																	6,782; 6,281	580	42,421
072	Mchinji East	602	7,209	348																	14,312; 5,082	368	36,586
073	Mchinji West	1,953	7,646		981																8,041; 869	234	28,932
074	Mchinji Central East	4,040	21,903	1,798				1,366														535	44,768
075	Mchinji South West		10,809	531																	10,557; 707	459	33,041
076	Mchinji South		6,582	172																	10,496; 5,810	265	32,375
077	Salima North	4,323	14,285	459																	3,544	464	36,361
078	Salima Central West	1,502	9,016																		13,895	381	35,222
079	Salima Central East	4,935	3,072	177	698																4,717; 1,301; 1,160; 579; 178	363	23,148
080	Salima Central	6,903	8,434	1,104	265																3,224; 872	351	29,633
081	Salima South Linthipe	4,580	5,407	405																	5,985; 3,535; 1,439	538	33,550
082	Salima South	4,535	3,378	377	516																4,717; 3,923; 2,180; 176	284	28,671
083	Lilongwe Chilobwe		Unopposed																			—	—
084	Lilongwe Mphande		10,116																		16,561; 7,002; 3,571; 2,191; 1,419; 952; 348	896	55,414
085	Lilongwe Mude		32,079						1,016												9,113; 859; 734	881	54,205
086	Lilongwe Demera	346	15,969																		9,724; 5,534; 5,329; 2,342; 1,328; 423	651	51,447
087	Lilongwe Chiwamba		26,474	932																	10,409; 1,889; 871; 827	736	55,070
088	Lilongwe East	290	6,692																		11,405; 532; 519; 90	587	25,453
089	Lilongwe Mapuyu North	409	7,450	774																	20,234; 7,032; 1,977; 349	801	52,089
090	Lilongwe Machenga		11,273																		8,263; 3,839	448	34,470
091	Lilongwe Nkhoma		9,421			278		220													13,036; 1,659; 736	804	36,724
092	Lilongwe Likuni	1,355	11,250																		18,649; 3,046	517	49,976
093	Lilongwe Central	5,765	12,219	2,645					481												7,868	697	44,189
094	Lilongwe Mpenu	5,736	9,071						444												4,550; 2,113; 1,393	470	34,125
095	Lilongwe Mapuyu South		13,557																		12,579; 3,452; 2,056	499	44,940
096	Lilongwe Nyanja	564	20,921	135																	6,048	667	35,292
097	Lilongwe Msozi	676	19,054																		9,377	627	37,074
098	Lilongwe Bunda	1,539	12,689	870				101													6,858; 4,895	479	39,829
099	Lilongwe Phirilanjuzi	718	11,048																		9,109; 2,149; 932; 671; 397	548	38,804
100	Lilongwe Msinja South		15,132																		11,185; 2,166	625	43,351
101	Lilongwe Msinja North		11,659												211						11,507	365	36,273
102	Lilongwe City Lumbadzi	3,545	9,426	1,071			568														7,443; 2,722; 1,504; 692; 614	647	39,506
103	Lilongwe City Dzenza	6,096	8,714	1,687																	3,980; 2,546; 1,220; 850; 719; 355	351	35,451
104	Lilongwe City Centre	13,716	15,002	3,200		260	366	406	530													663	46,800
105	Lilongwe City Chipala-Nafisi	8,117	6,999	821			369														4,436; 2,015; 530; 336	367	32,199
106	Lilongwe City Nankhaka	6,582	5,860	2,522							65						246				4,438; 350	280	26,981
107	Lilongwe City Mtandire-Mtsiriza	Election not held																					
108	Lilongwe City Bwaila	Election not held																					
109	Lilongwe City Masintha	5,129	6,000	3,718	1,657			1,550													4,340; 3,860; 541	411	34,962
110	Lilongwe City M'Buka	7,055	4,747	2,094																	3,291; 1,307; 719	363	25,543
111	Lilongwe City Mlodza	4,240	6,911	1,279	745	115															5,139; 5,017	273	30,751
112	Lilongwe City Kamphuno	5,871	5,871	3,229				279	267	265					130						6,042; 1,114	346	32,473
113	Lilongwe City Ngwenya	8,090	8,185	3,457					627												1,194; 341	446	31,093
114	Dedza Mayani		11,790		1,942																14,199; 2,005	490	42,103
115	Dedza Mlunduni		13,448	244	1,101																11,557; 1,786	831	38,396
116	Dedza Kasina		13,326																		8,200; 5,675; 2,295	492	40,486
117	Dedza Mtakataka	Election not held																					
118	Dedza Linthipe	499	8,190	360	340																17,020; 4,633	684	40,876
119	Dedza Boma	1,662	6,116	1,263	638																6,174; 5,843	313	30,918
120	Dedza Golomoti	3,241	3,983		813	170															10,570; 4,205	502	32,851
121	Dedza Chikoma		13,029																		6,823; 5,332; 912; 182	562	36,670
122	Dedza Mphunzi		7,040																		9,338; 5,376; 400	408	33,565
123	Dedza Dzalanyama		7,271																		11,615; 4,044	449	37,443
124	Ntcheu North	8,305	1,768	1,714					1,775			670									2,344; 177; 140	229	21,313
125	Ntcheu Bwanje	4,851	2,008	1,882								92									3,251; 3,166; 2,760; 1,918; 1,491; 347	357	27,376
126	Ntcheu North West	2,755	867	1,188																	5,819; 4,033; 781	238	19,279
127	Ntcheu Central East	3,986	294	526			93														5,596; 3,456; 2,323; 1178	306	22,708
128	Ntcheu Central	4,750	318	5,553			91														7,208; 1,517	234	24,088
129	Ntcheu Dzonzi Mvai	4,277	584	447																	4,579; 4,053; 189; 175	213	17,663
130	Ntcheu Central Central East	10,634	939	1,034																	1,927; 443; 358; 86	200	18,332
131	Ntcheu South	4,409	1,347	11,828																	197	222	22,115
132	Mangochi North	8,820	6,069		459	558															7,413; 275	434	31,307
133	Mangochi Lutende	7,488	413	705	6,877	3,900	626	236													1,135; 1,004	467	27,777
134	Mangochi East	6,538	310		5,814	1,090															5,944; 4,353	516	33,243
135	Mangochi Monkey Bay	11,126	17,971	399	194																686	419	41,412
136	Mangochi West	15,437	574	898																	4,495; 2,778; 282	243	31,923
137	Mangochi Central	11,802	794		2,575																9,629; 427	369	33,149
138	Mangochi North East	11,063	730	392	3,354	208															3,812; 1,942; 1,372; 1,142; 1,053	539	33,078
139	Mangochi Masongola	10,708	842	537	6,584	167															8,486; 1,679	624	37,834
140	Mangochi South West	7,549	159	4,602	3,566	817															5,304; 3,614; 2,406; 918	535	37,599
141	Mangochi South	8,704	771	5,615	2,854	144			474												10,831; 172	558	39,172
142	Mangochi Malombe	8,843	479	6,035	2,716	344	508														1,894	543	28,021
143	Mangochi Nkungulu	5,615	533	1,482	12,536			1,311													3,306; 1,688	721	36,088
144	Mangochi Municipality	11,340	3,087	746	5,946	108															4,153; 2,165; 430	418	37,840
145	Machinga North East	8,635	675	635	3,084	376			219												9,055; 2,849; 1,050; 571; 464; 443; 189	518	36,344
146	Machinga South East	4,090	350	2,707	1,166	967	919					515									7,703; 5,112; 2,020; 1,611; 1,605; 252	705	36,587
147	Machinga Central	10,461	358	228	1,129			67					1,089								7,437	243	25,881
148	Machinga East	8,098	345	2,303	15,766	397			231						240							551	33,928
149	Machinga Mikoko	5,438	745	973	2,362	2,189	962														4,388; 2,984; 2,251; 772; 451; 289	642	29,665
150	Machinga Central East	14,795	1,176	1,897	990				1,008												2,537; 1,470; 515; 480	437	30,496
151	Machinga Likwenu	5,116	541	319	7,728																4,541; 1,737; 883; 287	245	26,344
152	Machinga South	11,824	569	1,473	6,222	408	1,429	252	346												3,414; 1,091; 224	422	33,931
153	Balaka Ulongwe	13,603			3,280																8,485; 834	348	33,953
154	Balaka Bwaila	4,161	238	980	642																13,574; 1,174; 930; 788; 546; 525; 363	373	29,770
155	Balaka Ngwangwa	14,283	819	1,151	572													229			8,039	276	31,743
156	Balaka Rivirivi	12,964	345	732	852			62													12,007; 4,217; 651; 146	452	39,526
157	Balaka Mulunguzi	8,162	270	266	1,839			160													8,445; 4,079; 4,019; 553; 187	262	35,035
158	Zomba Malosa	20,419	475	374	580	3,338		176	286		625										385	325	35,316
159	Zomba Nsondole	4,459	1,399	459	408	174	151	192													8,186; 4,360; 2,250; 2,133; 654	392	29,877
160	Zomba Chingale	8,491	292		5,113	140															5,934; 4,136; 1,032; 476; 432; 345	409	32,640
161	Zomba Likangala	6,505		404		349															23,683; 425; 399; 355	481	38,934
162	Zomba Changalume	9,366		280	249	426															6,856; 3,991; 2,737; 840; 212; 181	325	29,657
163	Zomba Ntonya	3,694	1,259	324	3,927	175		277													16,205; 1,202; 270; 148	386	32,307
164	Zomba Matiya	13,729		219		3,234															11,783; 667; 163	473	36,366
165	Zomba Thondwe	15,044	517	1,031	428	855		109													5,440; 51	261	28,038
166	Zomba Chikomwe	14,407	266	3,785	551																916; 876; 677; 493	307	26,293
167	Neno North	11,305	1,710																		800; 248	131	17,755
168	Neno East	3,406	667	1,199																	2,797; 2,663; 1,791; 1,086; 825; 707; 147; 85	163	18,651
169	Neno South	4,841												691							3,806; 2,204	133	14,420
170	Blantyre North	13,570	1,306	5,996	2,672																	250	29,542
171	Blantyre Central	4,966	1,059	487	1,450																8,016; 3,946; 1821	302	26,788
172	Blantyre West	Election not held																					
173	Blantyre North East	7,342	456	503	5,923																13,651; 2,759	385	37,259
174	Blantyre South West	8,606	562	564	212																9,552; 1,983; 371; 129; 121; 105; 52	350	26,772
175	Blantyre South East	6,765	464																		9,113; 2,245; 1278; 562	377	24,439
176	Zomba City North	13,803	995	2,543	6,176																	189	30,239
177	Zomba City South	17,594	2,800	500		230																196	27,011
178	Mwanza Central		509	9,233																	3,881; 2,222; 2,215	227	24,367
179	Mwanza West	4,349	6,360	363																	3,200; 1,867; 1,330; 1,210; 371; 261	388	26,678
180	Phalombe North	10,899	243	700		131															9,179; 3,617; 840; 185	295	30,802
181	Phalombe North East	24,941	310	462																	6,329; 2,099; 629; 241	370	42,433
182	Phalombe Machemba	6,242	255	175		76															14,355; 11,086	223	37,788
183	Phalombe South	20,216	198	484				450													2,678; 237	243	28,502
184	Phalombe East	10,245	305	61	255																9,377; 2,696; 1,846; 106	291	31,080
185	Chiradzulu Nyungwe	20,089	238	611			485														1,296; 779; 366; 248; 179	291	28,650
186	Chiradzulu Masanjala	16,117	228	261	446	267	204														3,974; 1,180; 1,160; 1,035; 532; 384; 217; 169	453	31,127
187	Chiradzulu Thumbwe	19,304	210	595																	3,116; 2,495	372	30,021
188	Chiradzulu Nguludi	14,392	1,007	4,838																	2,794; 671; 443; 373	299	28,152
189	Chiradzulu Midima	8,340	136	457																	5,884; 4,538; 3,337; 2010	351	28,928
190	Mulanje North	14,584	242	2,210				217													4,916; 242; 170	368	26,928
191	Mulanje West	7,658	198	7,838																	7,402; 3,038	279	31,070
192	Mulanje Pasani	3,837	99	220				183													8,534; 6,788; 2,265; 2,104	272	28,886
193	Mulanje South West	9,887	287	3,047				1,997													3,884; 1,987; 596	486	27,454
194	Mulanje Limbuli	9,729	176	75																	18,862; 3,633	472	39,743
195	Mulanje South	22,142	980	1,205																	1,270	346	31,127
196	Mulanje Central	4,381	264	384				17,635													5,563	388	35,183
197	Mulanje South East	4,290	71	219																	12,962; 6,911; 1,684; 229; 126	372	32,347
198	Mulanje Bale	13,622	135	265	90			417													3,957; 1,260; 511; 280	508	27,023
199	Blantyre City South Lunzu	8,547	518		136																7,672; 4,974; 1,229; 745; 241; 119	355	30,134
200	Blantyre City Michiru-Chirimba	8,161	353	1,126									121								7,543; 1,022; 803; 101	334	24,117
201	Blantyre City Mapanga-Mpingwe-Mzedi	13,443		684	1,781		278			514											8,597	320	30,476
202	Blantyre City Ndirande Malabada Nyambadwe	6,918		1,267	11,967					1,291											5,299	286	33,058
203	Blantyre City Chilomoni Kabula Nancholi	20,472	4,316	3,595	357																1,472	486	37,250
204	Blantyre City Mbayani-Mussa Magasa	6,081	312	542	5,375			1,667												80	3,291; 120	204	21,291
205	Blantyre City Nkolokoti-Ndirande Matope	7,192	474		1,147		5,908														8,608; 2,807	259	32,245
206	Blantyre City Chichiri-Misesa	12,462	1,718	2,319	2,062																7,423; 2,404	360	35,107
207	Blantyre City Soche-Zingwangwa	10,134	2,372	10,370	951																1,329; 359	181	31,728
208	Blantyre City Chigumula BCA-Club Banana	22,484	641		582																2,195	332	31,125
209	Chikwawa West	6,422	5,306						298												15,729; 1,926	806	40,685
210	Chikwawa North	6,654	5,889	264																	8,248; 2,165; 1924; 1264	459	32,948
211	Chikwawa Central West	14,716	732	514		182	1,788														9,895	573	35,366
212	Chikwawa Central	7,248	1,479	1,485		531															10,186; 6,444; 1,920; 852; 797	583	39,542
213	Chikwawa East	10,390	963	599	5,549	1,242															5,895; 2,005; 428; 170; 42	635	36,534
214	Chikwawa Mkombedzi	12,218	7,687																		7,580; 4,995	706	42,390
215	Chikwawa South	7,018		1,518																	24,885; 180	831	43,302
216	Thyolo Mikolongwe	9,959	566	142																	3,187; 2,573; 2,162; 2,056; 1,581; 204; 86	318	26,352
217	Thyolo Goliati	17,527		346																	4,493; 4,119; 1,286; 1,095; 1,017; 157	490	35,107
218	Thyolo Bvumbwe-Masenjere	11,872	321	341	204																6,401; 6,224; 1,561; 835; 257; 111	409	33,507
219	Thyolo Khonjeni-Mangunda	3,963	270	163				158													19,941	371	29,565
220	Thyolo Central	26,848	366																		3,462	388	36,586
221	Thyolo Thava	32,005	440	918																	1,742	476	41,854
222	Thyolo Masambanjati	5,861	127	1,114			537	101													4,673; 3,139; 2,474; 1,421; 675; 107	348	24,947
223	Thyolo Thekerani	9,583	152	760																	8,404; 1,301; 505	317	25,187
224	Luchenza	2,584	2,524	485				39													1,615; 550; 506; 48	102	10,237
225	Nsanje North	9,911	2,357	145																	8,033; 3,211; 236	440	31,728
226	Nsanje Lalanje	5,714	239	1,784																	13,655; 2,582; 64; 54	462	31,767
227	Nsanje Central	11,478	5,211	523		172															1,525; 183	313	24,507
228	Nsanje South West	3,187	969	201								203									6,328; 5,745; 4,744; 568	434	29,195
229	Nsanje South	7,558	458	169		67	979														7,525; 5,795; 100	317	30,303
Total		1,351,820	1,093,646	263,164	169,307	69,079	55,490	33,134	10,818	10,579	8,712	1,745	1,210	744	666	610	246	229	183	80	2,181,144	81,806	7,001,993

=== Local government councillors ===
On 5 October the commission announced results for 502 wards, with the DPP winning the largest share of seats. It also stated that local government elections had not been conducted in seven wards for various reasons, and that by-elections would be held in due course.

Party	Seats
Democratic Progressive Party	249
Malawi Congress Party	143
United Transformation Movement	14
United Democratic Front	6
People's Party	3
National Development Party	2
Alliance for Democracy	1
Odya Zake Alibe Mlandu Party	1
Independents	83
Total	502
Source: Nation Online

== Aftermath ==
=== Voter turnout and electoral integrity ===
The 2025 general election saw a notable increase in voter turnout, with 5,502,982 individuals casting their ballots, representing 76.4% of the 7.2 million registered voters. This marks a significant rise from the 64.8% turnout in the 2020 election. Analysts attribute this improvement to widespread public dissatisfaction with the prevailing economic conditions and renewed confidence in the electoral process, bolstered by reforms and increased transparency by MEC.

However, the election also experienced a rise in null and void votes. Approximately 155,225 votes were invalidated, accounting for 2.8% of the total votes cast. This figure more than doubles the 1.28% recorded in the 2020 election. Experts suggest that this increase may be due to insufficient voter education and the complexity introduced by having 17 presidential candidates on the ballot, which reduced the size of the voting boxes and potentially led to voter errors.

=== Inauguration and transition of power ===
Peter Mutharika was sworn in as president of Malawi on 4 October 2025 at Kamuzu Stadium in Blantyre, in a ceremony attended by government officials, supporters, and several regional leaders, including Zimbabwean president Emmerson Mnangagwa, Mozambican president Daniel Chapo, and Botswanan president Duma Boko. Outgoing President Lazarus Chakwera did not attend the ceremony; however, the MCP issued a goodwill message wishing Mutharika success.

In his inaugural address, Mutharika acknowledged that he was inheriting a country facing economic challenges such as high inflation, shortages of fuel and food, and debt constraints, and pledged a “tough and painful” return to work rather than promises of “milk and honey".

=== Government formation and appointments ===
Within days of taking office, President Mutharika named Joseph Mwanamveka as his finance minister - a role Mwanamveka had previously held between 2019 and 2020. In addition, he appointed Enoch Chihana as second vice president, George Chaponda as foreign affairs minister and Alfred Gangata as minister of state.

=== Debate over leader of the Opposition ===
With independents having emerged as the single largest bloc in the early unofficial results, some observers and commentators argued that the leader of the Opposition in the National Assembly should have come from among the independent MPs rather than from MCP. This was seen as a possible departure from precedent, given MCP’s traditional role as opposition leader, and was noted as a factor that could influence negotiations over parliamentary leadership roles.

=== Reversal of headquarters relocations ===
On 10 October, President Mutharika issued an executive order reversing the earlier government directive that had moved several parastatal head offices from Blantyre and Zomba to Lilongwe. Under the new order, agencies including the Malawi Communications Regulatory Authority, Malawi Electoral Commission, and Malawi Housing Corporation were instructed to return to their original locations in Blantyre within three months, while the Malawi Prison Service was directed to relocate back to Zomba.

=== Domestic reaction, political significance, and commentary ===
The transition of power in Malawi has been widely noted as a positive example of democratic turnover in a region often dominated by long-standing incumbents. Analysts have drawn attention to how the 2025 election was influenced heavily by economic discontent: with inflation persistently high, shortages of essential goods, and donor aid cuts, many voters appeared to use the election as a means to express dissatisfaction with the Chakwera government. Some commentators observed that the result suggests that party support in Malawi is not immutable, and that political comebacks are possible when incumbents mismanage economic or governance challenges.

== Court rulings ==
On 11 September, five days before the polls, the High Court in Blantyre, presided over by Justice Chimbizgani Kacheche (Judicial Review Cause No. 19 of 2025), dismissed an opposition request for an independent audit of MEC’s election management system. The court upheld MEC’s decision to deny the audit but ruled that results could not be announced solely on the basis of electronic transmission and should await the arrival of manual tallies as well.

On 22 September, the High Court in Lilongwe dismissed an application by Madalitso Kazombo (former MCP MP and former Deputy Speaker in the last parliament) seeking permission for a judicial review of the Malawi Electoral Commission's conduct in relation to the elections. The case (Judicial Review Cause No. 61 of 2025), heard by Justice Violet Palikena-Chipao, was dismissed on the grounds of procedural irregularities in the documents submitted, such as typographical errors, incorrect legal citations, unclear arguments and inconsistent facts. The court granted Kazombo liberty to refile with properly prepared documents.

On 23 September, President Chakwera and the governing MCP sought an injunction to restrain MEC from announcing the winner, but the High Court, presided over by Judge Howard Pemba, dismissed the application. However, the court allowed the claimants to pursue a judicial review of the matter, although Chakwera later withdrew the case after conceding defeat.

In the days following the announcement of parliamentary results, at least 83 election petitions were filed by losing candidates in constituencies across the country. These challenges spanned multiple districts, including Machinga, Chikwawa, Dowa, and Kasungu, and contested outcomes in several parliamentary seats. The High Court heard the cases, marking one of the most extensive waves of post-election litigation in Malawi’s recent history.
