= Vice-President of Malawi =

Vice-President of the Republic of Malawi
- Wotsatira wa Mtsogoleri wa Dziko la Malawi (in Chichewa)
- Coat of arms of Malawi.

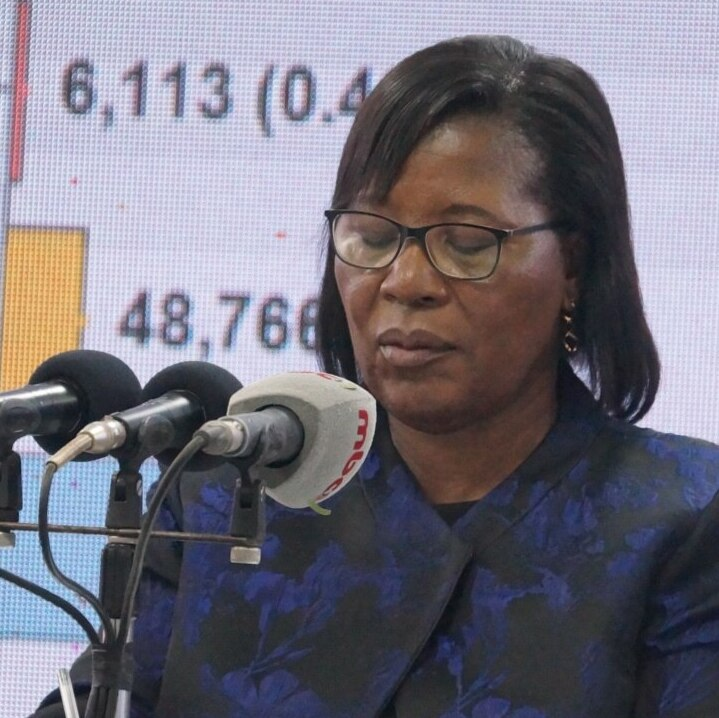
- Incumbent; Jane Ansah since 4 October 2025
- Executive branch of the Malawian Government
- Member of: Cabinet
- Seat: Capital Hill, Lilongwe
- Term length: Five years, renewable once
- Constituting instrument: Constitution of Malawi
- Formation: May 1994
- First holder: Justin Malewezi and Chakufwa Chihana
- Salary: 1 million kwacha per month
- Website: www.ovp.gov.mw

Vice-President of Malawi (Chichewa: Wotsatira wa Mtsogoleri wa Dziko la Malawi; Tumbuka: Wachiŵili kwa Mlongozgi wa charu cha Malaŵi) is the second highest political position in Malawi.

The vice-president is elected on the same ticket with the president. The president can also appoint a second vice-president if they desire. The position was first established in November 1994 to assist the president. However, the office has been mainly ceremonial as its sole purpose is to replace the president in his absence, death, or inability to hold office.

== List of vice presidents of Malawi (1994–present) ==
Political parties

United Democratic Front (UDF)
Democratic Progressive Party (DPP)
People's Party (PP)
United Transformation Movement (UTM)
Malawi Congress Party (MCP)

Symbols

^{†} Died in office

No.	Portrait	Name (Birth–Death)	Elected	Term of office			Political party	President
No.	Portrait	Name (Birth–Death)	Elected	Took office	Left office	Time in office	Political party	President
Dual Vice Presidents (1994–1996)
1		Justin Malewezi (1943–2021)	1994	May 1994	May 1996		UDF	Bakili Muluzi
—		Chakufwa Chihana (1939–2006)	1994	June 1994	May 1996		AFORD	Bakili Muluzi
Sole Vice Presidents (1996–2003)								Bakili Muluzi
1		Justin Malewezi (1943–2021)	1999	May 1996	April 2003		UDF	Bakili Muluzi
Dual Vice Presidents (2003–2004)								Bakili Muluzi
—		Justin Malewezi (1943–2021)	—	April 2003	24 May 2004		UDF	Bakili Muluzi
—		Chakufwa Chihana (1939–2006)	—	April 2003	24 May 2004		AFORD	Bakili Muluzi
Sole Vice Presidents (2004–present)
2		Cassim Chilumpha (born 1959)	2004	24 May 2004	24 May 2009	4 years, 335 days	UDF (2004–2005); DPP (2005–2012)	Bingu wa Mutharika
3		Joyce Banda (born 1950)	2009	24 May 2009	7 April 2012	2 years, 316 days	DPP (2009–2011); People's (2011–2012)	Bingu wa Mutharika
4		Khumbo Kachali (born 1966)	—	10 April 2012	31 May 2014	1 year, 51 days	People's	Joyce Banda
5		Saulos Chilima (1973–2024)	2014	31 May 2014	31 May 2019	5 years, 0 days	DPP (2014–2018); UTM (2018–2019)	Peter Mutharika
6		Everton Chimulirenji (born 1963)	2019	31 May 2019	3 February 2020	248 days	DPP	Peter Mutharika
7		Saulos Chilima (1973–2024)	2020	3 February 2020	10 June 2024^{†}	4 years, 128 days	UTM	Peter Mutharika (Feb–Jun 2020; Lazarus Chakwera (2020–2024)
Office vacant (10–20 June 2024)
8		Michael Usi (born 1968)	—	20 June 2024	4 October 2025	1 year, 106 days	MCP	Lazarus Chakwera
9		Jane Ansah (born 1955)	2025	4 October 2025	Incumbent	1 year, 44 days	DPP	Peter Mutharika
10		Enoch Chihana	2025	21 October 2025	Incumbent	1 year, 27 days	AFORD	Peter Mutharika

== See also ==
- List of current vice presidents
