= Matthews Mtumbuka =

Malawian telecommunications executive, engineer, and politician

- Born: July 29, 1978 (age 47); Rumphi, Malawi
- Education: University of Malawi; University of Oxford
- Alma mater: University of Oxford
- Occupations: Engineer, business executive, politician
- Employer: Malawi National Assembly
- Known for: Expanding internet access for African research institutions; Running mate to 2025 UTM presidential candidate Dalitso Kabambe
- Title: Member of Parliament MP
- Political party: United Transformation Movement
- Website: https://mtumbuka.org

Matthews Mtumbuka (born 29 July 1978) is a Malawian politician and telecommunications engineer and executive, was serving as the Chief Executive Officer (CEO) of the UbuntuNet Alliance in 2019 to 2021 and as Managing Director MD of Helios Towers from 2021 to 2023 when he took early retirement to establish his own business entity Weagle Holdings Ltd. He is a member of the Parliament of Malawi. In 2011, he was elected as a president for Malawi Institute of Engineers during a meeting held in Mangochi District.

He has also held board positions at NBS Bank, NICO Technologies, and the Catholic University of Malawi. He further previously served as Vice Chair of the Council for Mzuzu University and was Board Chair of the Malawi Scotland Partnership.

In July 2025, Matthews Mtumbuka was officially selected as the running mate to UTM presidential candidate Dalitso Kabambe for the 2025 Malawian general election.

== Early life and education ==
Mtumbuka was born in Malawi in 1978. After completing his secondary education, he enrolled at the University of Malawi, where he earned a Bachelor of Science degree in Electrical Engineering with Distinction.

In the early 2000s, he was awarded a Rhodes Scholarship to pursue postgraduate studies in the United Kingdom. He earned his PhD in Communications Systems Engineering from the University of Oxford, where he was affiliated with Hertford College.

== Career ==
Mtumbuka began his career in the Petroleum Industry at Shell UK Ltd in Aberdeen, Scotland in 2006 soon after his PhD from Oxford University. He later joined industry and held various roles in technology leadership and innovation including at NITEL (Malswitch), Airtel, UbuntuNet Alliance and Helios Towers Ltd.

In 2019, Mtumbuka was appointed CEO of the UbuntuNet Alliance, a regional research and education network focused on providing affordable and high-speed internet connectivity to universities and research institutions across Eastern and Southern Africa. Under his leadership, the Alliance expanded its fibre-optic infrastructure and connectivity coverage to multiple countries, with a claim to close the digital divide between Africa and other parts of the world.

He has represented Africa's research and education sector at several global forums, including the Internet Governance Forum and initiatives led by the African Union Commission.

In 2025 Enock Chakufwa Chihana was elected for Rumphi Central Constituency but he was promoted to second vice President. In the by-election that followed Mtumbuka representing the United Transformation Movement was elected in March 2026.

== Advocacy and impact ==
Mtumbuka has been a vocal advocate for investing in African digital infrastructure and building human capital in science, technology, and engineering. His work has had impact on internet accessibility for African scholars and researchers.

== Awards and recognition ==
- Rhodes scholarship for Southern Africa in 2001.
- Recognition from UbuntuNet Alliance and partners for leadership in expanding Africa’s research networks
- Best Science Fair project in the country at National Science Fair awards in 1996.
- Runner up in Old Mutual Mathe Olympiad in 1995

== Personal life ==
Mtumbuka is married to Nancy and they have one child Thumbiko. Outside of his professional work, he mentors young professionals and advocates for science education in Malawi.

== See also ==
- National Research and Education Network
- Internet in Africa
- UbuntuNet Alliance
