= Vitumbiko Mumba =

Malawian politician

Minister of Trade and Industry
- In office 26 February 2025 – 15 September 2025
- President: Lazarus Chakwera
- Preceded by: Sosten Gwengwe
- Succeeded by: George Partridge

Minister of Labour
- In office 12 December 2024 – 26 February 2025
- President: Lazarus Chakwera
- Preceded by: Agnes Nyalonje
- Succeeded by: Peter Dimba

Personal details
- Born: Malawi
- Party: Malawi Congress Party
- Education: Stellenbosch Business School
- Occupation: Politician, public administrator
- Profession: Engineer
- Website: https://www.vitumbikomumba.com/

Vitumbiko Mumba is a Malawian engineer and politician who became the minister of trade and industry of Malawi in 2024 under President Lazarus Chakwera.

He was Chakwera's runningmate for the 2025 Malawian general election, representing the Malawi Congress Party.

== Life ==
Mumba was educated at Phwezi Boys Secondary School. He studied in Namibia before taking an MBA at Stellenbosch Business School in South Africa.

Mumba was appointed to the cabinet as Minister of Labour in 2024. The previous minister Agnes Nyalonje had offered her resignation in July 2024 and it was not accepted by President Chakwera until December, 2024.

In March 2025, he announced moves by the government to prevent some foodstuffs from being imported. The purpose was to assist foreign exchange and local food producers of milk, peanut butter, maize and potatoes.

== Political career ==
In December 2025, Mumba was arrested by the Malawi Police Service at his residence in Lilongwe, following a warrant issued by the Lilongwe Senior Resident Magistrate Court. The arrest was linked to remarks he made during a September 2025 press briefing organised by his party after the general election, in which police alleged that his statements amounted to the publication of false information likely to cause public alarm. He was detained at Lingadzi Police Station, and the arrest sparked debate over political speech and dissent in Malawi.
