= Constitution of 1994 =

Constitution of 1994 may refer to:

- Constitution of Abkhazia
- Constitution of Argentina, reformed that year
- Constitution of Belarus
- Constitution of Belgium, reformed that year
- 1994 Constitution of Ethiopia
- Constitution of Malawi
- Constitution of Moldova (1994)
- Constitution of the Dominican Republic
- Republic of South Africa Constitution Act of 1994
