= United Transformation Movement =

Political party in Malawi

- Abbreviation: UTM
- Leader: Dalitso Kabambe
- Founder: Saulos Chilima
- Founded: 21 July 2018
- Split from: Democratic Progressive Party
- Ideology: Liberalism
- Political position: Centre to centre-right
- Colours: Red and yellow Dark red (customary)
- Slogan: Tsogolo Lathu
- National Assembly: 8 / 229

Website
- Facebook page

The United Transformation Movement (UTM) is a political party in Malawi founded by Saulos Chilima.

== History ==
On 21 July 2018, Saulos Chilima launched his transformation movement called United Transformation Movement (UTM) towards formation of his political party to contest in May 2019 elections. On 1 February 2019 Chilima's UTM held meetings with two other political parties and an alliance of smaller political parties aimed at forming a united opposition. The other parties to the discussion were the Alliance for Democracy, former Malawi President Joyce Banda's Peoples Party, and the Tikonze People's Movement led by former Vice President Cassim Chilumpha. They agreed to field one presidential candidate for the May 2019 elections. Both Joyce Banda and Cassim Chilumpha later withdrew from the alliance citing "disagreement with the selection of a presidential running mate for the candidate of the upcoming election" as their reason.

In the 2019 Malawian general election that was later nullified, Chilima alongside Dr Michael Usi as a running mate came third with 20.24% of the popular vote and United Transformation Movement won 4 seats in the National Assembly. The presidential election of 2019 was held again in 2020.

In the 2020 presidential election, Chilima contested the race as Lazarus Chakwera's running mate for the Malawi Congress Party, in the Tonse Alliance which brought up to nine opposition political parties with hopes to topple the Mutharika administration. Chilima died in a plane crash on 10 June 2024 and he was replaced by Dalitso Kabambe during an elective convention held on 17 November 2024 at Mzuzu.

Patricia Kaliati was the Secretary General of the UTM in opposition. She was said to have been a potential presidential candidate after the death of the party's leader. In October 2024, Kaliati was arrested and charged with "conspiring with others to commit a serious offence" amid rumours of a plot to assassinate President Lazarus Chakwera. Political motives for the arrest were suggested. The Malawi Human Rights Defenders Coalition (HRDC) spokesperson spoke out against her arbitrary detention.

Dr. Dalitso Kabambe was announced as the UTM's Presidential candidate. Hellen Chabunya, the UTM's Vice President for the Central Region, announced that he would take part in the three debates proposed by the Presidential Debates Task Force for August and September 2025.

== Election results ==
=== Presidential elections ===
Election	Party Candidate	Votes	%	Position	Result
2019	Saulos Chilima	1,018,369	20.24%	▲3rd	Defeated
2020	Endorsed candidacy of Lazarus Chakwera (MCP)				Elected
2025	Dalitso Kabambe	211,413	3.95%	3rd	Defeated

=== National Assembly elections ===
Election	Party leader	Votes	%	Seats	+/–	Position
2019	Saulos Chilima	491,845	9.90%	4 / 193	▲4	▲3rd
2025	Dalitso Kabambe	TBC	TBC	8 / 229	▲4	3rd
