= Ministry of Natural Resources and Climate Change (Malawi) =

Government ministry of Malawi

Ministry of Agriculture
- Tumbuka: Unduna wa vya Chilengiwa na vya Nyengo; Chichewa: Unduna wa za Chilengedwe ndi Nyengo

Ministry overview
- Jurisdiction: Government of Malawi
- Headquarters: Lilongwe, Malawi; 13°59′S 33°47′E
- Annual budget: MWK. 40 billion (2018, recurrent)
- Minister responsible: Minister of Natural Resources and Climate Change
- Child agencies: Department of Natural Resources and Climate Change; Malawi Council for Natural Resources and Climate Change

The Ministry of Natural Resources and Climate Change is a cabinet ministry in the Government of Malawi. It is responsible for the sustainable management and conservation of the country's natural resources and the development of strategies to address climate change challenges. The Ministry's headquarters are located in Lilongwe, Malawi. It oversees various departments, including the Department of Climate Change and Meteorological Services and the Environmental Affairs Department.

== History ==
The ministry was founded in the 1960s. Its responsibilities include the protection of the nation's natural resources: water, minerals, and forests. It is also responsible for the protection and restoration of the environment. Its vision is "to return the natural environment to the Malawi people and to work towards the incorporation of natural resources and the environment in the Government's national agenda as these provide the basis for social and economic development.

As of December 2024, Yusuf Mkungula serves as the Principal Secretary for the Ministry of Natural Resources and Climate Change. Michael Usi, who previously held the position of Minister of Natural Resources and Climate Change, was appointed Vice President of Malawi in June 2024.

== Departments and agencies ==
The Ministry oversees key agencies including:

- Department of Climate Change and Meteorological Services (DCCMS): Responsible for monitoring climate variability, issuing seasonal rainfall forecasts, and providing early warning systems crucial for agriculture and disaster preparedness.
- Environmental Affairs Department (EAD): Focuses on environmental protection, policy implementation, and overseeing environmental impact assessments.

=== Administration ===
- Office of the Minister
- Office of the Permanent Secretary

== See also ==
- Cabinet of Malawi
- Deforestation in Malawi
- Environmental issues in Malawi
- Government of Malawi
- List of Government Ministers of Malawi
