= Everton Chimulirenji =

Vice President of Malawi from 2019 to 2020

The Right Honourable Everton Chimulirenji
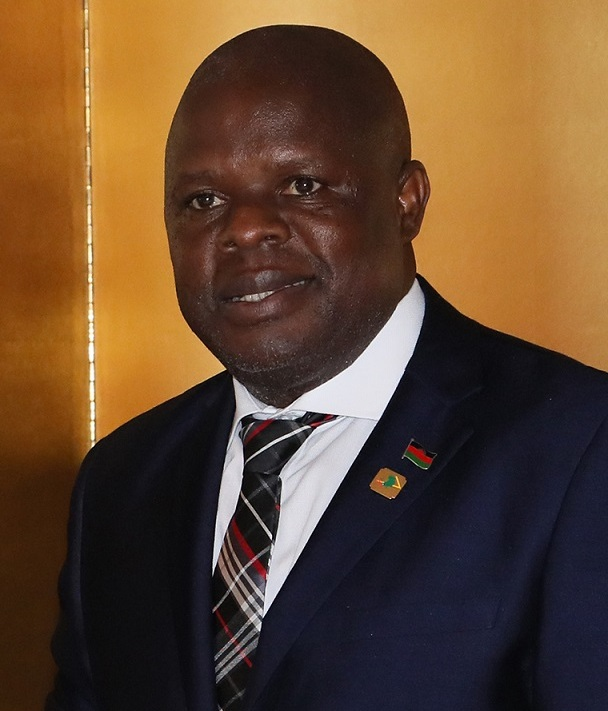
- Chimulirenji in 2019

Minister for Disaster Management
- In office 31 May 2019 – 28 June 2020
- President: Peter Mutharika
- Preceded by: Saulos Chilima

Vice President of Malawi De facto
- In office 31 May 2019 – 3 February 2020
- President: Peter Mutharika
- Preceded by: Saulos Chilima
- Succeeded by: Saulos Chilima

Personal details
- Born: c. 1963 (age 62–63)
- Party: DPP

Everton Chimulirenji (born c. 1963) is a Malawian politician. He served as the Vice President of Malawi under president Peter Mutharika after they won the 2019 elections. Chimulirenji was not well known before becoming Mutharika's running mate. Chimulirenji's tenure was short, having served May 2019 to February 2020, when his vice-presidency was voided and he was replaced by his predecessor after the 2019 general election results were nullified.

Previously he was elected to the Parliament of Malawi in 2009. Later he served as Deputy Minister of Defence and then as Minister of Civic Education, Culture and Community Development.

In 2022 he was accused by Malawi's Anti-Corruption Bureau of the unauthorised ordering of a large quantity of fertiliser while he was the minister and de facto vice-president in 2020. He had ordered Wandika Phiri who was in charge of the country's prisons to make the order. Prince Henderson who was a part owner of the fertiliser company was arrested for allegedly creating false documents.
