= Malembo, Lilongwe =

Malembo
- village
- Location in Malawi
- Coordinates: 14.22°S 34.05°E
- Country: Malawi
- Region: Northern Region
- District: Mzimba District
- Time zone: UTC+2

Malembo is a village in Malawi's Lilongwe District in the central region. It is 56 km from Lilongwe and part of the Lilongwe Chilobwe Constituency.

== Description ==
In the 2020 election, voters had queued and washed their hands with soap and water here like many during the COVID-19 pandemic. The polling station was outside the primary school, but there were few masks. This was a repeat as the previous election had been overturned by the courts. Malembo is part of the Lilongwe Chilobwe Constituency.

Malembo is in Malawi's central region. It is 56 km north-east of the capital, Lilongwe.

During the 2025 election in September 2025, the President of Malawi and his wife voted here. The polling station was again outside the primary school. Chakwera was a candidate for a second term. The election of the MP was already settled as the MCP candidate, Lawrence Chakakala Chaziya, was unopposed.

== Notable people ==
President Chakwera was born here in 1956 although his birthplace is sometimes given as Lilongwe which is the closest city.
