= Charles Chuka =

Malawian economist and banker (1953–2021)

- Born: 24 June 1953
- Died: 26 August 2021 (aged 68)
- Education: University of Malawi, University of Glasgow.
- Occupation: Reserve Bank Governor

Charles Chuka (24 June 1953 – 26 August 2021) was the governor of the Reserve Bank of Malawi from April 2012 to April 2017. When he became governor, he announced a series of reforms that allowed for foreign exchange to enter the country.

Chuka held a Bachelor of Social Science (Economics and Sociology) degree from the University of Malawi including a Master of Philosophy in monetary economics from the University of Glasgow. He worked for the Reserve Bank of Malawi from 1979 in the Economic Services division.

Chuka joined the World Bank Group from 2003 to 2009; he was a senior advisor to the executive director at the World Bank headquarters in Washington, DC. Between 2010 and 2012, he worked as the CEO of Malawi Telecommunications Ltd., Malawi's national telecommunications company.

Chuka died on 26 August 2021.He was 68.

Political offices
Preceded by Perks Ligoya	Governors of Reserve Bank of Malawi	Succeeded by Dalitso Kabambe
