= People's Party (Malawi) =

Political party in Malawi

- Abbreviation: PP
- Leader: Joyce Banda
- Secretary-General: Ibrahim Matola
- Founder: Joyce Banda
- Founded: 2011
- Split from: DPP
- Headquarters: Blantyre
- Youth wing: Orange Partners
- Ideology: Conservatism
- Political position: Centre-right
- African affiliation: Democrat Union of Africa
- Colors: Orange, Black & White
- National Assembly: 3 / 229
- SADC PF: 0 / 5
- Pan-African Parliament: 0 / 5

Election symbol
- Open lock and Key

Party flag

Website
- malawipeoplesparty.info

The People's Party is a political party in Malawi that was founded in 2011 by Joyce Banda, Vice-President of Malawi from May 2009 to April 2012, and President from 7 April 2012 to 2014.

Joyce Banda created the People's Party after being expelled from the ruling Democratic Progressive Party (DPP) when she refused to endorse President Bingu wa Mutharika's younger brother Peter Mutharika as the successor to the presidency for the 2014 general election.

== Initial problems ==
During 2011, the Registrar refused to register the organization as an official political party because its name sounded too similar to others in the country. Eventually the high court dismissed this and ordered that the party be registered within fourteen days.

== Party leaders ==
Joyce Banda: 2012–present

== Election results ==
=== Presidential elections ===
Election	Party candidate	Votes	%	Position	Result
2014	Joyce Banda	1,056,236	20.2%	▲3rd	Defeated
2019	Endorsed candidacy of Lazarus Chakwera (MCP)				Defeated
2020	Endorsed candidacy of Lazarus Chakwera (MCP)				Elected
2025	Joyce Banda	86,106	1.61	▼5th	Defeated

=== National Assembly elections ===
Election	Party leader	Votes	%	Seats	+/–	Position
2014	Joyce Banda	935,994	18.15%	26 / 193	▲26	▲2nd
2019	Joyce Banda	121,072	2.44%	5 / 193	▼21	▼4th
2025	Joyce Banda	TBA	TBA	3 / 229	▼2	▼5th
