= Saulos Chilima =

Vice President of Malawi (2014–2019, 2020–2024)

The Right Honourable Saulos Chilima
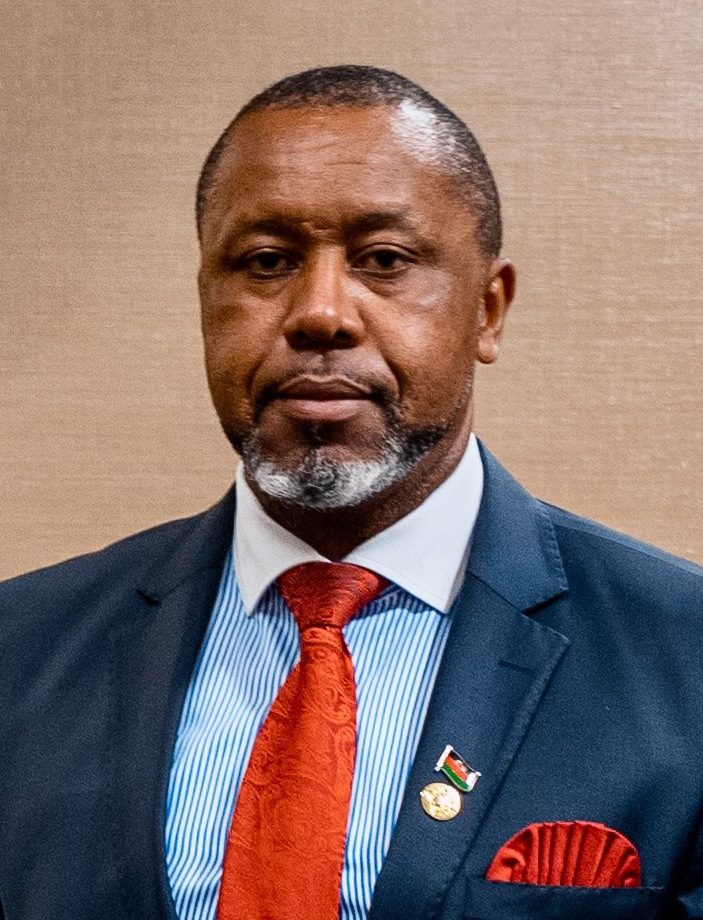
- Chilima in 2022

7th Vice President of Malawi
- In office 3 February 2020 – 10 June 2024
- President: Peter Mutharika; Lazarus Chakwera
- Preceded by: Everton Chimulirenji
- Succeeded by: Michael Usi
- In office 31 May 2014 – 31 May 2019
- President: Peter Mutharika
- Preceded by: Khumbo Kachali
- Succeeded by: Everton Chimulirenji

Minister of Economic Planning and Development
- In office 29 June 2020 – 10 June 2024
- President: Lazarus Chakwera
- Preceded by: Position created
- Succeeded by: Vacant

Minister of the Civil Service
- In office 31 May 2014 – 31 May 2019
- President: Peter Mutharika
- Preceded by: Khumbo Kachali

Minister Responsible for Public Events and Disaster Management
- In office 31 May 2014 – 31 May 2019
- President: Peter Mutharika
- Preceded by: Khumbo Kachali

Personal details
- Born: Saulos Klaus Chilima; 12 February 1973 Ntcheu, Malawi
- Died: 10 June 2024 (aged 51) Chikangawa Forest Reserve, Malawi
- Cause of death: Plane crash
- Party: Tonse Alliance; United Transformation Movement (UTM)
- Other political affiliations: Democratic Progressive Party (until 2018)
- Spouse: Mary Chilima
- Children: 2 (Sean and Elizabeth)
- Education: University of Malawi; University of Bolton

Saulos Klaus Chilima (12 February 1973 – 10 June 2024) was a Malawian economist and politician who served as Vice President of Malawi from 2014 to 2019 and again from 2020 until his death in 2024. Chilima assumed office on 28 June 2020, winning the majority alongside presidential candidate Lazarus Chakwera. Chilima also served as the Minister of Economic Planning and Development, as well as Head of Public Sector Reforms, a position he also previously held under the administration of former president Peter Mutharika. Before joining politics, Chilima held key leadership positions in various multi-national companies including Unilever, Coca-Cola, and Airtel Malawi, where he rose to become Chief Executive Officer.

On 10 June 2024, a plane carrying Chilima and eight other passengers crashed in Chikangawa Forest Reserve in Mzimba District, killing all onboard. At least 41,000 people attended his state funeral.

== Early life and education ==
Born on 12 February 1973 in Ntcheu, Malawi. He was the first child of Henderson Brown Chilima of Ching'anga Village, T/A Njewa, Lilongwe and Elizabeth Frances Valeira Chilima of Mbilintengerenji Village, T/A Champiti, Ntcheu. Chilima spent most of his early life in Blantyre where his parents were working and spent his summer holidays with his paternal and maternal grandparents in Lilongwe and Ntcheu, respectively.

Chilima did his primary school at HHI and Dharap primary schools, and his secondary education at the Marist Brothers Mtendere Secondary School Thiwi in the Dedza District. He went on to the University of Malawi, Chancellor College, where he graduated with a degree in social sciences in 1994. After working for a few years, he returned to his alma mater (University of Malawi) to pursue a master of arts in Economics, graduating in 2005. On 10 August 2015, Chilima received his Ph.D in Knowledge Management from the University of Bolton in the United Kingdom.

== Business career ==
A marketer by profession, Chilima started his work career at Lever Brothers (Mw) Limited (now part of Unilever) before moving on to the Leasing and Finance Company of Malawi, and later Southern Bottlers Limited (now Castel Malawi). His last professional assignment was at Airtel Malawi where he was hired to lead its sales team before being named the first-ever local managing director for the company in 2010.

Chilima's most notable professional career successes include spearheading the strategic and breakthrough projects at Airtel, namely Project Precision, Yabooka, Airtel Money, and a 3G network upgrade, which resulted in significant impacts on the business revenue and employee engagement, growing Airtel Malawi's annual revenue by 75% over a period of three years from US$54 million in 2010 to US$95 million in 2013.

== Political career ==
In February 2014, Chilima was the running mate of Democratic Progressive Party (DPP) presidential candidate Peter Mutharika for the May 2014 presidential election.

Chilima later left the DPP and launched his own party, the United Transformation Movement (UTM), on 21 July 2018 to contest the May 2019 elections. On 1 February 2019, the UTM held meetings with two other political parties and an alliance of smaller political parties aimed at forming a united opposition. These included the Alliance for Democracy (Aford), former President Joyce Banda's People's Party, and the Tikonze People's Movement led by former Vice-President Cassim Chilumpha. They agreed to field one presidential candidate for the election. Both Banda and Chilumpha later withdrew from the alliance citing "disagreement with the selection of a presidential running mate for the candidate of the upcoming election" as their reason.

In the election, Chilima alongside Michael Usi as a running mate came third with 20.24% of the popular vote and the UTM won four seats in the National Assembly. However, the presidential election was annulled and rerun in 2020. In that year, Chilima contested the race as Lazarus Chakwera's running mate for the Malawi Congress Party, in the Tonse alliance which brought up to nine opposition political parties with hopes to topple the administration of Peter Mutharika.

On 22 June 2022, Chilima was stripped of his delegated powers as a vice president due to his involvement in a US$150 million corruption scandal involving alleged influence in the awarding of government contracts.

In November 2022, he was charged on allegations that he received US$280,000 from a British businessman Zuneth Sattar in exchange for awarding government contracts to Xaviar Ltd and Malachitte FZE, two companies linked to Sattar. He pleaded not guilty to the corruption charges. In May 2024 the corruption charges were dropped after the state prosecutor filed a motion to dismiss the case. President Chakwera had started to assign official duties to Chilima even before the charges were dropped.

== Advocacies ==
Previously, Chilima also served as minister for disaster relief and public events.

Chilima was a member of the Leadership Council of Compact 2025, a partnership that develops and disseminates evidence-based advice to politicians and other decision-makers aimed at ending hunger and undernutrition by 2025, and wrote on the topic of malnutrition. He spoke on sustainable and inclusive development and at international conferences on ending hunger.

Chilima voiced his advocacy of environmentalism and of physical fitness and sports participation, a stern critic of corruption in politics, and an active supporter of Archdiocesan seminaries. As a student, he led the students' wing of Alliance for Democracy (Aford), founded by Chakufwa Chihana for championing multi-party democracy.

== Personal life ==
Chilima was married to Mary Chilima. They had at two children, Sean and Elizabeth. He was a Catholic.

== Death ==
On 10 June 2024, a Dornier 228 aircraft of the Malawi Defence Force carrying Chilima and eight others went missing in the Chikangawa Forest Reserve in the Northern Region while they were on their way to attend the funeral of former government minister Ralph Kasambara. President Lazarus Chakwera ordered a search and rescue operation after aviation officials were unable to contact the aircraft. On 11 June 2024, in a national address, Chakwera stated that Chilima and all the other passengers on the plane (including a former First Lady of Malawi, Patricia Shanil Muluzi) were confirmed dead in the crash.

After Chilima's body was recovered, a state funeral service was held for him at the Bingu National Stadium in Lilongwe on 16 June, during which at least 41,000 people attended. He was buried on 17 June in his home village of Nsipe, in a ceremony that was also attended by Chakwera and former presidents Bakili Muluzi, Joyce Banda and Peter Mutharika. The memorial service for Chilima was held by his family at his grave site at Nsipe in Ntcheu a year after his death, with another memorial service being held the same day led by President Lazarus Chakwera at Nthungwa, the crash site.

In October 2024, President Lazarus Chakwera established a Commission of Inquiry into the 10 June 2024 aircraft accident that killed Chilima and eight others. The commission was mandated under the Commissions of Inquiry Act and given power to summon witnesses, obtain records, and make recommendations. Its formation followed public calls, including from Chilima’s widow and civil society groups, for an independent probe into the crash.

In February 2026, following public dissatisfaction with the commission's findings and a change in government, President Mutharika ordered a fresh inquiry into the crash, to be conducted by a parliamentary committee supported by a team of experts. This followed calls from various groups, including some of Chilima's supporters, and an earlier review of the commission's report by Justice Minister Charles Mhango.

== See also ==
- Commission of Inquiry into the 2024 Chikangawa (Nthungwa) aircraft accident
- List of solved missing person cases (2020s)
