= Dalitso Kabambe =

Malawi central banker (born 17 November 1973)

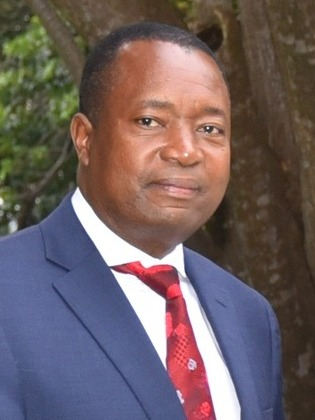
- Kabambe in 2025

13th Governor of the Reserve Bank of Malawi
- In office 21 April 2017 – 8 July 2020
- Appointed by: Peter Mutharika
- Preceded by: Charles Chuka
- Succeeded by: Wilson Banda

Personal details
- Born: 17 November 1973 (age 52) Thyolo, Thyolo District, Malawi
- Spouse: Brigitte Kabambe
- Education: Imperial College London, University of Malawi

Dalitso Kabambe (born 17 November 1973) is an economist, banker and politician from Malawi. He served as the 13th Governor of the Reserve Bank of Malawi from 2017 until 2020. On 17 November 2024, he was elected President of the United Transformation Movement. On 16 September 2025 he led the UTM in the Malawi Election where they came third. He lost his own seat.

== Life ==
Kabambe was born in 1973 in Thyolo. He got his first degree in Agricultural Economics from the University of Malawi in 1998. He studied for a PhD and a master's degree in Development Economics from Imperial College, University of London, which he obtained in 2008 and 2001 respectively.

== Career ==
Prior to his governorship of the country's central bank, Kabambe worked in the Malawi Government Economic Service for a period of 19 years from 1998. He held different positions such as Principal Economist, Chief Economist, Deputy Director of Economic Planning and, Budget Director in the Ministry of Finance, Economic Planning and Development. He was the Director of Planning and Policy Development at the Ministry of Health from 2013 to 2015, where he was also in charge of the national health budget. He served as Secretary of Foreign Affairs and International Cooperation for close to two years.

Kabambe was appointed Governor for the Reserve Bank of Malawi on 21 April 2017 by the Malawi President Peter Mutharika.

He was replaced as governor by Wilson Banda on 9 July 2020. Kabambe joined politics on 31 December 2020 when he was announced as a member of the opposition Democratic Progressive Party (Malawi). Media reports indicated that Kabambe would run to be leader of the party and as a candidate in the 2025 Malawian presidential elections.

In 2024 he joined the United Transformation Movement (UTM) following the death of the former UTM president and Vice president of Malawi in a plane crash that claimed eight lives, Dr Saulos Klaus Chilima. On 17 November 2024, he was elected president of UTM. He lost his seat in the 2025 Malawian elections.

== Controversies ==
It emerged that as governor of Malawi's central bank, his monthly wage was K24 million (about US$30,000). In an interview with Zodiak, Kabambe confirmed the reports, saying his salary was approved by the Bank's board and allowed by the Reserve Bank of Malawi Act of Parliament.

One of the country's civil society organisations (CSOs) described as politically motivated the forensic audit that leaked Kabambe's salary. The Centre for Democracy and Economic Development (CDEDI), claimed in a report that it released to the media that the audit was illegal and that the leakage smacked of a conspiracy to stop Kabambe from becoming DPP's torchbearer in order to oust the incumbent president, Lazarus Chakwera in the 2025 Malawi presidential elections. The organisation called the audit illegal.

In May, 2021, the Lilongwe Water Board released names of owners of residences with illegal water connections in local newspapers in an unprecedented "name and shame" campaign. Dr. Kabambe's name appeared on the list. It was alleged that he authorized an illegal water connection to his house, concerns that cast a shadow on his longshot bid for the presidency in 2025.

In December 2021, Kabambe was accused of manipulating accounts to obtain a loan from the International Monetary Fund while he was director of the Central bank of Malawi.

== Personal life ==
Kabambe married to Brigitte Kabambe. The couple had three children. He is a member of the Seventh-day Adventist Church where he is also a Church Elder.

Political offices
Preceded by Charles Chuka	Governors of Reserve Bank of Malawi	Succeeded by Wilson Banda
