= Kondwani Nankhumwa =

Malawian politician

Kondwani Nankhumwa (born July 3, 1978) is a Malawian politician who served as the Minister of Local Government in the Democratic Progressive Party (DPP) government led by President Peter Mutharika. In July 2018, he was elected the vice president of the DPP for the southern region of Malawi, assuming this position after the dismissal of George Chaponda for his alleged involvement in a corruption scandal known as "Maize-gate"..

== Career ==
In June 2020, following the defeat of the DPP in the 2020 Malawian presidential election, Nankhumwa became Leader of the Opposition in the National Assembly. In January 2024, he was expelled from the DPP, and the party chose Mary Navicha as Leader of the Opposition in his place, but a court injunction prevented the party from removing him from his position. He then founded the People's Development Party, before vacating the court injunction in June 2024, at which point he was replaced as Leader of the Opposition by George Chaponda.

In October 2025, he announced his intention to contest for the position of Speaker of the National Assembly of Malawi, citing his parliamentary experience and leadership roles. However, on the day of the election, he was disqualified from the contest after becoming the fifth nominee, as the parliamentary standing orders only allowed a maximum of four candidates to contest for the Speaker position.

== Private life ==
His wife, Getrude Nankhumwa, is also an MP.
