= 2019 Malawian general election =

- 21 May 2019
- Presidential election
- Registered: 6,859,570
- Turnout: 74.44% (▲3.69 pp)
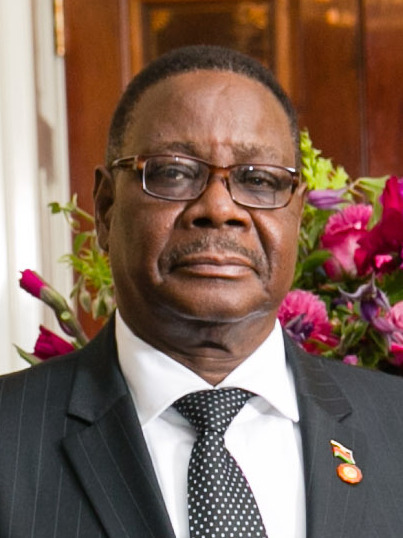

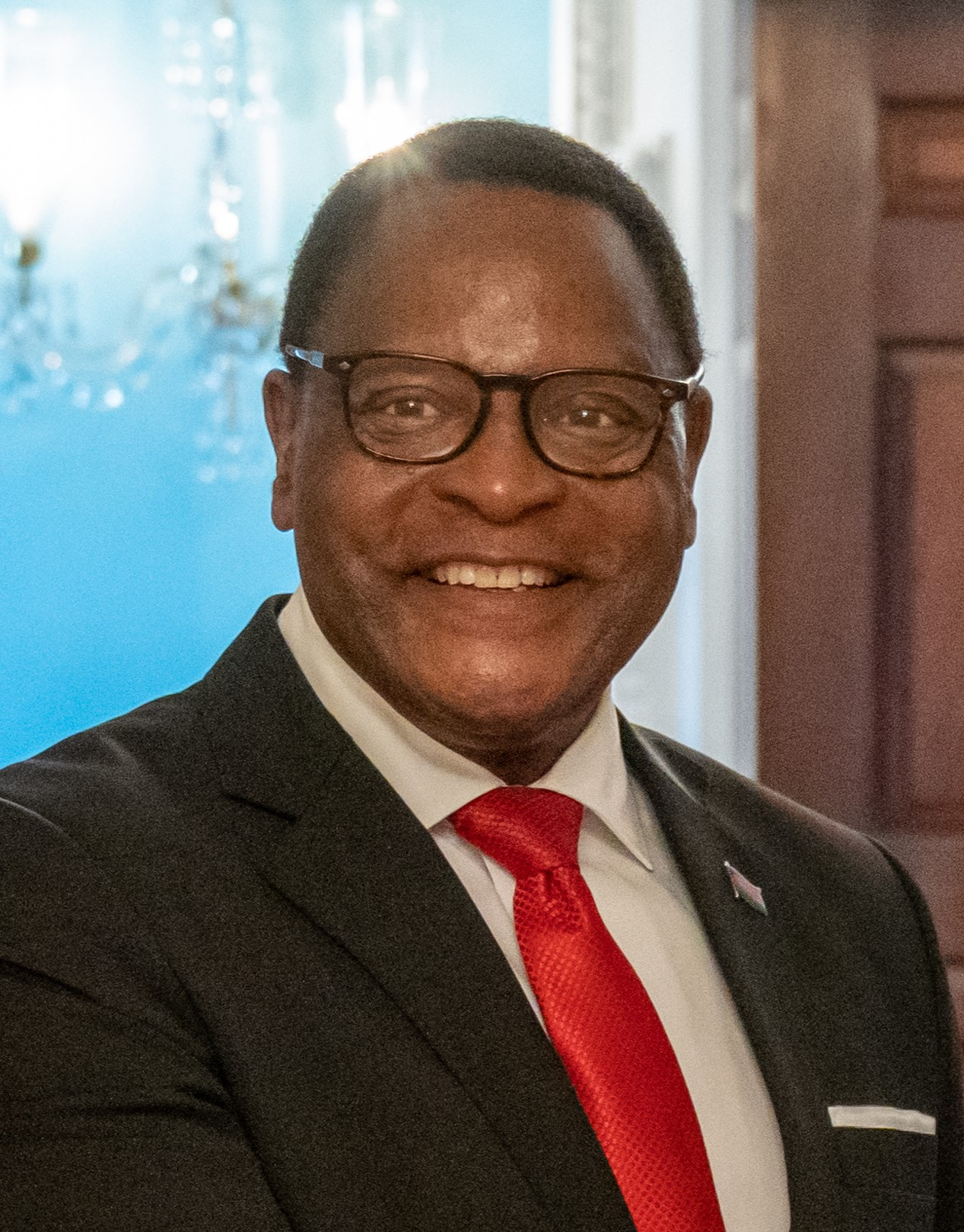

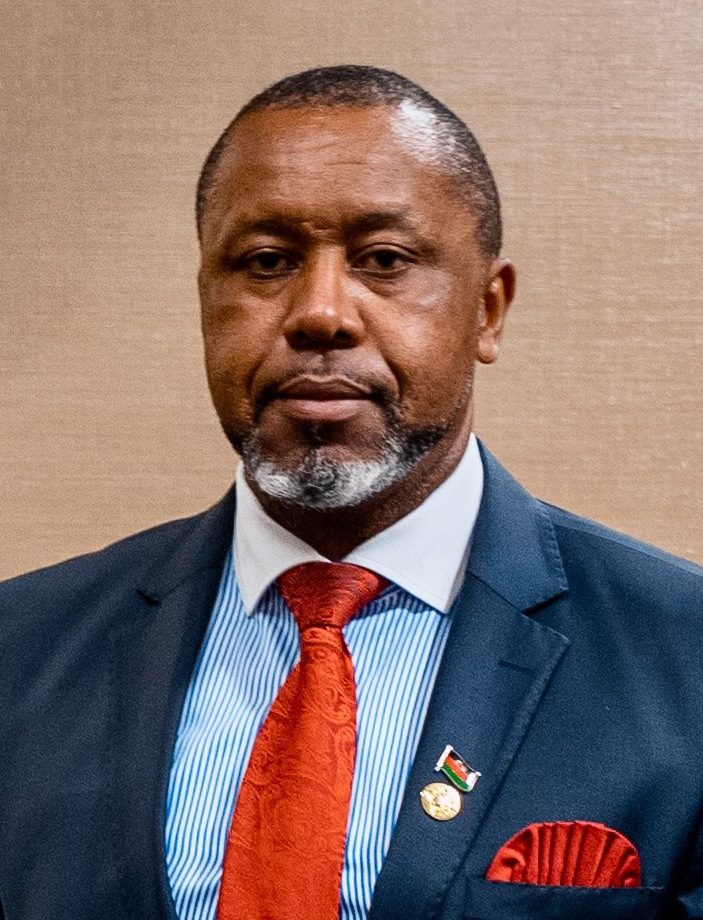
Nominee	Peter Mutharika	Lazarus Chakwera	Saulos Chilima
Party	DPP	MCP	UTM
Running mate	Everton Chimulirenji	Sidik Mia	Michael Usi
Popular vote	1,940,709	1,781,740	1,018,369
Percentage	38.57%	35.41%	20.24%
- Results by region (left) and district (right)
President before election
Peter Mutharika
DPP
Elected President
Election results annulled
Peter Mutharika remains president
- Legislative election
- All 193 seats in the National Assembly; 97 seats needed for a majority
- Turnout: 73.93% (▲3.18 pp)
Party	Leader	Vote %	Seats	+/–
DPP	Peter Mutharika	26.04	62	+11
MCP	Lazarus Chakwera	22.32	55	+7
UTM	Saulos Chilima	9.90	4	New
UDF	Atupele Muluzi	4.58	10	−4
PP	Joyce Banda	2.44	5	−21
AFORD	Enoch Chihana	0.49	1	0
Independents	–	33.43	55	+3
This lists parties that won seats. See the complete results below.
Results by constituency

General elections were held in Malawi on 21 May 2019 to elect the President, National Assembly and local government councillors. Incumbent President Peter Mutharika of the Democratic Progressive Party was re-elected, with his party remaining the largest in the National Assembly.

On 3 February 2020, the Constitutional Court annulled the presidential election results due to evidence of irregularities, and ordered fresh elections be held. They were widely dubbed the "Tipp-Ex elections" after a brand of correction fluid which opponents claimed had been used to tamper with votes. According to a 2025 study, the irregularities appear consistent with human error, as opposed to intentional fraud.

== Electoral system ==
The President of Malawi is elected using the first-past-the-post system; the candidate that receives the most votes is the winner of the election. The 193 members of the National Assembly are also elected by first-past-the-post voting in single-member constituencies.

== Presidential candidates ==
A total of ten candidates registered to contest the elections. Incumbent President Peter Mutharika of the Democratic Progressive Party (DPP) ran for a second term in office. Vice-President Saulos Chilima also contested the election as the United Transformation Movement (UTM) candidate, having left the DPP in 2018. The other candidates included Lazarus Chakwera (Malawi Congress Party) and Atupele Muluzi (United Democratic Front).

Former president Joyce Banda (People's Party) had originally planned to run for the presidency, but withdrew her candidacy two months before the election; she later endorsed opposition candidate Lazarus Chakwera. Ras Chikomeni Chirwa was disqualified due to lack of funds and failing to collect enough signatures.

TV debates took place in the lead-up to the elections.

== Results ==
=== President ===
Candidate	Running mate	Party	Votes	%
Peter Mutharika	Everton Chimulirenji	Democratic Progressive Party	1,940,709	38.57
Lazarus Chakwera	Sidik Mia	Malawi Congress Party	1,781,740	35.41
Saulos Chilima	Michael Usi	United Transformation Movement	1,018,369	20.24
Atupele Muluzi	Frank Tumpale Mwenifumbo	United Democratic Front	235,164	4.67
Peter Kuwani	Archibald Kalawang'oma	Mbakuwaku Movement for Development	20,369	0.40
John Eugenes Chisi	Timothy Watch Kamulete	Umodzi Party	19,187	0.38
Hadwick Kaliya	Mabvuto Alfred Ng'ona	Independent	15,726	0.31
Total			5,031,264	100.00
Valid votes			5,031,264	98.54
Invalid/blank votes			74,719	1.46
Total votes			5,105,983	100.00
Registered voters/turnout			6,859,570	74.44
Source: Malawi Electoral Commission

=== National Assembly ===
Party	Votes	%	Seats	+/–
Democratic Progressive Party	1,293,797	26.04	62	+11
Malawi Congress Party	1,108,735	22.32	55	+7
United Transformation Movement	491,845	9.90	4	New
United Democratic Front	227,335	4.58	10	–4
People's Party	121,072	2.44	5	–21
Alliance for Democracy	24,212	0.49	1	0
Freedom Party	15,777	0.32	0	New
Democratic People's Congress	10,604	0.21	0	New
People's Transformation Party	5,320	0.11	0	0
Tikonze People's Movement	5,076	0.10	0	New
Umodzi Party	2,386	0.05	0	0
National Salvation Front	553	0.01	0	0
Mbakuwaku Movement for Development	493	0.01	0	New
Independents	1,660,569	33.43	55	+3
Vacant			1	–
Total	4,967,774	100.00	193	0
Valid votes	4,967,774	97.97		
Invalid/blank votes	103,174	2.03		
Total votes	5,070,948	100.00		
Registered voters/turnout	6,859,570	73.93		

== Aftermath ==
The results of the 2019 elections were highly controversial and opposition leaders led by Lazarus Chakwera and Saulos Chilima disputed the results in court. Nationwide protests were held in May, June, and July 2019 in which supporters of the opposition accused the results of being rigged by Mutharika and Jane Ansah, chairperson of the Malawi Electoral Commission, calling for Ansah’s resignation. Malawian youth organised a "Jane Ansah Must Fall" campaign, which included days of protests in several cities. In response, thousands of women in Malawi held "I am Jane Ansah" solidarity protests after alleging that Ansah was the victim of gender discrimination.

On 3 February 2020, the Constitutional Court judges arrived in Lilongwe to read the disputed presidential election results judgement after travelling in a military vehicle with a heavy police escort. The judges took turns to read the 500-page decision over more than seven hours. The ruling nullified the results of the presidential election, concluding they had not met the standards of a free and fair election and that the Malawi Electoral Commission had failed to uphold its constitutional responsibilities. The judgement cited tampering of results, failure to address complaints raised by opposition candidates, and numerous other malpractices. The ruling also called into question the use of a plurality system in the presidential elections, stating the Malawi Constitution requires a majority of votes.

Mutharika was declared not duly elected and thus no longer President. The judges ordered fresh elections be held within 150 days.

Although DPP won a plurality of seats, elections in three of the seats it won were annulled due to irregularities, and thus they were reduced to 59 lawmakers in the Parliament.
