= Michael Usi =

Vice President of the Republic of Malawi from 2024 to 2025

The Right Honourable Michael Usi
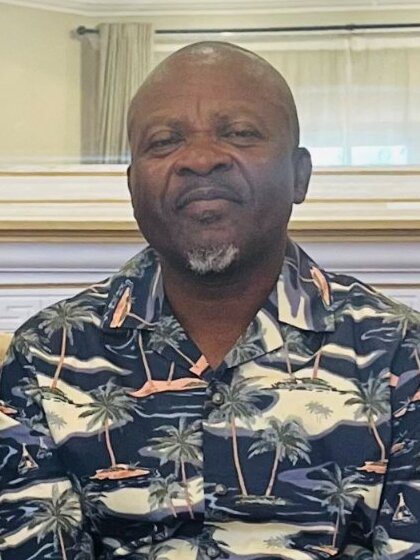
- Usi in 2025

8th Vice-President of Malawi
- In office 20 June 2024 – 4 October 2025
- President: Lazarus Chakwera
- Preceded by: Saulos Chilima
- Succeeded by: Jane Ansah

Personal details
- Born: Michael Bizwick Usi; 16 December 1968 (age 57) Malawi
- Education: University of Bedfordshire
- Occupations: Actor; Musician; Playwright; Politician
- Spouse: Ella Usi
- Children: 2
- Awards: Outstanding Service to youth ministries using theatre – 2008 West Central Africa Division, Nigeria

Michael Bizwick Usi (born 16 December 1968) is a Malawian actor, musician, playwright and politician. He was the vice-President of Malawi following the death of Saulos Chilima, he was subsequently succeeded by Dr Jane Ansah following the Polls on 16 September 2025 after having served as the Minister of Tourism, Culture & Wildlife until 30 January 2023; and as the Minister of Natural Resources and Climate Change. As an actor, he is most famously known for his role as "Dr. Manga" in the film Dr. Manga. He is also the director of the MBC TV series Tikuferanji (Why Are We Dying).

== Career ==
In the absence of national TV in Malawi, he gained his popularity by acting on radio plays on MBC Radio 1 in Malawi. He then began making feature films. His works comment on topical issues in Malawi and reflect the social and political realities of Malawian life.

Usi is involved in trying to build the film industry in Malawi and constantly advocates for the growth of the industry in Malawi. In 2010 he made an appearance at the MWA (Malawi Washington Association) Extravaganza 2010 Panel discussion hosted by the MWA at the Malawian Embassy in Washington DC where he discussed the history of the Malawian Film industry and his ideas on its expansion.

The focus of his PhD, which he gained from the University of Bedfordshire in 2017, is on youth engagement in developing their country. His research involved review of youth engagement strategies in many countries.

On 6 February 2019, United Transformation Movement (UTM) leader Saulos Klaus Chilima unveiled Michael Usi as his running mate for May 21 tripartite elections.

On 8 July 2020, Michael Usi was appointed Minister of Tourism, Wildlife and Culture of the Republic of Malawi in the cabinet of President Lazarus Chakwera.

On 31 January 2023, he was appointed Minister of Natural Resources and Climate Change.

On 20 June 2024, Usi was appointed as vice president of Malawi following the death of his predecessor Saulos Chilima in a plane crash.

== Personal life ==
Usi was born on 16 December 1968. He attended Mulanje Secondary School. He once worked for Adventist Development and Relief Agency (ADRA). He is married to Ella, a retired nurse that used to work at the Blantyre Adventist Hospital.

== Works ==
=== Films ===
- Dr Manga – Comedy about a Malawian Houseboy, Dr. Manganya.
- Manganya in Action
- Living on Perfume (2009) – Filmed on location in Malawi and Burundi, the film details the conditions in Malawian prisons and the Malawian penal system. It also comments on politics and love throughout its four episodes. It features an international cast of Australian, British, Malawian and Swedish actors. Local artists featured are Ruth Simika, Augustine Mauwa, Deus Sandramu, and Gift Namachekecha.
- International Cook
- Watch Out (2010) – Filmed in location in the Washington DC metro area, this film is the story of the experiences of a man trying to settle in the US with a Visitor's Visa. Featuring Clare Johnson (American), Brendon Mitchell (American), and Albert Kazako (Malawian).

=== TV series ===
- Tikuferanji (Why Are We Dying) – A series that enlightens Malawian about HIV/Aids and encouraging healthy love and sex lives.

== Awards ==
- Outstanding Service to youth ministries using theatre – 2008 West Central Africa Division, Nigeria

== Work History Timeline ==
- Dr. Manga (Film)
- Mangayana in Action (film)
- International Cook (film)
- Tikuferanji (Why Are We Dying) (TV series)
- Living on Perfume (film) - 2009
- Watch Out (film)- 2010
