= Lazarus Chakwera =

President of Malawi from 2020 to 2025

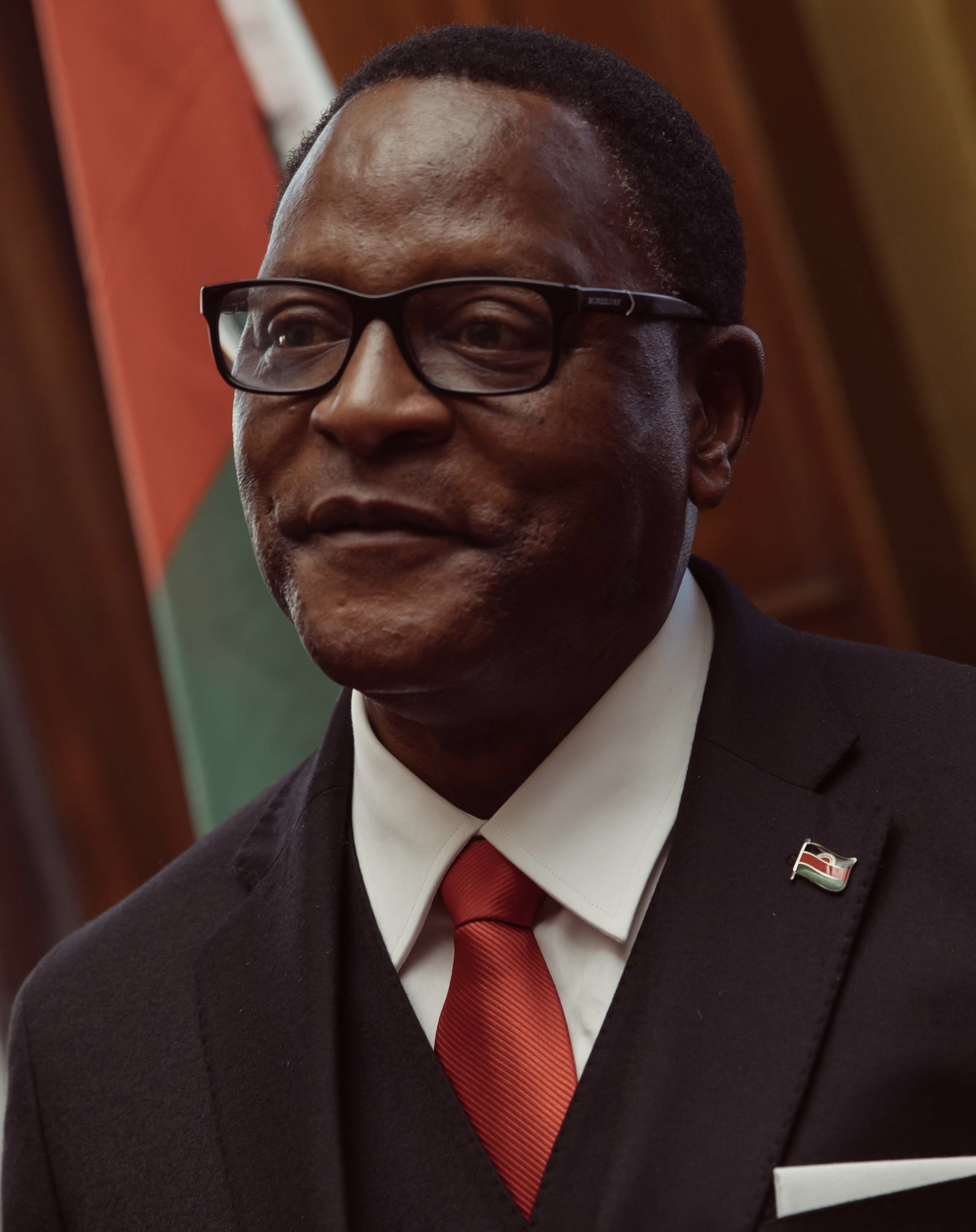
- Chakwera in 2021

6th President of Malawi
- In office 28 June 2020 – 4 October 2025
- Vice President: Saulos Chilima (2020–2024); Michael Usi (2024–2025)
- Preceded by: Peter Mutharika
- Succeeded by: Peter Mutharika

President of the Malawi Congress Party
- Incumbent
- Assumed office 11 August 2013
- Preceded by: John Tembo

Minister of Defense
- In office 28 June 2020 – 31 January 2023
- President: Himself
- Preceded by: Peter Mutharika
- Succeeded by: Harry Mkandawire

Member of the National Assembly for Lilongwe North West
- In office 20 May 2014 – 23 June 2020
- Preceded by: Ishmail Fillimon Chafukira
- Succeeded by: Boti Phiri

Personal details
- Born: Lazarus McCarthy Chakwera; 5 April 1955 (age 71) Lilongwe, Federation of Rhodesia and Nyasaland (now Malawi)
- Party: Malawi Congress Party
- Spouse: Monica Gondwé (m. 1977)
- Children: 4
- Education: University of Malawi; University of the North; University of South Africa; Trinity International University

Lazarus McCarthy Chakwera (born 5 April 1955) is a Malawian politician, theologian, and pastor who served as the sixth president of Malawi from 2020 to 2025. A member of the Malawi Congress Party (MCP), he has served as the party's president since 2013. He also served as President of the Malawian Assemblies of God from 1989 to 2013, and during his presidency concurrently served as Minister of Defense from 2020 to 2023.

Born in Lilongwe, Chakwera graduated from the University of Malawi in 1977 with a bachelor's degree in arts and philosophy. He then joined the Malawian Assemblies of God's School of Theology in 1983 where he became its president in 1996 and served in this role until 2000. During this time, Chakwera became the president of the Malawian Assemblies of God in 1989 and served in this role until his resignation 2013, when he entered politics and joined the Malawi Congress Party and was elected as the party's leader in August of that year. In the presidential election held the following year, Chakwera ran for the presidency, but while getting more votes than incumbent Joyce Banda, he lost to the Democratic Progressive Party (DPP)'s presidential candidate Peter Mutharika. In the 2019 presidential election, Chakwera lost again to Mutharika. However, in February 2020, the Constitutional Court annulled the election results citing irregularities and a rerun election was held, where Chakwera won.

During his presidency, Chakwera implemented governance and education reforms, improved international engagement, and made efforts to increase transparency. He built more schools, especially in rural areas and also improved some infrastructure in the country. However, Chakwera's presidency was overshadowed by economic challenges such as high inflation, rising cost of living, currency devaluation, and growing public debt. Despite his anti-corruption stance, Chakwera also faced criticism over corruption and nepotism, which he promises to fight when coming to office. Chakwera appointed relatives to his cabinet and also appointed people related to some members of his cabinet. Several protests also occurred during Chakwera's presidency, in July and October 2022 and 2024, all of which were against Chakwera and his government's slow handling of corruption cases and as well as the cost of living. In some of these peaceful demonstrations, protesters were attacked by masked, machete-wielding men, an incident condemned by rights groups and foreign missions. As a result of the economic crisis and the slow handling of corruption cases and as well as nepotism, Chakwera lost the 2025 presidential election to Mutharika.

== Personal life ==
Lazarus Chakwera was born in Malembo, Lilongwe, near the capital city of Malawi, on 5 April 1955 while the country was still under British colonial rule. His father was a primary school teacher and supplemented his family's income through subsistence farming.

Lazarus married Monica Chakwera on 8 October 1977, and they have four children (one son and three daughters).

== Education ==
Chakwera graduated with a Bachelor of Arts (Philosophy) Degree from the University of Malawi in 1977. He studied theology and gained an Honours degree from the University of the North in South Africa and gained a master's degree (MTh) from the University of South Africa in 1991. Trinity International University in the United States awarded him a doctorate (D.Min) in 2000. He became a professor at the Pan-Africa Theological Seminary in 2005.

== Theological career ==
Chakwera worked as an instructor at the Assemblies of God's School of Theology from 1983 to 2000, where he became the principal in 1996. He has been the co-director and a lecturer at All Nations Theological Seminary. From 1989 to 2013 he presided over the Malawi Assemblies of God. On 14 April 2013, he took many by surprise when he declared his intentions to run at a convention of the opposition Malawi Congress Party (MCP) as president while still maintaining the Assemblies of God Presidency.

== Political career ==
Rumours of Chakwera's intention to run in the MCP's presidential race were first reported in online media on 9 April 2013. They were confirmed on 14 April 2013. Chakwera later submitted his nomination papers while still at the helm of the Malawi Assemblies of God. The MCP convention slated for 27 April 2013 was later postponed to 10 and 11 August where he was elected as the president of MCP and he represented the party in the 2014 general elections. During 2014 Malawi General elections, rumors speculated in different platforms that the elections were rigged. Chakwera told all Malawians to remain peaceful, accept the outcome, and wait for the next coming elections. Besides being successful as the main opposition party president, he also served as a member of parliament for the Lilongwe North West Constituency.

Chakwera announced his resignation as the head of the Malawian Assemblies of God, effective 14 May 2013. He said this would enable him to concentrate more on front-line politics, taking the view that he was still serving God in another context. Chakwera joined forces with UTM leader Saulos Chilima and multiple other parties to form the Tonse Alliance in preparation for the June 2020 Malawi general elections, with Chilima running as vice president. This happened when court ruled out the 2019 General elections due to massive irregularities after DPP claimed victory.

Chakwera defeated incumbent president Peter Mutharika in the 2020 election, having obtained almost 59% of the vote. Chakwera was sworn in as the sixth president of Malawi on 28 June. On this occasion, Malawi became the first African country to have its presidential election result overturned due to irregularities and an opposition leader go on to win the rerun election. The Republic of Kenya's Supreme Court had been the first to nullify in 2017, but the rerun election therefrom was never won by the opposition leader.

== Presidency (2020–2025) ==
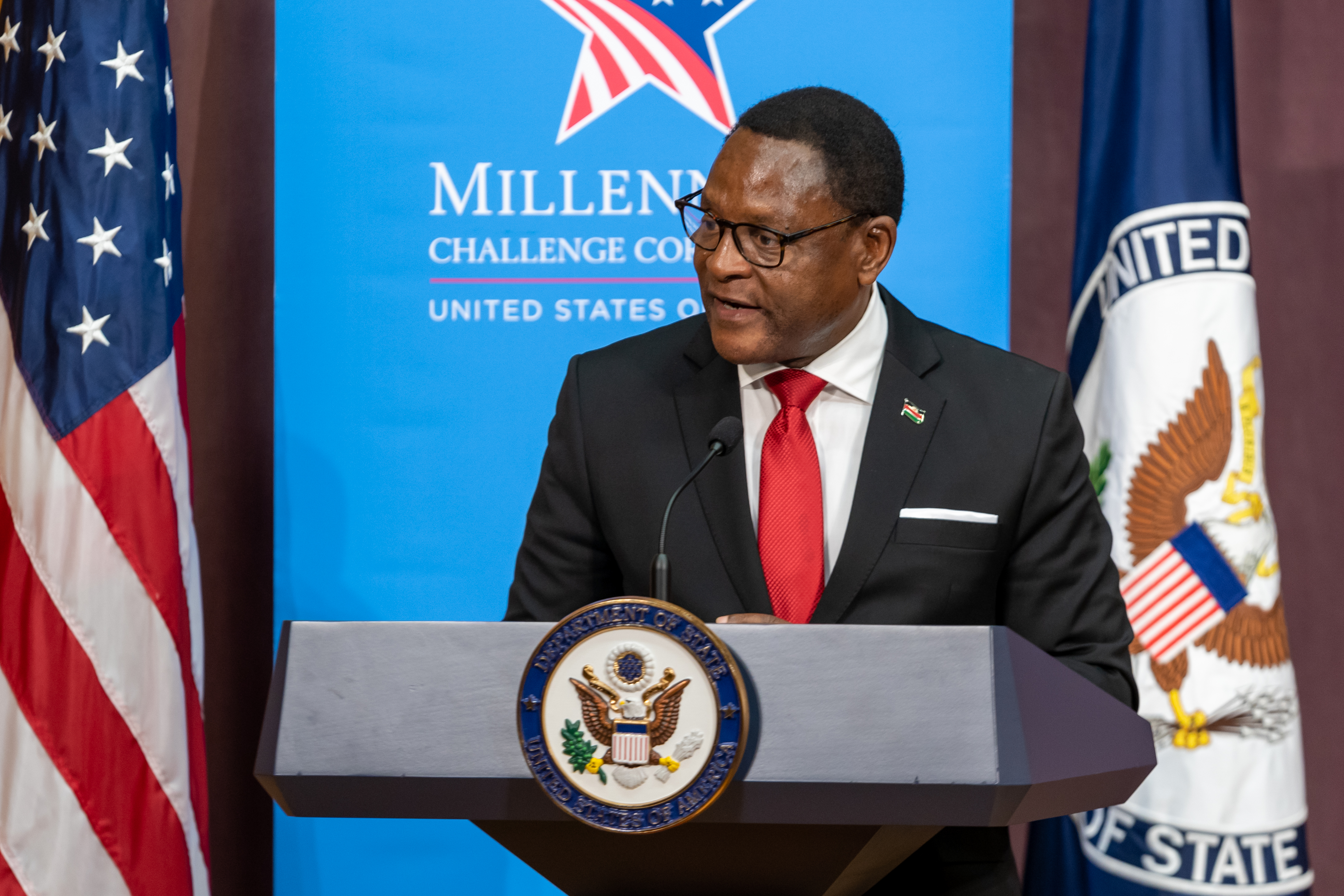
Chakwera speaks in 2022

=== Cabinet appointments ===
Soon after Chakwera's election as president, he became subject to criticism over appointing mutually related family members to cabinet. Chakwera's 31 member cabinet announced after inauguration had six members who were relatives with another member of the cabinet. Sidik Mia, Chakwera's running mate in 2019, was appointed minister of transport and public works and his wife Abida Mia the deputy-Minister for Lands. Kenny Kandodo and his sister Khumbize Kandodo both occupied ministerial posts, the former being the minister for labour while the latter being the minister for health. Similarly, Gospel Kazako became Minister of Information while his sister-in-law Agnes Nkusa Nkhoma became the deputy-Minister for Agriculture. More than 70% of the cabinet ministers were from the central region of Malawi, Chakwera's traditional stronghold. Chakwera defended his decisions, saying that he would address concerns related to the appointments.

Activists and organisations working on gender equality organised public demonstrations in October 2020 protesting against gender imbalance in public service appointments that Chakwera had made. The activists accused President Chakwera of disregarding the Malawi Gender Equality Act that demands that women should make at least 40 per cent of all public appointments. The activists sued the President over the gender imbalance in his appointments. The issue is still in court.

=== Trimming executive powers ===
Chakwera stated that he was working to reduce executive powers to enhance presidential accountability to the people and strengthen the authority of other branches of government.

=== Chairperson of SADC ===
Lazarus Chakwera was elected by member states of SADC as the chairperson of the group. He was the chairman of the SADC which he assumed from his predecessor, Mozambican President Filipe Nyusi in August 2021.

=== Daughter's appointments ===
Chakwera has faced criticism for appointing his daughter and vice president Saulos Chilima's mother-in-law to diplomatic positions. The president appointed his daughter Violet Chakwera as a diplomatic secretary to Brussels and for the EU. However, the president vehemently rebutted these reports as baseless and stated so on a BBC interview during his visit to the UK in 2021. Published media reports indicate that his daughter is not qualified for the job, having obtained her degree from an unaccredited institution.

=== Foreign policy ===
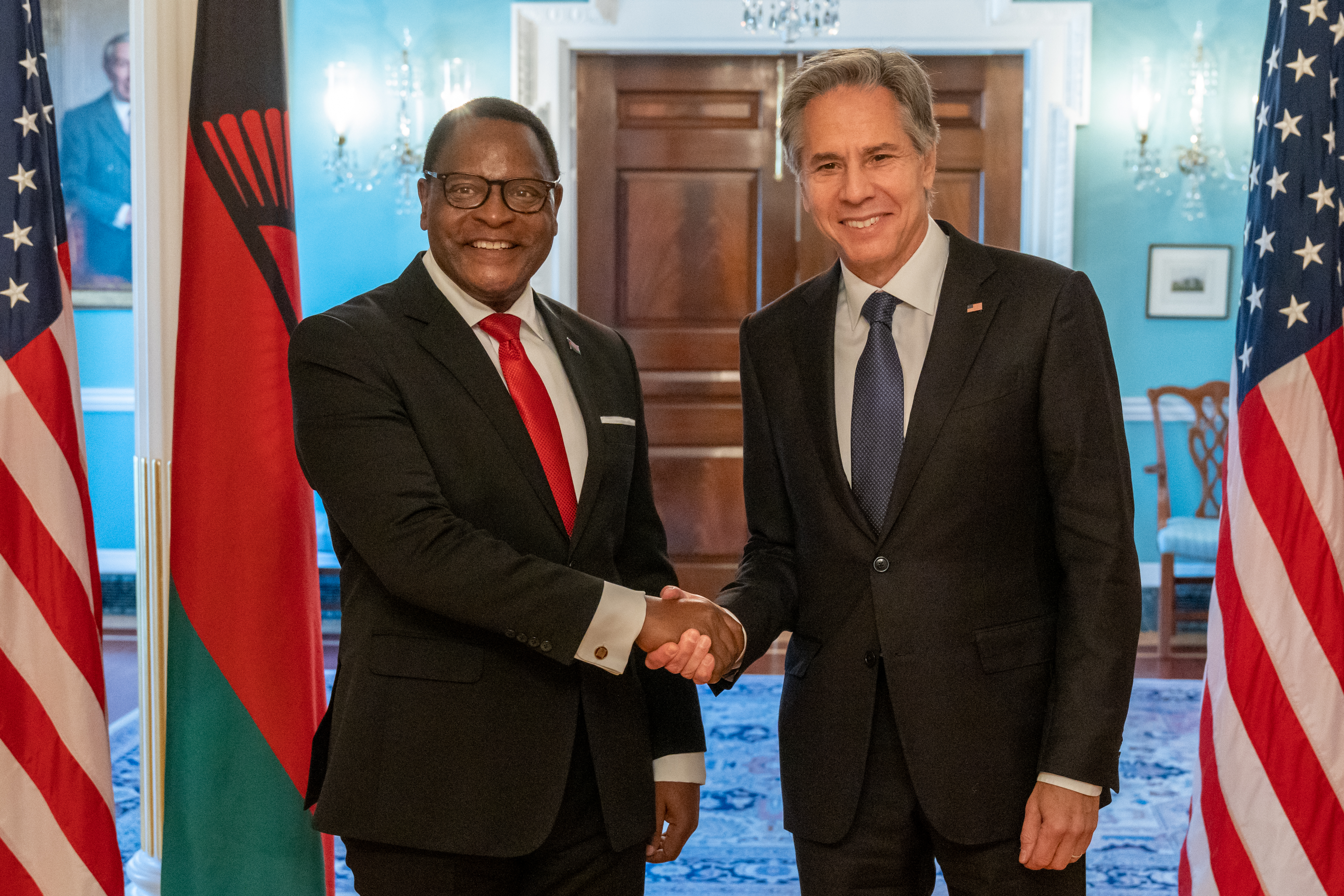
Chakwera with US Secretary of State Antony Blinken in 2022

President Chakwera formed a strong and positive relationship with British prime minister Boris Johnson, describing their partnership as "crucial." Prime Minister Boris Johnson expressed hope for a long-term UK-Malawi partnership that focused on promoting green technologies in Malawi, and Malawi's government spokesperson and Minister of Information, Gospel Kazako said that Johnson and President Chakwera would discuss "various development, trade and investment deals, which so far has been a great success and Malawi stands to benefit more and better." After the 2021 Zambian general election in which Edgar Lungu lost to Hakainde Hichilema and then gracefully accepted the results of the election, President Chakwera said: "The pattern of peaceful transitions of power we have been seeing in our region in recent years, ... (with) Zambia being the latest member to embody that, are worthy of global acclaim and our applause."

=== Domestic policy ===
On 16 November 2023, Chakwera announced the immediate suspension of all international travel orders for himself and his government to reduce costs following a 44% devaluation of the Malawian Kwacha and an agreement to borrow $174-million from the International Monetary Fund to boost the country's ailing economy. He also ordered the immediate return of all ministers currently abroad and a 50% reduction in fuel allowances for senior government officials. Chakwera also ordered a reduction of income tax on individuals to help ease cost-of-living issues.

=== Reelection defeat ===
Chakwera ran for a second term as president in the 2025 Malawian general election on 16 September, but lost to his predecessor, Peter Mutharika, who won more than 56% of the vote.

== Post-presidency ==
=== Commonwealth envoy to Tanzania (2025) ===
In November 2025, Chakwera was appointed by Commonwealth Secretary-General Shirley Botchwey as Special Envoy to support political dialogue in Tanzania following its disputed election. He undertook a four-day mission meeting government, opposition, civil society, and religious leaders to assess the situation. His appointment drew some criticism from a Tanzanian human rights group questioning his suitability for the role.

=== Public criticism ===
In November 2025, Malawi’s civil society group CDEDI argued that Chakwera should not receive former president's privileges, citing governance shortcomings, corruption concerns, and alleged abuses during his administration. The organisation, through its Executive Director Sylvester Namiwa, also urged international bodies, including SADC and Commonwealth, to refrain from granting him honorary roles until these issues were addressed.

In the same month, the Malawi Police Service obtained a court warrant to search Chakwera’s private residence in Area 10, Lilongwe as part of an investigation into the disappearance of four State-owned security dogs allegedly taken from Kamuzu Palace. A day later, the Lilongwe Magistrate’s Court temporarily blocked the search after Chakwera’s lawyers argued the warrant was obtained on misleading grounds and objected to procedural irregularities.

Political offices
Preceded by Peter Mutharika	President of Malawi; 2020–2025	Succeeded by Peter Mutharika
