= Constitution of Malawi =

The Constitution of Malawi serves as the fundamental legal framework for governing Malawi. It was adopted on May 16, 1994.
