= President of Malawi =

Head of state and government

President of the Republic of Malawi
- Mtsogoleri wa Dziko la Malawi (Chichewa); Mlongozgi wa Charu cha Malaŵi (Tumbuka)
- Presidential Standard

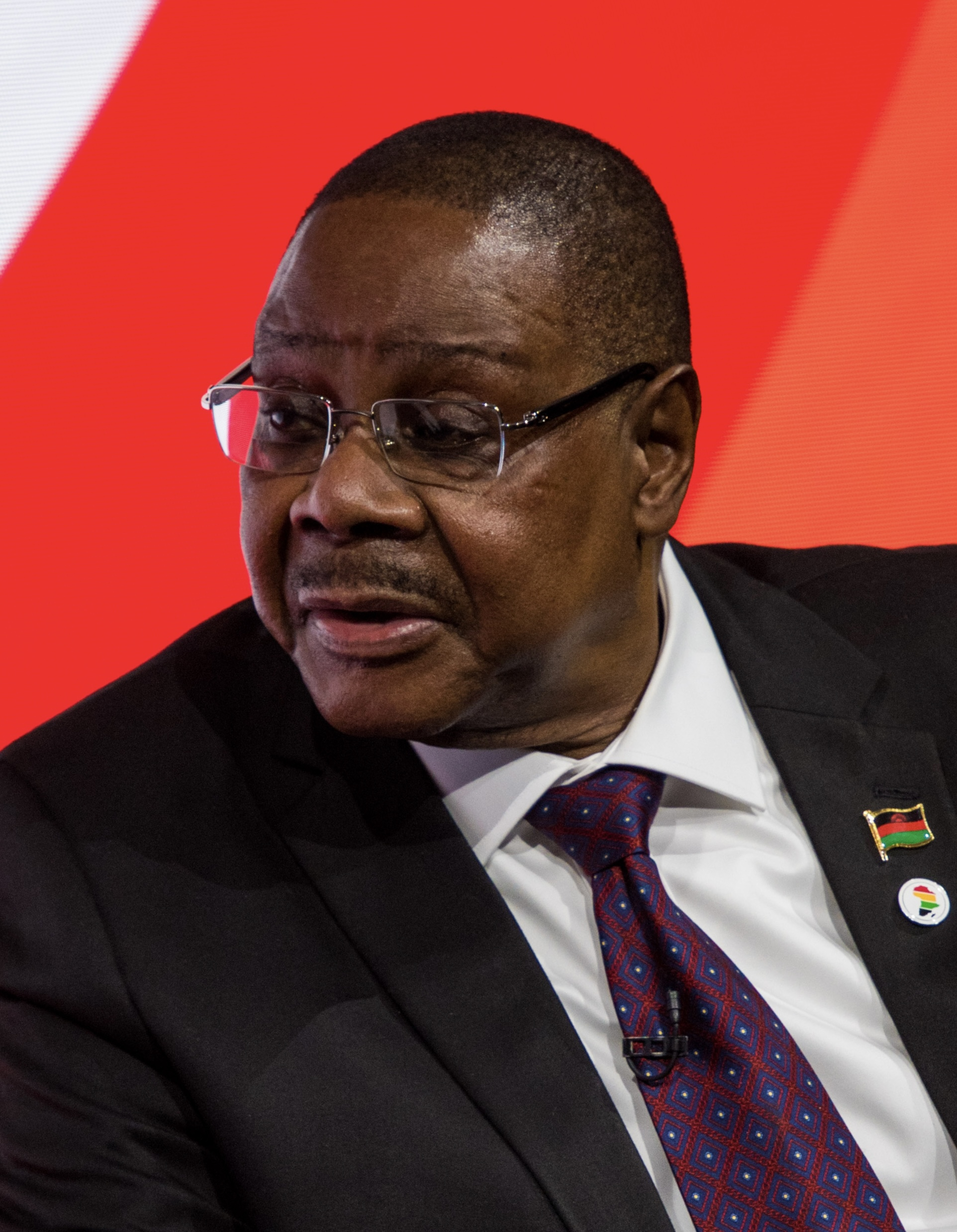
- Incumbent; Peter Mutharika since 4 October 2025
- Executive branch of the Malawian Government
- Style: His Excellency (formal)
- Member of: Cabinet
- Residence: Kamuzu Palace, Lilongwe, Malawi
- Seat: Kamuzu Palace, Lilongwe, Malawi
- Term length: Five years, renewable once consecutively
- Constituting instrument: Constitution of Malawi (1991)
- Formation: 6 July 1966; 60 years ago
- First holder: Hastings Banda
- Deputy: Vice President of Malawi
- Salary: 77,509,760 Malawian kwacha (US $74,300) annually
- Website: statehouse.mw

The president of the Republic of Malawi (Chichewa: Mtsogoleri wa Dziko la Malawi; Tumbuka: Mlongozgi wa Charu cha Malaŵi) is the head of state and head of government of Malawi. The president leads the executive branch of the Government of Malawi and is the commander-in-chief of the Malawian Defence Force. The current president is Peter Mutharika, who has served since being re-elected in September 2025.

== Executive branch ==
Under the 1995 constitution, the president, who is both head of state and head of government, is chosen through universal direct suffrage every five years. Malawi has a vice-president who is elected with the president. The president has the option of appointing a second vice-president, who must be from a different party. It also includes a presidentially appointed cabinet. The members of the cabinet of Malawi can be drawn from either within or outside of the legislature. The President is also concurrently the Minister of Defence.

Peter Mutharika was sworn in as president of Malawi on 4 October 2025 in Blantyre.

== Origins of the presidency ==
On 6 July 1964, Nyasaland became independent from British rule and renamed itself Malawi, with Elizabeth II as Queen of Malawi. Under a new constitution in 1966, Malawi became a republic with prime minister Hastings Banda becoming its first president. Under the country's 1966, 1994 and 1995 constitutions, the president is executive head of state and government, and serves a five-year term. The first president, Banda, was elected by the National Assembly, and was named president for life in 1971. Subsequent presidents have been popularly elected.

After the restoration of multiparty democracy in 1993, the presidency was hedged about with a number of checks and balances to prevent its total dominance over the political system.

== Election to the presidency ==
The president is elected by a majority vote (50% + 1) of the electorate through direct, universal and equal suffrage. All Malawian citizens that have attained the age of 18 are eligible to vote in all elections. Every presidential candidate shall declare who shall be the vice-president if elected at the time of the candidate's nomination. The vice-president shall be elected concurrently with the president, with both names on the ballot.

== Term limits ==
As of 2021, the Constitution of Malawi limits a president to two consecutive five-year terms but there is no limit on the total number of terms. There was an attempt to modify the term limits in 2003 for Bakili Muluzi, but it did not materialize.

== See also ==
- List of colonial heads of Malawi (Nyasaland)
- List of heads of state of Malawi
- List of heads of government of Malawi
- Lists of incumbents
