= 2020 Malawian presidential election =

- 23 June 2020
- Registered: 6,859,570
- Turnout: 64.81% (▼9.63 pp)
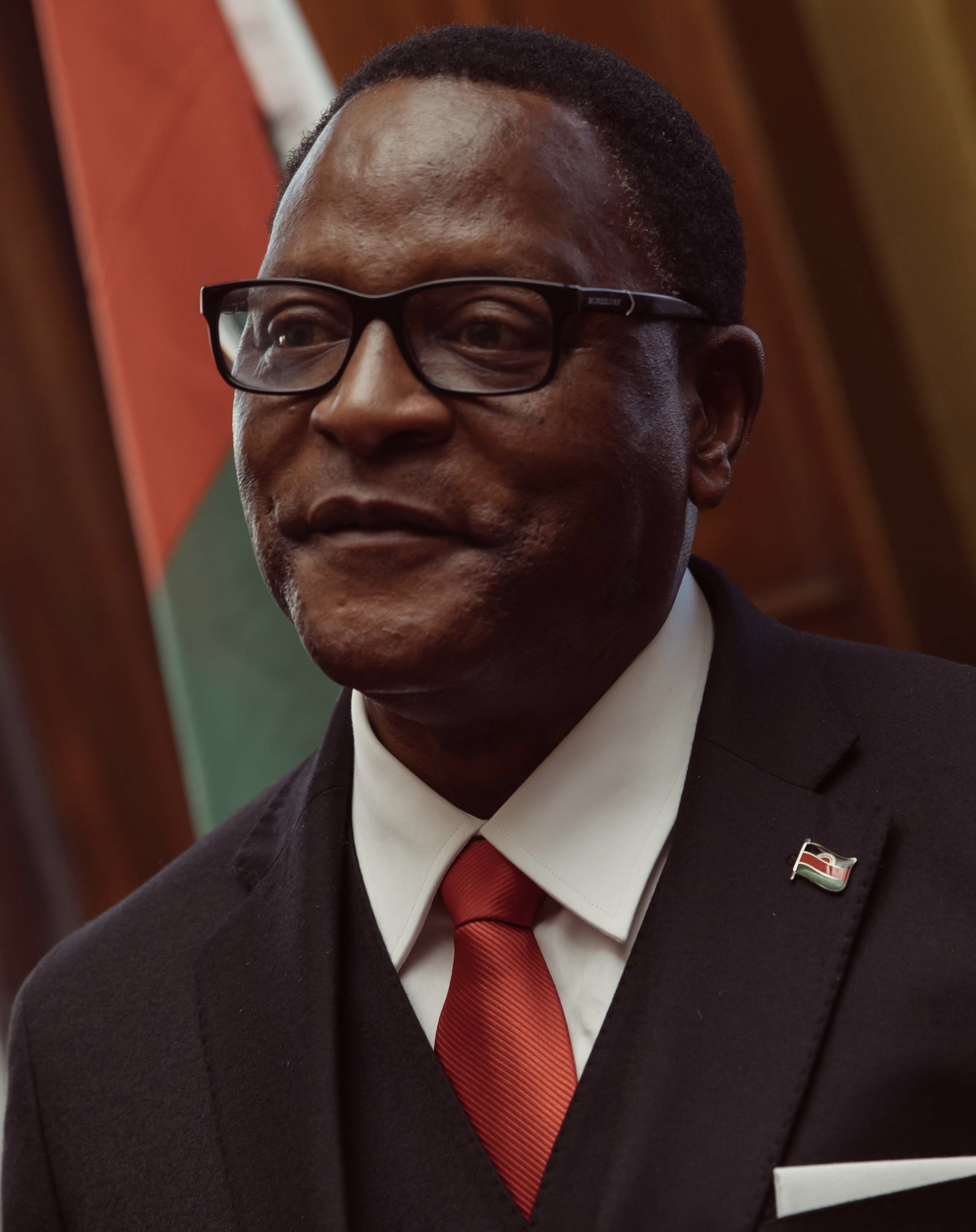

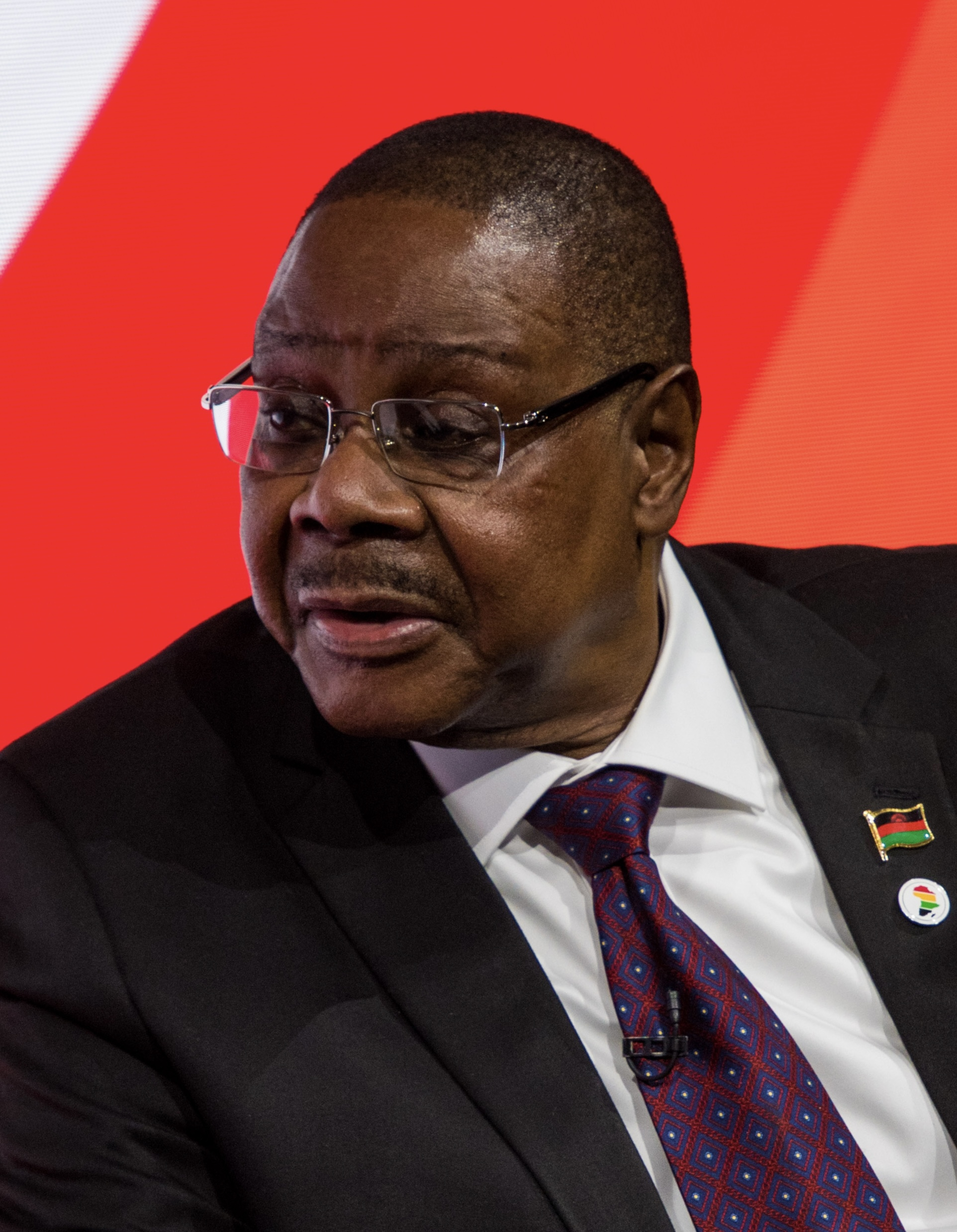
Nominee	Lazarus Chakwera	Peter Mutharika
Party	MCP	DPP
Running mate	Saulos Chilima	Atupele Muluzi
Popular vote	2,604,043	1,751,877
Percentage	59.34%	39.92%
- Results by region (left) and district (right)
President before election
Peter Mutharika
DPP
Elected President
Lazarus Chakwera
MCP

Presidential elections were held in Malawi on 23 June 2020, having originally been scheduled for 19 May and later 2 July. They followed the annulment of the results of the 2019 presidential elections, in which Peter Mutharika of the Democratic Progressive Party had received the most votes.

The result of the re-run elections was a victory for Lazarus Chakwera of the Malawi Congress Party, who defeated Mutharika by margin of 59% to 40%.

The elections were hailed by observers as being both free and fair.

== Background ==
In the May 2019 general elections, incumbent President Peter Mutharika of the Democratic Progressive Party (DPP) was re-elected with 39% of the vote, defeating Lazarus Chakwera of the Malawi Congress Party (35%) and Saulos Chilima of the United Transformation Movement (20%). The DPP also remained the largest party in the National Assembly, winning 62 of the 193 seats. However, the presidential election was challenged in court by Chakwera and Chilima, and on 3 February 2020 the Constitutional Court annulled the presidential election results, citing evidence of irregularities, and ordered fresh elections be held within 150 days.

Parliament passed the Parliamentary and Presidential Elections Act (PPEA) Amendment Bill on 24 February, setting 19 May as the date for the new presidential elections and extending the terms of MPs and local councillors by one year to allow for harmonised presidential, parliamentary and local elections in 2025. In March the Malawi Electoral Commission announced a new election date, 2 July, one day before the 150-day limit to hold elections set by the Constitutional Court. On 21 May the Legal Affairs committee of parliament endorsed fresh presidential elections to be held on 23 June rather than 2 July.

== Electoral system ==
As a result of the Constitutional Court ruling, the President of Malawi would be elected using the two-round system, replacing the former first-past-the-post system used in 2019.

== Candidates ==
Lazarus Chakwera and Peter Kuwani filed their respective nominations on 6 May 2020. Peter Mutharika filed his nomination the following day, with Atupele Muluzi as his running mate.

== Opinion polls ==
A poll conducted by IPOR Malawi showed that 53% of respondents expected Lazarus Chakwera to win the election, while 31% expected Mutharika to win.

On a national level, according to the polls, 51% would vote for Chakwera, while 33% for Mutharika and 0.2% for Peter Kuwani.

Another poll by Afrobarometer suggested that Chakwera was most likely to win the election.

== Results ==
Candidate	Running mate	Party	Votes	%
Lazarus Chakwera	Saulos Chilima	Malawi Congress Party	2,604,043	59.34
Peter Mutharika	Atupele Muluzi	Democratic Progressive Party	1,751,877	39.92
Peter Kuwani	Archibald Kalawang'oma	Mbakuwaku Movement for Development	32,456	0.74
Total			4,388,376	100.00
Valid votes			4,388,376	98.71
Invalid/blank votes			57,323	1.29
Total votes			4,445,699	100.00
Registered voters/turnout			6,859,570	64.81
Source: Malawi Electoral Commission

== Reactions ==
Opposition figures in other African countries have been reportedly congratulating Chakwera's victory, including the leader of Zimbabwe's Movement for Democratic Change, Nelson Chamisa, leader of Tanzania's Alliance for Change and Transparency, Zitto Kabwe, former leader of South Africa's Democratic Alliance, Mmusi Maimane, leader of Zambia's National Democratic Congress Chishimba Kambwili, and aspiring presidential candidate for the 2021 Ugandan general election Henry Tumukunde.

== Aftermath ==
In August 2021 the DPP appealed to the Supreme Court to annul the election results on the basis that in June 2020 the High Court had cancelled the appointments of four DPP members who had been appointed to the Malawi Electoral Commission prior to the elections. The DPP claimed that this meant the 2020 elections had been managed by incorrectly appointed members, and was therefore null and void. The Constitutional Court rejected the Democratic Progressive Party's application for the nullification of the elections, describing it as an abuse of court process and an attempt by the DPP to benefit from its own illegality.
