= Education in Malawi =

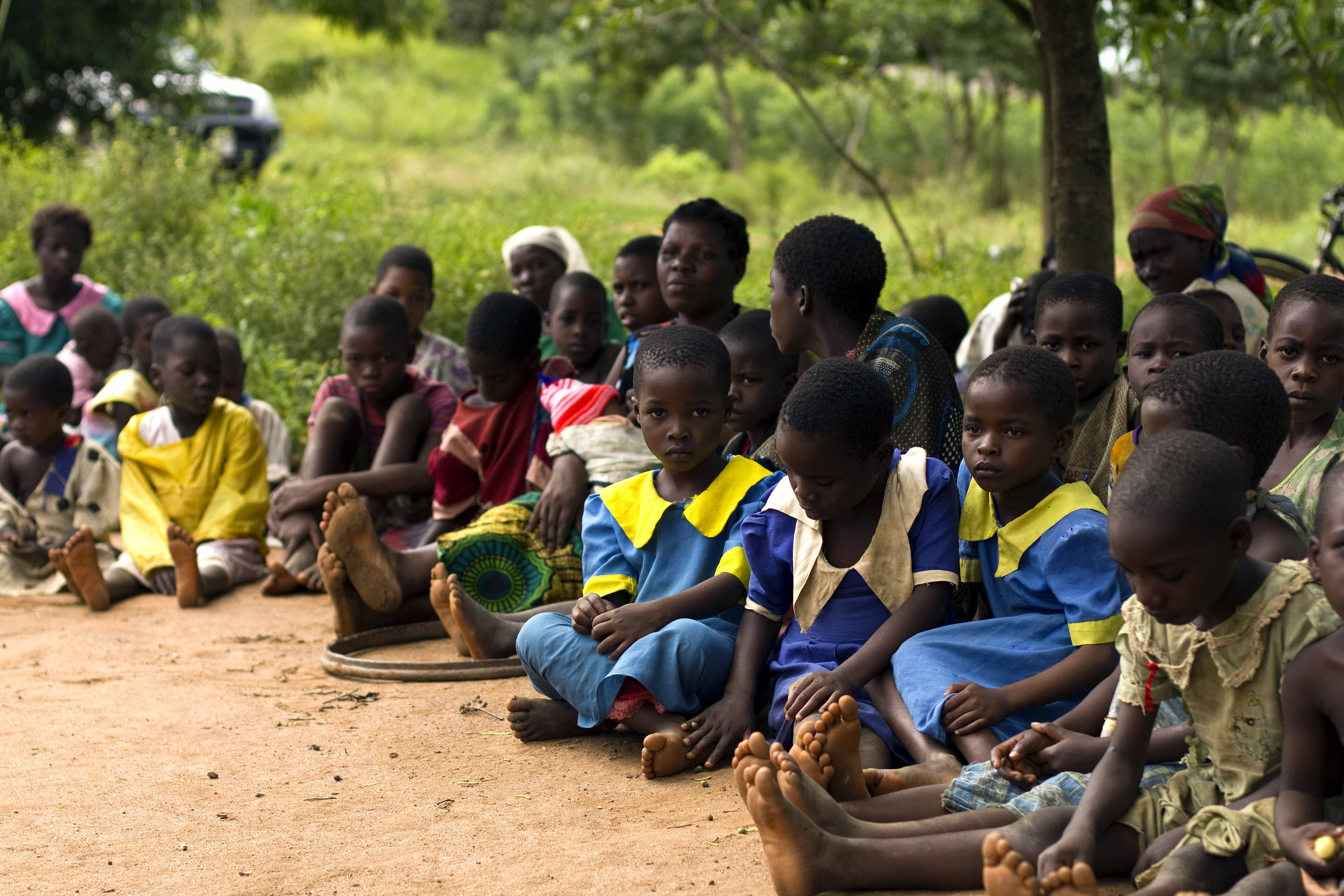
Primary school students at an outdoor meeting in Malawi

Education in Malawi stresses academic preparation leading to access to secondary school and universities. However, few students go on to high school or university. The dropout rate is also very high particularly among primary school pupils.

== Primary education ==
Primarily schools are mostly in two categories of assisted (public) and unassisted (private) schools. Villages and hamlets throughout the country have such schools. By 1970, there were approximately 2,000 primary schools for 35 percent of primary school aged youth. About 12 percent of all primary school students attended private, predominantly church run schools.

== Secondary school education ==
Secondary education developed late in Malawi, because of little effort or neglect in secondary education during the colonial era. Malawi has five types of secondary schools. These include aided boarding schools, aided day schools, government boarding-secondary schools, government day secondary schools, and private secondary schools. Most secondary teachers are qualified and hold either degrees or diplomas. The development charity Christian Aid refers to educational fees as an obstacle to educational access in Malawi.

In the curriculum, agriculture is a compulsory subject for all students. Wood working, metal work, and technical drawing are encouraged for boys, and home economics is encouraged for girls. One of the biggest criticisms of secondary schools in Malawi is that they are too university-oriented and need to teach more technical skills. Most students immediately enter the workforce and need a different orientation. Therefore, secondary schools do not produce as many graduates as the labor market demands. In fact, only one-fourth of Malawi's youth end up attending secondary school.

== Public school system ==
The government established free primary education for all children in 1994, which increased attendance rates, according to UNICEF. In 1994, the gross primary enrollment rate was 133.9 percent, and the net primary enrollment rate was 102.6 percent. In 1995, 62 percent of students entering primary school reached grade two, and 34 percent reached grade five. The dropout rate is higher among girls than boys.

== Private school system ==
Private schools have risen in Malawi and offer an alternative to public schools. Private schools include school like Tukombo Private Girls Secondary School, Bedir IS, Phungu, Lilongwe Girls, Hossana Private School and Sunnyside School. Some consolidates private schools are run by the Designated Schools Board.

Tukombo private girls secondary school established in 1998, run NY nkhatabay development trust.

The Bedir Foundation, founded in 2000, owns two schools: Bedir Star International school, Lilongwe and Bedir International school, Blantyre. Both use Cambridge International Examinations syllabus, as well as MANEB.

=== Charitable Foundation schools ===
Many independent schools have been set up as charitable foundations in Malawi with a specific targeted pupil:

- The Jacaranda Foundation, founded by nanny Marie Da Silva, maintains the Jacaranda School. It is Malawi's only entirely free school for primary and secondary students. The vast majority of students of the Jacaranda School are orphaned by the HIV/AIDS pandemic, as featured on 2008 CNN Heroes.
- St Patricks academy & primary
- Determined to Develop is a registered United States charity that, among other activities, supports the 500 student Wasambo High School
- The Joyce Banda Foundation is a foundation that runs schools for primary and secondary schools in Malawi.
- The Raising Malawi foundation is in the process of building a school aimed at female education in Malawi.
- The Legson Kayira Primary School and Community Center
- The Youth of Malawi foundation has built a solar-powered, rainwater harvesting primary school in the village of Chimphamba, in the Mchinji district of rural Malawi.
- The El Shaddai School (part of the Martin Academy) in Chiwembe village near Limbe. The school has been built using charitable donations by the UK Charity Alcohelp (No 1104811) The school welcomes children from the village into nursery, reception and standard 1-6 The Martin Academy funds a sponsor-me scheme for less advantaged children.
- The Imago Foundation is a newly registered charity that is going to build a nursery and primary school in Mangochi district (which has some of the worst measures of education levels out of every district in Malawi). The charity has the additional aims of improving nutrition and protecting the natural environment by using permaculture methods. It is also supported by the UK charity, Imago Malawi.

== University system ==
The university sector in Malawi is composed of four public universities and several private universities. No university in Malawi is included in either the Times Higher or QS World University Rankings. Malawi has among the lowest rates of participation in university education in the world, with less than 1% of college age people attending university in the country. There are some efforts to improve access to higher education, particularly for women, who are typically under-represented in Malawian institutions.

The public universities are (in order of founding):

University of Malawi

Malawi's first and largest tertiary educational institution is the University of Malawi. It was founded in 1964 and operates on several campuses.

Mzuzu University

Mzuzu University was founded in 1997 and is one of the principal universities of Malawi. The university is located in Mzuzu city in the northern region of the country. MZUNI offers programmes through both face-to face and open, distance and e-learning (ODeL) modes. Students can attend these programmes on block, week-end and vacation releases.

Lilongwe University of Agriculture and Natural Resources

Lilongwe University of Agriculture and Natural Resources is a university outside Lilongwe, Malawi. It was formed in 2011 by a merger between Bunda College of Agriculture of the University of Malawi and Natural Resources College (NRC).

The Malawi University of Science and Technology

The Malawi University of Science and Technology (MUST), sometimes referred to as the University of Southern Malawi, was established on 17 December 2012 by the Malawi University of Science and Technology Act No. 31 of 2012 as the fourth Public University in Malawi. It was officially opened in 2014 by Professor Peter Mutharika, LL.B(Hons), J.D.S. It's situated in the prestigious shire highlands in Thyolo, Malawi. This institution is occupying a total plot area of 215,000 m^{2} (21.5 ha; 53 acres) and has total building area of 46,000 m^{2} (55,000 sq yd). The seating capacity of this university is 3000 but can accommodate about twice that seating capacity. Evidently, this university will hugely contribute to the government of Malawi's efforts to widening access to higher education.

Once fully operational, the university will have the Malawi Institute of Technology, Ndata School of Climate & Earth Sciences, Academy of Medical Sciences and the Bingu School of Culture and Heritage. The Malawi Industrial Research and Technology Development Centre will be part of the MIT.

Private universities in Malawi include the following:

Central Christian University

Central Christian University (CCU) is a research-based Private-Not-Profit University dedicated to provide Open and Distance Learning programmes in Malawi.

Catholic University of Malawi

The university is located in Montfort campus in Chiladzulu District in Malawi. It was established in 2004 and opened in 2006, with faculties of social science and education. It now additionally offers economics, marketing, business administration, and accounting.

University fees recently increased sixfold to about £380 per year, more than double Malawi’s legal minimum wage.

== Teaching and education profession ==
The Ministry of Education develops the curricula used in Malawi's schools and oversee teacher training. Teachers take both pedagogical and academic courses. Supervised practical teaching is expected before teaching independently. Most teachers begin as primary school teachers in a demonstration school adjacent to teacher training facilities. Later, block teaching is tried during which the teacher trainee tries teaching a class on their own for six weeks. Three types of lecturers educate potential teachers. Graduate teacher educators chair most departments, aided by diplomate and non-diplomate assistants.

=== Primary teachers ===
Malawi has four professional teaching Grades (PT) of primary school teachers. The PT4 teacher holds a Malawi School Certificate of Education (MSCE) which is four years of secondary school education, and a two-year Teachers Certificate. PT3 is obtained after going through interviews after serving for fours at PT4 Grade. PT2 and PT1 they are also obtained through interviews. However, PT2 is an administrative grade (Deputy Head teacher) while PT1 is reserved for the head teacher, primary education advisors and field supervisors.

=== Secondary teachers ===
Secondary school teachers are trained at the School of Education. This school awards three types of professional qualifications, which are: Diploma of Education, Bachelor of Education and the University Certificate of Education.

=== University lecturers ===
Malawi citizens who serve as professors constitute 30 percent of the university's faculty. In 1977, a total of 87 of the 199 working faculty or 87 percent were expatriates. While 27 percent of the professoriat were from Malawi and a further 48 percent were pursuing advanced degrees abroad. There is a need both to upgrade or develop personnel currently serving as professors and to train many more Malawians to fill these posts.

=== Non-governmental organisations ===
Wungwero Book Foundation trains teacher librarians at the DAPP teacher training college. AYISE, a large non-governmental organization based in Blantyre, Malawi, provides education at its youth center and works with local schools.

== Notable Malawian educators ==
- Joyce Banda - former President of Malawi, founder of the Joyce Banda Foundation
- Frank Chipasula - author, poet and educator
- Peter Mutharika - former President of Malawi, professor of law, international law advisor
- Anjimile Oponyo - educator

== Notable Malawian scholars ==
- Frank Chipasula - author, poet and educator
- William Kamkwamba - Malawian student who gained fame after building a windmill from spare parts

== See also ==
- List of universities in Malawi
