= Human rights in Malawi =

The history of human rights in Malawi during recent decades is complicated.

Until 1994, conditions were unsatisfactory. Things improved after the ratification in that year of Malawi's new, "unusually progressive" constitution, which introduced multi-party democracy. However, toward the end of the presidency of Bingu wa Mutharika, who died in office in April 2012, the situation worsened, only to improve rapidly following the accession to the presidency of Mutharika's vice-president, Joyce Banda.

== Historical perspective ==
The International Foundation for the Protection of Human Rights noted in late 2011 that Malawi was “once considered a country where civil society could express itself freely.”

A 2010 report by the British High Commission stated that Malawi had “made good progress on human rights since the introduction of multi-party democracy” in 1994, when Malawi's Constitution went into effect. The British report noted that Malawi's Constitution “protects fundamental rights,” that the country “has signed up to most international treaties,” and that there were “no political prisoners in Malawi jails as was the case during the one-party era.” The report also pointed to progress “in the areas of macroeconomic stability and access to basic social and economic rights such as health, education, food security and justice,” while calling for improvements “in the areas of press freedom, freedom of assembly and speech and the rights of minority groups.”

However, an empirical study of human rights education and advocacy on the ground found that the concept of human rights had been translated into Chichewa, Malawi's most widely spoken language, without proper consultation among its speakers, resulting in a certain elitism among the early human rights advocates and unease about their mission among the population.

Toward the end of the presidency (2004–2012) of Bingu wa Mutharika, the human-rights situation in Malawi deteriorated significantly. According to a U.S. State Department report on human-rights conditions in Malawi in 2010, the major human-rights problems included “police use of excessive force, which resulted in deaths and injuries; security force impunity, although the government made some efforts to prosecute abusers; occasional mob violence; harsh and life-threatening prison conditions; arbitrary arrest and detention; lengthy pretrial detention; limits on freedom of speech and the press; official corruption; societal violence against women; trafficking in persons; and child labor.”

In late 2011, the International Foundation for the Protection of Human Rights described Malawi as having “descended into a spiral of authoritarianism in recent years,” and indicated that “[t]he situation deteriorated further in early 2011 when civil society reacted to corruption scandals and high commodity prices with demands for reform and good governance. The Government, mindful of events in North Africa, reacted with force. The authorities made statements inciting violence against human rights defenders and civil society leaders.”

Similarly, a Human Rights Watch report described Malawi's human-rights situation as having “deteriorated significantly in 2011, with President Bingu wa Mutharika’s government acting in an increasingly repressive manner.” During the year, Mutharika had “signed repressive new legislation, including Section 46 of the penal code, which allows the minister of information to ban publications deemed 'contrary to the public interest.'” A new Injunctions Law prohibiting the filing of civil suits against government officials. University lecturers and students who had criticized the government’s human-rights failures had been harassed, and a university student who was vice-president of Youth for Freedom and Democracy (YFD) had been “found dead at the Polytechnic campus with a deep cut to his head. Although police ruled his death a suicide, civil society activists accused the government of involvement in Chasowa’s death.”

The human-rights crisis in Malawi came to a head on July 20, 2011, when Malawian police killed 19 unarmed individuals who were taking part in nationwide protests against economic conditions and against the increasing repression under President Mutharika. About five hundred persons were arrested, and a number of journalists were beaten or otherwise restrained from covering the protests and atrocities.

Mutharika's aggression toward human-rights activists and other opponents of his regime continued. In September firebombs were thrown at the homes or offices of several critics of the government; in October police arrested five anti-government activists for “holding an illegal demonstration.” In March 2012, journalists and activists were warned that anyone insulting the president would be prosecuted and face jail time. On March 16, the head of the Malawi Human Rights Commission was arrested without a warrant and charged with possession of “materials with seditious words,” although no such materials were in fact found. On March 21, a leading member of the opposition party, the United Democratic Front, was arrested and charged with inciting violence.

On March 23, Human Rights Watch commented with concern on the Mutharika government's “recent surge of arrests and threats against critics,” which it described as reflecting a “broader crackdown on free speech and other basic rights.” The human-rights situation in Malawi became so dire that over the course of 2011, Britain, the United States, Germany, the World Bank, the EU, the African Development Bank, and Norway all suspended or partially froze aid to the country, in response to which an angry Mutharika refused to meet with World Bank and IMF delegations accused donor nations of providing financial support to his opponents.

In April 2012, President Mutharika died suddenly, and Vice-President Joyce Banda became president. In August 2012, Human Rights Watch noted that Malawi had “made notable progress” in human rights since the accession to the presidency of Banda, who had introduced greater media freedom, was calling for the repeal of antigay laws, and was threatening “to arrest President Omar al-Bashir of Sudan, who is wanted for war crimes by the International Criminal Court, if he tries to enter her country.” Under Banda, the donor nations that had wholly or partly suspended their aid to Malawi resumed providing support.

At a June 2012 press conference in Malawi, UN Deputy High Commissioner for Human Rights Kyung-wha Kang said that Banda had “swiftly moved to tackle many pressing human rights concerns” and praised “her strong commitment to advancing human rights and the welfare of the people of Malawi.” Observing that “Malawi has a very progressive constitution with strong human rights provisions, and a good set of laws and institutions in place to promote and protect human rights,” Kyung-wha Kang said that “[i]t is now time to strengthen a culture of human rights and the rule of law in Government institutions and in the individuals responsible for the protection, promotion and fulfilment of the full range of human rights for the people of Malawi.” Kyung-wha Kang emphasized that Malawians, emerging “from a period of political repression,” needed “to hear from their leadership that the fundamental freedoms of expression, association and assembly will be respected fully, and to see concrete actions taken to demonstrate this commitment.”

One indication of the change in attitude toward human rights under Banda was her announcement in June 2012 that Malawi, which had been scheduled to host the African Union (AU) summit in July, would not host it if President Omar al-Bashir of Sudan, who is wanted by the International Criminal Court for war crimes, genocide, and crimes against humanity, were allowed to attend. “Malawian President Joyce Banda took a strong stance in support of justice despite tough pressure from the African Union,” said Undule Mwakasungula, director of the Malawi Centre for Human Rights and Rehabilitation. “Malawi has done right by Darfur victims today.”

Although the human-rights situation has definitely improved under Banda, “some Malawians,” according to the Voice of America, “have been accusing human rights groups of deliberately muting their criticisms of the new administration,” saying that it “has failed to respond to consumers affected by currency devaluation and price hikes.” The VOA quotes Billy Banda, executive director of the human-rights organization Malawi Watch, as saying that his and other groups “were not deliberately keeping quiet” but were instead “lobbying silently” in order to help Banda's government survive through a difficult time. “But by giving support, that does not necessarily mean that were condoning the current administration. We are urging the administration to open a window of interaction so that whenever people raise concerns they should take heed.”

The following chart shows Malawi's ratings since 1972 in the Freedom in the World reports, published annually by Freedom House. A rating of 1 is "free"; 7, "not free".^{1}

Historical ratings

Year	Political Rights	Civil Liberties	Status	President^{2}
1972	7	6	Not Free	Hastings Banda
1973	7	6	Not Free	Hastings Banda
1974	7	6	Not Free	Hastings Banda
1975	7	6	Not Free	Hastings Banda
1976	7	6	Not Free	Hastings Banda
1977	7	6	Not Free	Hastings Banda
1978	6	7	Not Free	Hastings Banda
1979	6	7	Not Free	Hastings Banda
1980	6	7	Not Free	Hastings Banda
1981	6	7	Not Free	Hastings Banda
1982^{3}	6	7	Not Free	Hastings Banda
1983	6	7	Not Free	Hastings Banda
1984	6	7	Not Free	Hastings Banda
1985	6	7	Not Free	Hastings Banda
1986	6	7	Not Free	Hastings Banda
1987	6	7	Not Free	Hastings Banda
1988	6	7	Not Free	Hastings Banda
1989	7	6	Not Free	Hastings Banda
1990	7	6	Not Free	Hastings Banda
1991	7	6	Not Free	Hastings Banda
1992	6	7	Not Free	Hastings Banda
1993	6	5	Not Free	Hastings Banda
1994	2	3	Free	Hastings Banda
1995	2	3	Free	Bakili Muluzi
1996	2	3	Free	Bakili Muluzi
1997	2	3	Free	Bakili Muluzi
1998	2	3	Free	Bakili Muluzi
1999	3	3	Partly Free	Bakili Muluzi
2000	3	3	Partly Free	Bakili Muluzi
2001	4	3	Partly Free	Bakili Muluzi
2002	4	4	Partly Free	Bakili Muluzi
2003	3	4	Partly Free	Bakili Muluzi
2004	4	4	Partly Free	Bakili Muluzi
2005	4	4	Partly Free	Bingu wa Mutharika
2006	4	3	Partly Free	Bingu wa Mutharika
2007	4	4	Partly Free	Bingu wa Mutharika
2008	4	4	Partly Free	Bingu wa Mutharika
2009	3	4	Partly Free	Bingu wa Mutharika
2010	3	4	Partly Free	Bingu wa Mutharika
2011	3	4	Partly Free	Bingu wa Mutharika
2012	3	4	Partly Free	Bingu wa Mutharika
2013	3	4	Partly Free	Joyce Banda
2014	3	4	Partly Free	Joyce Banda
2015	3	3	Partly Free	Peter Mutharika
2016	3	3	Partly Free	Peter Mutharika
2017	3	3	Partly Free	Peter Mutharika
2018	3	3	Partly Free	Peter Mutharika
2019	3	3	Partly Free	Peter Mutharika
2020	3	3	Partly Free	Peter Mutharika
2021	3	3	Partly Free	Lazarus Chakwera
2022	3	3	Partly Free	Lazarus Chakwera
2023	3	3	Partly Free	Lazarus Chakwera

== Malawi Human Rights Commission ==
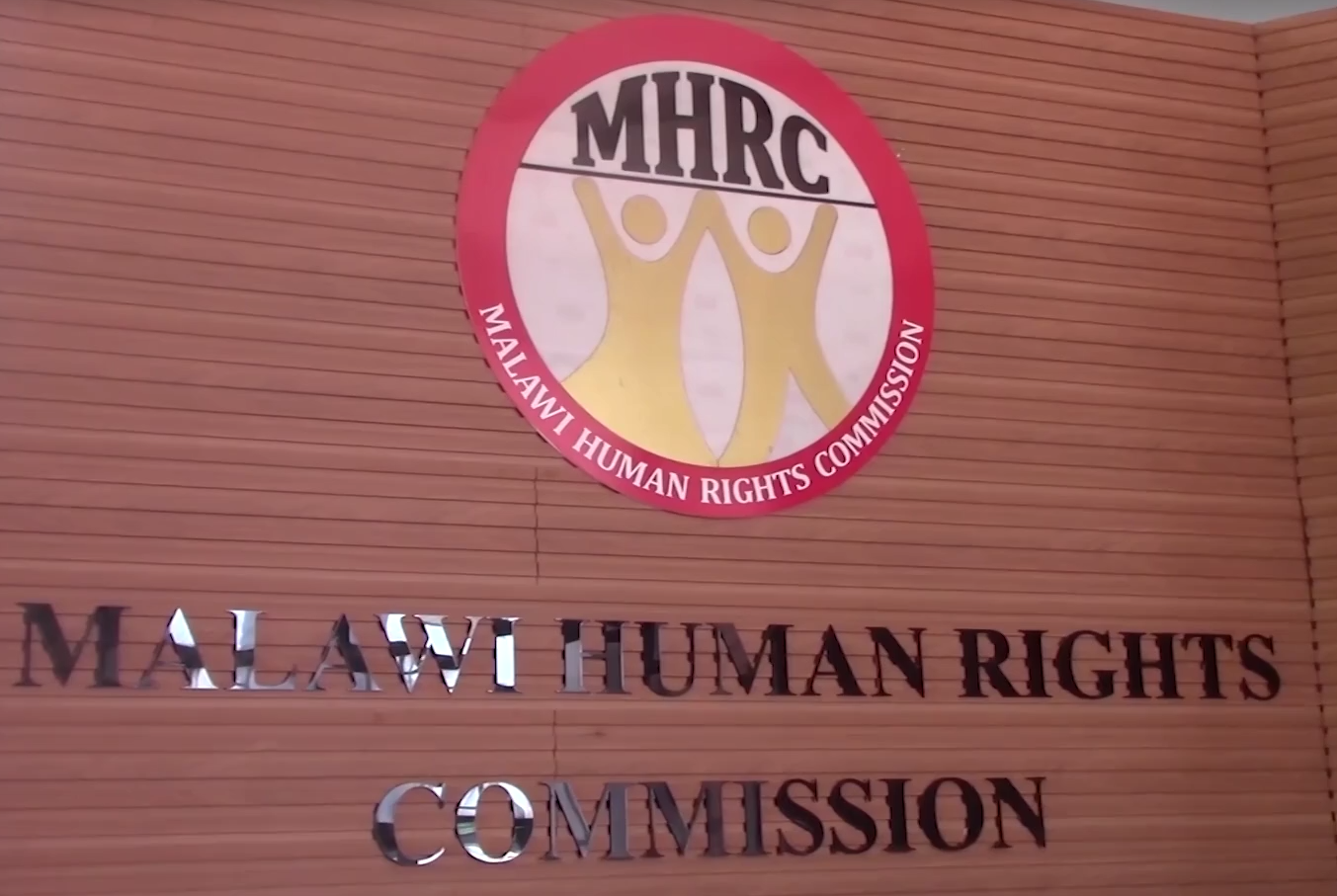
Malawi Human Rights Commission sign at Dzaleka Refugee Camp

The Malawi Human Rights Commission (MHRC) was established by the country's 1994 constitution and became fully functional in 1998 or 1999. It is charged with protecting human rights and investigating violations. The Commission has “broad powers to hear and obtain any necessary evidence, to conduct searches after obtaining a warrant issued by a magistrate, and to exercise 'unhindered authority' to visit detention center[s] 'with or without notice.'” It does not have the power to prosecute offenders, but it “can intervene in court cases and it has acted as amicus curiae.” Transparency International reported in 2004 that “the MHRC is perceived as one of the most efficient public institutions in the country.”

== Basic rights ==
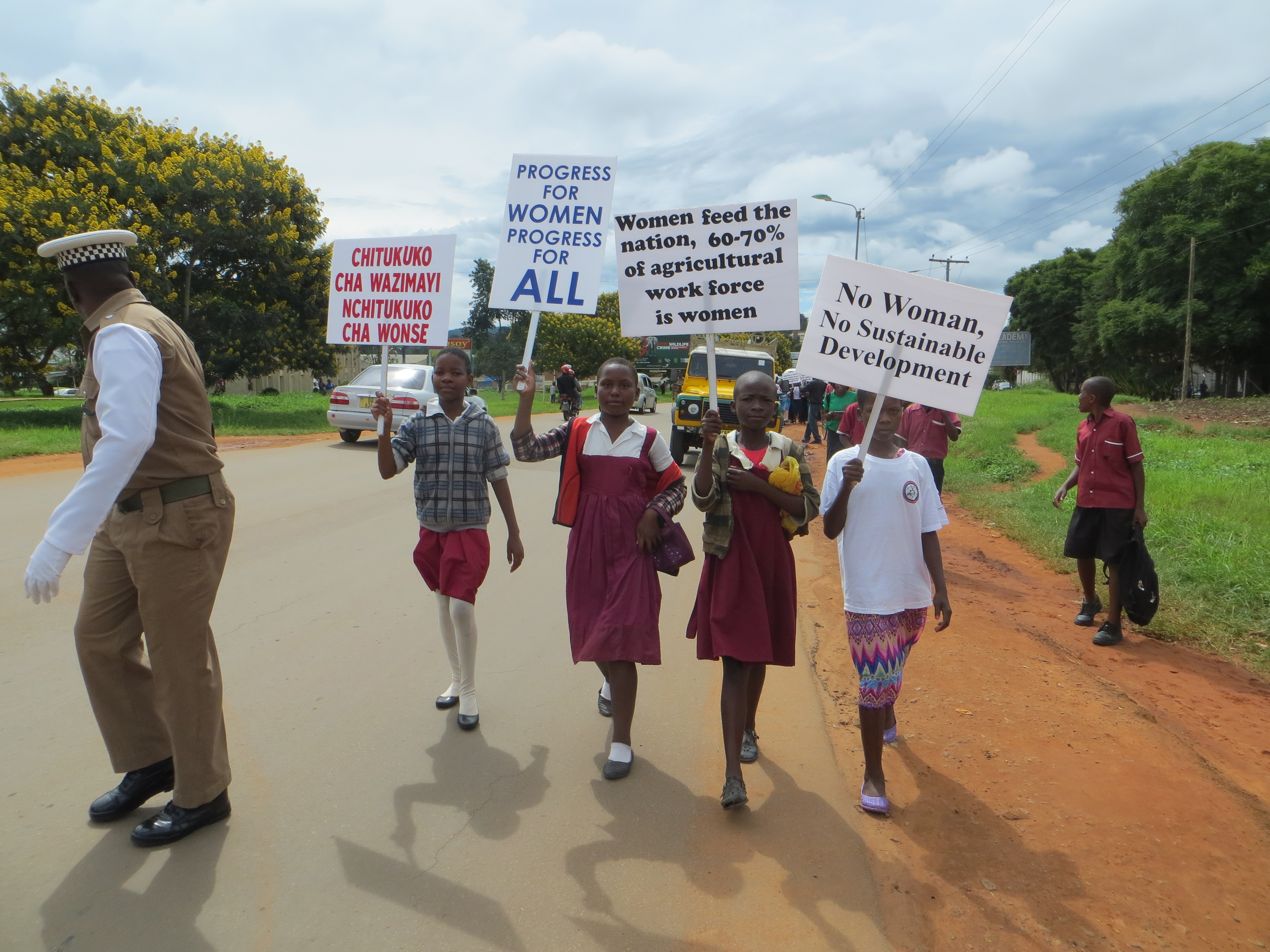
School Children funded by the Development Fund of Norway march on International Women's Day, 2016

The Malawian Constitution has often been described as very strong in its human-rights guarantees. The Bill of Rights included in the Constitution, according to the International Bar Association, explicitly protects “the rights to life, dignity, equality and the right to freedom of conscience, belief, thought and religion and to academic freedom.” It also protects “freedom of expression, freedom of information, freedom of movement and freedom of assembly. Any limit or restriction imposed on rights and freedoms must be consistent with Malawi’s obligations under international human rights law.”

The 2012 report of the Human Rights Institute of the International Bar Association indicates that even in the last days of Mutharika's regime, when the news media were subjected to “interference and harassment” and “incidents of intimidation,” they “remained relatively free” and continued to “present a diversity of opinion.” The report cited “the burning of vehicles of independent radio service Zodiak,” the death threats reportedly received by journalists, the arrest and beating of journalists at the July 2011 demonstrations, and the government-ordered “media blackout” of those demonstrations.

Under Banda, the constitutional protections of fundamental rights are being respected by the government to a far greater degree than during Mutharika's last years. For example, Section 46 of the Penal Code, under which a cabinet minister could shut down newspapers that were considered “contrary to the public interest,” has been repealed. The Injunction Law, under which government officials enjoyed immunity from prosecution, has also been repealed.

During her June 2012 visit to Malawi, UN Deputy High Commissioner for Human Rights Kyung-wha Kang noted that there were a “number of draft laws on matters including HIV/AIDS, gender equality, and trafficking in persons that are pending consideration,” and expressed hope “that the new laws will be in line with international human rights standards.”

== LGBT rights ==
The topic of LGBT rights has been unusually prominent, and has been the focus of great contention, during the last years of the Mutharika regime and the early months of the Banda administration.

Under Malawi's colonial-era sodomy laws, consensual same-sex behavior between men is punishable by up to 14 years in prison for men. In December 2009, under the presidency of Bingu wa Mutharika, two men were convicted of “unnatural practices between men and gross public indecency” and sentenced to 14 years at hard labor. After widespread public criticism of this harsh punishment, the president pardoned the men. In the same month, however, the parliament passed legislation that criminalized sex between women, making it punishable by as much as 5 years in prison.

Two Malawian activist groups, the Center for the Development of People (CEDEP) and the Center for Human Rights and Rehabilitation (CHRR), have long lobbied Malawian officials to change the law. In May 2012, in her first address to the nation after becoming president, Joyce Banda said that the laws against “unnatural acts and indecency” would be reviewed “as a matter of urgency,” and suggested that she would decriminalize homosexual acts by repealing Sections 153 and 156 of the Penal Code. This statement was widely noticed and applauded, with Canadian Foreign Affairs Minister John Baird praising Banda for her “commitment to repeal discriminatory legislation, including legislation that persecutes gays and lesbians.” In September 2012, however, Banda “told reporters from international media in September that Malawians might not be ready for such a change, and suggested that members of parliament should take the question of decriminalization back to their constituencies.”

In a radio debate on November 5, 2012, Justice Minister Ralph Kasambara announced a moratorium on arrests on charges of sodomy, an act that Human Rights Watch characterized as “a compromise position, which will permit parliament to debate possible legislative change.” At least part of the reason for Kasambara's action, reportedly, was a concern that Malawi's antigay law might violate the constitution's strong language about the “inherent dignity and worth of each human being” and “the rights and views of all individuals,” and that it was incompatible with the International Covenant on Civil and Political Rights, of which Malawi is a signatory.

Tiseke Kasambala of Human Rights Watch congratulated Malawi for taking “this bold step forward, putting respect for its own constitutional guarantees of equality front and center.” A representative of Amnesty International said that the organization “welcomes Minister Kasambara’s statement and hopes it serves as the first step towards ending discrimination and persecution based on real or perceived sexual orientation and gender identity in Malawi.” However, three days following his announcement of the moratorium, which had been fiercely criticized by Malawian church officials and by the Law Society, Minister Kasambara claimed that he had never declared any such moratorium and said “that laws carrying up to 14 years in prison for committing homosexual acts were still being enforced.”

== HIV/AIDS rights ==
There is great stigma associated with HIV/AIDS status in Malawi, and considerable discrimination. MHRC Commissioner Dalitso Kubalasa said in October 2012 that “HIV and AIDS is a human rights issue in that lack of respect for human rights increases the spread and impact of the epidemic. Furthermore, the disease exposes people who are affected by the virus to various human rights violations through stigma and discrimination.” He urged that district commissioners be given training that would reduce this stigma and discrimination.

== Rights of persons under arrest ==
A 2012 report by the Human Rights Institute of the International Bar Association, based on observations made before Banda's accession to the presidency, noted “the use of excessive force by the police, especially in the context of handling political dissent.” The report criticized police conduct during the demonstrations in July 2011, and focused on “the suspicious death of student activist and Youth for Freedom and Democracy Vice President, Robert Chasowa,” in September 2011, pointing out that “a post-mortem report contradicted police claims that Chasowa committed suicide,” indicating rather “that his injuries were most likely due to assault.” The reported noted “with satisfaction” that Banda had “appointed a commission of inquiry to investigate Chasowa’s death.”

In July 2012, the UN Deputy High Commissioner for Human Rights Kyung-wha Kang expressed “serious concerns about ill treatment and violence, in some cases leading to death, by the police against crime suspects.” Praising Banda's government for its determination to restore public trust in the police, Kyung-wha Kang said she looked forward “to seeing this commitment backed up by concrete actions, including training and efforts to fight impunity for such violations.” As a “welcome step in the right direction” she praised the “new police complaints mechanism.”

== Rights of persons on trial ==
During her July 2012 visit to Malawi, the UN human-rights official Kyung-wha Kang noted “shortcomings in the administration of justice in Malawi.” The MHRC has alleged “that certain members of the judiciary appear aligned to the executive and that this undermines the effectiveness of the MHRC.” Also, the Human Rights Institute of the International Bar Association noted in 2012 that the office of the Director of Public Prosecutions “is currently severely understaffed,” and lacking in experienced staffers. This causes major delays in the administration of justice, with “criminal cases...taking two to three years on average before trial.”

According to the International Bar Association, “the remuneration of judges and judicial support staff is a serious problem,” leading to concerns “that some judges might be more inclined to look to other, sometimes improper, ways of earning extra income.” Furthermore, the International Bar Association noted with concern that there is no specific qualification, training, or code of conduct for magistrates, and that most High Court and Supreme Court of Appeal judges “obtained their law degrees during the one party era, when human rights were not covered extensively in the curriculum,” a problem that the United Nations Office of the High Commissioner for Human Rights and other organizations have sought to remedy by organizing “workshops and seminars on human rights for the judiciary.”

== Rights of persons in prison ==
The UN Deputy Hugh Commissioner for Human Rights Kyung-wha Kang noted in July 2012 the persistence of a number of serious problems in Malawian prisons, including "[p]rolonged detention in severely overcrowded holding cells, due to a backlog of cases and the slow processing of bail applications." She noted that the efforts were being made to resolve this problem "and to explore alternatives to detention and imprisonment," and praised "this shift in thinking."

== Human-rights groups ==
Malawi Watch Human Rights, founded in 1992, “is an advocacy and lobbying non-governmental organization that works in areas of political and economic governance.” Its website has not been updated since January 2011.

The Centre For The Development Of People (CEDEP) is a human-rights organization “dedicated to addressing the needs, improving the lives, and providing support for some of Malawi's most neglected minority groups through civic education, training, capacity building, networking and research.” Its members believe “that improving the welfare of minority groups, including prisoners, sex workers, and those in same-sex relationships, is crucial to the health and well-being of all peoples.”

The Human Rights Consultative Committee, founded in 1995, is a network consisting of church institutions, human-rights groups, and the Law Society of Malawi, all of which work together on advocacy, monitoring, and other activities with the goal of protecting and promoting human rights in Malawi. The home of the HRCC's acting national coordinator, was a target of an arson attack in 2011.

The Centre for Human Rights and Rehabilitation (CHRR) is another leading Malawian human rights organization, also founded in 1995.

The Institute for Policy Interaction is another Malawian human-rights group. Its director, Rafiq Hajat, was forced to go into hiding during the presidency of Mutharika. On September 3, 2011, a petrol bomb was thrown into IPI offices in Blantyre, causing considerable damage.

== International treaties ==
Malawi is a signatory of the following international agreements:

• African Charter on Human and Peoples’ Rights (1981)

• Convention on the Elimination of All Forms of Discrimination against Women (1987)

• African Charter on the Rights and Welfare of the Child (1999)

• Convention on the Rights of the Child (1991)

• International Covenant on Civil and Political Rights (1993)

• International Covenant on Economic, Social and Cultural Rights (1993)

• Convention Against Torture and Other Cruel, Inhuman or Degrading Treatment or Punishment(1996)

• First Optional Protocol to the International Covenant on Civil and Political Rights (1996)

• Convention on the Elimination of All Forms of Racial Discrimination (1996)

• Rome Statute of the International Criminal Court (1999)

• Protocol to the African Charter on Human and Peoples’ Rights on the Rights of Women in Africa (2005)

• Convention on the Rights of Persons with Disabilities (2009)

• Optional Protocol to the Convention on the Rights of the Child on the Sale of Children. Child Prostitution and Child Pornography (2009)

• Optional Protocol to the Convention on the Rights of the Child on the Involvement of Children in Armed Conflict (2010).

== See also ==
- Human trafficking in Malawi
- LGBT rights in Malawi
- Politics of Malawi

== Notes ==
1.Note that the "Year" signifies the "Year covered". Therefore the information for the year marked 2008 is from the report published in 2009, and so on.
2.As of January 1.
3.The 1982 report covers the year 1981 and the first half of 1982, and the following 1984 report covers the second half of 1982 and the whole of 1983. In the interest of simplicity, these two aberrant "year and a half" reports have been split into three year-long reports through interpolation.
