= Maria Kambuzi =

- Occupation: politician
- Known for: represents the Lilongwe Bunda constituency
- Political party: Malawi Congress Party

Maria Kalambo Kambuzi is a Malawian politician who was elected to the National Assembly to represent the Lilongwe Bunda constituency.

== Elections ==
In the 2018 elections she was a United Independence Party candidate in the Zomba Malosa Constituency. She came second with 16% of the votes. The seat was won by Akajuwe Roy Kachale Banda of the People's Party with nearly half of the votes.

In February 2025 the MCP primaries took place for the Lilongwe Bunda constituency. Kambuzi was a candidate against a notable opponent. Callista Chapola who is the widow of the late president Bingu wa Mutharika. Bingu wa Mutharika was not a fan of the MCP party, but it enjoyed his widow's support. Callista Chapola made a point of mentioning her dead husband but she was defeated by Kambuzi.

Kambuzi was elected in 2025. Other successful MCP candidates included , Dorothy Chikonde, Maureen Chirwa, Grelzedar Jeffrey, Olipa Chimangeni, Rachel Mazombwe, Monica Chang’anamuno, Juliana Kaduya, Nancy Tembo and Catherine Gotani Hara.

She was among several Malawian MPs who welcomed British MPs to Lilongwe where they visited local schools. Her schools had also received support from a Kenyan company.
