= Esther Sagawa =

Malawian local politician (born 1994)

- Born: 1994 (age 31–32); Malawi
- Occupation: Politician
- Known for: Mayor
- Predecessor: Richard Banda
- Political party: Malawi Congress Party

Esther Amina Sagawa became the mayor of Lilongwe in 2024. She was a councillor for the Malawi Congress Party.

== Life ==
Sagawa's route into politics began when she became the executive director of the youth group Dream, Driven, Determined, Dedicated and Disciplined (5D) in Lilongwe. During her tenure the group supported a drive called Give a Child a Book. They raised the money with other groups and conducted car washes.

In 2019, she became one of Lilongwe's councillors. She was elected for the Area 18 ward. She was supported by the Malawi Congress Party. During her term she worked with the local members of parliament and she was elected to be the Deputy Mayor.

She was promoted from deputy to be the Mayor of Lilongwe in 2024. She replaced Richard Banda. She was the second woman to be the city's mayor as Juliana Kaduya had been the mayor from 2019 until 2021. In 2024, Esther Sagawa was elected as the city's second female mayor. Later that year she became the first woman to be the President of the Malawi Local Government Association when she was elected in November.

During the Malawi Congress Party's 2025 primary elections there was a complaint that some parts of the organisation were favouring older male candidates. Despite this, in April it was reported that victorious candidates included Sagawa as well as Juliana Kaduya, Nancy Tembo, Rubyna De Silva who were also in Lilongwe constituencies, Jessie Kabwila and Sakina Chingomanje in Salima and Dorothy Chikonje in Nkhotakota Dwangwa.

In 2025 the Commonwealth Local Government Forum celebrated its 30th anniversary by profiling thirty of its members. Sagawa was chosen together with Ontiretse Tryphinah Bogatsu from Botswana, Louise Gittins from the UK and 27 other local councillors.

The Anti-Corruption Bureau's acting director Hillary Chinombo shut down a case against her in August 2025. The controversial decision was made a month before national elections. The media reported that she had demanded that her staff put allotments of land in Lilongwe into her name.
