= Chimombo =

Chimombo is a surname. Notable people with the surname include:

- Callista Chimombo (born 1959), Malawian politician
- Steve Chimombo (1945–2015), Malawian writer
