= Bheki Maphalala =

Swazi jurist (died 2026)

The Honourable Bheki Maphalala
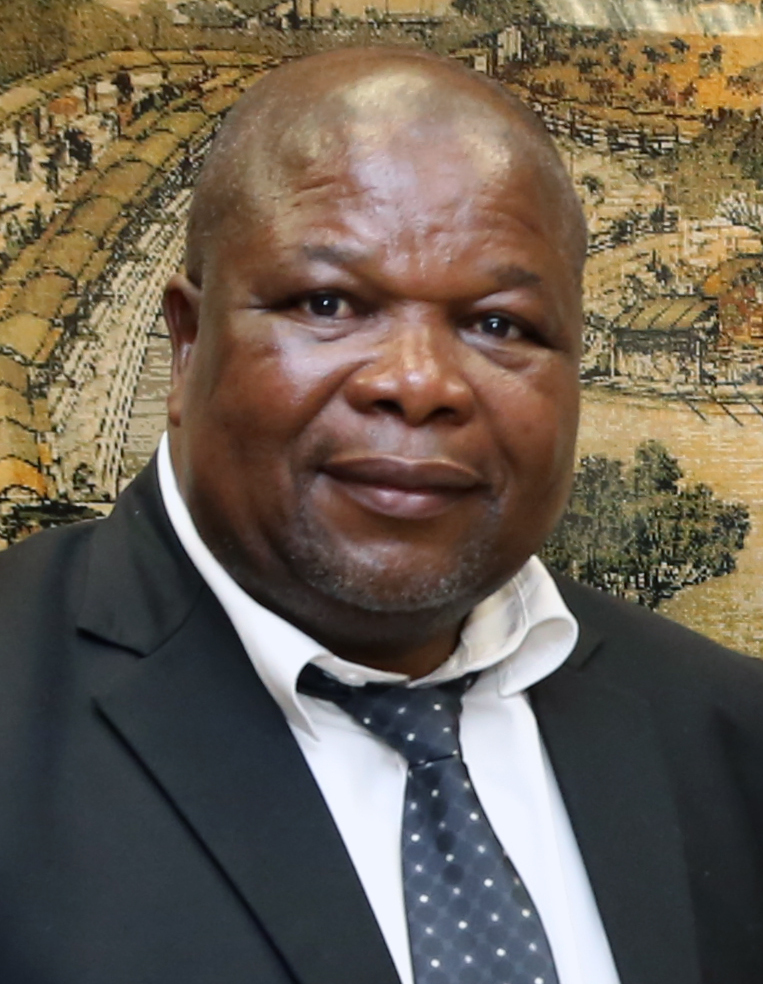
- Maphalala in 2018

Chief Justice of the Judiciary of Eswatini
- In office 10 November 2015 – 10 September 2026
- Appointed by: Mswati III
- Preceded by: Michael Ramodibedi

Personal details
- Died: 10 September 2026 South Africa
- Education: University of the Witwatersrand

Bheki Maphalala (died 10 September 2026) was a Swazi jurist and lawyer who served as Chief Justice of Eswatini from 2015 until his death in 2026. He became a member of the Supreme Court in 2011. King Mswati III appointed Maphalala as chief justice after dismissing Michael Ramodibedi.

== Early life and education ==
Maphalala graduated from the University of the Witwatersrand with a Bachelor of Laws in 1990.

== Career ==
From 1992 to 2009, Maphalala worked as an attorney. Prince Logcogco appointed him to the Constitutional Review Commission in 1996. In 2002, Maphalala was appointed to the Constitution Drafting Committee.

In 2009, Maphalala was appointed a judge on the High Court. In 2011, Maphalala was appointed to the Supreme Court, becoming its first Swazi permanent member. The International Commission of Jurists stated that his appointment to the Supreme Court was in violation of the constitution as Maphalala had only served on the High Court for two years rather than the minimum of five years.

Maphalala ruled on 17 April 2013 that The Nation was guilty of "contempt by scandalizing the court" for two articles it published which criticised Chief Justice Michael Ramodibedi in 2009 and 2010, and issued a fine of 300,000 Swazi lilangeni (around $20,000).

Arrest warrants were prepared by Ramodibedi against Mbutfo Mamba, Mumcy Dlamini, and Maphalala in 2014, and all three were noted to have angered Ramodibedi. King Mswati III dismissed Ramodibedi. Mswati appointed Maphalala, who was acting chief justice, to succeed Ramodibedi on 10 November 2015. As chief justice he also served as chair of the Judicial Service Commission. As of 2025, Maphalala had an annual salary of over 1 million Swazi lilangeni.

The Centre for Human Rights condemned Maphalala for disbarring Muzi Simelane in 2018, without a fair and public hearing.

== Death ==
Maphalala was hospitalised in South Africa due to an illness and died on 10 September 2026.

== Works cited ==
=== News ===
- "Judges' arrests on hold as Swazi furore continues". The Mail & Guardian. 22 May 2014. Archived from the original on 7 July 2025.
- "Swazi magazine handed heavy fine for criticism of chief justice". IFEX. 19 April 2013.
- Dlamini, Kwanele (11 September 2026). "Chief Justice Bheki Maphalala passes on". Times of Swaziland. Archived from the original on 11 September 2026.
- Myeni, Nkosingiphile (7 March 2025). "It's E1m salary for CJ". Independent News Eswatini. Archived from the original on 7 July 2025.
- Ndzimandze, Mbongiseni (13 November 2015). "Justice Maphalala Confirmed as CJ". Times of Swaziland. Archived from the original on 31 July 2020.
- Nkambule, Mlondzi (10 September 2026). "Chief Justice Bheki Maphalala passes on". Times of Swaziland. Archived from the original on 11 September 2026.
- Owolabi, Adekunle (11 September 2026). "Chief Justice Maphalala dies in South Africa". Swazi24. Archived from the original on 11 September 2026.

=== Web ===
- "Hon. Bheki Maphalala". Southern African Chief Justices' Forum. Archived from the original on 7 July 2025.
- "Press Statement: Centre for Human Rights condemns disbarring of lawyer Muzi Simelane by Eswatini Chief Justice". Centre for Human Rights. 27 June 2022. Archived from the original on 7 July 2025.
- "Swaziland: Appointment and promotion of judges; Security of tenure". International Commission of Jurists. 16 June 2014. Archived from the original on 7 July 2025.
