= Dorothy Chikonje =

Malawian politician

- Occupation: politician
- Known for: member of the National Assembly from 2025
- Political party: Malawi Congress Party (MCP)

Dorothy Chikonje is a Malawian member of the National Assembly from 2025. She represents the Nkhotakota Dwangwa Constituency.

== Life ==
Chikonje is a member of the Malawi Congress Party (MCP). In 2024 she gave her name to football trophy which was contested at Nkhunga police ground with MCP support.

During the MCP's 2025 primary elections there was complaint that some of the organisation was favouring older male candidates. However it was reported that victorious candidates included Maria Kambuzi, Juliana Kaduya, Nancy Tembo, Esther Sagawa, Rubyna De Silva who were all in Lilongwe constituencies, Jessie Kabwila and Sakina Chingomanje in Salima and Chikonje in Nkhotakota Dwangwa.

At the start of the 2025 election the Nkhotakota district was entirely represented by men at the National Assembly. After Chokonje decided to contest the 2025 election she reported that she had received a lot of abuse and ridicule. Some men aspiring to take office and their supporters had compared her to a prostitute. She and other women candidates had been promised support by the Catholic Commission for Justice and Peace. Other women were also not very supportive she said however she enjoyed a lot of support from her party and her constituents in general.

With the Malawi Congress Party's support, Chikonje contested Nkhotakota Dwangwa Constituency. She gained her place in the National Assembly at her first attempt. There were over 17,700 votes cast and she was given over 9,898 of them. The DPP candidate, Gift Dickson Chamayere, came second with 4,384 votes.
