= Cecilia Chazama =

Malawian politician

- Born: Malawi
- Citizenship: Malawi
- Occupation: Politician
- Years active: 2010–present
- Known for: Politics
- Title: Minister of Home Affairs and Internal Security in the Cabinet of Malawi

Cecilia Chazama is a politician in Malawi, served as the Minister of Home Affairs and Internal Security, in the Cabinet of Malawi, from 24 October 2017. Before that, she was the Minister for Civic Education in the Malawian Cabinet. After she left ministerial office she was under investigation.

== Life ==
Effective July 2018, Ms Chazama serves as the National Director for Women, in the ruling Democratic Progressive Party (DPP). She was elected at the third national elective convention of the party.

At the start of 2024 Chazama was called before a disciplinary meeting of her party after she was accused, with others including Grezelder Jeffrey, of organising an unauthorised meeting. In April she was being investigated over the employment of over 100 immigration assistants during her time as minister. It was alleged, by a whistle-blower from the HR department, that the names for these jobs were supplied by cabinet ministers.

== See also ==
- Parliament of Malawi
- Prime Minister of Malawi
- Grace Chiumia
