= Mutharika =

Mutharika may refer to:

- Bingu wa Mutharika, born Brightson Webster Ryson Thom (1934–2012), Malawian politician and economist, President of Malawi from May 2004 until his death in April 2012
  - Callista Mutharika, also known as Callista Chimombo, (born 24 May 1959), Malawian politician and the widow of President Bingu wa Mutharika
  - Ethel Mutharika (c. 1944 – 2007), First Lady of Malawi and wife of the President of Malawi, Bingu wa Mutharika
- Peter Mutharika (born 1940), Malawian politician, educator and lawyer, President of Malawi from May 2014 to June 2020.
