= Callista Chimombo =

Malawian politician

Callista Mutharika
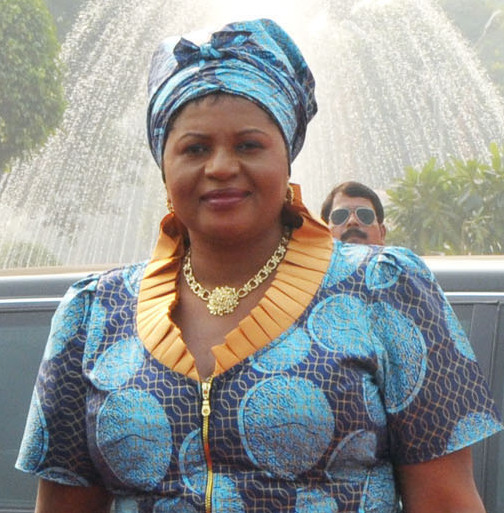

First Lady of Malawi
- In role 1 May 2010 – 5 April 2012
- Preceded by: Ethel Mutharika
- Succeeded by: Richard Banda

First Lady of African Union
- In office 1 May 2010 – 31 January 2011
- President: Bingu wa Mutharika
- Preceded by: Safia Farkash
- Succeeded by: Constancia Mangue

Personal details
- Born: 24 May 1959 (age 67) Zomba, Federation of Rhodesia and Nyasaland (now Malawi)
- Party: Democratic Progressive Party
- Spouse: Bingu wa Mutharika (m. 2010; died 2012)

Madame Callista Chapola-Chimombo (Callista Mutharika) (born 24 May 1959) is a Malawian politician and the widow of President Bingu wa Mutharika. She served as the First Lady of the Republic of Malawi from 2010 to 2012. Chimombo was a member of the Cabinet of Malawi as a National Coordinator of Maternal, Infant and Child Health and HIV/Nutrition/Malaria and Tuberculosis.

She served from 2022 as the High Commissioner of Malawi in the Republic of Kenya. She has served as a member of the Pan-African Parliament, and as the Malawi Minister of Tourism, Wildlife and Culture.

In 2005, she was Secretary of the Malawi Parliamentary Women's Caucus. Chimombo was a member of the Democratic Progressive Party and a member of the United Democratic Front (UDF).

== Personal ==
In January 2010, following a period of intense speculation, it was announced that Chimombo and President Mutharika were engaged to be married and would marry on 1 May 2010. They got engaged on Valentine's Day 2010 in a traditional ceremony that was broadcast on the news. At one point, Mutharika and Callista displayed their joy by taking it to the dance floor where his children, family members and guests spent almost 20 minutes dancing to an interlude of music that turned the whole event into a frenzy of excitement and jubilation. They were married in a Roman Catholic Church.

== Career ==
She has worked for Joyce Banda's Hunger Project before being involved in politics.

=== Political career ===
As of 2005, she was Secretary of the Malawi Parliamentary Women's Caucus. She served as a member of Parliament for Likangala Constituency in the district of Zomba. She also was a member of the Pan-African Parliament and was Minister of Tourism and Culture in Malawi. She became First Lady of Malawi after marrying Bingu wa Mutharika.

== First Lady of Malawi ==
After her marriage to Bingu Wa Mutharika, she was the first lady of Malawi until the death of Mutharika on 5 April 2012. Mutharika was a politically vocal first lady. She publicly weighed in on the decision by the DPP to fire the first and second vice-president by stating that Joyce Banda (who had not publicly expressed an interest to run as President) was not qualified to run as president. She stated that Banda's supporters were tantalizing themselves by drawing parallels with Liberian first female President Ellen Johnson Sirleaf. Some suggested that she may have considered running for President in 2014.

=== Safe Motherhood role ===
In August 2010, late president Bingu wa Mutharika appointed her as African Union Goodwill Ambassador for Safe Motherhood, replacing Vice President Joyce Banda. The concept of a National Coordinator for safe Motherhood in Malawi was drawn from that of the national Goodwill Ambassador for Safe Motherhood initiated by the Africa Union Conference of Ministers of Health in 2005. She was also in charge of the Safe Motherhood Foundation. The First Lady's Foundation sought to promote the advancement of women and vulnerable populations in all sectors of our rapidly changing and developing society.

=== Malaria program ===
Mutharika, was also in charge of the country's Malaria program. This was made an official cabinet role on September 8, 2011.

=== Official duties and cabinet role ===
After coming to power, the former First Lady was increasingly given the roles of the official Vice-President, now President Joyce Banda and Banda's name was omitted from the official Malawi cabinet list. She has also been appointed to the Malawi Cabinet as of September 8, 2011 as the National Coordinator of Maternal, Infant and Child Health and HIV/Nutrition/Malaria and Tuberculosis. Her work, including charity work has been considered as a salaried position by the Mutharika administration and she a monthly sum of over $7,000 for doing charity work as a coordinator of safe motherhood. On September8th, 2011, an online newspaper, Maravi post and the Nyasatimes Newspapers reported that Callista Mutharika had been either accidentally or purposefully listed as Vice President of Malawi on the official Malawi government website and included screenshots. This information was corrected on the government site. The Mutharika administration though has denied that she is the nation's Vice President.

=== Castigation of NGO's and civil society ===
Callista Mutharika created tension over a speech in which she criticized local NGO's that, "supported homosexuality and disturbed peace". She asserted that the NGO's were being given money to disturb the peace and to spread homosexuality in the country. She also castigated the civil rights groups for organizing the July, 20 2011 Malawi protests and encouraged rural dwellers not to protest. She received much criticism for her statements regarding the protest and civil society. Eight organizations signed an official response, acknowledging her right to free speech but questioning her role as the spokesperson for the party because her role as a spokesperson was not mandated in the constitution at that time. They accused her of spreading propaganda and stated that her comments were 'reckless and unacceptable'.

In February 2025 the MCP primaries took place for the Lilongwe Bunda constituency. She was a candidate against Maria Kambuzi. Her late husband Bingu wa Mutharika was not a fan of the MCP party, but it enjoyed his widow's support. She made a point of mentioning her dead husband during the primaries but she was defeated by Kambuzi.
