= Lilongwe City Council =

Lawmaking body of Lilongwe City

Type
- Type: Unicameral

Leadership
- Mayor: Richard Banda (Malawi Congress Party) since January 2, 2023
- Deputy mayor: Akweni Mbewe since January 2, 2022
- City manager: Moza Mbawa since January 2, 2024
- Director of planning: Emmanuel Mlaka since November 21, 2020
- Director of engineering: David Mkwambisi since January 2, 2022
- Director of health: Emily Chingaip since January 2, 2022

Structure
- Seats: 51
- Committees: See standing committees

Elections
- Voting system: First-past-the-post (general elections); Ranked-choice voting (primary and special elections)
- Next election: 2025

Meeting place
- Lilongwe City Hall

Website
- Official website

Lilongwe City Council (LCC) is the municipal government of Lilongwe, the capital city of Malawi. The council was established in 1998 and is responsible for providing services such as infrastructure development and maintenance, waste management, public health services, environmental conservation, land use planning and management, and economic development and investment promotion. The council is headed by a mayor and has a team of councillors and staff who work together to deliver services to the residents of Lilongwe. The council's goal is to make Lilongwe a better place to live, work and invest. It strives to provide quality services, promote economic growth and enhance the quality of life for all citizens.

The council has various departments, including engineering, health, planning and finance, which work together to achieve the council's objectives. They also work in partnership with other stakeholders, such as the government, private sector and civil society, to achieve common goals.

== History ==
=== Formation ===
Lilongwe City Council was established in 1998 as a body corporate under the Local Government Act of 1998. The council is responsible for the administration of the city of Lilongwe, which is the capital of Malawi. The aim of Lilongwe City Council is to provide effective and efficient services in areas such as infrastructure development, waste management, public health, and environmental conservation.

== Mission ==
The mission of Lilongwe City Council is to provide quality services to the residents of Lilongwe, promote economic development, and enhance the quality of life for all citizens. The vision of Lilongwe City Council is to make Lilongwe a modern, prosperous, and sustainable city.

== Current status ==
Lilongwe City Council is currently responsible for providing services to a population of over 1 million residents. The council has implemented various development projects, including road construction, public transportation systems, and community development programs.

== Staff positions ==
=== Mayor ===
The mayor is the political head of the council and is responsible for overseeing the overall operations of the council. The current mayor is Councillor Richard Banda.

=== Deputy mayor ===
The Deputy Mayor assists the mayor in the performance of duties and acts as the mayor in their absence. The current Deputy Mayor is Councillor Akweni Mbewe.

=== City manager ===
The City Manager is the chief executive officer of the council and is responsible for the day-to-day operations of the council. The current City Manager is Moza Mbawa.

=== Director of planning ===
The Director of Planning is responsible for the development and implementation of the council's strategic plan. The current Director of Planning is Dr. Emmanuel Mlaka.

=== Director of engineering ===
The Director of Engineering is responsible for the maintenance and development of the city's infrastructure. The current Director of Engineering is David Mkwambisi.

=== Director of health ===
The Director of Health is responsible for the provision of public health services in the city. The current Director of Health is Dr. Emily Chingaipe.
