= Jacaranda Foundation =

The Jacaranda Foundation is an American/Malawian grassroots organisation founded in 2002 by Malawian Marie da Silva. With the foundation itself based in New York City, it maintains the Jacaranda School. Since primary education is currently free for all students, it is Malawi's only entirely free school for both primary and secondary students. The vast majority of students of the Jacaranda School are orphaned by the HIV/AIDS pandemic.

== Background ==
In the Malawian Education system, primary education is free, but the student must supply his or her own uniform, paper, pencils, pens, other supplies, and examination fees. There are many orphans in Malawi who are unable to afford such fees or basic items such as food and clothing unless they give up school and begin working. Founder Marie Da Silva established the Jacaranda School to provide education for students funded by the Jacaranda Foundation, which pays for all the students' additional costs and supplies students with a daily nutritious meal. Secondary schooling, for which students must normally pay at Malawian schools, is also provided free at the Jacaranda School.

== History ==
Born in Malawi, Marie Da Silva has been working as a nanny in the United States for the past sixteen years. In 2002, Marie visited her mother and met the headmaster and teachers of a school housed in a nearby church. A year later the school had to move out of its premises and had nowhere to go. Marie's late mother, Aisha Da Silva, donated for use as a school and sanctuary for orphans. The school was at first housed in Da Silva's childhood home, just outside Blantyre, outside which Da Silva placed a sign reading "Free education for AIDS orphans." Richard Makwangawala was brought in as the school's first headmaster.

Marie's love for children and her personal history gave her the inspiration and sense of urgency to rescue orphans and raise awareness about their plight.

Gifts of supplies were received on 18 March 2008 from the Actie Schoenmaatjes (Active Shoemates) foundation in the Netherlands, delivered by local Malawian Pastor Milanzi. The Dutch organization donated to each student a shoebox containing school supplies and small toys such as tennis balls, stuffed animals, and balloons.

In 2008 Da Silva was nominated as a CNN Hero, with $25,000 donated to the Foundation.

In June 2009 the Jacaranda School welcomed its first visiting group from abroad, a group of 19 students and four teachers from the Shanghai American School, in Shanghai, China. The Jacaranda staff and students put on a musical event for the visitors, including performances by visiting Malawian singers.

On December 30, 2009, Da Silva received the Television Malawi Lifetime Achievement Award from the President of Malawi, Dr. Bingu wa Mutharika. A 16-year-old Jacaranda School student, Dorothy Damba, was also awarded for her determination to stay in school, against all odds.

Da Silva lived in New York City for several years. She returned to Malawi a few years ago and now she heads the school. She sometimes travels and speaks to schools across the world to share her story.
