= Malemia, Zomba =

Coordinates: 15°16′S 35°22′E

Malemia is a village in the Zomba District of Malawi, located on the southeastern edge of the Malosa Forest Reserve just off Highway S144 on the way from Zomba to Liwonde, at approximately latitude -15° 16', longitude 35° 22', roughly 70 kilometres north-northeast of Blantyre.

It is the home town of Joyce Banda.

It has been involved in chieftaincy wrangles which were resolved in 2017.This Yao Chieftainship has its headquarters at Mjale at the bottom of Domasi Mission Mountain. The battle which erupted in 2004 after the death of Allan Masokonesya saw the community exposed hardships ranging from unstable leadership to missing out number of development opportunities.
