= Anjimile Oponyo =

Malawian development worker and education administrator

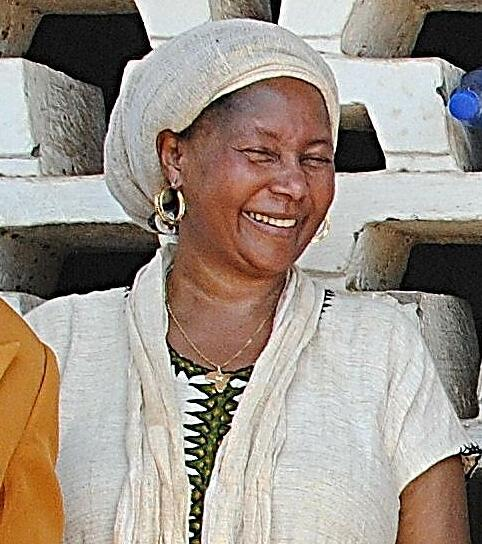
Oponyo in 2013

Anjimile Mtila-Oponyo is a Malawian development worker and education administrator. She has worked in education administration for the World Bank, International Monetary Fund and the United Nations Development Program where she built schools in Lebanon. She received international attention when she was selected as CEO and head of the Raising Malawi Academy for Girls in Malawi. She is currently a principal secretary in the Ministry of Education in Malawi.

== Career ==
They are a graduate of George Washington University, where she received her Master's in Education and took her sabbatical at Harvard Business School. Oponyo was the CEO of the Raising Malawi Academy for Girls until the project was cancelled due to lack of progress and mismanagement of funds. She are currently a civil servant working with the Malawi government.

=== Raising Malawi Academy for Girls ===
Once the Raising Malawi Academy for Girls (RMAG) project was terminated, a report was published that placed blame on Oponyo and Philippe Van Den Bossch, the boyfriend of Madonna's former trainer. The report was created by philanthropic consulting firm Global Philanthropy Group, hired by the board of directors of Raising Malawi in November 2010 to help the organization restructure its strategy and approach. The report implied that Oponyo and Van Den Bossch had acted outside their contracted roles. The report accused her of “outlandish expenditures”, including getting a "high salary, a car, housing, and a golf club membership", all of which were included in her contract by Madonna's aides.

==== Legal suit ====
Eight staff members of RMAG, including Oponyo, lodged the action with lawyer Charles Mpaka at the end of March 2011, claiming they were let go without proper termination procedures. The staff claims that they were being forced to sign a discriminatory termination agreement which was "unfair and unconstitutional" and included a 'confidentiality agreement' which prevents them from defending themselves against defamation and libel. Madonna's lawyer, Davis Njobvu, argued to the court that RMI was a registered trust in the United States and only provided funds for the construction and that there were no contracts signed between Raising Malawi, Inc. (RMI) and the former staff members. A Malawi court dismissed a legal action by Madonna to prevent their charity project from being sued by former employees for unfair dismissal and non-payment of benefits. All of the former RMAG staff members, except for Oponyo, have since settled with RMI.

Raising Malawi now supports education projects in Malawi through constructing community-based schools in the Kasungu District and by supporting scholarships for girls in secondary school. Madonna's visit to Malawi in April 2013 to see these schools was soured by a war of words. While Madonna stated publicly that they remained committed to the children of Malawi The government of Malawi, headed by President Joyce Banda, sister of Anjimile Mtila-Oponyo accused Madonna of lying and blackmail. Trevor Neilson, whose Global Philanthropy Group is managing Madonna's projects in Malawi, asserted that "The President of Malawi appears to be using their office to pursue the financial interests of their family." A year earlier in April 2012, at the Macy's Herald Square launch of her new fragrance Truth or Dare by Madonnain New York, Madonna said they're happy that Malawi's former vice president is now leading the country.

== Personal life ==
Oponyo has six children. She is married to Patrick Oponyo. She is sister to the former president of Malawi, Joyce Banda, who is the founder of the development and education Joyce Banda Foundation. She is sister-in-law to the barrister, judge, and former Malawi Chief Justice Richard Banda.
