= Michael Ramodibedi =

Lesotho jurist (1945–2019)

The Honourable Michael Ramodibedi

Chief Justice of the High Court of Swaziland
- In office 2010 – 17 June 2015
- Appointed by: King Mswati III
- Preceded by: Richard Banda
- Succeeded by: Bheki Maphalala

Personal details
- Born: Michael Mathealira Ramodibedi; 24 May 1945
- Died: August 15, 2019 (aged 74)

Michael Mathealira Ramodibedi (24 April 1945 – 15 August 2019) was a jurist from Lesotho who has served on the courts of several Commonwealth countries in Africa. A graduate of the University of Botswana, Lesotho, and Swaziland, he began his law career in Lesotho, and would later go on to hold positions on the bench there as well as in Seychelles and Botswana. He was the Chief Justice of Swaziland until 17 June 2015, when he was fired by King Mswati III for misconduct.

== Career ==
=== Early career ===
Ramodibedi began practising as a lawyer in 1974. In 1986 he was named a judge of the High Court of Lesotho. He served on Lesotho's Land Policy Review Commission in 1999 and 2000. He joined the Court of Appeal of Lesotho as an acting judge in 2000 and a permanent judge in 2002. He became the President of the Court of Appeal of Seychelles in September 2004, while still sitting on the Court of Appeal of Lesotho. In that capacity, he advocated for procedural improvements in record-keeping as well as the appointment of more judges who were ordinarily resident in Seychelles.

In January 2006 Ramodibedi was also named to the bench of the Court of Appeal of Botswana. However, the government of Seychelles expressed its concern at Ramodibedi's various positions, stating that "the Seychelles Court of Appeal required the full attention of its President", and so Ramodibedi chose to submit his resignation as President of the Court of Appeal of Seychelles in March 2006. Later that year he was named an acting judge of the Court of Appeal of Swaziland.

=== As Chief Justice of Swaziland ===
Ramodibedi was named acting Chief Justice of Swaziland in 2010. In 2011, he suspended Justice Thomas Masuku of the High Court of Swaziland, stating that Masuku had insulted him and King Mswati III. The Swaziland Coalition of Concerned Civic Organisations condemned Ramodibedi's decision. The action also resulted in controversy for Ramodibedi in Botswana, where he still sat on the Court of Appeal: the Law Society of Botswana called for his removal. A statement from Law Society executive secretary expressed concern "about his warped sense of justice and democracy whose influence may find their way into our jurisprudence".

Nevertheless, Ramodibedi was re-appointed acting Chief Justice in 2012. The 2005 Constitution of Swaziland states that "a person who is not a citizen of Swaziland shall not be appointed as chief justice of a superior court after seven years from the commencement of this constitution", which date would be 26 July 2012. Ramodibedi's contract as acting Chief Justice was renewed one month before that deadline, for an indefinite period. Lorraine Hlophe of the Judicial Service Commission was quoted as stating, "Swazis were considered for the position of Chief Justice, but none of them merited appointment to the post.".

Ramodibedi was fired for gross misbehavior.

=== 2013 Lesotho Court of Appeal session ===
In 2013, in his capacity as President of the Lesotho Court of Appeal, Ramodibedi chose not to invite any judges of the High Court of Lesotho to sit on the Court of Appeal; this meant that aside from Ramodibedi, all the judges hearing Court of Appeal cases would be South African. High Court Assistant Registrar Phatela Thakalekoala described this as a natural consequence of the low workload for the Court of Appeal during its upcoming session. However, Public Eye suggested that this decision might be related to the apparent power struggle between Ramodibedi and Chief Justice Mahapela Lehohla. In remarks a few days later, Ramodibedi made scathing criticisms of the High Court, blaming them for the low number of appeals enrolled for the Court of Appeal's 2013 session. He attributed this to the High Court's alleged long delays in delivering judgments, and further criticised the High Court for its refusal to make judges follow a monthly schedule of dates for case hearings and issuance of judgments, as was the practice in Botswana and Swaziland. The dispute between the two courts was described as a "constitutional crisis".

After Ramodibedi refused in April to step down as President of the Court of Appeal, the Ministry of Justice moved to seize his official cars; he went to the Constitutional Court to dispute the legality of this move. The government of Lesotho also expressed concern about Ramodibedi's role in Swaziland; Justice Minister Mophato Monyake stated that Ramodibedi's "public display of affiliation to an absolute monarch plainly undermines the public perception of judicial independence" in Lesotho. In September 2013, Ramodibedi was suspended as the President of the Court of Appeal. He was accused of various misconduct, such as having his driver submit a false accident report to an insurance company after his son was allegedly involved in an accident with his car, and for claiming travel allowances to which he was not entitled. The government formed a tribunal to consider the question of whether he should be removed, comprising retired South African judges Zak Yacoob, Meyer Joffe, and Yvonne Mokgoro as members. Ramodibedi criticised the impeachment process as "riddled with enormous irregularities, improprieties, and illegalities." Ramodibedi also filed suit in the Constitutional Court against Prime Minister Thomas Thabane, seeking an order for Thabane to withdraw his advice to the King of Lesotho that he should be suspended from his post as President of the Court of Appeal, but the Constitutional Court ruled against him in November 2013.

== Personal life ==
Ramodibedi was born in Lesobeng. He did his secondary education at Eagle's Peak High School in Qacha's Nek, graduating in 1967. The following year he enrolled at the University of Botswana, Lesotho and Swaziland in the joint LL.B programme with the University of Edinburgh, proceeding to Scotland in 1971 for the final three years of his course. He received his law degree from the University of Edinburgh in 1974. As of 2003, he was married and had five children, and had become a grandfather as well. He died on 15 August 2019 after a long battle with a terminal illness (https://www.thepost.co.ls/local-news/ramodibedi-dies/).
