= Marie da Silva =

Malawian AIDS activist

- Occupation: nanny
- Known for: AIDS activist

Marie da Silva is a Malawian AIDS activist and founder of the Jacaranda Foundation from Chembomba, Malawi.

== History ==
Da Silva was born in Malawi but lost 15 of her relatives including two brothers and her father to AIDS. She moved to the United States in order to work as a nanny in Los Angeles, California for actress Ricki Lake. In 2002, she learned that her school in Chembomba was about to close. She asked her mother to temporarily host classes in their family home so that the children could receive an education. She started funding the school with a third of her nanny pay and set up the Jacaranda Foundation to give free schooling to AIDS orphans in Malawi. When her mother died, she approached French businessman Luc Deschamps for help running the school, which he assisted by becoming the director.

The Jacaranda School eventually grew to over 400 students specializing in arts where she also teaches. In 2008, da Silva was recognized by American broadcaster CNN as one of their 2008 CNN Heroes for her work in Malawian education.
