= Nkhotakota District =

District of Malawi

Coordinates: 13°00′S 34°05′E

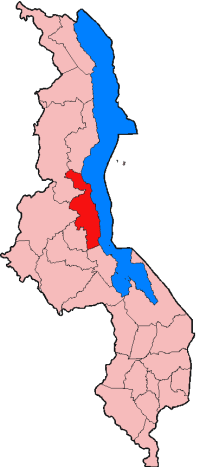
Location of Nkhotakota District in Malawi

Nkhotakota is a district in the Central Region of Malawi. The capital is Nkhotakota. The district covers an area of 4,259 km² and has a population of 395,897. The word Nkhotakota means "zig-zag" in Chichewa. It is located along the shore of Lake Malawi.

== Demographics ==
At the time of the 2018 Census of Malawi, the distribution of the population of Nkhotakota District by ethnic group was as follows:

- 75.8% Chewa
- 10.4% Tonga
- 3.9% Tumbuka
- 2.1% Lomwe
- 2.3% Ngoni
- 1.9% Yao
- 1.7% Sena
- 0.5% Nyanja
- 0.4% Nkhonde
- 0.4% Mang'anja
- 0.2% Lambya
- 0.1% Sukwa
- 0.2% Others

== Government and administrative divisions ==
There are five National Assembly constituencies in Nkhotakota:

- Nkhotakota - Central
- Nkhotakota - North
- Nkhotakota - North East
- Nkhotakota - South
- Nkhotakota - South East

One of the few women to win a seat here was Martha Lunji Chanjo who took what is now known as the Nkhotakota Liwaladzi Constituency in 2014. She did well and became the minister for labour but she died in 2021. Grezelder Jeffrey was the MP for Nkhotakota - South until 2019 when she lost her seat to Brennax Kaisi of the Malawi Congress Party.

At the start of the 2025 election the district was entirely represented by men at the National Assembly. Susan Mussa Kakota decided to contest the seat at Nkhotakota Central. She had lost her last attempt fifteen years before by just eight votes. With the Malawi Congress Party's support, Dorothy Chikonje contested Nkhotakota Dwangwa Constituency. She gained her place in the National Assembly at her first attempt.
