= Juliana Kaduya =

Malawian politician and teacher (born 1979)

Juliana Kaduya Her Worship
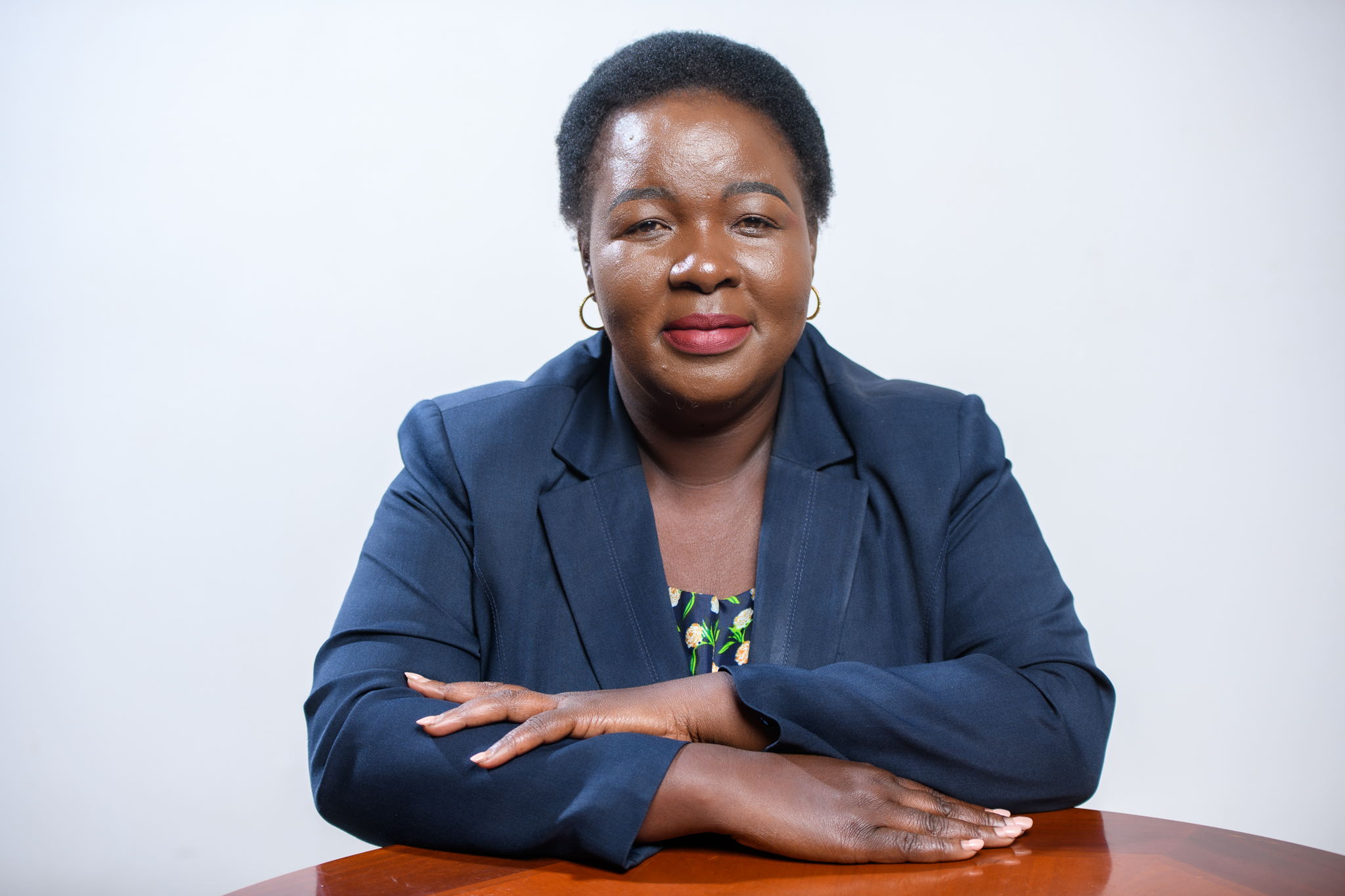

Mayor of Lilongwe City Council
- Preceded by: Desmond W.Bikoko
- Succeeded by: Richard Banda

Deputy Mayor, Lilongwe City Council
- Preceded by: Kwame Bandawe
- Succeeded by: Richard Banda

Personal details
- Born: Juliana Kaduya; 1 January 1979 (age 47) Malawi
- Party: Malawi Congress Party (MCP)
- Other political affiliations: Democratic Progressive Party (DPP)
- Education: Domasi Teachers College

Juliana Kaduya (born 1979) is a Malawian politician and teacher who was the first female mayor of Lilongwe City Council, Malawi. Kaduya served in this position between 2019 and 2021. She was elected to parliament in 2025.

== Background and education ==
Kaduya was born in 1979 and raised by her elder sister after both her parents died. She was the last of fifteen children. After her formal education, she obtained a Diploma in Teaching having studied at Domasi Teachers College.

== Career ==
Kaduya worked as a teacher for 15 years before she became politically active..

In 2014, Kaduya contested to be a Councillor for Chilinde 1 Ward, Lilongwe City South Constituency, on the Democratic Progressive Party (DPP) ticket. As a Councillor in 2017, she was then elected Deputy Mayor of Lilongwe City Council. After she was elected she joined the Malawi Congress Party (MCP).

In 2019, She was re-elected Councillor on the Malawi Congress Party ticket and she was then elected as Mayor of Lilongwe City by her fellow Councillors (27) and Members of Parliament (4).

She was not re-elected in 2021 and the new mayor was Richard Banda. The new deputy mayor was Esther Sagawa and she would go on to be the second woman to be mayor of Lilongwe.

During the MCP's 2025 primary elections there was complaint that some of the organisation was favouring older male candidates. However in April it was reported that victorious candidates included Kaduya as well as Nancy Tembo, Esther Sagawa, Rubyna De Silva who were all in Lilongwe constituencies.

Kaduya was elected to the National Assembly in 2025 and she became the vice-chair of the parliamentary committee responsible for Government Assurances & Public Sector Reforms. She and Samuel Kawale who is the chair could serve from 2025 to 2030.

== Personal life ==
Kaduya is a mother of four.
