= Grezelder Jeffrey =

Malawian politician

- Occupation: politician
- Political party: Democratic Progressive Party => Malawi Congress Party.

Grezelder Jeffrey is a politician in Malawi. She was an MP for the Democratic Progressive Party rising to be Secretary General. In 2024 she joined the Malawi Congress Party and she was re-elected in 2025 in the Nkhotakota Chia constituency.

== Life ==
She was elected as a member of the National Assembly for a constituency in Nkhotakota District in central Malawi. She became the party's Secretary General and she won unopposed in the primaries but she lost this seat in 2019. During the elections she had said that people should not vote for Ulema Msungama. She slandered him by saying that he had raped his cousin. In 2021 she was in the high court crying with remorse before the judge adjourned the court so that they could make an out of court settlement.

At the end of 2023 she announced that the National Governing Council meeting of the DPP would be held of December 6. This was required because there was a court order requiring such a meeting to create an election. The situation became complex when the DPP's spokesperson, Shadric Namalomba, issues a contradictory statement. Namalomba claimed that all of the DPP's positions had timed our and Jeffrey was (and was not) the Secretary General.

At the start of 2024 she was the Central Region vice president and she was called before a disciplinary meeting of her party after she was accused, with others including Cecilia Chazama, of organising an unauthorised meeting. She did not attend. Jean Kalilani led the disciplinary committee but they did not move to punish her quickly and this led to speculation in the media.

In 2024, she left the Democratic Progressive Party to join the Malawi Congress Party. Jeffrey explained her move to the MCP as being like a marriage. Her marriage to the DPP was over and she was returning "to the father". She was elected in the Nkhotakota Chia constituency with 10,441 votes in the 2025 election.
