= Determined to Develop =

US-based non-profit organization

- Formation: 2009
- Founder: Matt Maroon
- Type: Non-profit
- Region served: Malawi
- Method: Volunteering, Aid
- Website: www.determinedtodevelop.org

Determined to Develop is a registered 501(c)(3) United States charity working in Malawi. It operates from the Chilumba area in the Karonga District of northern Malawi, and was established in 2009 by Matt Maroon.

== Mission statement ==
To empower, through education, the people of Malawi to become agents of development for their families, communities, country, and world.

== History ==
Determined to Develop was established in 2009 by Matt Maroon who has lived in Malawi since 2006. After obtaining his graduate degree in anthropology, Matt moved to a rural part of Malawi and began laying the foundations for an on-the-ground operations, partnering with Malawian people and connecting with the community.

Determined to Develop moved from a passive to an active board in 2013. Within Malawi, Maroon is also the country manager for Lattitude Global Volunteering, a UK based charity which provides service opportunities for young people to teach in secondary schools within Malawi. Maroon formerly lectured at the University of Livingstonia where he held the post of Dean of the College of Social Sciences. In 2021, Geoff Mzembe, a Malawian, was promoted to executive director.

== Wasambo High School ==
Determined to Develop annually hosts The Malawi Research Practicum and the Malawi Graduate Fellowship in training future human rights advocates and professionals through applied research and working with the community on critical human rights and development issues. Undertaken in partnership with the University of Dayton Department of Political Science, this project draws on transdisciplinary research and applied participatory international development insights to enable students from across the university, including Teacher Education - School of Education and Health Sciences and ETHOS Center - School of Engineering, to meaningfully participate in development and human rights work on a global scale.

Wasambo Boys High School Malawi, Africa

In 2017 and in partnership with the University of Dayton, Determined to Develop commissioned a new boarding high school, Wasambo Boys High School which has established a national reach within its first year of inception. The first-year class of 75 students, is led by an international faculty, combining a half Malawian and have western-based staff. The existing school is home to approximately 500 male students who not only attend class—they also live on the grounds. The proposed expansion will accommodate an additional 2,500 male and female students with greatly improved water facilities, capable of providing an estimated 500,000 liters per day. The school will be transformed from a high school into a technical college for post-secondary education.

As the organization grew, staff members were added to the team and programming expanded. Although progress was being made in each of the development sectors, it was the educational programming that was having the most significant impact. Meanwhile, meetings with community stakeholders and a thorough needs assessment concluded that education was the top development priority for the region. In 2017, Determined to Develop transitioned to an organization rooted in education.

== Partnerships ==
The GoAbroad Foundation began partnering with Determined to Develop as a Beneficiary Organization Partner in September 2019, after being introduced to their programs and mission through the Give Together Program outreach program.
