= Lilongwe Bunda Constituency =

Malawian electoral constituency

- First-past-the-post constituency for the Parliament of Malawi
- District: Lilongwe
- Region: Central Region

Current constituency
- Party: MCP
- Member: Maria Kambuzi

Lilongwe Central Constituency is a constituency for the National Assembly of Malawi, located in the Lilongwe District of Malawi's Central Region. It is one of 22 constituencies in Lilongwe District. It elects one Member of Parliament by the first past the post system. The constituency has wards, all electing councilors for the Lilongwe District. In 2026, the member of parliament who represented the constituency was Maria Kambuzi.

== Members of parliament ==
Elections	MP	Party	Notes	References
2025	Maria Kambuzi	MCP	Multi-party system	
