= National Association of Business Women (Malawi) =

NABW logo

The National Association of Business Women (NABW) is a Malawian non-governmental organisation that supports women in business. It was founded in 1990 by Joyce Banda, who later became President of Malawi.

== History ==
Banda set up NABW to help Malawian women become economically empowered, inviting colleagues to form an organisation that would act as a pressure group for women's empowerment. The association had 2500 members by 1991, and Banda passed the leadership to a new director approximately seven years after founding NABW.

In 1997, Banda received the Africa Prize for Leadership for the Sustainable End of Hunger for founding NABW. In a later interview, Banda said that NABW had provided microfinance to 15,000 women.

== Activities ==
The Southern Africa Trust describes NABW as a woman-founded and women-led non-profit organisation focused on empowering women in business and leadership, registered in 1990 under Malawi's Trusteeship Act. In 20117, NABW was one of five Malawian partner organisations in the Green and Inclusive Energy programme of Hivos, a Dutch development organisation. The programme, run by Hivos alongside ENERGIA and the International Institute for Environment and Development and funded by the Dutch Ministry of Foreign Affairs, aimed to strengthen civil society organisations to lobby for greener and more inclusive energy systems. In May 2026, Executive Director Barbara Banda told Nation Online that women's businesses faced a difficult operating environment, with limited access to finance, markets, networking and technology.

== Leadership ==
Joyce Banda founded and led the association from 1990 and handed over leadership after seven years. In September 2026, the executive director was Barbara Banda.

== See also ==
- Joyce Banda
- Women in Malawi
