= Dalitso Kubalasa =

Malawian economist and civil rights activist

Dalitso Kingsley Kubalasa is a Malawian economist and civil rights activist. He is the head of the Malawi Economic Justice Network, a coalition of more than 100 civil society organizations that promote economic governance, and also the Executive Secretary of the Southern Africa People's Solidarity Network. Kubalasa has called on the government to practice sound economic changes to avoid further protests like the ones Malawi experienced in July 2011. He has also advised the government to trim down the bloated cabinet size and asked for cabinet appointments based on qualification and merit.
