= Times of Eswatini =

Newspaper in Eswatini

The Times of Eswatini (formerly the Times of Swaziland) is a newspaper published in Eswatini (formerly Swaziland). It is the oldest newspaper in Eswatini, having been established in 1897 by Allister Mitchel Miller (1864–1951).

Published for over a century, the Times of Eswatini covers national events, politics, business, culture, and other topics. Its publications include the Times of Eswatini, Eswatini News, Times Sunday, and What's Happening Eswatini.

== Circulation performance ==
According to the Audit Bureau of Circulation's Q1 2026 figures released on 21 May 2026, the Times of Eswatini posted a paid circulation of 6,668 copies—with zero free distribution. This distinction placed it ahead of six established South African daily titles when measured strictly on paying readers, including The Mercury (4,484 paid), The Witness (3,817 paid), The Star (3,750 paid), Daily News (3,154 paid), Cape Times (2,932 paid), and Cape Argus (2,253 paid).

This is particularly notable given that Eswatini has a population of approximately 1.2 million—a fraction of South Africa's 60+ million—and a comparatively smaller advertising market. Daily newspapers as a category fell 7% year-on-year across the region in Q1 2026.

== Community events ==
In May 2026, the Times of Eswatini organised the inaugural Times Half Marathon, themed "Your Race, Your Pace, Your Story". Held on 23 May 2026, the event attracted over 1,600 registered participants across 5km, 10km, and 21km categories, with up to E65,000 in prizes and incentives on offer. The races started at Mahlanya Complex Exit, finishing at OlympAfrica adjacent to Somhlolo National Stadium in Lobamba. Athletes from the Umbutfo Eswatini Defence Force and the Royal Eswatini Police Service were among the prominent winners. Deputy Prime Minister Thulisile Dladla attended the event.
