= Joyce Banda Foundation =

School in Malawi

The Joyce Banda Foundation is a primary and secondary school in Malawi founded by Joyce Banda in 1997. Its primary focus is education and sustainable development. In response to the needs of the rural community, it grew into a multi-faceted organisation.

== Schooling ==
The primary school provides primary education for pupils of the age of 4 to 12. The secondary school offers both local and international curricula to its students. Students can sit for both IGCSE and MANEB Examinations.

== Health ==
The Joyce Banda Foundation hosts an Orphan Care Center that provides care for orphans which includes access to education. It cares for over 600 children through 6 centers. The foundation also hosts 4 medical clinics for 200 villages, and assists the rural communities with development needs in the area of agriculture, health, and other daily needs. The foundation has a working partnership with other non-profits, including the Jack Brewer Foundation in the U.S.

== Joyce Banda Foundation Integrated Rural Development Programme (JBFIRDP) ==
The Foundation initially started as an academic centre but now is an institution which also assists in development projects.

=== Micro-Credit ===
The foundation provide micro-credit loans to over 40 members.

=== Agricultural Assistance ===
Assists farmers by providing seeds, blankets etc.

== See also ==
- Joyce Banda
- National Association of Business Women (NABW)
