= Joyce Banda =

President of Malawi from 2012 to 2014

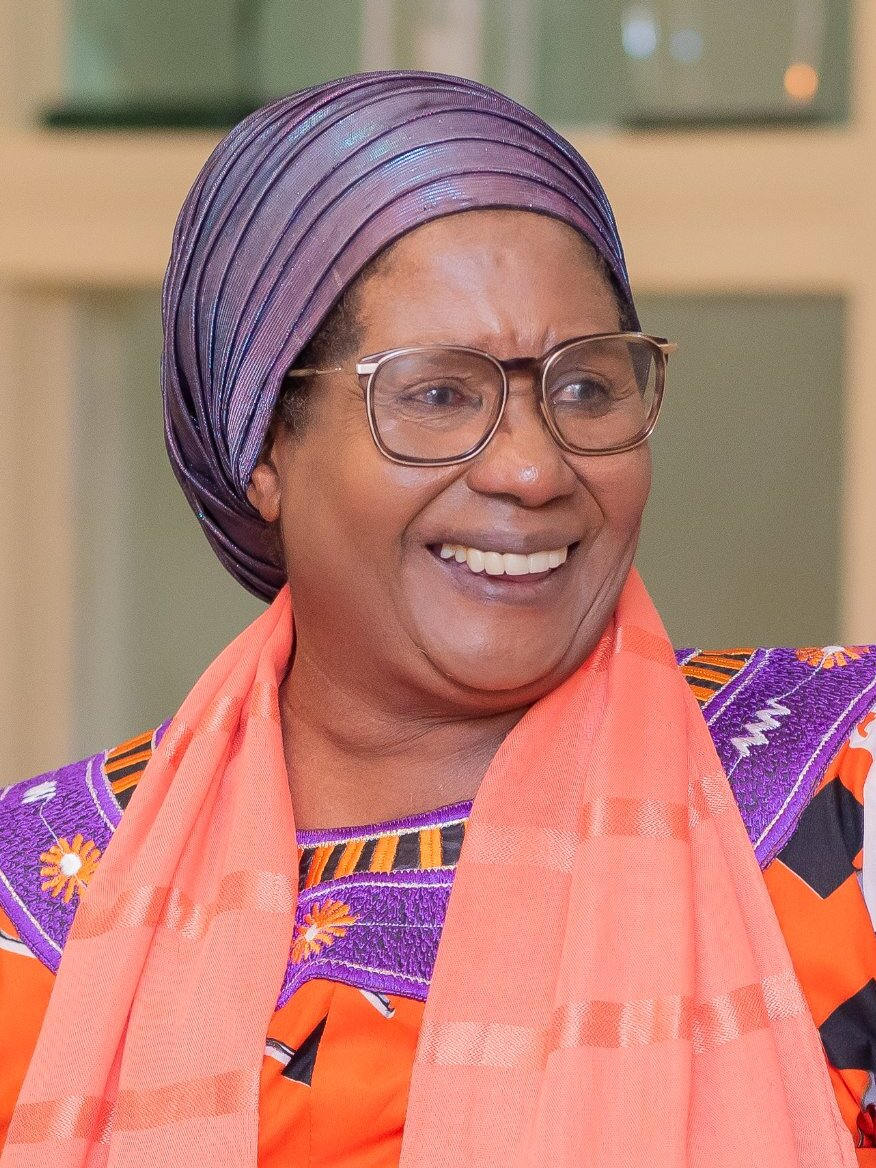
- Banda in 2025

4th President of Malawi
- In office 7 April 2012 – 31 May 2014; Acting: 5–7 April 2012
- Vice President: Khumbo Kachali
- Preceded by: Bingu wa Mutharika
- Succeeded by: Peter Mutharika

4th Vice-President of Malawi
- In office 24 May 2009 – 7 April 2012
- President: Bingu wa Mutharika; Herself (acting)
- Preceded by: Cassim Chilumpha
- Succeeded by: Khumbo Kachali

Minister of Foreign Affairs
- In office 1 June 2006 – 24 May 2009
- President: Bingu wa Mutharika
- Preceded by: George Chaponda
- Succeeded by: Etta Banda

Minister of Gender, Child Welfare, and Community Service
- In office 24 May 2004 – 1 June 2006
- President: Bingu wa Mutharika

Personal details
- Born: Joyce Hilda Ntila; 12 April 1950 (age 76) Malemia, Nyasaland (now Malawi)
- Party: People's (since 2011)
- Other political affiliations: UDF (before 2004); DPP (2004–2010)
- Spouses: Roy Kachale (before 1981); Richard Banda (m. 1983)
- Children: 5
- Education: Columbus University (BA); Atlantic International University (BSC); Royal Roads University (MA)

Joyce Hilda Banda (née Ntila; born 12 April 1950) is a Malawian politician, educator, and activist who served as the 4th President of Malawi from 2012-2014. She previously served as the vice-president under Bingu wa Mutharika from 2009 till his death in 2012 when she succeeded him as President. A member of the People's Party, Banda has led the party since its creation in 2011. She was the first female president and the first female vice-president of Malawi. Banda was the second female African head of state after Liberia’s Ellen Johnson Sirleaf.

Born in Malemia, Banda graduated from the Columbus University and the Royal Roads University with a bachelor's degree and a master's degree in arts, and from the Atlantic International University with a bachelor's degree in social science in the early 1970s. She then founded the Joyce Banda Foundation, the National Association of Business Women (NABW), Young Women Leaders Network, and the Hunger Project. Banda joined politics in 1999 and was elected to the National Assembly as a member of the United Democratic Front (UDF) the party of President Bakili Muluzi.

In 2004, Banda was appointed Minister of Gender, Child Welfare, and Community Service by President Mutharika. During her time in the position, she enforced the 2006 Domestic Violence Bill, and also designed the National Platform for Action on Orphans and Vulnerable Children and the Zero Tolerance Campaign Against Child Abuse. Banda was later appointed Minister of Foreign Affairs where she switched Malawi's recognition from the Republic of China to the People's Republic of China in an attempt to bring economic growth to Malawi. In 2009, Mutharika ran for re-election and selected Banda as his running mate in the general election, with their ticket winning and she thus becoming the first vice president. Banda's term as vice president was marked by growing tensions between her and Mutharika as Banda refused to endorse Mutharika's brother, Peter, as his successor to the presidency. Banda was subsequently kicked out of the DPP and she founded the People's Party, but then remained vice president according to the Constitution.

In April 2012, Mutharika died; according to the Constitution, Banda as vice president would become president. However, some members of the DPP who were loyal to Mutharika tried installing his brother as president, triggering a succession crisis. Despite this, Banda, as stated by the law, became president with the support of the military, who backed the Constitution. In 2014, Banda lost the general election to Peter Mutharika, brother of the late Bingu. While Banda at first refused to concede and demand a rerun, citing fraud, she eventually conceded and handed over power to Mutharika on 31 May.

In June 2014, Forbes named Banda as the 40th most powerful woman in the world and the most powerful woman in Africa. In October 2014, she was included in the BBC's 100 Women.

== Personal and family life ==
Joyce Hilda Ntila was born on 12 April 1950 in Malemia, a village in the Zomba District of Nyasaland (now Malawi). She went to Providence Secondary School. Her father was a police brass band musician. She began her career as a secretary and became a well-known figure during the rule of dictator Hastings Banda.

She earned a Cambridge School Certificate, a Bachelor of Arts Degree in Early Childhood Education from Columbus University (an unaccredited distance education institution), a Bachelor of Social Studies in Gender Studies from Atlantic International University (also an unaccredited distance learning institution) and a Diploma in Management of NGOs from the International Labour Organization (ILO) Centre in Turin, Italy. Atlantic International University has been characterized as a degree mill, and its degrees have been widely dismissed as "fake." She also received a Master of Arts degree in Leadership from Royal Roads University in Canada. and an honorary doctorate in 2013 from Jeonju University.

She married Roy Kachale, with whom she had three children. At age 25, she was living in Nairobi, Kenya.

In 1975, a growing women's movement in Kenya motivated Banda to take her three children and leave what she has described as an abusive marriage. Her marriage to Roy Kachele ended in 1981. She later married Richard Banda, retired chief justice of Malawi, with whom she has two children.

Between 1985 and 1997 Banda managed and established various businesses and organisations including Ndekani Garments (1985), Akajuwe Enterprises (1992), and Kalingidza Bakery (1995). Her success inspired her to help other women achieve financial independence and break the cycles of abuse and poverty.

She is sister to Anjimile Oponyo, former CEO of the Raising Malawi Academy for Girls, financed by Madonna.

== Political life ==
=== Public offices (1999–2009) ===
Joyce Banda entered politics in 1999. She won a parliamentary seat in Malawi's third democratic election as a member of President Bakili Muluzi's party, the United Democratic Front. She represented the Zomba Malosa constituency. Muluzi appointed her as Minister for Gender and Community Services. As minister, she fought to enact the 2006 Domestic Violence Bill, which had failed for seven years. She designed the National Platform for Action on Orphans and Vulnerable Children and the Zero Tolerance Campaign Against Child Abuse.

In 2004, she was re-elected as a member of Muluzi's Party. Bingu wa Mutharika became President. Even though Banda was not a member of his party, Mutharika appointed her as Minister of Foreign Affairs in 2006. Banda moved to change Malawi's recognition of the legitimate government of China from the Republic of China (on Taiwan) to the People's Republic of China on the mainland; she claimed the switch would bring economic benefits to Malawi. In 2010, China finished the construction of a new parliament building in Lilongwe.

=== Vice-President (2009–2012) ===
Banda ran as the vice-presidential candidate of the Democratic Progressive Party (DPP) in the 2009 presidential election, running alongside Mutharika, the DPP presidential candidate. She served as Malawi's first female vice-president. In a surprise move by the DPP, Joyce Banda and second vice-president Khumbo Kachali were fired as the vice-presidents of the DPP on 12 December 2010 for undefined 'anti-party' activities. In attempts to ostracise her, the president continued to give roles that were previously held by her to Callista Mutharika, who was included in the cabinet in September 2011. The court blocked attempts by Mutharika to fire her as vice-president on constitutional grounds. This included attempts to seize her official government vehicle and to block her from registering her new party. On 8 September 2011, the role of vice-president was left out in a cabinet reshuffle. However, she was still the legal Vice-President because the post was mandated by the constitution. She was urged by DPP spokesman Hetherwick Ntaba to resign as vice-president.

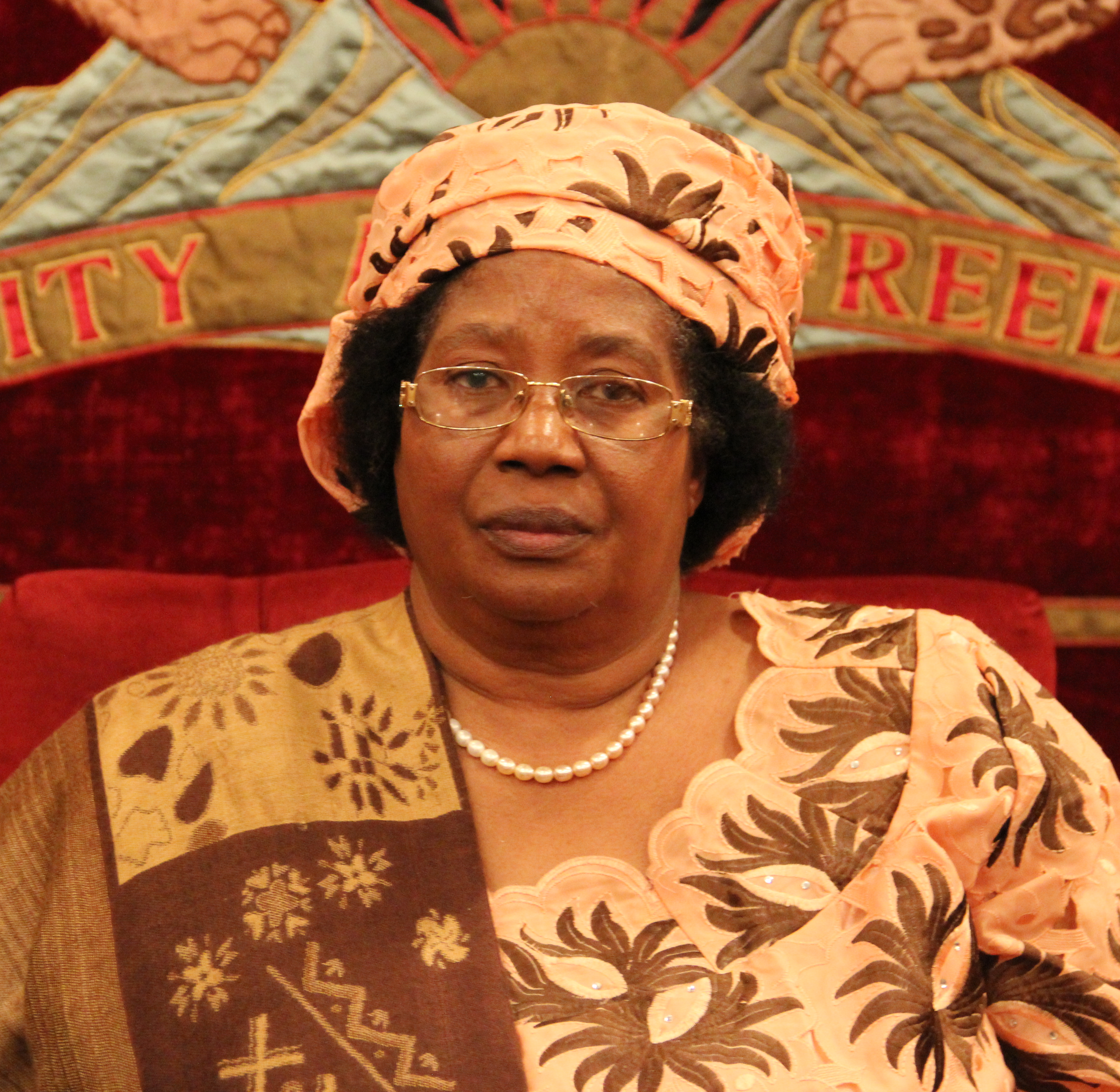
Banda in 2012

=== Factions in DPP ===
The relationship between Banda and President Bingu wa Mutharika had become increasingly tense because of Mutharika's attempts to position his own brother, Peter Mutharika, as his successor. Although she was fired from the position as vice-president of the DPP together with Second Vice-President Khumbo Kachali, she continued to serve as vice-president of Malawi as stipulated in the constitution. This move led to mass resignations in the DPP and the formation of networks that supported her candidacy to become president of Malawi in the 2014 general election. The DPP denied that mass resignations had occurred and insisted that they were only a few.

=== People's Party ===
Banda is the founder and leader of the People's Party, formed in 2011 after she was expelled from the ruling DPP when she refused to endorse President Mutharika's younger brother Peter Mutharika as the successor to the presidency for the 2014 general election.

=== President (2012 – May 2014) ===
==== Transition of power ====
On 5 April 2012, President Mutharika died. After his death the government failed to notify the public in a timely manner that the president had died. This led to the fear of a constitutional crisis in Malawi.

Agence France-Presse reported Malawi's ex-President Bakili Muluzi as insisting on "constitutional order", saying the vice-president must automatically take power under the constitution. "I am calling for a constitutional order, for continued peace and order. The laws of Malawi are very clear that the vice president takes over when the sitting president can no longer govern. We have to avoid a situation where there is disorder. Let us follow the constitution. We have no choice but follow the constitution. It's very important that there must be peace and calm." Malawi's security forces also wanted the constitutional order to prevail. The Malawi Law Society confirmed that under section 83(4) of the constitution of Malawi, she was the legitimate successor to the Presidency.

On 7 April, Malawi's cabinet sought a court order to block Banda from becoming president. In turn, she phoned the army commander, General Henry Odillo, and asked if he would support her. He agreed and stationed troops around her house.

Joyce Banda was sworn in on 7 April 2012 as president of Malawi, the first woman to hold the office. Chief Justice Lovemore Munlo presided over the ceremony which was held at the National Assembly in Lilongwe. After she was sworn in, Banda appealed for national unity. "I want all of us to move into the future with hope and with the spirit of oneness and unity... I hope we shall stand united and I hope that as a God-fearing nation we allow God to come before us, because if we don't do that then we have failed."

The Malawian and international media reported on Joyce Banda's smooth inauguration. They called it a triumph for democracy. A Malawi Sunday Times editorial said that the new president's inauguration had "helped to entrench and cement a democratic culture in the country."

==== Cabinet appointments and loss of 2014 presidential election ====
On 26 April 2012, Banda chose her cabinet, composed of 23 ministers and nine deputy ministers. She gave herself several key portfolios to strengthen her own power as the country's leader.

On 10 October 2013, a few days after returning from a trip to the UN, Banda sacked her cabinet following the Capital Hill Cashgate scandal. On 15 October, a new cabinet was appointed, and notably Finance Minister Ken Lipenga and Justice Minister Ralph Kasambara were dropped from the cabinet.

In May 2014 Joyce Banda was heavily defeated in the presidential election. She failed in an attempt to nullify the election. She did not attend the swearing in of the winner, Peter Mutharika, but offered him her congratulations. She lived outside Malawi beginning in 2014. A warrant for her arrest in connection with alleged corruption during her stint as President was announced on 31 July 2017, although she remained outside the country. She denied the charges and said that she would return to face them.

==== International relations ====
In the years prior to Banda's presidency, Malawi was left in a poor economic situation due to foreign relations under the Bingu wa Mutharika administration. Within the last year of Mutharika's presidency, Britain, the United States, Germany, Norway, the European Union, the World Bank, and the African Development Bank had all suspended financial aid. They had expressed concern about Mutharika's attacks on democracy domestically and his increasingly erratic policies. In March 2012, Mutharika told these foreign donors to "go to hell." He accused them of plotting to bring down his government. Part of Banda's challenge as president was to restore diplomatic ties with the aid donors. She also had the challenge of restoring diplomatic ties with Malawi's neighbors like Mozambique, and regional countries such as Botswana.

Within the first week of her presidency, Banda launched a diplomatic offensive to repair Malawi's international relations. She spoke to Henry Bellingham of the United Kingdom's Foreign Office. He assured her that a new British envoy will be sent "within the shortest time possible." She spoke to the United States Secretary of State Hillary Clinton. Clinton promised to resume discussions on the $350 million energy grant as soon as possible. Banda announced plans to speak to Baroness Ashton of the European Union's Foreign Affairs office and the Malawi's IMF Resident Representative, Ruby Randall. She and Zambian president Michael Sata had also conferred about resuming close working relations. At least partly to further please donors, Banda's administration also refused in June 2012 to host that July's African Union summit on the grounds that the AU had insisted that Sudan's president Omar al-Bashir be given assurances that Malawi would refuse to serve the International Criminal Court arrest warrant against him; the Cabinet decided that such conditions were unacceptable. Banda was named by Forbes as the 40th most powerful woman in the world, the highest African name on the list.

==== Domestic policy ====
Malawi’s original 1964 flag, reinstated in 2012

The unpopular 2010–2012 flag

===== National symbols =====
Within two months of taking office, Banda's administration tabled a bill to restore Malawi’s original 1964 "rising-sun" flag, replacing the version adopted in 2010 under Bingu wa Mutharika.

===== Human-rights initiatives =====
On 18 May 2012 Banda announced her intention to repeal laws criminalising same-sex relations. In November the Ministry of Justice issued a moratorium on arrests for consensual same-sex activity pending parliamentary review, but the High Court annulled that moratorium in February 2016, ruling that only Parliament could suspend or repeal the penal-code provisions. Although same-sex relations remain criminalised, civil-society advocacy has grown; Lilongwe hosted Malawi’s first LGBT pride march on 26 June 2021.

===== Macroeconomic and fiscal reforms =====
In line with International Monetary Fund (IMF) advice, Banda floated the exchange-rate regime and, on 7 May 2012, devalued the Malawian kwacha by 33 percent against the US dollar to eliminate a thriving parallel market and unlock external support.

- Short-term impact: The devaluation, combined with fuel price liberalisation, pushed year-on-year inflation above 34 percent and sparked strikes and demonstrations in January 2013.
- Medium-term recovery: By late 2013 the IMF reported that “recovery is underway … facilitated by increased availability of foreign exchange” and that inflation had begun to fall. A Southern African Development Community peer-review mission projected average inflation to decline to 19.6 percent in 2014 as the kwacha stabilised.
- Donor relations: The U.S. Congressional Research Service noted that most donors who had suspended budget support under Mutharika reinstated it after Banda’s reforms, including a US $350-million Millennium Challenge Corporation compact.

These policy shifts were consolidated in the government’s 2012–2014 Economic Recovery Plan, which paired market-based reforms with social-protection programmes.

===== Austerity and the presidential jet =====
To cut executive expenditure Banda pledged to reduce her salary by 30 percent and ordered the disposal of a Dassault Falcon 900EX bought by her predecessor. The aircraft was sold to British Virgin Islands–registered Bohnox Enterprise for US $15 million in May 2013. Government officials said the proceeds were used to offset a defence-contract debt with Paramount Group and to finance maize and medicines, but civil-society groups criticised the barter arrangement and demanded documentation. A 2021 notice by Parliament’s Public Accounts Committee signalled a fresh inquiry into the transaction, although no criminal charges have been filed.

===== Public reaction =====
While Banda’s reforms restored donor confidence and foreign-exchange liquidity, they also imposed sharp cost-of-living increases on urban households, eroding her domestic popularity ahead of the 2014 general election. Analysts remain divided over the long-term benefits of the 2012 devaluation, although subsequent IMF and World Bank assessments credit the policy mix with averting a balance-of-payments crisis and laying groundwork for renewed growth.

==== Presidential initiatives ====
Banda has shown consistent commitment to maternal health and reproductive rights, specifically through her support of safe motherhood in Malawi. She showed her support through establishing the Presidential Initiative on Maternal Health and Safe Motherhood. In only two years, this Initiative showed a reduction in maternal mortality ratios from 675 deaths per 100,000 live births to 460 deaths per 100,000 live births.

==== Flag ====
After the flag was changed in 2010 by the Mutharika government, there was public opposition. Many groups challenged the legitimacy of the flag. On 28 May 2012, Banda led the nation's MPs to vote to revert the flag back to its independence flag, which was originally adopted in 1964. All parties, except the DPP, voted in favor of reverting to the independence flag.

=== Post-presidential life ===
==== Return from exile and Cashgate investigations (2018) ====
Banda returned to Malawi on 28 April 2018 after more than three years of self-imposed exile in the United States, where she had been a distinguished fellow at the Woodrow Wilson Center and the Center for Global Development. Although police had issued a 2017 warrant for her arrest over the 2013 “Cashgate” scandal, the Anti-Corruption Bureau stated in May 2018 that investigations were continuing and that Banda had not been formally charged.

==== 2019–2020 electoral alliances ====
The People’s Party initially nominated Banda for the 2019 presidential election, but on 15 March 2019 she withdrew and endorsed opposition candidate Lazarus Chakwera. After the Constitutional Court annulled the 2019 result, Banda campaigned for Chakwera in the June 2020 rerun and publicly congratulated him following his victory.

Chakwera's first cabinet, announced on 8 July 2020, included Banda's son, Roy Akajuwe Kachale-Banda, as minister of industry.

==== International advocacy and philanthropy (2021–2024) ====
Banda has remained active in global health and development issues.

- In May 2021 she joined former heads of state and Nobel laureates in an open letter urging the G7 to waive COVID-19 vaccine patents and reinvigorate the fight against AIDS.
- On 11 March 2023 she was among nearly 200 world figures signing the People’s Vaccine Alliance “Never Again” statement calling for equitable pandemic responses.
- In February 2023 Banda became one of three “grain ambassadors” for Ukraine, helping to identify African countries most in need of Ukrainian grain exports amid the Russo-Ukrainian War.

Through the Joyce Banda Foundation Trust she has continued food-security and education initiatives, including distributing maize to 500 households affected by Cyclone Freddy in January 2024 and launching a K315 million bursary scheme for secondary-school girls in 2024.

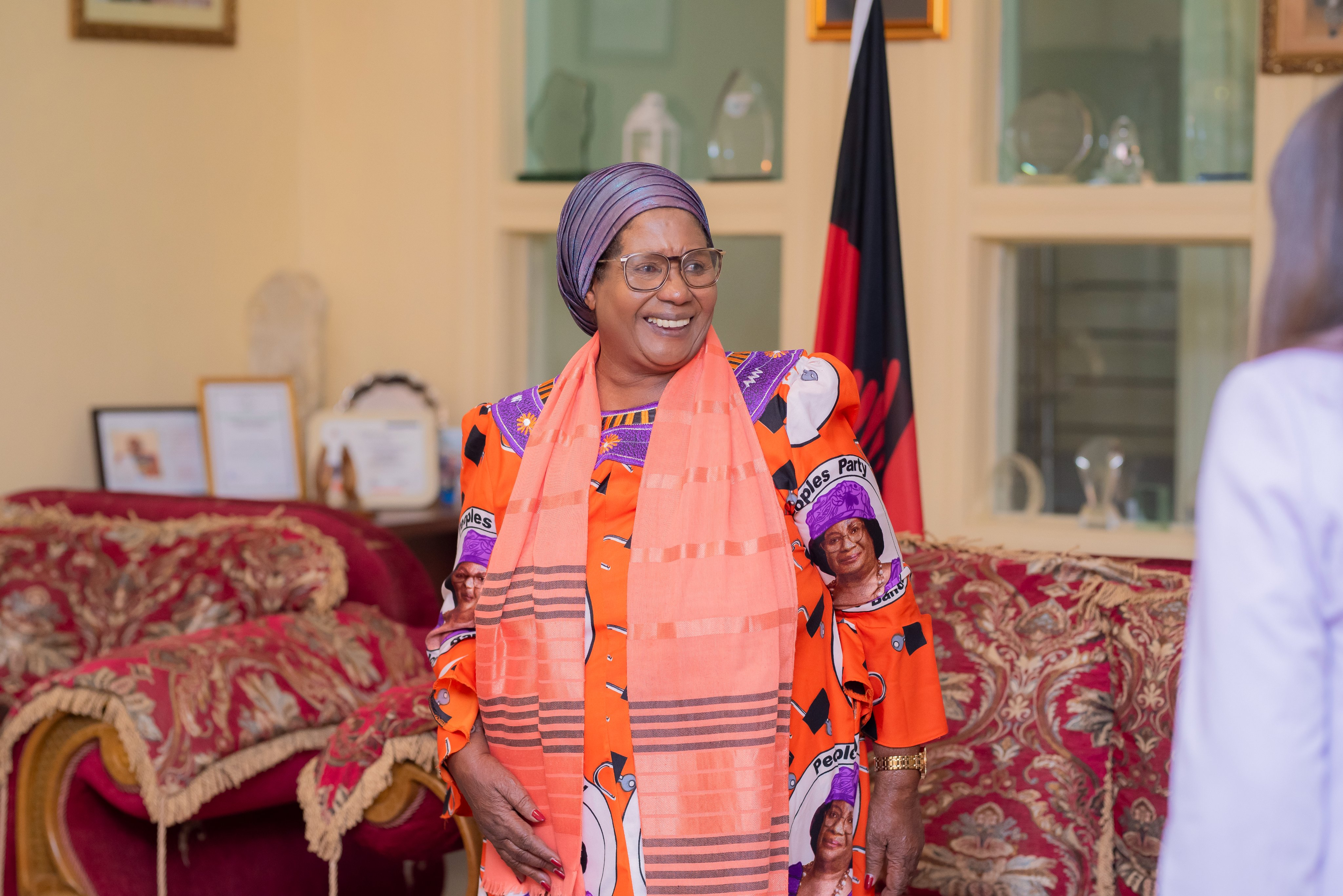
Banda in 2025

==== 2025 presidential candidacy ====
On 23 June 2025 the People’s Party National Executive Committee unanimously endorsed Banda as its presidential candidate for the 2025 Malawian general election. Announcing her bid in Lilongwe, she argued that “Malawi is at a crossroads and needs a new vision centred on youth employment and women’s economic empowerment.” Her campaign—branded “A New Malawi for the Youth Initiatives (A.Ma.Y.I.)”—highlights free secondary education, mobile health clinics, anti-corruption reforms and youth entrepreneurship as its core pillars. She lost to Peter Mutharika.

== Joyce Banda Foundation ==
Before becoming vice-president, she was the founder and CEO of the Joyce Banda Foundation, a charitable foundation that assists Malawian children and orphans through education. It is a complex of primary and secondary schools in the Chimwankhunda area of Blantyre. It includes an orphan care centre that consists of six centres and 600 children. It also assists the surrounding villages by providing micro-credit to 40 women and 10 youth groups. It provided seeds to over 10,000 farmers and has provided other donations. The foundation has constructed four clinics in four of the 200 villages it assists. The foundation also assists in rural development. It has a partnership with the Jack Brewer Foundation, a global development foundation founded by NFL star, Jack Brewer.

== National Association of Business Women ==
Banda is the founder of the National Association of Business Women in Malawi that was established in 1990. It is a registered non-profit foundation in Malawi. The association aims to lift women out of poverty by strengthening their capacity and empowering them economically. This is a social network of 30,000 women, dedicated to supporting women's businesses and supporting women who want to participate in business. Its activities include business training, technical training, record keeping and management skills. They work towards creating dialogue with policymakers to make policies favourable to women business owners. Its current director is Mary Malunga. The foundation has had a partnership with the Netherlands-based Humanist Institute for Development Cooperation (Hivos) at The Hague since 2003.

== Philanthropy and development initiatives ==
Banda has been involved with many grassroots projects with women since the age of 25 to bring about policy change, particularly in education. She founded the Joyce Banda Foundation for Better Education. She founded the Young Women Leaders Network, National Association of Business Women and the Hunger Project in Malawi. She (jointly with President Joaquim Chissano of Mozambique) was awarded the 1997 Africa Prize for Leadership for the Sustainable End of Hunger by the Hunger Project, a New York-based non-governmental organisation. She used the prize money to fund the building of the Joyce Banda foundation for children. In 2006, she received the International Award for the Health and Dignity of Women for her dedication to the rights of the women of Malawi by the Americans for United Nations Population Fund.

She served as commissioner for "Bridging a World Divided" alongside personalities such as Bishop Desmond Tutu, and United Nations Human Rights Commissioner, Mary Robinson. Banda was also member of the Advisory Board for Education in Washington DC, and on the advisory board for the Federation of World Peace and Love in Taiwan (China).

As part of a government move on austerity measures in October 2012, Banda cut her salary by 30%. She also announced that the presidential jet would be sold.

=== Global Leaders Council for Reproductive Health ===
In 2010, Banda became a member of the Global Leaders Council for Reproductive Health, a group of sixteen sitting and former heads of state, high-level policymakers and other leaders committed to advancing reproductive health for lasting development and prosperity. Chaired by former President of Ireland Mary Robinson, these leaders seek to mobilise the political will and financial resources necessary to achieve universal access to reproductive health by 2015 – a key target of the UN Millennium Development Goals.

=== Accolades ===
==== National awards ====
- Woman of the Year, Malawi, 1997
- Woman of the Year, Malawi, 1998
- Nyasa Times Multimedia "Person of the Year", 2010

==== International awards ====
- Martin Luther King Jr. Drum Major Award, 2012, Washington D.C.
- Legends Award for Leadership, 2012, Greater African Methodist Episcopal Church
- Women of Substance Award, 2010, African Women Development Fund
- Africa Prize for Leadership for the Sustainable End of Hunger, 1997, The Hunger Project, New York
- International Award for Entrepreneurship Development, 1998, Africa Federation of Women Entrepreneurs & UN Economic Commission for Africa
- 100 Heroines Award, 1998, Rochester, New York
- Certificate of Honors, 2001, Federation of World Peace and Love, Taiwan (Republic of China)
- Reykjavík Global Forum / Women Political Leaders (WPL) Trailblazer Award, 2020, Iceland

==== Honours ====
- Forbes magazine – World's Most Powerful Women: #40 (2014) | #47 (2013) | #71 (2012)
- Forbes magazine – Africa's Most Powerful Women: #1 (2012) | #3 (2011)
- Included in the "BBC 100 Women" series, October 2014
- Included in "Outstanding Women in Africa" list, 2022, New Africa Magazine

== See also ==
- Malawian Constitutional Crisis 2012
- List of current members of the National Assembly of Malawi
- National Association of Business Women (Malawi)

Political offices
| Preceded by George Chaponda | Minister of Foreign Affairs; 2006–2009 | Succeeded by Etta Banda |
| Preceded by Cassim Chilumpha | Vice President of Malawi; 2009–2012 | Succeeded by Khumbo Kachali |
| Preceded by Bingu wa Mutharika | President of Malawi; 2012–2014 | Succeeded by Peter Mutharika |
