= Richard Banda =

Malawian barrister

His Lordship The Honourable Chief Justice Richard Banda SC

First Gentleman of Malawi
- In role 7 April 2012 – 31 May 2014
- President: Joyce Banda
- Preceded by: Callista Chimombo
- Succeeded by: Gertrude Maseko

Chief Justice of Malawi
- In office 1992–2002

Chief Justice of Eswatini
- In office 2007–2010
- Succeeded by: Michael Ramodibedi

Personal details
- Born: Kawambwa, Northern Rhodesia
- Spouse: Joyce Banda

Richard Banda SC is a Malawian barrister and former athlete. He is a judge who formerly served as Chief Justice of Malawi and Eswatini and as Minister of Justice in Malawi. He was president of the Commonwealth Magistrates' and Judges' Association and Commonwealth Secretariat Arbitral Tribunal. As a sportsman, Banda was a track and field athlete and soccer player. He is the spouse of the former president of Malawi, Joyce Banda and, as such, was the first gentleman.

== Career ==
=== Athletic career ===
He played soccer for Malawi, was the captain of the Malawi national team, the Flames, and later was president of the Football Association of Malawi. As a track and field athlete, Banda represented Malawi in the high jump. He later became the president of the Olympic and Commonwealth Games Association of Malawi.

=== Legal career ===
Banda was called to the bar by Gray's Inn in July 1966. He then worked with the Malawi Government Legal Service until 1970. He was appointed the Director of Public Prosecution by the president of Malawi Hastings Banda (no relation) and later served as acting Solicitor General and Secretary for Justice. In April 1972 he was appointed Attorney General and became the first Malawian to be created Senior Counsel. He worked in these two roles until 1974 when he became Minister of Justice and Attorney General and was responsible for the Portfolio of Local Government until his resignation in 1976.

In 1980, he re-entered the Judicial Service to fill the newly created office of Chief Resident Magistrate. In November 1980 he was appointed a Judge of the High Court and Supreme Court of Malawi. In 1992 Banda was appointed the first black Chief Justice of Malawi until 2002. He was the president of the Commonwealth Magistrates' and Judges' Association (CMJA) 2000–2003.

He was the Chief Justice of Eswatini. He spoke against corruption and backlogs in the Swaziland Criminal Justice System. Banda was succeeded by Michael Ramodibedi after he retired due to his health.

== Honors and awards ==
- Chairman of African Parks (Majete), 2003–2007
- President, Commonwealth Secretariat Arbitral Tribunal
- President, Commonwealth Magistrates' and Judges' Association (CMJA), 2000–2003
- Honorary Life Fellow, Society of Advanced Legal Studies (constituent organization of the University of London)
- Honorary Master of the Bench, Gray's Inn

== Personal life ==
Banda was born in Kawambwa, Northern Rhodesia, near the border with Nyasaland (now Malawi). He is married to Malawi's fourth president, Joyce Banda. He is brother-in-law to Anjimile Oponyo.
