= Malawian past cabinets =

This is a list of past cabinets in Malawi that preceded the current cabinet of Malawi.

== Cabinet as of January 2022 ==
President Lazarus Chakwera's government as of January 2022, has 24 full ministers and 9 deputy ministers. Colleen Zamba is the current Secretary to the President and Cabinet. She replaced Zangazanga chikhosi after her appointment on 1 June 2022 The Secretary to the President and Cabinet is a civil service position which serves as head of the cabinet Secretariat. The Attorney General also attends cabinet as the chief legal advisor to government. Thabo Chakaka Nyirenda is the attorney general of Malawi.

Ministry	Minister
Ministry of Homeland Security	Jean Sendeza
Ministry of Land Resources, Housing and Urban Development	Sam Kawale
Ministry of Foreign Affairs and International Cooperation	Nancy Tembo
Ministry of Information and Digitalization	Gospel Kazako
Ministry of Local Government	Blessings Chinsinga
Ministry of Defence	Lazarus Chakwera
Ministry of Education, Science and Technology	Agness Nyalonje
Ministry of Health	Khumbize Kandodo Chiponda
Ministry of Labour	Vera Kamtukule
Ministry of Natural Resources	Eisenhower Mkaka
Ministry of Gender, Social Welfare	Patricia Kaliati
Ministry of Youth and Sports	Richard Chimwendo Banda
Ministry of Agriculture	Lobin Lowe
Ministry of Trade and Industry	Mark Katsonga
Ministry of Transport	Jacob Hara
Ministry of Finance and Economic Development	Sosten Gwengwe
Ministry of Justice and Constitutional Affairs	Titus Mvalo

== Cabinet of 2014 ==
Party key	Democratic Progressive Party
Party key	United Democratic Front

Cabinet of Malawi: June 2014 – 1919
Portrait	Portfolio	Incumbent	Term began
	President; Minister of Defence; Commander-in-chief of the Armed and Police forces	H.E. Peter Mutharika	31 May 2014 –
	Vice President; Minister for Civil Service	Rt. Hon. Saulos Chilima	31 May 2014 –
	Minister of Agriculture and Irrigation	Hon. Allan Chiyembekeza MP	19 June 2014 –
	Minister of Education, Science and Technology	Hon. Emmanuel Fabiano MP	19 June 2014 –
	Minister of Finance, Economic Planning and Development	Hon. Goodall Gondwe	6 June 2014 –
	Minister of Foreign Affairs and International cooperation	Hon. George Chaponda MP	19 June 2014 –
	Minister of Gender, Children, Disability and Social Welfare	Hon. Patricia Kaliati MP	23 June 2014 –
	Minister of Health	Hon. Peter Kumpalume MP	19 June 2014 –
	Minister of Home Affairs	Hon. Paul Chibingu MP	23 June 2014 –
	Minister of Information, Tourism and Civic Education	Hon. Kondwani Nankhumwa MP	19 June 2014 –
	Minister of Justice and Constitutional Affairs	Hon. Samuel Tembenu	19 June 2014 –
	Minister of Labour	Hon. Henry Mussa MP	19 June 2014 –
	Minister of Lands, Housing and Urban Development	Hon. Bright Msaka	23 June 2014 –
	Minister of Local Government and Rural Development	Hon. Trasizio Gowelo MP	23 June 2014 –
	Minister of Natural Resources, Energy and Mining	Hon. Atupele Muluzi MP	23 June 2014 –
	Minister of Trade and Industry	Hon. Joseph Mwanamveka MP	23 June 2014 –
	Minister of Transport and Public works	Hon. Francis Kasaila MP	19 June 2014 –
	Minister of Youth, Sports and Culture	Hon. Grace Chiumia MP	19 June 2014 –
Deputy Ministers
	Deputy Minister of Defence	Hon. Jappie Mhango MP	23 June 2014 –
	Deputy Minister of Education Science and Technology	Hon. Vincent Ghambi MP	23 June 2014 –

== Cabinet as of September 8, 2011 ==
On 19 August 2011, President Bingu wa Mutharika sacked his 42-member cabinet and took over all portfolios until further notice. He announced a new trimmed down cabinet on September 7, 2011, which was to be sworn in on September 8, 2011.

Ministry	Position	Officeholder
Office of the President and Cabinet	President	Bingu wa Mutharika
National Coordinator, Maternal Infant and Child Health, HIV/Nutrition/Malaria and tuberculosis	Minister	Callista Mutharika
Foreign Affairs and International Cooperation	Minister	Peter Mutharika
Office of the President and Cabinet	Vice President	Joyce Banda
Agriculture and Food Security	Minister	Peter Mwanza
Agriculture and Food Security	Deputy Minister	Dr.Margaret Roka Mauwa
Agriculture and Food Security	Deputy Minister	Dr.Kingsely Namakhwa
Finance	Minister	Dr.Ken Lipenga
Finance	Deputy Minister	Dr.Cornelius Mwalwanda
Education, Science and Technology	Minister	Dr.George Chaponda
Education, Science and Technology	Deputy — Higher Education	Wictor Songazaudzu Sajeni
Education, Science and Technology	Deputy — Primary Education	Otria Jere
Transport and Public Infrastructure	Minister	Sidik Mia
Transport and Public Infrastructure	Deputy Minister	Catherine Gotani Hara
Justice and Constitutional Affairs	Minister	Ephraim Chiume
Local Government and Rural Development	Minister	Henry Mussa
Local Government and Rural Development	Deputy Minister	Chimango Mughogho-Gondwe
Trade and Industry	Minister	John Bande
Lands, Housing and Urban Development	Minister	Yunus Mussa
Lands, Housing and Urban Development	Deputy Minister	Rev. Dr.Christopher Ngwira
Gender, Child & Community Development	Minister	Reen Kachere
Gender, Child & Community Development	Deputy Minister	Nasrin Pillane
Tourism, Wildlife and Culture	Minister	Daniel Liwimbi
Youth Development and Sports	Minister	Simon Vuwa Kaunda
Health	Minister	Jean Kalilani
Health	Deputy Minister	Ralph Jooma
Home Affairs	Minister	Aaron Sangala
Labor	Minister	Dr.Lucious Kanyumba
Information and Civic Education	Minister	Patricia Kaliati
Natural Resources, Energy and Environment Affairs	Minister	Goodall Gondwe
Natural Resources, Energy and Environment Affairs	Deputy Minister	Flamenga Chelewani

== Cabinet as of 19 August 2011 ==
On 19 August 2011, President Bingu wa Mutharika sacked his 42-member cabinet and took over all portfolios until further notice. Vice President Joyce Banda constitutionally remained the country's vice president, although she was expelled from the ruling Democratic Progressive Party in December 2010 (See DPP Party cabinet).

== Cabinet as of 9 August 2010 ==
The cabinet announced on 9 August 2010 was as follows:

Ministry	Position	Officeholder
Office of the President	President	Bingu wa Mutharika
Office of the President	Vice-president	Joyce Banda
Office of the President	Deputy Minister for Presidential Affairs	Nicholas Dausi
Agriculture and Food Security	Minister	Peter Mwanza
Agriculture and Food Security	Deputy Minister	Margaret Roka Mauwa
Foreign Affairs	Minister	Prof. Etta Elizabeth Banda
Foreign Affairs	Deputy Minister	Steven Kamwendo
Finance :	Minister	Ken Kandodo
Finance :	Deputy Minister	Fraser Nihorya
Education, Science and Technology	Minister	Peter Mutharika
Education, Science and Technology	Deputy — Higher Education	Otria Jere
Education, Science and Technology	Deputy — Primary Education	Victor Sajeni
Development, Planning and Cooperation	Minister	Abbie Shaba
Development, Planning and Cooperation	Deputy Minister	Daniel Liwimbi
Transport and Public Infrastructure	Minister	Sidik Mia
Transport and Public Infrastructure	Deputy Minister	McJones Shaba
Justice and Constitutional Affairs	Minister	George Chaponda
Irrigation and Water Development	Minister	Richie Muheya
Irrigation and Water Development	Deputy Minister	Grenenger Msulira Banda
Local Government and Rural Development	Minister	Anna Kachikho
Local Government and Rural Development	Deputy Minister	Francis Kasaila
Industry and Trade	Minister	Eunice Kazembe
Industry and Trade	Deputy Minister	Shadreck Jonas
Lands, Housing and Urban Development	Minister	John Bande
Lands, Housing and Urban Development	Deputy Minister	Billy Kaunda
Gender, Child & Community Development	Minister	Theresa Mwale
Gender, Child & Community Development	Deputy Minister	Catherine Gotani Hara
Tourism, Wildlife and Culture	Minister	Ken Lipenga
Tourism, Wildlife and Culture	Deputy Minister	Augustine Mtendere
Labour	Minister	Yunus Mussa
Youth Development and Sports	Minister	Lucius Kanyumba
Youth Development and Sports	Deputy Minister	Charles Mchacha
Health	Minister	David Mphande
Health	Deputy Minister	Felton Mulli
Internal Affairs and Public Security	Minister	Aaron Sangala
Internal Affairs and Public Security	Deputy Minister	Annie Lemani
National Defence	Minister	Leckford Thotho
Information and Civic Education	Minister	Vuwa Symon Kaunda
Information and Civic Education	Deputy Minister	Tarsizio Gowelo
Natural Resources, Energy and Environment	Minister	Grain Malunga
Natural Resources, Energy and Environment	Deputy Minister	Ephraim Chiume
Persons with Disabilities and the Elderly	Minister	Reen Kachere
Persons with Disabilities and the Elderly	Deputy Minister	Chimango Mughogho
Maternal, Infant and Child Health (Safe Motherhood)	Minister	Callista Chimombo

== Cabinet as of 15 June 2009 ==
The cabinet that became effective on 15 June 2009 was:

Ministry	Position	Officeholder
Office of the President	President	Dr. Bingu wa Mutharika
Office of the President	Vice President	Joyce Banda
Agriculture and Food Security	Minister	Dr. Bingu wa Mutharika
Agriculture and Food Security	Deputy Minister	Margaret Roka Mauwa (Ms.)
Finance	Minister	Ken Kandodo
Finance	Deputy Minister	Fraser Nkhoma Nihora
Foreign Affairs	Minister	Dr. Etta Banda
Foreign Affairs	Deputy Minister	Augustine Mtendere
Education	Minister	George Chaponda
Education	Deputy - Higher Education, Science & Technology	Otria Moyo Jere
Education	Deputy -Primary Education	Victor Sajeni
Development Planning and Cooperation	Minister	Abbie Marambika Shaba
Development Planning and Cooperation	Deputy Minister	Daniel Liwimbi
Transport and Works	Minister	Khumbo Kachali
Transport and Works	Deputy Minister	Lazaro Kasaila
Justice	Minister	Dr. Peter Mutharika
Irrigation	Minister	Ritchie Bizwick Muyewa
Irrigation	Deputy Minister	Grenenger Msulira Banda
Local Government	Minister	Anna Kachikho
Local Government	Deputy Minister	MacJones Mandala Shawa
Industry and Trade	Minister	Eunice Kazembe (Ms)
Industry and Trade	Deputy Minister	Steven Stanford Kamwendo
Lands and Housing and Urban development	Minister	Dr. Peter Mwanza
Lands and Housing and Urban development	Deputy Minister	Tarsiziu Tony Gowelo
Gender, Children and Community Development	Minister	Patricia Kaliati (Ms)
Gender, Children and Community Development	Deputy Minister	Catherine Gotani Hara (Ms)
Tourism, Wildlife	Minister	Anna Kachikho (Ms)
Tourism, Wildlife	Deputy Minister	Shadreck Jonasi
Labour	Minister	Yunus Mussa
Labour	Deputy Minister	John Bande
Youth and Sports	Minister	Dr Lucius Kanyumba
Youth and Sports	Deputy Minister	Billy Kaunda
Health	Minister	Prof. Moses Chirambo
Health	Deputy Minister	Gloria Mwale (Ms)
Home Affairs	Minister	Aaron Sangala
Home Affairs	Deputy Minister	Annie Lemani (Ms)
National Defence	Minister	Sidik Mia
Information and Civil Education	Minister	Leckford Mwanza Thotho
Information and Civil Education	Deputy Minister	Kingsely Namakhwa
Natural Resources and Energy	Minister	Grey Malunga
Natural Resources and Energy	Deputy Minister	Ephraim Chiume
Disabilities and Aged	Minister	Bessie Reen Kachere (Ms)
Disabilities and Aged	Deputy Minister	Felton Mulli

== Cabinet as of November 2007 ==
Key ministers as of November 2007 were:

Ministry	Minister
Agriculture & food security	Bingu wa Mutharika
Defence	Bob Khamisa
Economic planning & development	Ted Kalebe
Education, science & technology	Bingu wa Mutharika
Energy & mines	Chimunthu Banda
Finance	Goodall Gondwe
Foreign affairs	Joyce Banda
Health	Marjory Ngaunje
Home affairs & internal security	Ernest Malenga
Information & civic education	Patricia Kaliati
Justice	Henry Dama Phoya
Labour	Anna Kachikho
Lands & natural resources	Khumbo Chirwa
Local government & rural development	George Chaponda
Presidential & parliamentary affairs	Davies Katsonga
Tourism, wildlife & culture	Callista Chimombo
Trade & industry	Ken Lipenga
Transport, public works & housing	Henry Mussa
Youth development & sports	Khumbo Kachali

== Cabinet as of February 2005 ==
The cabinet that became effective in February 2005 was:

Ministry	Position	Officeholder
Office of the President	President	Dr. Bingu wa Mutharika
Office of the President	Vice President	Dr. Cassim Chilumpha
Defence, the Civil Service, Statutory Corporations and Privatisation	Minister	Dr. Bingu wa Mutharika
Water Development	Minister	Dr. Cassim Chilumpha
Agriculture, Irrigation and Food Security	Minister	Gwanda Chakuamba
Agriculture, Irrigation and Food Security	Deputy Minister	Elizabeth Aipira (Mrs.)
Finance	Minister	Goodall E. Gondwe
Economic Planning and Development	Minister	David Faiti
Foreign Affairs	Minister	Davis Katsonga
Justice and Constitutional Affairs	Minister	Henry Phoya
Industry, Science and Technology	Minister	Khumbo Chirwa
Industry, Science and Technology	Deputy Minister	Charles Mchacha
Home Affairs and Internal Security	Minister	Uladi Mussa
Trade and Private Sector Development	Minister	Dr. Martin Kansichi
Education and Human Resources	Minister	Yusuf Mwawa
Education and Human Resources	Deputy Minister	Anna Kachikho (Mrs.)
Transport and Public Works	Minister	Henry Mussa
Transport and Public Works	Deputy Minister	Roy Cumsay
Lands, Housing and Surveys	Minister	Bazuka Mhango
Local Government and Rural Development	Minister	Dr. George Chaponda
Local Government and Rural Development	Deputy Minister	Patricia Kaliati (Mrs.)
Information and Tourism	Minister	Dr. Kenneth Lipenga
Information and Tourism	Deputy Minister	Henry Mumba
Labour Vocational Training	Minister	Jaffalie Mussa
Health	Minister	Dr. Hetherwick Ntaba
Health	Deputy Minister	Frank Tumpale Mwenifumbo
Mines, Natural Resources and Environment	Minister	Eunice Kazembe
Mines, Natural Resources and Environment	Deputy Minister	Sidik Mia
Youth, Sports and Culture	Minister	Henry Chimunthu Banda
Women, Child Welfare and Community Services	Minister	Joyce Banda (Mrs.)
Social Development and Persons with Disabilities	Minister	Clement Chiwaya

== Cabinet as of June 2004 ==
The cabinet that became effective in June 2004 was:

Ministry	Position	Officeholder
Office of the President	President	Dr. Bingu wa Mutharika
Office of the President	Vice President	Dr. Cassim Chilumpha
Defence and Civil Service	Minister	Dr. Bingu wa Mutharika
Statutory Corporations	Minister	Dr. Cassim Chilumpha
Agriculture and Food Security	Minister	Dr. Chakufwa Chihana
Agriculture and Food Security	Deputy Minister	Sidik Mia
Finance	Minister	Goodall Gondwe
Economic Planning and Development	Minister	David Faiti
Foreign Affairs	Minister	Dr. George Chaponda
Justice and Constitutional Affairs	Minister	Henry Phoya
Industry, Science and Technology	Minister	Khumbo Chirwa
Industry, Science and Technology	Deputy Minister	Eylin Kalonga
Home Affairs and Internal Security	Minister	Uladi Mussa
Trade and Private Sector Development	Minister	Eunice Kazembe
Trade and Private Sector Development	Deputy Minister	E. Ntafu (Mrs.)
Education and Human Resources	Minister	Yusuf Mwawa
Education and Human Resources	Deputy Minister	Anna Kachikho
Transport and Public Works	Minister	Henry Mussa
Transport and Public Works	Deputy Minister	Roy Cumsay
Lands, Housing and Surveys	Minister	Bazuka Mhango
Local Government and Rural Development	Minister	Jaffalie Mussa
Local Government and Rural Development	Deputy Minister	Patricia Kaliati
Information, Communications and Tourism	Minister	Kenneth Lipenga
Information, Communications and Tourism	Deputy Minister	Henry Mumba
Labour Vocational Training	Minister	Lilian Patel
Health	Minister	Dr. Hetherwick Ntaba
Health	Deputy Minister	Frank Tumpale Mwenifumbo
Mines, Natural Resources and Environment	Minister	Davis Katsonga
Mines, Natural Resources and Environment	Deputy Minister	Bob Khamisa
Youth, Sports and Culture	Minister	Henry Chimunthu Banda
Women, Child Welfare and Community Services	Minister	Joyce Banda
Social Development and Persons with Disabilities	Minister	Clement Chiwaya
