= 2009 Malawian general election =

General Election held in Malawi on 19 May 2009

- 19 May 2009
- Presidential election
- Registered: 5,894,743
- Turnout: 74.14% (▲14.79 pp)
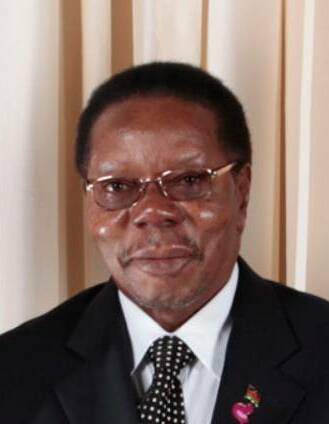

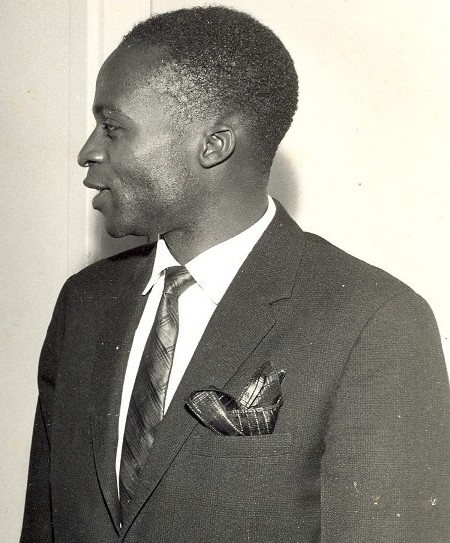
Nominee	Bingu wa Mutharika	John Tembo
Party	DPP	MCP
Running mate	Joyce Banda	Brown Mpinganjira
Popular vote	2,856,410	1,362,441
Percentage	65.45%	31.22%
- Results by region (left) and district (right)
President before election
Bingu wa Mutharika
DPP
Elected President
Bingu wa Mutharika
DPP
- Legislative election
- All 193 seats in the National Assembly; 97 seats needed for a majority
- Turnout: 78.01% (▲18.60 pp)
Party	Leader	Vote %	Seats	+/–
DPP	Bingu wa Mutharika	39.99	113	New
MCP	John Tembo	12.94	27	−30
UDF	Bakili Muluzi	12.92	17	−33
AFORD		0.88	1	−5
MPP		0.40	1	New
MAFUNDE		0.16	1	+1
Independents	–	29.12	32	−7
This lists parties that won seats. See the complete results below.

General elections were held in Malawi on 19 May 2009. Incumbent President Bingu wa Mutharika ran for re-election; his main opponent was John Tembo, the president of the Malawi Congress Party (MCP). Five other candidates also ran. The election was won by Mutharika, who was re-elected to the Presidency with around two-thirds of the vote. Mutharika's DPP also won a strong parliamentary majority.

== Electoral system ==
Voter registration started in August 2008 and was scheduled to end on 29 November 2008, but on 20 November (by which time 3.5 million voters had been registered) it was announced that registration would be extended into December. This extension was caused by problems related to digital cameras that were necessary to the process.

Between 2 February and 6 February, presidential and parliamentary candidates submitted their nomination papers. The official campaigning period began on 17 March and was scheduled to conclude on 17 May. Parliament was dissolved on 20 March, in accordance with the constitution, and subsequently the Malawi Electoral Commission (MEC) would announce the eligible candidates.

== Campaign ==
On 22 October 2008, Hetherwick Ntaba, the Secretary-General of the Democratic Progressive Party (DPP), announced that the DPP national governing council had unanimously endorsed Mutharika as the party's presidential candidate a few days earlier. However, Foreign Minister Joyce Banda said on 16 January 2009 that Mutharika felt the endorsement of the council was inadequate and that he wanted the endorsement of the party's base. Therefore, he sought the backing of the delegates at a DPP convention. Later, as the DPP presidential candidate, Mutharika chose Banda as his vice-presidential candidate.

Bakili Muluzi, who was designated as the UDF's (United Democratic Front) presidential candidate, previously served two terms as president from 1994 to 2004. According to the constitution, a president is allowed to serve no more than two consecutive five-year terms. Because Muluzi had been out of office since 2004, his supporters argued that the term limit should not apply to him, as it did not restrict nonconsecutive terms if interpreted literally.

Speaking to Capital Radio on 22 February 2009, Muluzi accused the government of using intimidation against his candidacy and warned that such conduct could lead to "problems". A few days later, he was charged by the Anti-Corruption Bureau with stealing 12 million dollars of aid money; he appeared before a court in Blantyre and was released on bail. The Electoral Commission stated he was not eligible to run again, but his supporters are calling for an official court decision instead. On 16 May, only three days before the election, the Constitutional Court ruled that Muluzi could not run again.

MCP President John Tembo was considered the main opposition candidate, and the MCP formed an electoral alliance with the UDF prior to the election. Tembo's vice-presidential candidate was Brown Mpinganjira of the UDF. Observing that the DPP had never participated in an election (it was founded in 2005), Tembo argued that he and the MCP had the experience to govern the country properly: "I belong to the past, I belong to the present and I also belong to the future."

Independent candidate James Nyondo submitted his nomination papers on 4 February and claims to have sponsored over 120 independent parliamentary candidates by paying the MK 100,000 ($700 USD) nomination fee. He is the only independent candidate in the 2009 presidential election and has campaigned on the need for a new generation of leadership, a smaller cabinet, and an end to the personal extravagance of the current and previous governments.

Loveness Gondwe of the New Rainbow Coalition submitted her presidential candidacy on 3 February, becoming the first woman to run for president in Malawi. She stressed the importance of holding a free and fair election and avoiding the kind of post-election turmoil that affected Kenya and Zimbabwe in 2008.

Observers expected a close election between the two strongest candidates, Mutharika and Tembo. While Tembo enjoyed the united backing of the country's two most established and powerful parties—the MCP and the UDF—he faced an incumbent president who had presided over strong economic growth of 8%, and the outcome was considered uncertain.

Mutharika, who was 75 years old at the time of the election, said that he would retire from politics if he lost the election and that he would retire in 2014 if he was successful in winning a second term.

== Conduct ==
On the day of the election, Joy Radio, which is owned by UDF Chairman Bakili Muluzi, was closed by the police after it broadcast a satire that lampooned Mutharika. Two of the station's presenters and a technician were arrested. Tembo alleged that the government had committed electoral fraud with opposition poll agents being denied access to the vote counting centres. An EU observation team also noted that state television had failed to be neutral during the election campaigns, supporting the government.

== Results ==
The Malawi Electoral Commission declared that Bingu wa Mutharika had won the presidential election on 21 May 2009, after 93% of votes had been counted. Mutharika gained 2.9 million votes with John Tembo, his nearest rival, winning 1.4 million.

=== President ===
Candidate	Running mate	Party	Votes	%
Bingu wa Mutharika	Joyce Banda	Democratic Progressive Party	2,856,410	65.45
John Tembo	Brown Mpinganjira	Malawi Congress Party	1,362,441	31.22
Kamuzu Walter Chibambo	Stanley Alex Robert Mnenula	People's Transformation Party	34,424	0.79
Stanley Edingtone Masauli	Sophie Kuthyola	Republican Party	32,926	0.75
Loveness Gondwe	Beatrice Roseby Mwale	New Rainbow Coalition	31,421	0.72
James Mbowe Nyondo	Vivian Mark Thunyani	Independent	27,046	0.62
Dindi Gowa Nyasulu	Chinkhokwe Tyson Banda	Alliance for Democracy	19,849	0.45
Total			4,364,517	100.00
Valid votes			4,364,517	99.86
Invalid/blank votes			5,925	0.14
Total votes			4,370,442	100.00
Registered voters/turnout			5,894,743	74.14

=== National Assembly ===
In the National Assembly elections, the DPP won 114 seats (though the election of the vice president vacated one of those), obtaining a strong majority in the 193-seat National Assembly, while the MCP trailed distantly with 26 seats and the UDF won only 17. Mutharika and the DPP won an overwhelming victory in northern Malawi, but also performed well in the central and southern regions, although those regions have been historically dominated by the MCP and UDF respectively. Some analysts suggested that this election marked a departure from Malawi's traditional voting patterns, which are heavily influenced by region. Unlike Tembo, Muluzi accepted the official results of the election. 32 independent MPs were elected, though many of those started joining the DPP after the election; one seat was won by the Maravi People's Party (MPP), the Alliance for Democracy (Aford) and the Malawi Forum for Unity and Development (MAFUNDE). In the Blantyre City Centre constituency, the election was postponed due to the death of a candidate, a by-election was held in August 2009, which was won by an independent candidate.

Party	Votes	%	Seats	+/–
Democratic Progressive Party	1,739,202	39.99	113	New
Malawi Congress Party	562,859	12.94	27	–30
United Democratic Front	562,025	12.92	17	–33
People's Progressive Movement	48,389	1.11	0	–7
New Republican Party	43,009	0.99	0	New
Alliance for Democracy	38,427	0.88	1	–5
New Rainbow Coalition	30,847	0.71	0	New
Congress of Democrats	19,432	0.45	0	New
Maravi People's Party	17,609	0.40	1	New
People's Transformation Party	8,498	0.20	0	–1
Malawi Forum for Unity and Development	6,831	0.16	1	+1
Republican Party	4,111	0.09	0	–15
Malawi Democratic Party	456	0.01	0	0
National Patriotic Front	438	0.01	0	New
National Unity Party	284	0.01	0	0
People's Popular Front	128	0.00	0	New
Congress for National Unity	92	0.00	0	–1
Independents	1,266,681	29.12	32	–7
Vacant			1	–
Total	4,349,318	100.00	193	0
Valid votes	4,349,318	95.37		
Invalid/blank votes	211,074	4.63		
Total votes	4,560,392	100.00		
Registered voters/turnout	5,846,264	78.01		

==== Elected MPs ====
A partial list of elected MPs from 156 constituencies:

MP	Party	Constituency	Region
Kezzie Kasambala Msukwa	IND	Chitipa East	Northern
Gertrude Hendrina Maseko	DPP	Balaka North	Southern
Nicholas Harry Dausi	IND	Mwanza Central	Southern
Paul Lackson Zakaliya Chibingu	DPP	Mwanza West	Southern
Felix Njawala	IND	Blantyre Kabula	Southern
Jeffrey Ntelemuka	DPP	Blantyre City South-East	Southern
Henry Mussa	DPP	Chiradzulu East	Southern
Margaret Roka Mauwa	DPP	Chiradzulu North	Southern
Eunice Kazembe	DPP	Chiradzulu South	Southern
George Namatumbo	DPP	Chiradzulu West	Southern
Clement Terence Chiwaya	UDF	Mangochi Central	Southern
Fraser Nihorya	DPP	Mulanje Limbuli	Southern
Stephen Namacha	DPP	Mulanje North	Southern
Richie Bizwick Muheya	DPP	Mulanje South	Southern
Patricia Annie Kaliati	DPP	Mulanje West	Southern
Geoffrey Henock Mbuzi	DPP	Ntchisi North-East	Central
Albert G.M. Doza Thindwa	DPP	Rumphi East	Northern
Prof. Moses C. Chirambo	DPP	Rumphi Central	Northern
Austin Jatula Mkandawire	DPP	Rumphi West	Northern
Tasokwa Caseby Msiska	DPP	Rumphi North	Northern
Olivia Anita Thundu	IND	Likoma Islands	Northern
Chimunthu Banda	DPP	Nkhotakota North	Central
Daniel Liwimbi	DPP	Nkhotakota North-East	Central
Edwin Banda	IND	Nkhotakota Central	Central
Cassim Chilumpha Dr.	IND	Nkhotakota South	Central
Agnes Mandevu M. Chatipwa	IND	Nkhotakota South East	Central
Chimango Chipimpha Mughogho	IND	Chitipa South	Northern
Luwi Alinuwila Msongole	DPP	Chitipa Central	Northern
Aladin Nixon Masebo	DPP	Chitipa North	Northern
Godfrey Mudulansi Munkhondya	IND	Chitipa Wenya	Northern
Vincent Winstone Ghambi	DPP	Karonga North	Northern
Beatrice Kankhonde Mwangonde	DPP	Karonga North West	Northern
Cornelius Thomson Mwalwanda	IND	Karonga Central	Northern
Khwauli Msiska	AFORD	Karonga Nyungwe	Northern
Chembe Glad Munthali	DPP	Karonga South	Northern
Peter Nelson Mwanza	DPP	Mzuzu City	Northern
Goodall Edward Gondwe	DPP	Mzimba North	Northern
Catherine Gotani Hara	DPP	Mzimba North East	Northern
Billy Kaunda	IND	Mzimba West	Northern
Paul Shawa	IND	Mzimba South	Northern
Donton Samuel Job Mkandawire	DPP	Mzimba Central	Northern
Rev. Christopher S. Mzomera Ngwira	NARC	Mzimba Hora	Northern
Dr Bofomo Immanuel Nyirenda	DPP	Mzimba Luwelezi	Northern
Patrick Akimu Mwanza	DPP	Mzimba Solora	Northern
Abbie Marambika Shaba	DPP	Mzimba East	Northern
Khumbo Hastings Kachali	DPP	Mzimba South West	Northern
Rabson Chihaula Shaba	DPP	Mzimba South East	Northern
Ephraim Mganda Chiume	DPP	Nkhata-Bay North	Northern
Symon Vuwa Kaunda	DPP	Nkhata-Bay Central	Northern
Grace Chiumia	DPP	Nkhata-Bay West	Northern
David Yohane Kaweche	DPP	Nkhata-Bay North West	Northern
David Kapenyela Mphande	DPP	Nkhata-Bay South East	Northern
Etta Elizabeth Banda	DPP	Nkhata-Bay South	Northern
McJones Mzondi Mandala Shaba	DPP	Kasungu North	Central
Grenner Nkhata	DPP	Kasungu North North-East	Central
Otria Moyo Jere	DPP	Kasungu West	Central
Moses Arthur Chingayipe Mtegha	DPP	Kasungu North-West	Central
Vasco Mtunduwatha Chimbalu	IND	Kasungu South	Central
Bokosi G Khamba	DPP	Kasungu South East	Central
Grenenger K. Msulira Banda	DPP	Kasungu East	Central
Ken Edward Kandodo	DPP	Kasungu Central	Central
Eugustine Gracewell Mtendere	DPP	Kasungu North East	Central
Victor Baudala sanjeni Songazaudzu	DPP	Ntchisi East	Central
Jermoth Ulemu Chilapondwa	DPP	Ntchisi South	Central
Herbert Josiya Bimphi	DPP	Ntchisi North	Central
Bauleni Jimmy Manna	DPP	Dowa East	Central
Hastings Petros Chitsamba	DPP	Dowa South-East	Central
Leckford Thotho Mwanza	DPP	Dowa North-East	Central
Ewart Cara Gawanani	DPP	Dowa Ngala	Central
Jean Alfazema Nachika Kalilani	DPP	Dowa Central	Central
Abel Kayembe	IND	Dowa West	Central
Benjamin Chikusa	IND	Dowa North	Central
Yona Kamphamtengo	MCP	Salima North	Central
Benjamini Benzani Mangira	DPP	Salima Central	Central
Uladi Mussa	MPP	Salima South	Central
Killiot Kufuna	MCP	Salima South-East	Central
Deriah Kankhwani	DPP	Salima North-West	Central
Rachel Zulu Mazombwe	IND	Mchinji North	Central
Alex Chitete	MCP	Mchinji North-East	Central
Ellen Thokozani Solomoni Chisale	DPP	Mchinji East	Central
Theresa Gloria Mwale	DPP	Mchinji West	Central
Jerome Gervazio Waluza	IND	Mchinji South	Central
Francis Leobin Mussa Banda	DPP	Mchinji South-West	Central
Patrick Zebron Chilondola	MCP	Dedza North	Central
Sosten Gwengwe	MCP	Dedza Central	Central
Clement Claude Mlombwa	MCP	Dedza South-West	Central
Wodala Alekeni Menyani	MCP	Dedza North-West	Central
Hyacinta Palingana Chikaonda	DPP	Dedza East	Central
Phllipo Chinkhondo	MCP	Dedza West	Central
McSteyn Swithin Mkomba	MCP	Dedza Central-East	Central
John Zenas Ungapake Tembo	MCP	Dedza South	Central
Everton Herbert Chimulirenji	DPP	Ntcheu North-East	Central
Stevin Stafford Kamwendo	DPP	Ntcheu Bwanje North	Central
Grandson Lucious Kanyumba	DPP	Ntcheu Bwanje South	Central
Jones Vincent Chingola	DPP	Ntcheu Central	Central
Damson Chimalira	DPP	Ntcheu South	Central
Shadreck Assan Lipande	DPP	Ntcheu North	Central
Chikumbutso John Hiwa	DPP	Ntcheu West	Central
Christina Winnie Chiwoko	DPP	Lilongwe Mapuyu North	Central
Joseph Njovuyalema	MCP	Lilongwe Mapuyu South	Central
Bazilio Lunia Titus Malipa	MCP	Lilongwe North	Central
Vitus Gonamtunda Dzoole Mwale	MCP	Lilongwe Msozi South	Central
Godfrey Kamanya	IND	Lilongwe Msozi North	Central
Maureen Katani Bondo	MCP	Lilongwe Kumachenga	Central
Lefani Maxwell Thyolera	MCP	Lilongwe North-East	Central
Edwin Bhagwanji	DPP	Lilongwe City West	Central
Joyce A. Banda	IND	Lilongwe Mpenu Nkhoma	Central
Makala Watson Ngozo	MCP	Lilongwe Mpenu	Central
Gwengwe Alfred Willard	MCP	Lilongwe South East	Central
Ezakiel Peter Ching'oma	MCP	Lilongwe East	Central
Shadreck Jonasi	DPP	Lilongwe City Central	Central
Lobin Lowe	MCP	Lilongwe Central	Central
Ishmail Fillimon Chafukira	MCP	Lilongwe North-West	Central
Jolly Saweta Dyson Kalelo	IND	Lilongwe City North	Central
Jean Muonaowuza Sendeza	MCP	Lilongwe South West	Central
Agnes Nandau Penumlungu	DPP	Lilongwe City South East	Central
Wells John Adam	DPP	Lilongwe City South West	Central
Peter Stanley Patisi Chalera	MCP	Lilongwe Msinja North	Central
Lingson Kambewa W. Belekanyama	MCP	Lilongwe Msinja South	Central
Patson Kachingwe Mthyoka	MCP	Lilongwe South	Central
Yaumi Aufi Mpaweni	UDF	Balaka Central East	Southern
Nasrin Pillane	DPP	Balaka West	Southern
George Nnensa	Mafunde	Balaka South	Southern
Ibrahim Imed Matola	UDF	Mangochi North	Southern
Alfred Mkwanda Mwechumu	UDF	Mangochi North-East	Southern
Hassan Ailalie Ajinga	UDF	Mangochi Malombe	Southern
Abukakar Mbaya	UDF	Mangochi East	Southern
Yusuf Billiati Matumula	IND	Mangochi South	Southern
Asibu Shamil	UDF	Mangochi South West	Southern
Mahmudu John Lali	UDF	Mangochi Nkungulu	Southern
Stephen Okoma Atani Aipira	IND	Mangochi West	Southern
Ralph Pachalo Jooma	DPP	Mangochi Monkey Bay	Southern
Makumba Abdallah Shabani	IND	Mangochi Lutende	Southern
Moffat Malisie Yakiti	UDF	Mangochi Masongola	Southern
Atupele Muluzi	UDF	Machinga North-East	Southern
Shaibu Kaliati	UDF	Machinga Central	Southern
Ernest Yahaya	UDF	Machinga Central East	Southern
Kenneth Thomas Kamu	UDF	Machinga East	Southern
Harry Fabiano Kamba	UDF	Machinga South	Southern
Mwalone Jangiya	UDF	Machinga Likwenu	Southern
Rev. Wilson Ndomondo	UDF	Machinga South East	Southern
Jenipher Deborah Chilunga	DPP	Zomba Nsondole	Southern
Annie Lemani Singani Anambewe	DPP	Zomba Thondwe	Southern
Lonie Phiri Chijere Chirwa	DPP	Zomba Chingale	Southern
Grace Zinenani Maseko	DPP	Zomba Changalume	Southern
Enock Elias Luka	DPP	Zomba Lisanjala	Southern
Joyce Banda	DPP	Zomba Malosa	Southern
Ted Salule Masangwi	DPP	Zomba Ntonya	Southern
Yunus Mussa	DPP	Zomba Central	Southern
MacRonald John Table Khwepeya	IND	Zomba Likangala	Southern
Peter Chizalo Mangulenje	IND	Zomba Chisi	Southern
Reen Bessie Kachere	DPP	Neno South	Southern
Gladys Benson Tembo	DPP	Neno North	Southern

== Aftermath ==
Mutharika and Joyce Banda were respectively sworn in as president and vice-president on 22 May 2009. The MCP boycotted the event, but Muluzi was present. Some in the MCP called for the party to recognize Mutharika's victory and for Tembo to resign as MCP president. Tembo refused and vowed to legally challenge the results.
