= Shawa (disambiguation) =

Shawa is a village in the Lower Dir District of Khyber-Pakhtunkhwa, Pakistan. Shawa may also refer to:

- Amjad Shawa (born 1971), Palestinian humanitarian and human rights advocate
- Godfrey Shawa, Malawian politician
- Laila Shawa (1940–2022), Palestinian visual artist
- MacJones Mandala Shawa, Malawian politician and educator
- Mary Shawa, Malawian public official
- Rashad Shawa, namesake of the Rashad Shawa Cultural Center built in 1985, in Rimal, Gaza, Palestine
- Rawya Shawa (1944–2017), Palestinian journalist and politician
- Sami Shawa (1887–1960), Syrian violinist

== See also ==
- Abbie Shaba, sometimes transliterated as Shawa
- Shawia (disambiguation)
