= Allan Chiyembekeza =

Malawian politician

Minister of Agriculture and Irrigation of Malawi
- In office 19 June 2014 – 20 July 2019
- President: Peter Mutharika

Personal details
- Born: Malawi
- Party: Democratic Progressive Party (Malawi)

Allan Chiyembekeza is a Malawian politician and educator. He was the Minister of Agriculture and Irrigation of Malawi, having been appointed to the position on 12 January 2015 by former president of Malawi, Peter Mutharika. His term began on 31 May 2014. In 2016, he was the Minister of Agriculture, Irrigation and Water Development. As a minister of agriculture, he encouraged local farmers in the country to grow sorghum to deal with the effects of climate change.

He conducted a campaign to encourage farmers in Blantyre after he opened a five-day Agriculture Workshop on Enhancement of National Agriculture Extension Services Project, which was admired by several African countries. Over 14 representatives from different African countries and officials from the Malawi Government, as well as non-governmental organisations attended the workshop in Blantyre.

Yongkyu Kwon, a South Korea Ambassador, praised on how the project of sorghum was being organised in Malawi and farther admired similar projects that were being implemented in Uganda. The ambassador visited several districts in the country where the projects were being implemented including Nsanje district.

As the Minister of Agriculture, Irrigation and Water Development, Chiyembekeza addressed the nation in 2016 that farmers' harvestings were enough to feed the country, till next season. These remarks infuriated people in the country, as people were still spending long hours and nights at the admarc to buy staples. This was as the result after The Nation revealed that many people were queuing for maize husks (madeya/vingoma), which other people were distributing to villages surrounding the Catholic University in Chiradzulu District.

The minister was accompanied by Minister of Information, Jappie Mhango, when he said that tonnage in admarc’s custody, 25 220 MT will feed hungry the Southern Region, the Centre will have 16 863 MT while the North will have the remaining 8 417 MT.

Awards and achievements
Preceded by	Minister of Agriculture of Malawi	Succeeded by
