= Maravi People's Party =

Political party in Malawi

The Maravi People's Party (MPP) is a political party in Malawi.

== History ==
The party was established in June 2007 by Uladi Mussa and Paul Maulidi after Mussa left the Democratic Progressive Party (DPP). However, after Maulidi called for the party to join the DPP in an electoral alliance, he was expelled from the party, subsequently joining the DPP. In the 2009 general elections the party nominated eleven candidates, but only won a single seat, Salima North, which was taken by Mussa. However, in 2012 Mussa defected to the new People's Party established by President Joyce Banda. He subsequently attempted to dissolve the party, despite other members wanting to continue.

Ultimately the party was not dissolved, but in the 2014 elections it ran in only one constituency (Mulanje North), where party leader Yusuf Aufi received just 733 votes, failing to win a seat.
