= Peter Kumpalume =

Malawian politician

Minister of Health
- In office 19 June 2014 – 23 June 2018
- President: Peter Mutharika

Personal details
- Born: Malawi
- Party: Democratic Progressive Party (Malawi)

Peter Kumpalume is a Malawian politician and educator. He was the Minister of Health of Malawi, having been appointed to the position on 11 January 2013 by former president of Malawi Peter Mutharika. His term began on 19 June 2014.

Awards and achievements
Preceded by	Minister of Health of Malawi	Succeeded by
