= Vincent Ghambi =

Malawian politician

Deputy Minister of Education Science and Technology of Malawi
- In office 19 June 2014 – June 2016
- President: Peter Mutharika
- Minister: Deputy Minister of Defense of Malawi June 2016 to September 2020

Member of parliament
- In office May 2009 – September 2020

Personal details
- Born: 1 March 1963 (age 63) Malawi
- Party: Democratic Progressive Party (Malawi)

Vincent Ghambi is a Malawian politician and educator. He was the Deputy Minister of Education Science and Technology of Malawi, having been appointed to the position in 2014 by former president of Malawi Peter Mutharika. His term began on 31 May 2014.

Before joining politics he had been doing business in the central and north of Malawi namely into farming, transportation and borehole drilling.

He then served as Deputy Minister of Education Science and Technology in 2014 before being moved to Deputy Ministers of Defense in 2016.

Awards and achievements
Preceded by	Deputy Minister of Education Science and Technology of Malawi	Succeeded by
