= John Bande =

Malawian politician

Honorable John F. Bande is the current Deputy Minister of Water and Sanitation in Malawi. He is the Member of Parliament for Blantyre City East. In 2006 he served as the Deputy Minister of Information & Civic Education.

== Housing scandal ==
As Minister he publicly declared that there was deep rooted corruption in his ministry. During his tenure as Minister of Lands and housing there was a housing scandal in Malawi that led to public houses being sold without being advertised. The scandal was exposed by The Daily Times in Malawi and alleged that top ministers including the former Education Minister Professor Peter Mutharika, Attorney General Dr. Jane Ansah and the Democratic Progressive Party (DPP) Regional Governor for the South, Noel Masangwi were beneficiaries. An investigation is still being conducted by the Anti Corruption Bureau.
