= Trasizio Gowelo =

Malawian politician

Minister of Local Government and Rural Development of Malawi
- In office 19 June 2014 – 17 September 2019
- President: Peter Mutharika

Personal details
- Born: Malawi
- Party: Democratic Progressive Party (Malawi)

Trasizio Gowelo is a Malawian politician and educator. He was the Minister of Local Government and Rural Development of Malawi, having been appointed to the position in 2014 by former president of Malawi Peter Mutharika. His term began on 31 May 2014.

Awards and achievements
Preceded by	Minister of Local Government and Rural Development of Malawi	Succeeded by
