= Paul Chibingu =

Malawian politician

Minister of Home Affairs of Malawi
- In office 19 June 2014 – 23 June 2018
- President: Peter Mutharika

Personal details
- Born: Malawi
- Party: Democratic Progressive Party (Malawi)

Paul Chibingu is a Malawian politician and educator. He was the Minister of Home Affairs of Malawi, having been appointed to the position on 12 January 2013 by former president of Malawi Peter Mutharika. His term began on 23 June 2014.

In 2015 he was replaced. He became the Minister of Lands, Housing and Urban Development.

Awards and achievements
Preceded by	Minister of Home Affairs of Malawi	Succeeded by Atupele Muluzi
