= Harold Msusa =

Malawian public affairs and ICT executive

Secretary for Information and Communication Technology
- Incumbent
- Assumed office October 28, 2025
- President: Peter Mutharika

Personal details
- Education: Master of Science in Agricultural Sciences; Bachelor of Science in Agriculture
- Alma mater: University of Tsukuba; University of Malawi (Bunda College of Agriculture)
- Occupation: Public affairs executive ICT administrator
- Known for: Corporate affairs, sustainability, and leading digital transformation

Harold Msusa is a Malawian public affairs executive who was appointed Secretary for Information and Communication Technology by President Peter Mutharika on 28 October 2025. His past experience consists of work in corporate affairs, sustainability, and digital transformation.

== Education ==
Msusa obtained a Master of Science in Agricultural Sciences from the University of Tsukuba in Japan, and a Bachelor of Science in Agriculture from the University of Malawi’s Bunda College of Agriculture.

== Career ==
Before joining government, Msusa served as Director of Public Affairs, Communication and Sustainability at Coca-Cola Beverages Africa (Malawi), where he led corporate affairs and sustainability programmes.
