= Wictor =

Name list

Wictor is both a surname and a given name. Notable people with the name include:

- Pat Wictor (born 1966), American blues and folk musician, guitarist, singer-songwriter, and recording artist
- Wictor Esbensen (1881–1942), Norwegian mariner
- Wictor Sajeni, Malawian politician
