= Kingsely Namakhwa =

Malawian politician

Kingsely Sostins Namakhwa is a Malawian politician. He is the current Deputy Ministry of Agriculture, Irrigation and Water Development together with Deputy Minister Margaret Mauwa in the September 2011 Cabinet of Malawi under the Minister Peter Mwanza.

== Gay & Lesbian Rights ==
After the arrest of Steven Monjeza and Tiwonge Chimbalanga, as Deputy Information and Civic Education Minister, he called for gays to be open about their sexuality despite the fact they can be imprisoned for 14 years in Malawi.
