= Grace Chiumia =

Malawian politician

- Born: c. 1977 (age 48–49); Malawi
- Citizenship: Malawi
- Occupation: Politician
- Years active: 2009–2019
- Title: Minister of Home Civic Education in the Cabinet of Malawi

Grace Chiumia is a Malawian politician who served as Minister of Civic education in the Malawian cabinet from 24 October 2017 until 2019. Before that, she was the Minister of Home Affairs and Internal Security, in the Malawian cabinet, from 6 September 2016 until 24 October 2017.

== Career ==
Chiuma is a medical nurse and malaria coordinator from Mzuzu. She was elected to the National Assembly to represent the Nkhata Bay West district at the May 2009 election. She was given the nickname "Obama" in 2008 by the people of her constituency as the first woman to run to represent them. She successfully ran against eight men.

In 2010, Chiumia attended Voluntary Service Overseas's MP training in Pretoria to assist parliamentarians to be more articulate on issues around HIV and AIDS policy implementation.

Chiumia was appointed Minister of Sports and Culture in August 2015, She was appointed Minister of Home Affairs and Internal Security in President Peter Mutharika's cabinet in September 2016. She is the youngest minister in the Malawian cabinet. She is also the deputy government chief whip and deputy secretary general of the ruling Democratic Progressive Party.

In November 2016, Chiumia faced demonstrations from Karonga residents over the reallocation of the Dzaleka refugee camp to Katili.

Chiumia did not run in the 2019 election, but her husband was elected as the member for Mzimba Luwelezi Constituency.

== Personal life ==
Chiumia was widowed in 2004. After meeting Reverend Fred Garry from Watertown First Presbyterian Church in New York State, she helped start the Women of Grace Widows' Fund. She also has a daughter. She married Sam Chirwa in July 2011. As of 2024, her husband was caring for her at home due to a chronic illness.
