= Elizabeth Aipira =

Malawian politician

Deputy Minister of Agriculture, Irrigation and Food Security of Malawi
- In office 23 February 2005 – 14 June 2013
- President: Bingu wa Mutharika

Personal details
- Born: Malawi
- Party: Democratic Progressive Party (Malawi)

Elizabeth Aipira is a Malawian politician and educator. She was the former deputy minister of Agriculture, Irrigation and Food Security in Malawi, having been appointed to the position in early 2005 by the former president of Malawi, Bingu wa Mutharika. Her term began on 20 February 2005.

== Legacy ==
The book "Elizabeth Aipira: a life of service to the nation" was published in 2009. The book was by O. Aipira.

Awards and achievements
Preceded by	Deputy Minister of Agriculture, Irrigation and Food Security of Malawi	Succeeded by
