= Ernest Malenga =

Malawian politician

Minister of Home affairs and internal security of Malawi
- In office 20 November 2007 – 14 June 2012
- President: Bingu wa Mutharika

Personal details
- Died: 30 November 2020 Liwonde, Malawi
- Party: Democratic Progressive Party (Malawi)

Ernest Malenga (died 20 November 2020) was a Malawian politician and educator. He was the former Minister of Agriculture and Irrigation in Malawi, having been appointed to the position in early 2007 by the former president of Malawi, Bingu wa Mutharika. His term began on 20 November 2007. Malenga also served in the National Assembly representing Balaka West.

Malenga died on 30 November 2020 in Liwonde.

Awards and achievements
Preceded by	Minister of Home affairs and internal security of Malawi	Succeeded by
