= Timothy Mtambo =

Malawian Minister

- Education: University of Pavia
- Occupations: Minister of Civic Education and National Unity
- Years active: 2020-2023
- Employer: Malawian Government

Timothy Mtambo (born 12 August 1984) of Chitipa is a Malawian politician and serves as Minister of Civic Education and National Unity in Malawi government since 2020. Prior to active politics, Mtambo was a human rights activist. He is mostly known for the role he played by leading demonstrations against the regime of President Peter Mutharika, accusing the regime of nepotism and corruption. Mtambo also holds the position of Commander in Chief of Citizen for Transformation Movement (CFT).

== Early life and education ==
Timothy Mtambo born on 12 August 1984 in Chitipa, a district in northern Malawi bordering the Republic of Tanzania. A Lambya by tribe, his parents are of royal lineage. His father is Osky Chabipilabatambo Milembo Mtambo

He earned a Bachelor of Arts Degree at the Chancellor College, a constituent college of the University of Malawi and later, a Master’s Degree in International Cooperation and Development at the University of Pavia, in Italy.

== Entry into national activism ==
After graduating from the University of Malawi in 2010, Mtambo joined the Blantyre Child Justice Court as a social worker before moving to the Center for Human Rights and Rehabilitation(CHRR), a leading human rights organization in Malawi, as Programs Manager. In 2012, he was appointed Executive Director of the CHRR and later became the Chairperson of the Human Rights Defenders Coalition (HRDC).

During his time as leader of HRDC he led Malawian citizens in protests to demand electoral justice and accountability which led to the nullification of the 2019 presidential elections in Malawi. During this period he was arrested by the police, his home and offices were fire-bombed and he was shot at while driving his car in Lilongwe, the country’s capital.

== Political career ==
On 3 February 2020, the High Court, sitting as the Constitutional Court, nullified the 21 May 2019 disputed presidential election result. The Malawi Electoral Commission (MEC) had declared President Peter Mutharika the narrow winner of the 2019 Malawian general election with 38.57% of votes, followed by Lazarus Chakwera with 35.41% and former Vice President Saulos Chilima third with 20.24% .

On 1 April 2020, Timothy Mtambo resigned from NGO-based human rights activism at the HRDC and from his position at CHRR to form a political outfit called the Citizens For Transformation (CFT), described as a “People Power Movement”.

During the announcement of the formation of the CFT, Mtambo out rightly endorsed the Malawi Congress Party (MCP) and UTM Party electoral alliance, which had just been formed to contest against the DPP in the court-ordered fresh election

In the fresh election of June 23, 2020, opposition leader Lazarus Chakwera of the MCP-UTM Alliance defeated incumbent Peter Mutharika of the DPP with 58.57% of the vote to become the sixth president of Malawi

On 8 July 2020, Timothy Mtambo was appointed Minister of Civic Education and National Unity by President Lazarus Chakwera, becoming the youngest member of the cabinet at the age of 36.
