= David Mphande =

Malawian politician

Minister of Health of Malawi
- In office 9 August 2010 – 8 March 2015
- President: Bingu wa Mutharika

Personal details
- Born: 1938
- Died: 14 September 2018 (aged 79–80) Lilongwe, Malawi
- Party: Democratic Progressive Party (Malawi)

David Mphande (1938 – 14 September 2018) was a Malawian politician and educator. He was the former Minister of Health in Malawi, having been appointed to the position in early 2010 by the former president of Malawi, Bingu wa Mutharika. His term began on 9 August 2010.

He died on 14 September 2018 in Lilongwe.

Awards and achievements
Preceded by	Minister of Health of Malawi	Succeeded by
