= Flamenga Chelewani =

Malawian politician

Deputy Minister of Natural Resources, Energy and Environment Affairs of Malawi
- In office September 8 2011 – 8 June 2017
- President: Bingu wa Mutharika

Personal details
- Born: Malawi
- Party: Democratic Progressive Party (Malawi)

Flamenga Chelewani is a Malawian politician and educator. He was the former Deputy Minister of Natural Resources, Energy and Environment Affairs in Malawi, having been appointed to the position in early 2011 by the former president of Malawi, Bingu wa Mutharika. His term began on 19 August 2011.

Awards and achievements
Preceded by	Deputy Minister of Natural Resources, Energy and Environment Affairs of Malawi	Succeeded by
