= Grey Malunga =

Malawian politician

Minister of Natural Resources and Energy of Malawi
- In office 15 June 2009 – 8 July 2016
- President: Bingu wa Mutharika

Personal details
- Born: Malawi
- Party: Democratic Progressive Party (Malawi)

Grey Malunga is a Malawian politician and educator. He was the former Minister of Natural Resources and Energy in Malawi, having been appointed to the position in early 2009 by the former president of Malawi, Bingu wa Mutharika. His term began on 15 June 2009.

Awards and achievements
Preceded by	Minister of Natural Resources and Energy of Malawi	Succeeded by
