= Grenenger Msulira Banda =

Malawian politician

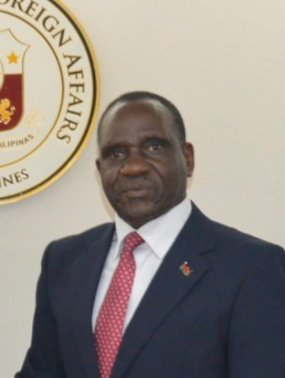

Deputy Minister of Irrigation and Water Development of Malawi
- In office 9 August 2010 – 8 March 2015
- President: Bingu wa Mutharika

Personal details
- Born: c.1954 Malawi
- Party: Democratic Progressive Party (Malawi)

Grenenger Msulira Banda (born c.1954) is a Malawian politician and educator.

== Life ==
Banda retired in 2004 from Forestry but found himself re-employed by the University of Malawi to teach forest engineering.

Banda was elected in 2009 as a Member of Parliament for the Kasungu constituency. He became the Deputy Minister of Irrigation and Water Development in Malawi, having been appointed to the position in early 2010 by the former president of Malawi, Bingu wa Mutharika. His term began on 9 August 2010.

In 2016, he started five years as the country's Ambassador to Japan and several South Pacific islands. He presented his credentials in the Philippines in 2019.

Awards and achievements
Preceded by	Deputy Minister of Irrigation and Water Development of Malawi	Succeeded by
