= Richie Muheya =

Malawian politician

Minister of Irrigation and Water Development of Malawi
- In office 9 August 2010 – 8 March 2015
- President: Bingu wa Mutharika

Personal details
- Born: Malawi
- Party: Democratic Progressive Party (Malawi)

Richie Muheya is a Malawian politician and educator. He was the former Minister of Irrigation and Water Development in Malawi, having been appointed to the position in early 2010 by the former president of Malawi Bingu wa Mutharika. His term began on 9 August 2010.

Awards and achievements
| Preceded by | Minister of Irrigation and Water Development of Malawi | Succeeded by |
