= Martin Kansichi =

Malawian politician

Minister of Trade and Private Sector Development of Malawi
- In office 23 February 2005 – 14 June 2013
- President: Bingu wa Mutharika

Personal details
- Born: Malawi
- Party: Democratic Progressive Party (Malawi)

Martin Kansichi is a Malawian politician and educator. He was the former Minister of Trade and Private Sector Development in Malawi, having been appointed to the position in early 2005 by the former president of Malawi, Bingu wa Mutharika. His term began on 20 February 2005.

Awards and achievements
Preceded by	Minister of Trade and Private Sector Development of Malawi	Succeeded by
