= James Nyondo =

James Mbowe Nyondo (14 May 1968 – 17 July 2015) was a Malawian lawyer, development worker, and presidential candidate. He was born in Chitipa, Malawi.

== Education ==
Nyondo attended Chancellor College, Zomba, where he reversed his outspoken opposition to Christianity. He subsequently moved to South Africa where he completed a degree in law. While in South Africa, he was mentored by Apostles Theo and Beverly Wolmarans. Dr Theo Wolmarans subsequently sponsored him to earn a business degree from the University of Texas at San Antonio and has continued to support him in his leadership development.

In 2006, Nyondo completed his studies in the US and moved back to Malawi to launch an effort he called Servants of the Nation with the goal of mentoring local leaders to address the problems of their own people.

== Presidential campaign ==
Nyondo submitted his nomination papers on 4 February 2009 to run as an independent candidate in Malawi's 19 May 2009 presidential and parliamentary elections. He says that he has sponsored over 120 independent parliamentary candidates by paying their MK 100,000 (US$700) nomination fee. He is the only independent candidate in the 2009 presidential election and has campaigned on the need for a new generation of leadership, a smaller cabinet, an end to the personal extravagance of current and previous governments, and an end to regional and tribal discrimination in the national government. He died of lung cancer in Johannesburg, South Africa on 17 July 2015.
