= Jaffalie Mussa =

Malawian politician

Jaffali Mussa

Minister of Housing and Urban Development
- In office 2007–2009
- President: Bingu Wa Mutharika
- Vice President: Dr. Joyce Banda
- Vice President: Dr. Joyce Banda

Minister of Youth, Sports and Culture
- President: Bingu Wa Mutharika

Personal details
- Born: Malawi
- Party: Democratic Progressive Party (Malawi)

Jaffali Mussa is a Malawian politician and educator. He is a former Cabinet Minister and diplomat in Malawi, having been appointed to the position in August 2004 by the former president of Malawi, Bingu Wa Mutharika. His term began in August 2004. He also served as Malawi Ambassador to Egypt and Kuwait. In 2014, he contested in Machinga East on a Democratic Progressive Party (DPP) ticket, but he lost the seat.

Awards and achievements
Preceded by	Minister of Local Government and Rural Development of Malawi	Succeeded by
