= Jappie Mhango =

Malawian politician

Deputy Minister of Defence of Malawi
- In office 19 June 2014 – 12 September 2019
- President: Peter Mutharika

Personal details
- Born: Malawi
- Party: Democratic Progressive Party (Malawi)

Jappie Mhango is a Malawian politician and educator. He was the Deputy Minister of Defence of Malawi, having been appointed to the position in 2014 by former president of Malawi Peter Mutharika. His term began on 23 June 2014.

Awards and achievements
Preceded by	Deputy Minister of Defence of Malawi	Succeeded by
