= Steven Stanford Kamwendo =

Malawian politician

Deputy Minister of Industry and Trade of Malawi
- In office 15 June 2009 – 8 July 2016
- President: Bingu wa Mutharika

Personal details
- Born: Malawi
- Party: Democratic Progressive Party (Malawi)

Steven Stanford Kamwendo is a Malawian politician and educator. He was the former Deputy Minister of Industry and Trade in Malawi, having been appointed to the position in early 2009 by the former president of Malawi, Bingu wa Mutharika. His term began on 15 June 2009.

Awards and achievements
Preceded by	Deputy Minister of Industry and Trade of Malawi	Succeeded by
