= Shadreck Jonas =

Malawian politician

Deputy Minister of Industry and Trade of Malawi
- In office 9 August 2010 – 8 March 2015
- President: Bingu wa Mutharika

Personal details
- Born: Malawi
- Party: Democratic Progressive Party (Malawi)

Shadreck Jonas is a Malawian politician and educator. He was the former Deputy Minister of Industry and Trade in Malawi, having been appointed to the position in early 2010 by the former president of Malawi, Bingu wa Mutharika. His term began on 9 August 2010.

Awards and achievements
Preceded by	Deputy Minister of Industry and Trade of Malawi	Succeeded by
