= Davies Katsonga =

Malawian politician

Minister of Presidential and parliamentary affairs of Malawi
- In office 20 November 2007 – 14 June 2012
- President: Bingu wa Mutharika

Personal details
- Born: Malawi
- Party: Democratic Progressive Party (Malawi)

Davies Katsonga is a Malawian politician and educator. He was the former Minister of Presidential and parliamentary affairs in Malawi, having been appointed to the position in early 2007 by the former president of Malawi, Bingu wa Mutharika. His term began on 20 November 2007.

Awards and achievements
| Preceded by | Minister of Presidential and parliamentary affairs of Malawi | Succeeded by |
