= Ted Kalebe =

Malawian politician

Minister of Economic planning and development of Malawi
- In office 20 November 2007 – 14 June 2012
- President: Bingu wa Mutharika

Personal details
- Born: Malawi
- Party: Democratic Progressive Party (Malawi)

Ted Kalebe is a Malawian politician and educator. He was the former Minister of Economic planning and development in Malawi, having been appointed to the position in early 2007 by the former president of Malawi, Bingu wa Mutharika. His term began on 20 November 2007.

Awards and achievements
Preceded by	Minister of Economic planning and development of Malawi	Succeeded by
