= Vuwa Symon Kaunda =

Malawian politician

Minister of Information and Civic Education of Malawi
- In office 9 August 2010 – 8 March 2015
- President: Bingu wa Mutharika

Personal details
- Born: Malawi
- Party: Democratic Progressive Party (Malawi)

Vuwa Symon Kaunda is a Malawian politician and educator. He was the former Minister of Information and Civic Education in Malawi, having been appointed to the position in early 2010 by the former president of Malawi, Bingu wa Mutharika. His term began on 9 August 2010.

Awards and achievements
Preceded by	Minister of Information and Civic Education of Malawi	Succeeded by
