= Felton Mulli =

Malawian politician

Deputy Minister of Health of Malawi
- In office 9 August 2010 – 8 March 2015
- President: Bingu wa Mutharika

Personal details
- Born: Malawi
- Party: Democratic Progressive Party (Malawi)

Felton Mulli is a Malawian politician and educator. He was the former Deputy Minister of Health in Malawi, having been appointed to the position in early 2010 by the former president of Malawi, Bingu wa Mutharika. His term began on 9 August 2010.

Awards and achievements
Preceded by	Deputy Minister of Health of Malawi	Succeeded by
