= Khumbo Kachali =

Vice President of Malawi from 2012 to 2014

Rt. Hon. Khumbo Kachali MP
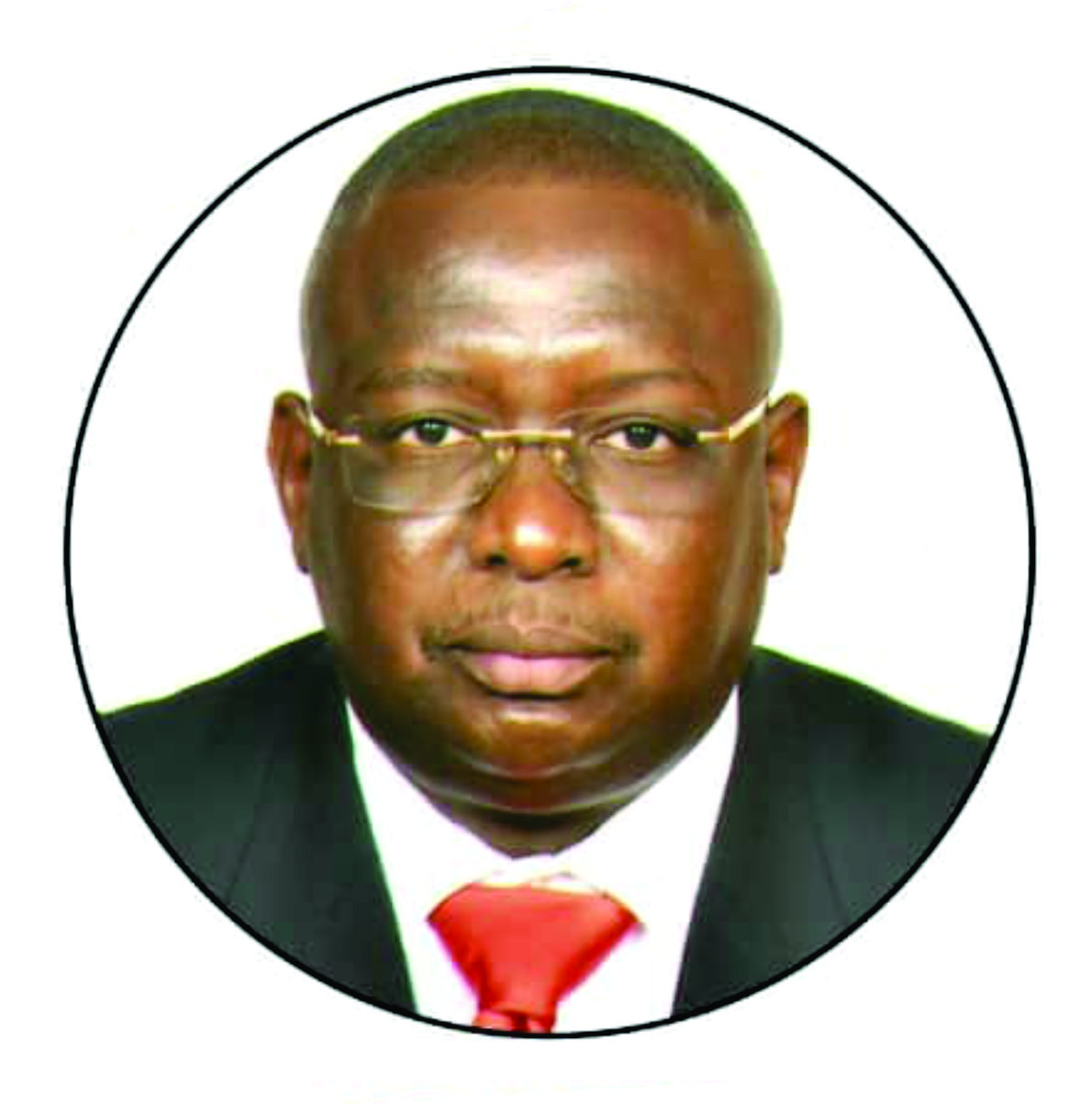

Vice President of Malawi
- In office 13 April 2012 – 31 May 2014
- President: Joyce Banda
- Preceded by: Joyce Banda
- Succeeded by: Saulos Chilima

Minister of Transport
- In office 15 June 2010 – 10 August 2010
- President: Bingu wa Mutharika
- Preceded by: Henry Mussa
- Succeeded by: Sidik Mia

Member of Parliament for Mzimba (South-West)
- Incumbent
- Assumed office 19 May 2004

Personal details
- Born: 1966 (age 59–60)
- Party: United Democratic Front (Before 2004); Democratic Progressive Party (2004–2010); People's Party (2011–present)
- Education: University of Cambridge University of Derby
- Profession: Politician

Khumbo Hasting Kachali is a Malawian politician who was Vice President of Malawi from April 2012 to May 2014, serving under President Joyce Banda. He is the first vice president from the Northern Region of Malawi. The three previous vice presidents came from the central and southern regions. Kachali previously held a number of cabinet positions between 2004 and 2010.

== Early life and education ==
Khumbo Kachali was born in 1966 and attended Phwezi Secondary School. He subsequently obtained a Diploma in Project Management from the University of Cambridge, England. He obtained his Master of Science Degree in Strategic Management in 2011 from the University of Derby. For his MSc thesis, he wrote a paper titled the Impact of Multiparty Politics on the socio-economic lives of people using his Mzimba constituency as a case study.

Kachali was Second Vice-President for the Malawi Chamber of Commerce and Industry and he has been a businessman for years in Mzuzu and large farming enterprise in Mzimba, his home district.

== Political career ==
Kachali was treasurer general for the United Democratic Front (UDF) from 2002 to 2004. Kachali was elected to parliament in May 2004. In 2005 he was appointed as second vice-president of the Democratic Progressive Party (DPP). He was Minister of Industry, Science & Technology (2004-2006), Deputy Minister for Home Affairs & Internal Security (2006-2007) and Minister of Youth Development & Sports (2007-2008). From 2008 until 2009 he was Minister of Health. He is credited to have been one of very few effective health ministers, bringing together all health sector partners to provide quality services. As vice president, he would later use this experience as minister of health to quell a health staff boycott over allowances at Kamuzu Central Hospital in June 2012.

Kachali was appointed Minister of Transport and Public Infrastructure in the cabinet that became effective on 15 June 2009. He lost his ministerial position in the cabinet shake-up of 9 August 2010. The PP won his former constituency with a majority of over 5000 sending his detractors into political wilderness.

He represented Malawi at the African Union summit in the year 2012 where he helped the election of the first female AU Chairperson Nkosazana Dlamini-Zuma. He was Banda's vocal face on the banning of Sudan's fugitive president Al Bashir from attending the initially Malawi bound 2012 AU summit.

Kachali became the president and founding member of the Freedom Party, which was registered with the Registrar of Political parties in Malawi in 2017.

In the 2025 election, Joyce Banda and Kachali ran again for the Presidency and vice-President. They represented a coalition which included the People's Party.
