= Henry Mussa =

Malawian politician

Honourable Henry Mussa MP
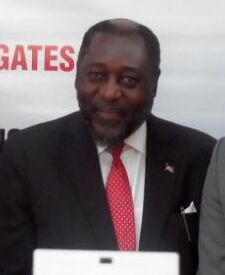

Minister of Labour
- In office 19 June 2014 – 21 May 2019
- President: Peter Mutharika

Member of Parliament for Chiradzulu East
- In office 1999–2019

Personal details
- Party: Democratic Progressive Party

Henry Mussa was a Member of Parliament for Chiradzulu District Malawi. He also served as Deputy Agriculture Minister. He was also an MP for Chiradzulu East under a Democratic Progressive Party Ticket.

== Midnight Six ==
He was a part of the "Midnight six", a group of Malawians that have allegedly plotted a constitutional coup after the death of President Bingu wa Mutharika. He was also the funeral chair of wa Mutharika's funeral.

== Arrest and conviction ==
In October 2022, Mussa, along with the culprit Gedion Munthali, appeared in court for charges of conspiracy to commit a felony, theft by a public servant, and receiving stolen items, in relation to the disappearance of 10 computers and a genset.

The computers were donated by the Malawi Communications Regulatory Authority (Macra) to the ministry for use by journalists at the Malawi News Agency.

Director of Public Prosecution (DPP) Steven Kayuni said of the crime:

“Conversion of public property for personal use should be abhorred by all duty bearers. It is sabotage of the highest order and an economic crime to take home computers and gensets that would otherwise have been useful to the promotion of government ideals,”

The matter adjourned to a later date for sentencing.
