= Otria Moyo Jere =

Malawian politician (born 1959)

Otria Moyo Jere (born 1959) is a politician who was appointed Deputy Minister of Education, Science and Technology in the cabinet of Malawi in June 2009.

Otria Moyo Jere was born in 1959. She attended the University of Malawi, Chancellor College, graduating in 1985 with a Bachelor of Education degree. From 1985 to 1999 she was a school teacher and headmistress. In 1999 she became a subject officer with the Malawi National Examinations Board. She returned to Chancellor College, obtaining a master's degree in 2007 in Education Testing, Measurement and Evaluation. Jere owns a poultry and farming business, and owns rental properties in Blantyre.

Jere became active in politics in 2007. in the May 2009 elections she was elected MP for Kasungu West Constituency on the Democratic Progressive Party platform. In the cabinet that became effective on 15 June 2009, she was appointed Deputy Minister of Education, responsible for Higher Education, Science & Technology. She retained this post in the cabinet shuffle of 9 August 2010.
