= Daniel Liwimbi =

Businessman and politician

Daniel Symphoriana Liwimbi is a businessman and politician who was appointed a minister in the cabinet of Malawi in June 2009.

== Biography ==
Liwimbi was General Manager of the privately owned Ethanol Company of Malawi (ETHCO), which makes Ethanol from sugar cane. In October 2007, his company and Malawi's department of Science and Technology jointly unveiled the first set of imported Brazilian-made 'flex-fuel' vehicles in a ceremony in Blantyre. In December 2007, Liwimbi said: "Government should plan to increase production if the whole project is to be a success. With increased production from sugarcane molasses, capacity could reach up to 30 million litres per [cane-growing] season".

Liwimbi was elected for Nkhotakota North-East in the May 2009 elections, on the Democratic Progressive Party platform. He was appointed Deputy Minister of Development Planning and Cooperation in the cabinet sworn in on 15 June 2009. He retained this position through the cabinet reshuffle of 9 August 2010. In August 2010, Liwimbi stated that 40% of Malawi's grain was lost in the post-harvest period, and announced government plans to construct grain silos in Mzuzu with capacity for 25 thousand metric tonnes of grain.
