= Theresa Gloria Mwale =

Member of Parliament and Cabinet minister

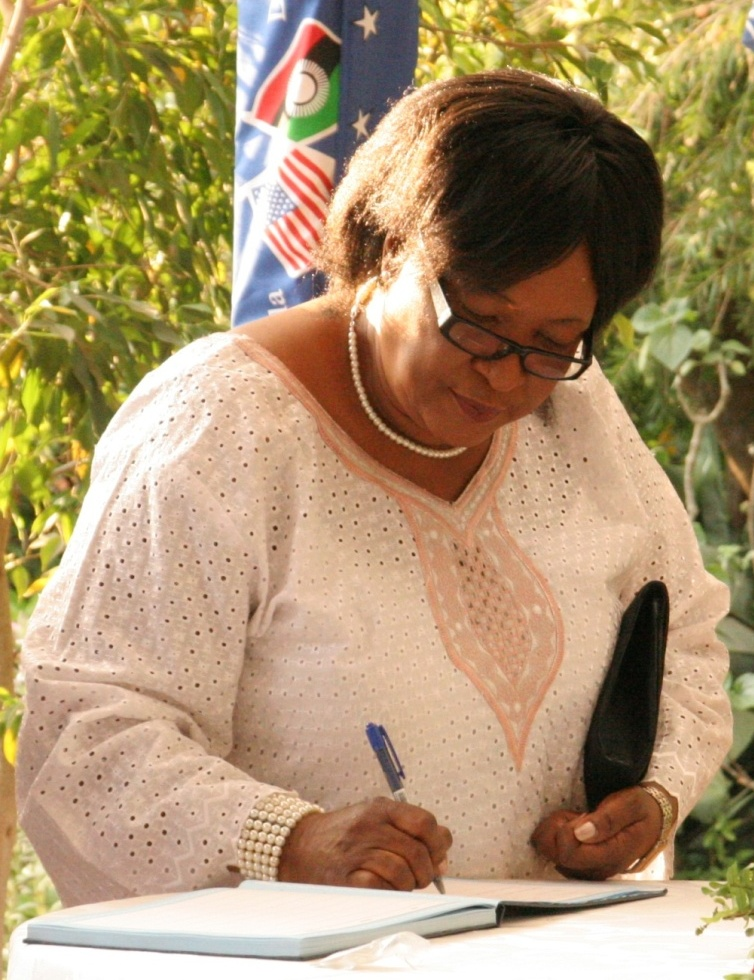
- Mwale in 2011

Member of Parliament
- In office 2009–2014
- Constituency: Mchinji West

Personal details
- Born: 1947 (age 78–79) Malawi
- Occupation: Nurse, politician

Theresa Gloria Mwale (born 1947) is a nurse who entered politics in Malawi, and was appointed Deputy Minister of Health in 2009.

== Life ==
Theresa Gloria Mwale was born in 1947, and gained an MSc in Nursing Education and Management. From 1973 to 1976 she worked as a nurse and manager in hospitals in the Nkhatabay and Chikhwawa districts. From 1976 to 1987 she was a teacher at Zomba School of Nursing and Kamuzu College of Nursing (now part of Kamuzu University of Health Sciences). Between 1987 and 2008, Mwale was a Health Advisor for Reproductive Women and New-Born Babies for the World Health Organization.

Mwale was elected Member of Parliament for the Mchinji West Constituency on a Democratic Progressive Party (DPP) ticket on 19 May 2009. She was appointed Deputy Minister of Health in the cabinet that became effective on 15 June 2009. After the Cabinet reshuffle of 9 August 2010, she was appointed Minister of Gender, Child & Community Development.

In August 2013 she was reported to be introduced to the Malawi Congress Party (MCP) by John Tembo. Mwale and Christina Chiwoko who was the MP for the Lilongwe Mapuyu North Constituency were said to be new members.

Mwale sought reelection in 2014 as an independent candidate, but was unseated by Billy Kanjira Banda of the Malawi Congress Party. She later contested the MCP primaries for the 2016 Mchinji West by-election.
