= Khumbo Chirwa =

Malawian politician

Minister of Industry, Science and Technology of Malawi
- In office 6 June 2004 – 8 March 2009
- President: Bakili Muluzi

Personal details
- Born: Malawi
- Party: United Democratic Front (Malawi)

Khumbo Chirwa is a Malawian politician and educator. He was the former Minister of Industry, Science and Technology in Malawi, having been appointed to the position in early 2004 by the former president of Malawi Bakili Muluzi. His term began in June 2004.

Awards and achievements
Preceded by	Minister of Industry, Science and Technology of Malawi	Succeeded by
