= Leckford Mwanza Thotho =

Malawian politician

Leckford Mwanza Thotho is a politician who served as Minister of Information and then Minister of Defense in Malawi between 2009 and 2011.

Thotho ran on the Democratic Progressive Party ticket in the May 2009 elections, and was elected MP for Dowa North East. Thotho was appointed Minister of Information and Civil Education, with Kingsley Namakwa as his deputy, in the cabinet that became effective on 15 June 2009.

In March 2010, the Scottish government announced that they would suspend aid to organizations in Malawi that discriminated against gays. Thotho responded by saying "We may be poor but money will not force us to legalise these acts of immorality because we are not such a society and we have more pressing human rights abuses that we need to pay attention to than gay rights". This followed the conviction of a same-sex couple for gross indecency after they held a symbolic same-sex marriage. Thotho defended the decision on the basis of customary Malawian morality. He compared the ban on same-sex marriage in Malawi to that on polygamous marriage in the United States.

In March 2010, Thotho defended a decision to purchase a presidential jet for US$13.26 million, saying purchase was cheaper than rental. The opposition called the decision irresponsible given the poverty of the people of Malawi. In July 2010, Thotho commissioned a K77 million multi-purpose community Tele-Center in Mzanza. The center would give rural people access to the internet. Thotho caused controversy during his term as Minister of Information with his campaign to change the national flag of Malawi.

Thotho was appointed Minister of Defense in a cabinet reshuffle announced on 9 August 2010. On 10 January 2011, Thotho was dropped from his position as Minister of Defense. Although no official reason was given, newspapers speculated that the cause was his decision to purchase arms from the United Kingdom, as recommended by the Army, rather than from China, as preferred by President Bingu wa Mutharika. Another reason could have been that he apologized to the government of Mozambique for the action of Colonel James Kalipinde in sailing on prohibited waters of Mozambique. After the firing, the President assumed direct responsibility for the Ministry of Defense.
