= McJones Shaba =

Malawian politician

McJones Shaba is a Malawian politician. He was Malawi's Deputy Minister of Transport and Public Infrastructure in 2010. He has also been involved in public and agricultural works in the country and the National Forestry Plan.
