= Sidik Mia =

Malawian politician (1965–2021)

Honorable Mohammed Sidik Mia
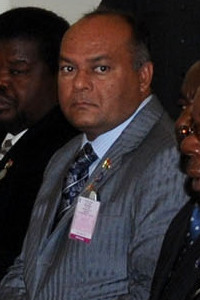
- Sidik Mia in 2010

Minister of Transport and Public Works
- In office 28 June 2020 – 12 January 2021
- President: Lazarus Chakwera
- Preceded by: Ralph Jooma
- In office August 2010 – January 2014
- President: Bingu wa Mutharika; Joyce Banda

Minister of Defence
- In office June 2009 – August 2010
- President: Bingu wa Mutharika

Minister of Irrigation and Water Development
- In office September 2005 – March 2009
- President: Bingu wa Mutharika

Deputy Minister of Transport and Public Works
- In office 2005–2005
- President: Bingu wa Mutharika

Deputy Minister of Mines, Natural Resources and Environment
- In office 2005–2005
- President: Bingu wa Mutharika

Deputy Minister of Agriculture, Irrigation and Food Security
- In office 2004–2005
- President: Bingu wa Mutharika

Member of Parliament from Chikwawa-Nkombezi
- In office May 2004 – January 2021

Personal details
- Born: Mohammed Sidik Mia; 4 March 1965
- Died: 12 January 2021 (aged 55) Lilongwe, Malawi
- Party: Democratic Progressive Party (2005); United Democratic Front (Malawi)
- Spouse: Abida Mia

Sidik Mia (4 March 1965 – 12 January 2021) was a Malawian businessman, politician, and Member of Parliament who held various ministerial positions within the Cabinet of Malawi beginning in 2004, serving as Minister of Transport and Public Works since June 2020. He was the Deputy President of the Malawi Congress Party (MCP) until his death due to COVID-19 related illness on 12 January 2021 during the COVID-19 pandemic in Malawi. He stood as the vice presidential running mate to Dr. Lazarus Chakwera in the 2019 Malawian general election.

== Early life ==
Sidik Mia was born in 1965 in Chikwawa. He went on to obtain a diploma in Business Management. Upon completion, he subsequently established a number of businesses within Malawi and built a network of wealthy business partners who he would later on persuade to become major donors to the Democratic Progressive Party.

Sidik Mia's Father, Abdul Wahab Sidik Mia was born in Nsanje, Marka. Business tycoon and philanthropist, he had been influential in the politics of Nyasaland and later on Malawi (mostly in the lower shire and later on nationwide).

== Political life ==
Sidik Mia was elected a Member of Parliament for Chikwawa-Nkombedzi constituency in May 2004 in Malawi's southern district of Chikwawa and was appointed Deputy Minister of Agriculture, Irrigation and Food Security in June 2004. In 2005 he was in turn Deputy Minister of Mines, Natural Resources and Environment, Deputy Minister of Transport and Public works and Minister of irrigation and Water Development. He held this last position from September 2005 until March 2009. Mia was reelected in the May 2009 general elections on the Democratic Progressive Party ticket. In the cabinet that became effective on 15 June 2009, he was appointed Minister of National Defense. After the cabinet reshuffle of 9 August 2010, he became Minister of Transport and Public Infrastructure.

Following the death of President Bingu wa Mutharika and succession of Joyce Banda, Sidik Mia along with 18 other colleagues of the Democratic Progressive Party announced they were to support Joyce Banda as President of the Republic. This followed the constitutional crisis in which the National Governing Council of the Democratic Progress Party, of which Mia was a senior member, had resolved to contend to the Supreme Court that Joyce Banda was ineligible to succeed Mutharika as President.

In January 2014 Sidik Mia resigned from the People's Party (PP) and from his cabinet post as Minister for Transport. He joined the Malawi Congress Party in 2017 and became the presidential running mate to its leader, Lazarus Chakwera.

== Personal life ==
In 2018 Mia refuted claims that he had converted from Islam to Christianity after he visited a church. He died on 12 January 2021 from COVID-19. He was laid to rest at his home in Nsanje. He is survived by his wife, MP Abida Mia.
