= Grain Malunga =

Malawian politician

Grain Malunga served as a Member of Parliament for Chikwawa North Constituency between May 2009 and May 2014. He served as Minister of Natural Resources, Energy and Environment in Malawi from June 2009 to August 2011. He was Principal Secretary for Ministry of Irrigation and Water Development, from August 2005 to January 2007, after serving as Secretary for Industry Science and Technology from August 2004 to August 2005.

He is a member of several professional bodies. He is a Fellow of the Institute of Materials, Minerals and Mining (No. 49933), Member of the National Geographic Society (No. 404353062), United States, He is a founding member of Geological Society of Malawi and served as Secretary General from 1999 to 2001 and Vice President from 2001 to 2003.

In the cabinet, he served as chairperson for Cabinet Committee on Natural Resources, Energy and Environment and a member of Cabinet Committees on “Economy and Public Sector Reforms”, “Local Government and Rural Transformation” and “Agriculture and Food Security”.

In the Parliament, he served as Chairperson for Commerce, Industry and Tourism and member of parliamentary committees on “Transport and Public Works” and “Defence and Security”.

Grain wrote two books titled “Earth Science and Human Geography for Malawi” ISBN 99908-911-9-2 in 2013 and “An Analysis of Mineral Resources of Malawi” ISBN 978-99908-950-0-1 in 2014.
