= Anna Kachikho =

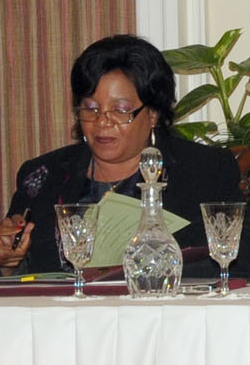
Image of Anna Kachikho

Anna Andrew Namathanga Kachikho (born 17 April 1955) is a politician who has held various cabinet positions in the government of Malawi.

== Life ==
Kachikho was born on 17 April 1955 in Mkoko village in Phalombe, southern Malawi. She obtained a certificate in secretarial studies from the Malawi Polytechnic and a BA Degree in Human Resources Development from Mobile University, Canada. She held various senior positions in the Agricultural Development and Marketing Corporation. She rose to become the Organizations Administrative Manager. Starting in 1988, Kachikho became active in Women’s Groups in the Malawi Congress Party. From 2000 to 2004, Kachikho was a Ward Councilor for Limbe East and Deputy Mayor of the Blantyre City Assembly.

Kachikho was elected a Member of Parliament for the Phalombe North constituency in 2004. She was appointed Deputy Minister of Education and Human Resources. In August 2005, she was appointed Minister of Home Affairs and Internal Security. Later positions were Minister of Education and Vocational Training (June 2006), Labor (May 2007) and Women and Child Development (February 2008). Kachikho was reelected in the 19 May 2009 General Elections. She was appointed Minister of Tourism, Wildlife on 15 June 2009 and Minister of Local Government and Rural Development on 9 August 2010.

In 2018, she was replaced as the Minister of Lands, Housing and Urban Planning by Jean Kalirani.

== Private life ==
Kachikho is a widow, and she has three children. She owns a farm where she grows maize and tobacco.
