= Mark Katsonga =

Malawian politician

Mark Katsonga Phiri
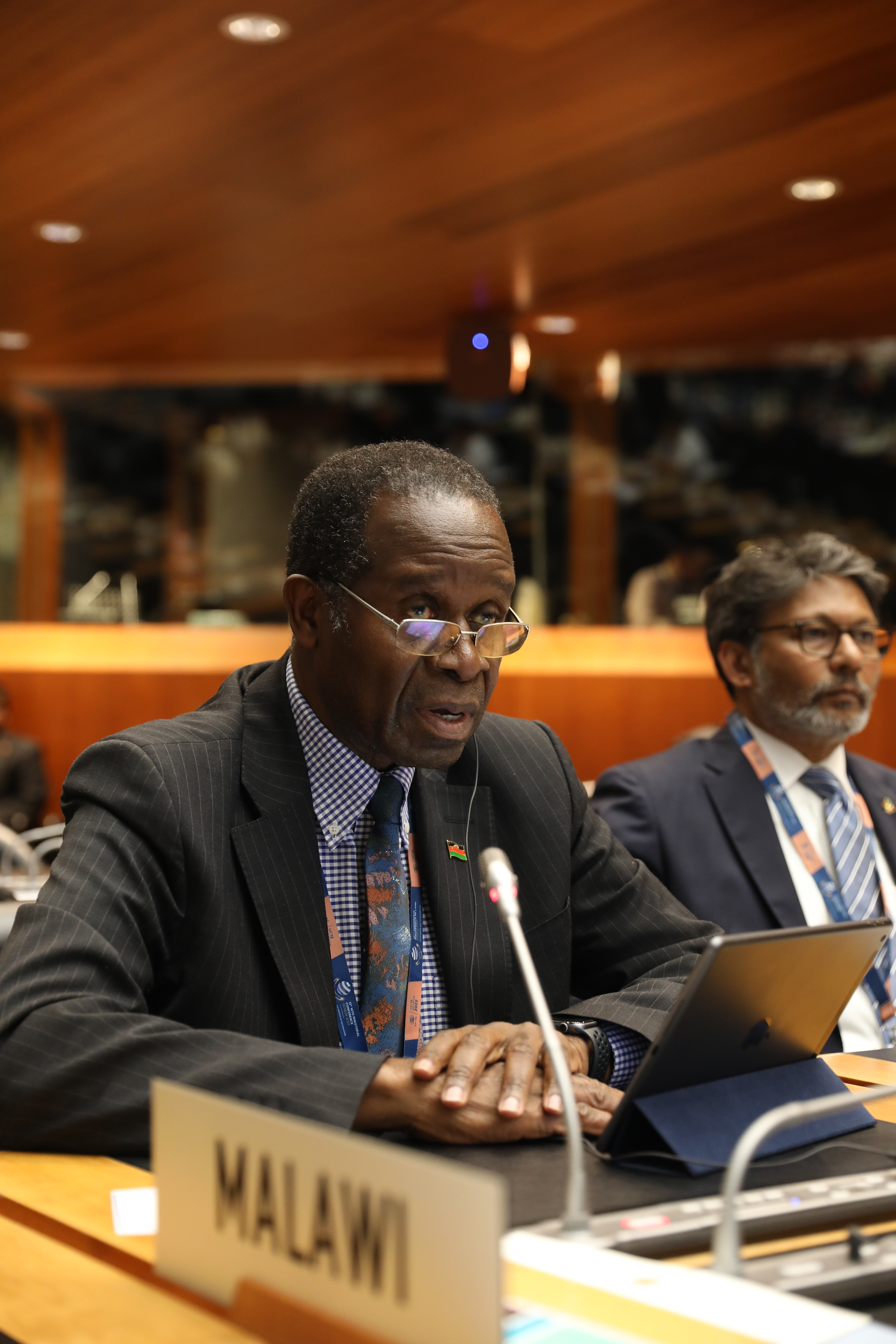

Minister of Trade and Industry of Malawi
- In office January 26, 2022 – January 31, 2023
- President: Lazarus Chakwera

Personal details
- Born: Malawi
- Party: Malawi Congress Party

Mark Katsonga Phiri is a Malawian politician and educator. He was the Minister of Trade and Industry in Malawi, until January 2023.

Awards and achievements
Preceded by	Ministry of Trade and Industry of Malawi	Succeeded by
