= Wictor Sajeni =

Malawian politician

Wictor B Songazaudzu Sajeni was born in Ntchisi, Malawi. He entered politics in 2009 as a member of Parliament for his home village, Ntchisi East, under the leadership of the late Bingu wa Mutharika. He served as an advisor to President Arthur Peter Mutharika from 2014 to 2019. He served previously as Deputy Minister of Primary Education, responsible for primary and secondary schools, from 2009 until the death of President Bingu wa Mutharika in 2012. Wictor Sajeni studied for his MA at Swansea University in Wales. During his time at university he completed work experience at The Foyer, a supported housing project for young people in Swansea.
