= David Faiti =

Malawian politician

Minister of Economic Planning and Development of Malawi
- In office 6 June 2004 – 8 March 2009
- President: Bakili Muluzi

Personal details
- Born: Malawi
- Party: United Democratic Front (Malawi)

David Faiti is a Malawian politician and educator. He was the former Minister of Agriculture and Irrigation in Malawi, having been appointed to the position in early 2004 by the former president of Malawi Bakili Muluzi. His term began in June 2004.

Awards and achievements
Preceded by	Minister of Economic Planning and Development of Malawi	Succeeded by
