= Roy Cumsay =

Malawian politician

Deputy Minister of Transport and Public Works of Malawi
- In office 6 June 2004 – 8 March 2009
- President: Bakili Muluzi

Personal details
- Born: Malawi
- Party: United Democratic Front (Malawi)

Roy Cumsay is a Malawian politician and educator. He was the former Deputy Minister of Transport and Public Works in Malawi, having been appointed to the position in early 2004 by the former president of Malawi Bakili Muluzi. His term began in June 2004.

Awards and achievements
Preceded by	Deputy Minister of Transport and Public Works of Malawi	Succeeded by
