= Henry Dama Phoya =

Malawian politician and jurist

Henry Dama Phoya is a former Member of Parliament for Malawi's Blantyre Rural East, Minister of Lands and Housing and Minister of Justice and Attorney General of Malawi.

He was kicked out of the Democratic Progressive Party (DPP) after opposing the "Injunctions Bill", which he said was a bad piece of legislation that would remove human rights and not protect the people. Phoya was also the chairperson for the National Assembly's Legal Affairs Committee (LAC); a post that went to Goodall Gondwe in August 2011.

He lost his seat in January 2014.
