= Eylin Kalonga =

Malawian politician

Deputy Minister of Industry, Science and Technology of Malawi
- In office 6 June 2004 – 8 March 2009
- President: Bakili Muluzi

Personal details
- Born: Malawi
- Party: United Democratic Front (Malawi)

Eylin Kalonga is a Malawian politician and educator. She was the former Deputy Minister of Industry, Science and Technology in Malawi, having been appointed to the position in early 2004 by the former president of Malawi Bakili Muluzi. Her term began in June 2004.

Awards and achievements
| Preceded by | Deputy Minister of Industry, Science and Technology of Malawi | Succeeded by |
