= Amjad Shawa =

Palestinian humanitarian and human rights advocate

Personal details
- Born: 24 April 1971 (age 54) Gaza, Palestine
- Children: Yasser, Yara, Sarah, Mohammed
- Education: Al-Quds Open University, Al-Quds University
- Occupation: Human rights activist, Journalist

Amjad Shawa (born April 24, 1971) is a Palestinian humanitarian and human rights advocate. He is recognized for his involvement in civil society and sustainable development efforts in Palestine. Shawa currently serves as the Deputy Commissioner-General of the Independent Commission for Human Rights (Ombudsman Office) and as the General Director of the Palestinian Non-Governmental Organizations Network (PNGO) in Gaza.

== Early life and education ==
Shawa received a Diploma in Teaching for Hearing-Impaired Individuals in 1991 and obtained a Bachelor's degree in Business Administration from Al-Quds Open University in 1995. He also holds a Master's degree in American Studies from Al-Quds University (2008). He has worked as a trainer in media, advocacy, and conflict transformation, training human rights workers and NGOs in Palestine and abroad.

== Professional career ==
Shawa began his career as a teacher for hearing-impaired individuals and later worked as a public relations coordinator at the Our Children for the Deaf Association from 1992 to 1996. He became a freelance journalist with the Jordanian News Agency in 1996 and was appointed Director of PNGO in 1999, overseeing over 140 NGOs in various sectors.

In 2007, he coordinated an international campaign to lift the siege on Gaza, advocating for an end to the blockade and promoting international support for Palestinian issues. In 2023, he was appointed Deputy Commissioner-General of the Independent Commission for Human Rights (Ombudsman Office) in Palestine.

Between 1998 and 2002, he was a coordinator for a Palestinian group affiliated with Amnesty International and served on a committee for the care of Palestinian children with disabilities from 1996 to 1998. He has also been the Deputy Chairman of the Board of Trustees for the Our Children for the Deaf Association since 2017.

Shawa has authored reports and publications on the humanitarian situation in Gaza, particularly regarding the impacts of the Israeli blockade. His work has appeared in various international outlets, including Monte Carlo Agency, Al-Dustour, and Youm7.

In October 2025, multiple media outlets reported that Shawa had been selected by Hamas and the Palestine Liberation Organization to head a technocratic committee tasked with overseeing governance and reconstruction efforts in the Gaza Strip.
