= Bob Khamisa =

Malawian politician

Minister Of Defence Of Malawi
- In office November 2007 – March 2009
- President: Bakili Muluzi

Personal details
- Born: Malawi
- Party: United Democratic Front (Malawi)

Bob Khamisa is a Malawian politician and educator. He was the former Deputy Minister of Mines, Natural Resources and Environment and Minister Of Defence in Malawi having been appointed to the position in early 2004 by the former president of Malawi Bakili Muluzi. His term began in June 2004.

Awards and achievements
Preceded by	Deputy Minister of Mines, Natural Resources and Environment of Malawi	Succeeded by
