= Nasrin Pillane =

Malawian politician

Nasrin Pillane (born in Balaka), is a Malawian politician. She was a Member of Parliament for Balaka West constituency in Malawi under the Democratic Progressive Party (DPP) ticket. In 2013 she announced that she was leaving the DPP to join the United Democratic Front (UDF).

The former first lady said that she would stand for parliament and she chose Pillane's constituency as an independent. Patricia Shanil Muluzi decided to use her birth name. In 2014, Dzimbiri was elected to the National Assembly of Malawi, representing Balaka West, as an independent candidate, defeating five other candidates for the seat. She was sworn into office on 9 June 2014 at the New Parliament Building in Lilongwe.
