= Margaret Roka Mauwa =

Margaret Roka Mauwa (born 1959) is an expert in agriculture who, in June 2009, became Deputy Minister of Agriculture and Food Security in the cabinet of Malawi.

== Life ==
Mauwa was born in 1959. She obtained a diploma in Agriculture from the University of Malawi, Bunda and an MSc in Agriculture Extension and Rural Development from the University of Reading, United Kingdom. She has spent most of her working career at the Ministry of Agriculture. Positions include Gender Officer and then Capacity Building Officer, Program Coordinator at Training Support Programme for Community Based, Natural Resources Management, Institutional and Human Development Manager at Training Support for Partners, and Social Development Specialist for a Microprojects Program run by the Government of Malawa with the European Union (2007–2009).

Mauwa joined the Democratic Progressive Party in 2005 and was elected a Member of Parliament for the Chiradzulu North District on 19 May 2009. She was appointed Deputy Minister of Agriculture and Food Security on 15 June 2009. President Bingu wa Mutharika acted as Minister of Agriculture. After the cabinet shuffle of 9 August 2010, she retained her position as Deputy Minister while Peter Mwanza was made Minister.
