= Abbie Shaba =

Malawian politician

Abbie Marambika Shaba is a politician who was appointed Minister of Development Planning and Cooperation in June 2009 in the cabinet of Malawi.

Abbie Shaba was born in 1958. He attended the University of Reading in the United Kingdom, where he obtained an MA degree in Rural Social Development. He worked in the Civil Service for many years, mainly in the Ministry of Gender, Youth and Community Services, rising to the position of Director of Social Planning. Between 2000 and 2004, he worked as a Program Manager for the Catholic Relief services.

Shaba was elected Member of Parliament for Mzimba East Constituency in May 2004. He was elected on the Republican Party ticket. On 15 June 2007 the Republican Party leader in Parliament, David Faiti, petitioned Speaker Louis Chimango to declare Shawa's seat and eight others vacant. His reason was that the MPs had joined the Democratic Progressive Party (DPP) by attending DPP caucuses and sitting on the government side in Parliament. Shaba was Deputy Leader of Government backbenchers from 2007 to 2009. He was reelected for Mzimba East in May 2009. He was appointed Minister of Development Planning and Cooperation on 15 June 2009. He retained this position in the reshuffled cabinet announced on 9 August 2010.
