= Ephraim Chiume =

Malawian politician

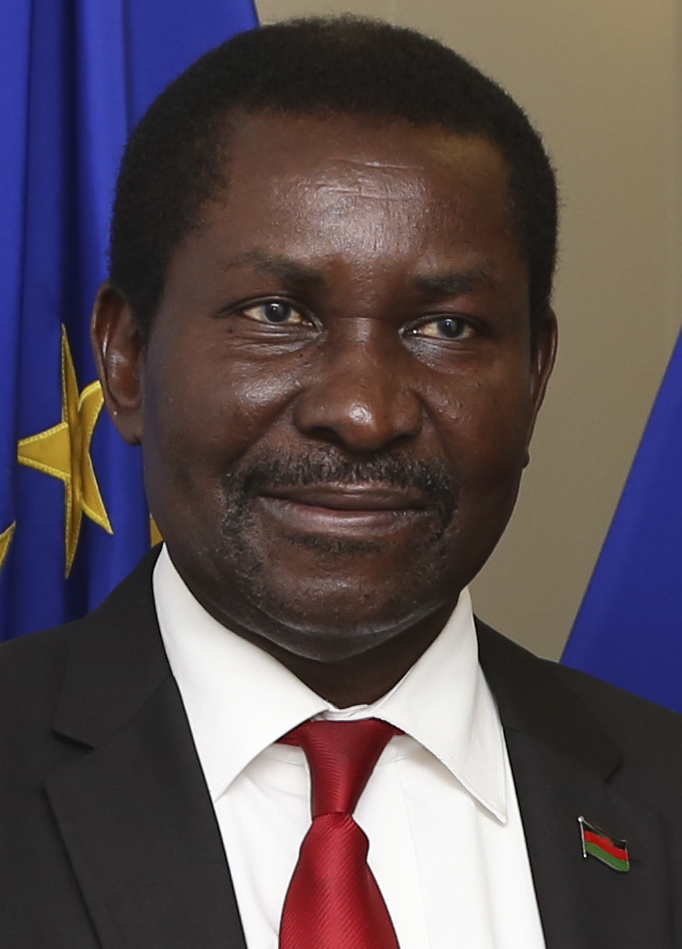
Ephraim Mganda Chiume in 2014.

Ephraim Mganda Chiume (born 1953) is a Malawian politician. A member of the Democratic Progressive Party (DPP), he formerly served in the Cabinet of Malawi, holding the position of Minister of Foreign Affairs between 2012 and 2014.

== Life ==
Chiume was born in 1953. He obtained a BSc Degree in Quantity Surveying in the United Kingdom. He is a member of the Royal Institution of Chartered Surveyors in the UK, and the Surveyors Institute of Malawi. He worked for Brendan Penny Associates, Bristol in the UK, and Peter Richards & Partners in Zambia, Botswana and Malawi. Chiume established his own consultancy of Chartered Quantity Surveyors in Lilongwe.

Chiume joined the Democratic Progressive Party and became the party's Administrative Secretary. From 2008, he was a member of the DPP Governing Council. On 19 May 2009, Chiume was elected Member of Parliament for Nkhata bay North Constituency on the DPP ticket. He was appointed Deputy Minister of Natural Resources and Energy in the cabinet that became effective on 15 June 2009., and was confirmed in this position in the reshuffle announced on 9 August 2010. He then served as Minister for Justice between 2011 and 2012, and as Minister of Foreign Affairs between 2012 and 2014.

In 2018 he was there as the local MP when TX Chipunga Community Secondary School was begun. The boarding school would allow girls in Chipinga to avoid a 30 km round trip to access secondary education. The school was built on land donated by the community and a $100,000 grant. The first students were at the school in 2019 and the first set graduated in 2023.
