= Fraser Nihorya =

Malawian politician (died 2019)

Fraser Nihorya (died 23 February 2019) was a Malawian politician. He was deputy minister of finance in 2010.
