= Yunus Mussa =

Malawi politician

Yunus Mussa is a politician in Malawi who was appointed Minister of Labour in the cabinet that became effective 15 June 2009.

Mussa was born in Zomba and attended Osman Gani Primary School and Masongola Secondary School. He entered politics in 1999, and was elected Member of Parliament for Zomba Central in 2004 on the United Democratic Front ticket. In May 2009 he was reelected after standing for the Democratic Progressive Party. As of 2007, Mussa was Deputy Minister for Social Development and Persons with Disabilities. Mussa was appointed Minister of Labour in the cabinet that became effective 15 June 2009. He retained his position after the reshuffle of 9 August 2010.

Mussa responded to a report in August 2009 that said children picking tobacco in the fields of Malawi were exposed to the nicotine equivalent of two packs of cigarettes per day. He said the government was reviewing labor laws, which should provide stiffer penalties for employing child labor. In June 2010, Mussa urged private sector employers to increase the salaries of their employees, as the government had done with public sector workers for the past six years. In January 2011, he said that the Tenants Labour Bill would soon be submitted to parliament. The bill aims to protect workers from exploitation, and to prevent children from being employed on estates. In February 2011, Mussa said that just 500,000 people, about 4% of the 13 million plus population of Malawi, were employed. He said that the "Government is still doing all it can to create jobs in the country".
