= Ralph Jooma =

Malawian politician

Ralph Pachalo Jooma is a Malawian politician. He was previously the Deputy Minister of Health in Malawi. He was elected as a Member of Parliament for the Monkey Bay constituency in the Mangochi District under a Democratic Progressive Party (DPP) seat.

He was also chairman of the parliamentary committee on budget and finance in Malawi's parliament.
