= Uladi Mussa =

Malawian politician

Uladi Anthusafunana Basikolo Chenji Golo Mussa is a Malawian politician and educator. He was the former Minister of Home Affairs and Internal Security in Malawi, having been appointed to the position in early 2004 by the former president of Malawi, Bingu wa Mutharika. His term began in June 2004.

In 2019 he was answering charges that he had granted citizenship to Burundians after they had been in Malawi for less than a year. He was accused of taking bribes as the usual period was seven years. The Law Commissioner, Rosemary Kanyuka, was proposing to stop similar abuse in future. He was jailed and released in 2023 by the President.

Awards and achievements
Preceded by	Minister of Home Affairs and Internal Security of Malawi	Succeeded by
