= Peter Mwanza =

Malawian politician

Professor Peter Nelson Mwanza (born May 1937) is a Malawian politician. He was appointed Minister of Lands, Housing and Urban Development in the government of President Bingu wa Mutharika of Malawi on 17 June 2009. He was reassigned to become Minister of Agriculture and Food Security in a cabinet reshuffle on 9 August 2010.

== Birth and education ==
Peter N. Mwanza was born in May 1937 in Mzimba, Malawi, the youngest of a family of five. He attended the University of London in the early 1960s, where he obtain a BSc degree in biology. He then held a position as a research scientist in Entomology with the Ministry of Agriculture in Malawi for one year. He left this job after obtaining a Ford Foundation International Fellowship to pursue advanced studies in the United States, attending Ohio State University and earning Masters and PhD degrees in Microbiology.

== Academic career ==
Returning to Malawi in 1966, Mwanza became a lecturer at the newly established University of Malawi. He was eventually promoted to become the first Malawian Principal of Chancellor College. In this position, he integrated the Mpemba School of Administration and Law and the Soche Hill College of Education into Chancellor College, and arranged for the college to relocate from Blantyre to Zomba. He was instrumental on the establishment of the National Research Council of Malawi in 1974. In 1979, Mwanza joined the United Nations as Director of Natural Resources, Environment and Science and Technology Division of the United Nations Economic Commission for Africa. Mwanza retired from the UN in 1996, and assisted in establishing Mzuzu University. He was Chairman of the University Council, and later Vice Chancellor. He also became Chairman of the Malawi Environmental and Endowment Trust, which he helped establish.

== Political career ==
Mzanza was elected to parliament as representative for Mzuzu-City. In May 2009, he was selected by president Bingu wa Mutharika to become a cabinet Minister, expected to get the Education portfolio. However, he was given the ministry of Lands, Housing and Urban Development. In a cabinet shuffle of 9 August 2010 he was reassigned to become Minister of Agriculture and Food Security, a job previously held by the President. Margaret Roka Mauwa continued in her role as Deputy Minister of the department.
