= Peter Mutharika =

President of Malawi (2014–2020; since 2025)

His Excellency Peter Mutharika
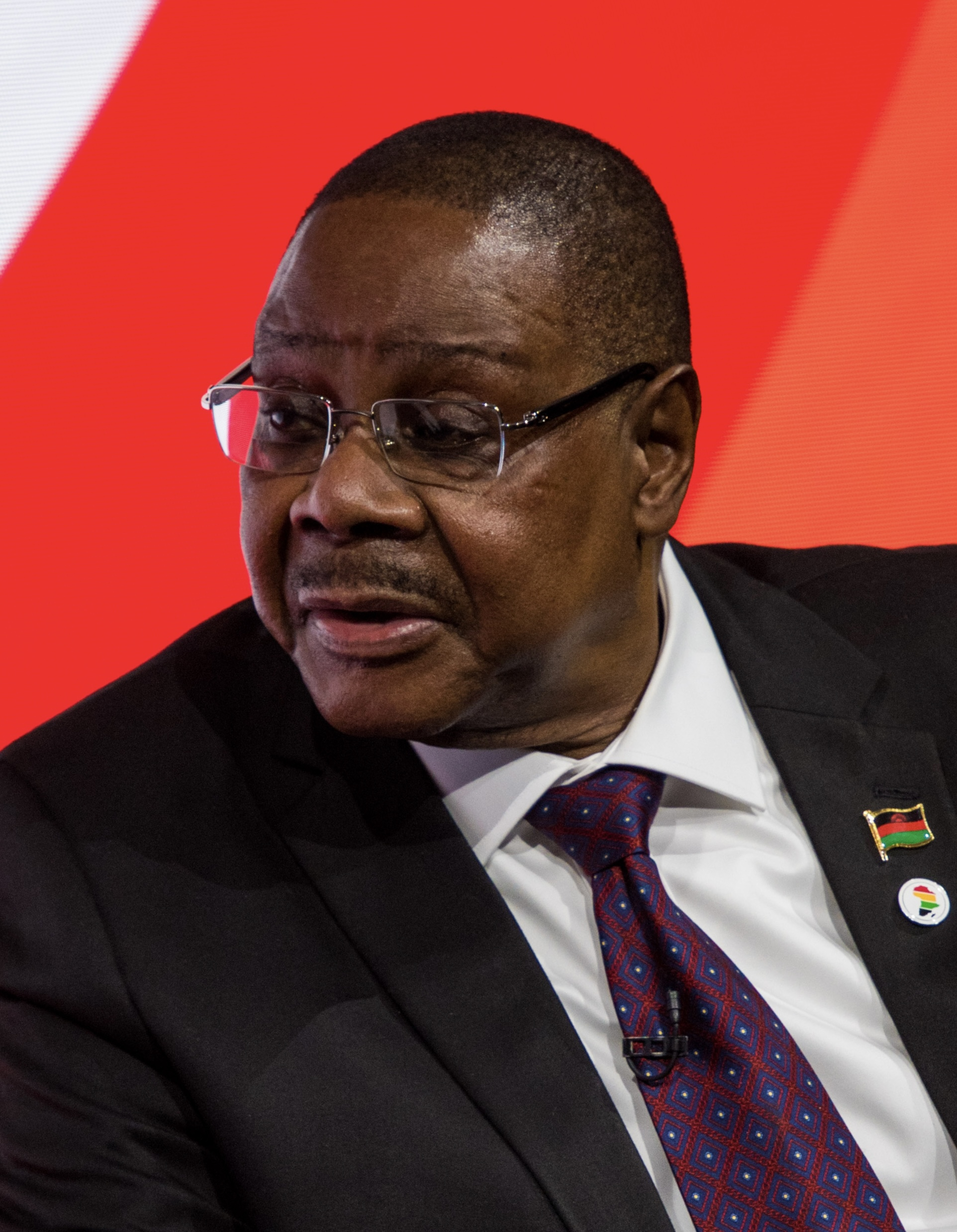
- Mutharika in 2020

5th & 7th President of Malawi
- Incumbent
- Assumed office 4 October 2025
- Vice President: Jane Ansah
- Preceded by: Lazarus Chakwera
- In office 31 May 2014 – 28 June 2020
- Vice President: Saulos Chilima (2014–2019); Everton Chimulirenji (2019–2020)
- Preceded by: Joyce Banda
- Succeeded by: Lazarus Chakwera

President of the Democratic Progressive Party
- Incumbent
- Assumed office 5 April 2012
- Preceded by: Bingu wa Mutharika
Ministerial offices held
Minister of Foreign Affairs
In office 8 September 2011 – 26 April 2012
President	Bingu wa Mutharika; Joyce Banda
Preceded by	Etta Banda
Succeeded by	Ephraim Chiume
Minister of Education, Science and Technology
In office 9 August 2010 – 8 September 2011
President	Bingu wa Mutharika
Preceded by	George Chaponda
Succeeded by	George Chaponda
Minister of Justice
In office 15 June 2009 – 9 August 2010
President	Bingu wa Mutharika
Preceded by	Henry Dama Phoya
Succeeded by	George Chaponda
Advisor to The President on Foreign and Domestic Policy
In office 15 June 2009 – 5 April 2012
President	Bingu wa Mutharika

Member of the National Assembly for Thyolo East
- In office 19 May 2009 – 20 May 2014
- Preceded by: Bapu Khamisa
- Succeeded by: Gerson Timothy Solomoni

Personal details
- Born: Arthur Peter Mutharika; 18 July 1940 (age 86) Chisoka, Thyolo District, Nyasaland (present-day Malawi)
- Party: DPP (since 2004)
- Other political affiliations: UDF (before 2004)
- Spouses: Christophine (m. 1960; died 1990); Gertrude Maseko (m. 2014)
- Children: 3
- Relatives: Bingu wa Mutharika (brother)
- Education: University of London (LLB); Yale University (LLM, JSD)
- Profession: Lawyer-Professor of Law-politician
- Awards: International Jurist Award

Arthur Peter Mutharika (/muːtəˈriːkə/ moot-ə-REE-kə; born 18 July 1940) is a Malawian politician and lawyer who has been the seventh president of Malawi since 2025. A member of the Democratic Progressive Party (DPP) and the younger brother of the third president, Bingu wa Mutharika, he served as the fifth president from 2014 to 2020 and has also been leading the DPP since 2012.

Born in Thyolo District, Mutharika graduated from the University of London in 1965 with a bachelor's degree in law, and the Yale University with a master's degree in law in 1966 and a doctorate in Juridical Science in 1968. In 1971, he was admitted to the bar in Tanzania and became a professional lawyer. As professor, Mutharika taught several universities in the United States, the United Kingdom, Tanzania, Ethiopia, and Uganda. He has also worked in the field of international justice, specialising in international economic law, international law and comparative constitutional law.

In 2009, Mutharika joined politics during the presidency of his elder brother and was elected to the National Assembly for the Thyolo East District. Mutharika was later appointed as an Advisor to The President on Foreign and Domestic Policy and Minister of Justice by Bingu and served in these positions until the following year when he was appointed Minister of Education, Science and Technology and served in the role until the following year when Mutharika was appointed Minister of Foreign Affairs. In 2012, Bingu died and Mutharika was wrongfully accused of attempting to succeed his brother instead of vice president Joyce Banda. Banda became president as stated by the Constitution with the support of the military. Two years later, Mutharika was elected president in the 2014 presidential election, defeating Banda and the opposition Malawi Congress Party (MCP)'s Lazarus Chakwera.

During Mutharika's first, Malawi experienced steady economic growth with inflation falling from 24% in 2014 to single digits by 2019, and many infrastructure projects advanced further during this time as well. Mutharika also established community colleges. Mutharika won the 2019 presidential election, which was disputed by the opposition. In February 2020, the Supreme Court of Appeal annulled the election citing irregularities that did not affect the vote and in the rerun election in June of the following year, Mutharika lost to Chakwera, after nine political parties banded together to form the Tonse Alliance and backed Chakwera.

In August 2020, two months after leaving the presidency, Mutharika's bank account was suspended by the Malawi Anti-Corruption Commission. In January 2021, the High Court dismissed Mutharika's request to lift the suspension of his bank account. In July 2022, Mutharika said that his party was ready to win the 2025 general elections and was still considering whether to run again. Mutharika eventually announced his candidacy in August 2024 and overwhelmingly defeated Chakwera in the 2025 presidential election in September.

Mutharika is the oldest Malawian president ever, and could have been the second president to turn 80 while in office had he remained in office past his 80th birthday on 18 July 2020, following Hastings Banda, the first Malawian president. Having assumed office at the age of nearly 74, Mutharika became the oldest ever president to assume office in Malawian history, surpassing Banda, who assumed office at the age of 68 in 1966. When Mutharika was sworn in for a second term in 2025, he broke his own record in 2014 and once again became the oldest Malawian president to take office, having taken office at the age of 85. Mutharika is also currently the sixth oldest serving state leader in the world.

== Early life and education ==
Arthur Peter Mutharika was born on 18 July 1940 in Thyolo. His parents were teachers. He attended primary school at various institutions, including Mulanje Mission Primary School, before moving on to Dedza Secondary School.

== Legal career ==
=== Early career ===
Mutharika received his LL.B. law degree from the University of London in 1965. He then received his LL.M. and J.S.D. degrees from Yale University in 1966 and 1969 respectively. Mutharika has been admitted to the bar in Tanzania as a professional lawyer since 1971. As a professor of law, he has taught at University of Dar es Salaam (Tanzania), Haile Selassie University (Ethiopia), Rutgers University (USA), the United Nations Institute for Training and Research Program for Foreign Service Officers from Africa and Asia at Makerere University (Uganda), and for 37 years at Washington University in St. Louis, and has served as an Academic Visitor at the London School of Economics. He also served as advisor to the American Bar Association's Rule of Law initiative for Africa.

=== Late career ===
He assisted as an advisor in the campaign for his brother, Bingu wa Mutharika, for re-election as president in 2009. In 1995 he argued for limiting presidential powers in Malawi. He then entered Malawian politics where he became a Minister in a cabinet he helped to create. He also continued to serve as an adviser to the President until the President's death in 2012 in issues of foreign and domestic policy.

=== ICSID Arbitration Tribunal ===
Mutharika was part of a three-man tribunal that was arbitrating international cases. In August 2011, Mutharika decided to resign from two international court cases with the International Center for Settlement of Investment Disputes that he was arbitrating on Zimbabwe where foreign investors sued the Zimbabwean government for breaches of bilateral investment treaties. This was due to concerns about his impartiality because of Bingu Mutharika's close associations with the Mugabe government.

== Early political career ==
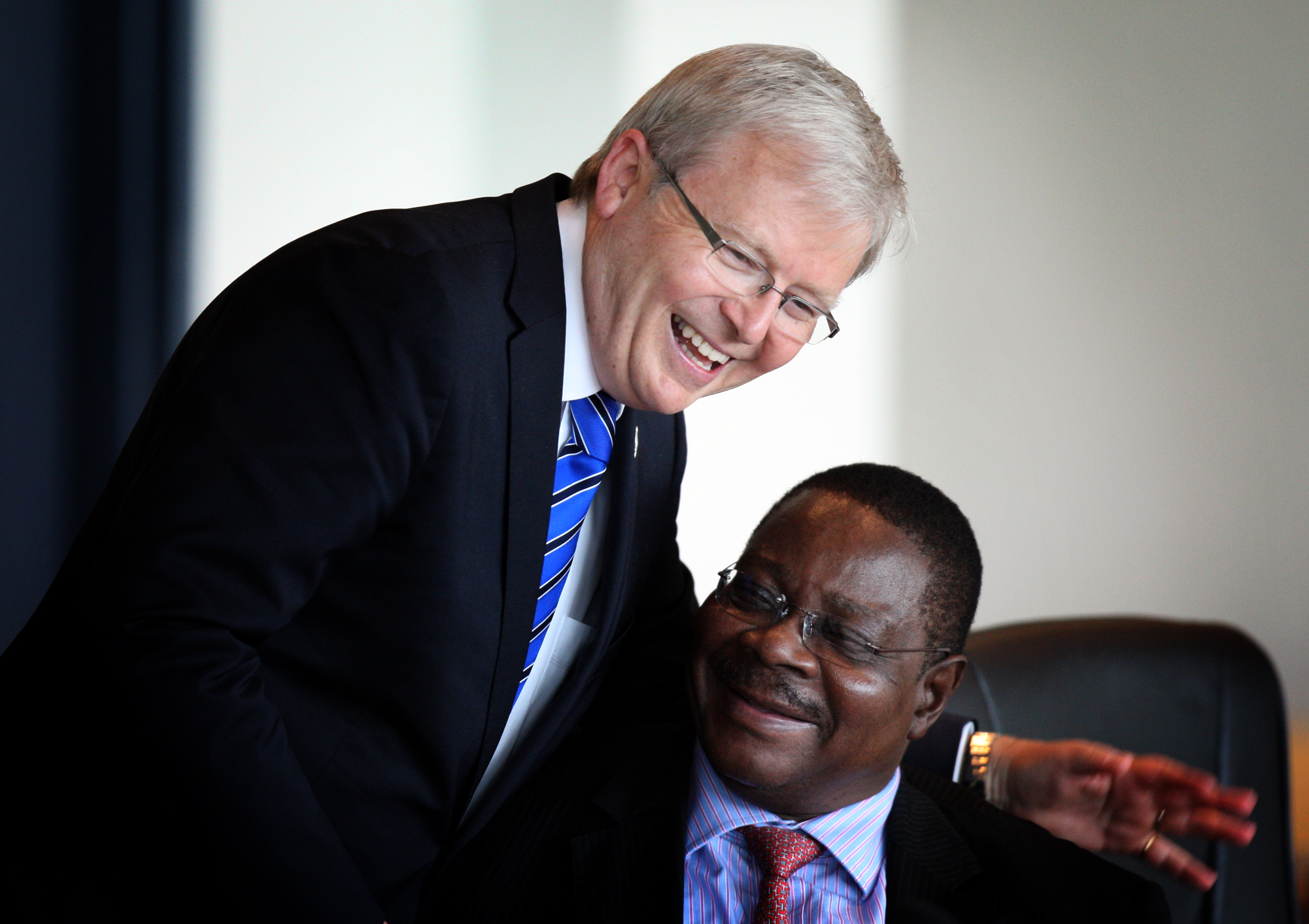
Mutharika with Australian Foreign Minister Kevin Rudd

He is a member of the Democratic Progressive Party (DPP). In May 2009, he was elected to the Malawian Parliament, and he was subsequently appointed by his brother President Bingu wa Mutharika to the Malawi Cabinet as Minister of Justice and Constitutional Affairs. He then became Minister of Education, Science and Technology and as of 8 September 2011 he was the Minister of Foreign Affairs in the new "war cabinet".

=== DPP factions ===
In 2010, tensions rose over claims that Bingu planned to name Peter to succeed him as party leader over his vice-president, Joyce Banda. Banda was later expelled from the DPP and launched her own party, the People's Party (PP), which led to members of the DPP resigning in protest. In line with Malawi's laws, Joyce Banda continued to remain Vice-President.

==== DPP presidential endorsement ====
In August 2011, the DPP National Governing Council (NGC) endorsed Peter Mutharika as presidential candidate for the 2014 elections. This announcement came a few days after the 20 July 2011 protests where nationwide strikes were held against Bingu Mutharika's regime. His appointment was endorsed by the DPP NGC since the party did not hold a convention to elect new leaders. The Secretary General, Wakuda Kamanga stated that the decision was made in spite of the protests because the party believed that the "anger would fade". This endorsement also led to the firing of those that were against the nomination process within the party including first vice-president Joyce Banda and second vice-president Khumbo Kachali.

=== US citizenship controversy ===
Peter Mutharika's candidacy for position as a government minister and his eligibility for presidency had been controversial because of speculation and doubt over his Malawian citizenship. A senior Political and Administrative lecturer at the University of Malawi, Mustapha Hussein has stated that his "eligibility should be viewed in the context of his being Malawian, he would be above 35 years of age by 2014, and he has not been convicted of any criminal activities for the past seven years." Malawi's laws however, do not allow dual citizenship and it was wrongly speculated that he obtained US citizenship whilst living in the US and hence, had renounced his Malawian citizenship as is required by law. Nonetheless, the US embassy in Lilongwe confirmed that he is not a citizen but a Green card holder. The ruling DPP has stated that Mutharika is a Malawian citizen and would run for president as a Malawian citizen and not an American one. There was controversy that, as the holder of a US Greencard, he owes an allegiance to the United States. Therefore, people on the street are of the view that a nation cannot be run by someone who will be spending the minimum of three months in the US annually required to retain permanent resident status. In February 2014, he relinquished his green card and permanent resident status.

== First presidency (2014–2020) ==
=== First term ===
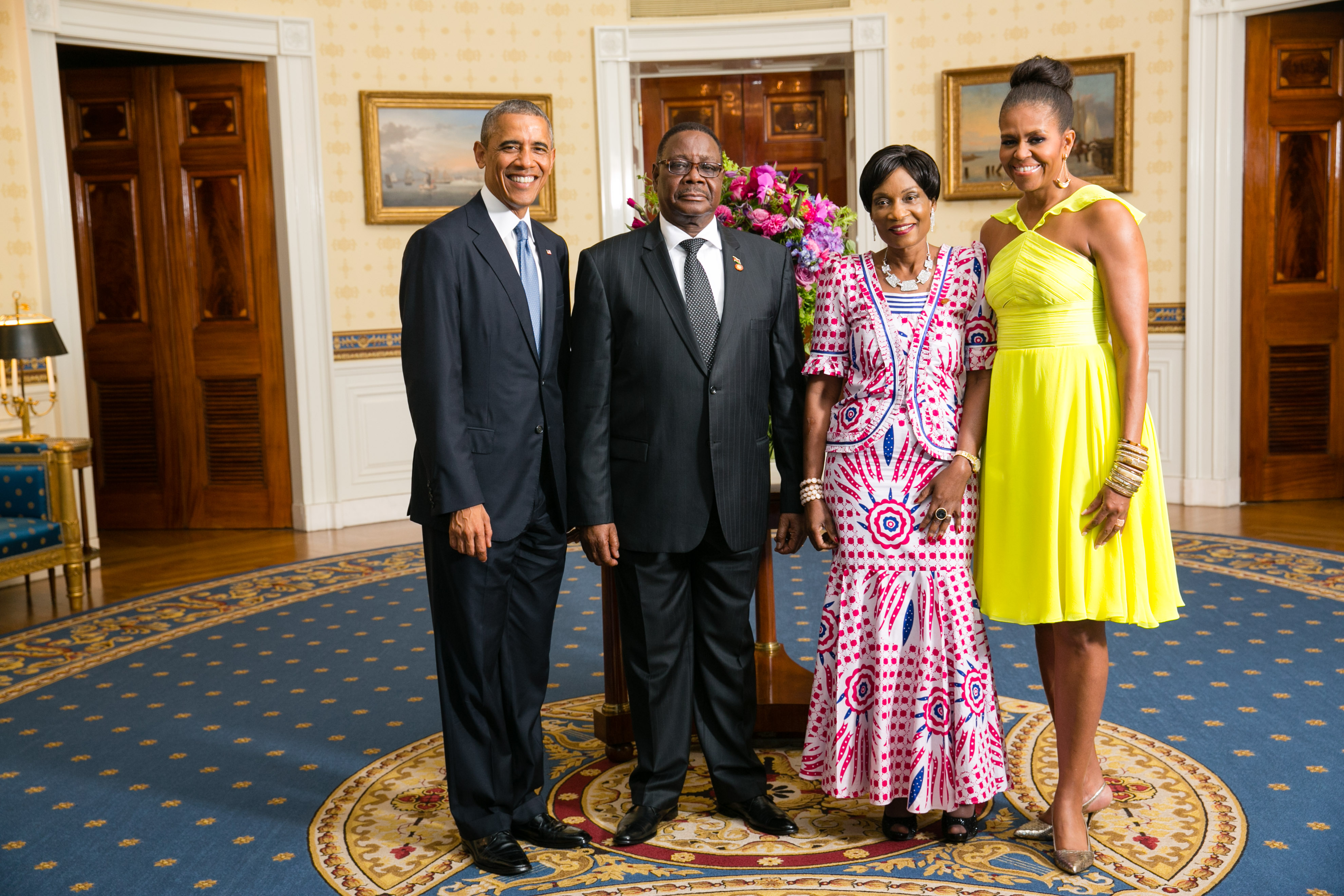
Mutharika and his wife, Gertrude, with US president Barack Obama and First Lady Michelle Obama, August 2014.

Mutharika was elected as president in the 2014 election. He was sworn in as the fifth president of Malawi on 31 May 2014. At nearly 74, he was then the oldest person to assume the office (Mutharika himself was older when he was inaugurated in 2025). Naming his cabinet in June 2014, Mutharika took charge of the defense portfolio himself. He appointed the veteran economist Goodall Gondwe as Minister of Finance and appointed one of the defeated presidential candidates, Atupele Muluzi, as Minister of Natural Resources, Energy and Mining. In June 2014, Mutharika supported diversification of Malawi's agriculture into other crops besides tobacco.

His first term was marked by strong popular discontent, due to corruption, food shortages and power cuts. In 2018, thousands of people took to the streets in several cities across the country to denounce corruption scandals. Mutharika was accused of the involvement in a bribery case, suspected of having received more than $200,000 from a businessman who had obtained a multi-million dollar contract with the police. Malawi's Anti-Corruption Bureau (ACB) cleared Muthatika on the Malawi Police Service food rations contract allegations. The ACB stated that investigations into the Malawi Police Service (MPS) food rations contract have revealed that President Peter Mutharika did not personally benefit from $200,000 deposited in the Democratic Progressive Party's bank account.

=== 2019 and 2020 elections ===
On 21 May 2019, Malawi held elections to elect a new president, members of parliament, and local government councillors. Peter Mutharika was nominated and endorsed as the presidential candidate of the DPP. His main challenger was Lazarus Chakwera of the Malawi Congress Party (MCP). Saulos Chilima, who had been Mutharika's vice president since 2014, also put up a strong challenge against Mutharika since the two parted ways in April 2018. The election was marred with controversy and claims of rigging by Mutharika's DPP. In some districts such as Nsanje and Chikwawa in the southern end of Malawi, the Malawi Electoral Commission staff managing the polls were accused of swapping the presidential results for Chakwera to be for Mutharika. A district polling staff for Nsanje, Fred Thomas, was arrested for being found tampering with results sheets of the election. Similar issues of vote rigging and threatening of opposition political party monitors by the DPP were reported in other districts such as Zomba, Thyolo, Mulanje, Lilongwe and Nkhotakota. A lot of results sheets were alleged to have also been affected by tampering by "tippexing". Political thugs, thought to be from the DPP, got hold of results and changed figures by 'erasing' original figures by applying tippex (a brand of correction fluid). This led to the election to be known as "the Tippex Election", and the subsequent election of Mutharika as "the Tippex President". On 27 May 2019 and despite all the irregularities, the Malawi Electoral Commission Chairperson Supreme Court judge Justice Jane Ansah, announced Mutharika as the winner of the controversial elections with 1,940,709 votes against 1,781,740 for closest challenger Dr Lazarus Chakwera of the MCP. Saulos Chilima, who represented the UTM polled 1,018,369 votes. Mutharika was subsequently sworn in on 31 May 2019 for a new five-year term. The opposition MCP and UTM have then further applied to the High Court of Malawi to nullify the election results and conduct another election. Meanwhile, supporters of the opposition continued conducting demonstrations ever since against the conduct of the elections. The Human Rights Defenders Coalition (HRDC) then headed by Timothy Mtambo led a wave of protest against Mutharika regime accusing his government of nepotism and demanding that Jane Ansah resign.

On 3 February 2020, the Constitutional Court judges arrived in Lilongwe court to give a long-awaited ruling on that disputed presidential election, travelling in a military vehicle under heavy police escort. The judges took turns to read the 500-page decision over more than seven hours. The Malawi Constitutional Court ruled to nullify the 21 May 2019 election, citing irregularities that did not affect the election results by the Malawi Electoral Commission. It further ordered fresh elections to be conducted in 150 days. The nullification was unprecedented in Malawi, and only the second instance of such happening in Africa, the other being the Supreme Court of Kenya decision regarding the 2017 Kenyan presidential election.

Mutharika was defeated by Lazarus Chakwera in the 2020 election re-run, having only obtained about 40% of the vote.

== Between presidencies (2020–2025) ==
In August 2020, the Malawi Anti-Corruption Commission froze the bank accounts of Peter and his wife Gertrude, as a part of an anti-corruption investigation into the importation of 5 billion Malawian kwacha's worth of cement free of taxes, a privilege for incumbent presidents in Malawi. In January 2021, the High Court dismissed Mutharika's application to lift the freeze on his accounts.

On 17 July 2022, Peter Mutharika held a press conference at his Page House in Mangochi where he accused Chakwera's administration of failing Malawians and not fulfilling their Campaign promises. He also vowed that his party was planning on winning the 2025 elections and was still considering on whether he should stand again.

=== 2025 election ===
Mutharika announced plans to run again for president in 2025 against Chakwera. In August 2024, Mutharika's candidacy was endorsed by the DPP. Mutharika defeated Chakwera and won almost 57% of the vote in the election held on 16 September 2025.

== Second presidency (2025–present) ==
=== Inauguration ===
Mutharika was inaugurated for a second time as president in a ceremony at Kamuzu Stadium in Blantyre on 4 October 2025. Having assumed office at the age of 85, Mutharika became the oldest individual in Malawi to assume office, beating his own record in 2014, and also became the eighth oldest serving state leader ever and the third in Africa, after Jean-Lucien Savi de Tové in Togo and Paul Biya in Cameroon. Mutharika also became the first Malawian president to serve two nonconsecutive terms as president. Mutharika began establishing his cabinet the next day.

=== Early actions ===
On 21 October, on his first major policy, Mutharika announced plans to abolish tuition fees for both primary and secondary schools starting from January 2026. However, Mutharika stated that fees for boarding schools would remain. He also stated that his government is procuring 200,000 metric tons of maize from neighboring Zambia to feed more than four million food-insecure people in the country. On 23 October, Mutharika and his government announced plans to ban raw mineral exports in an attempt to save $500 million and increase Malawi's economic independence.

== Personal life ==
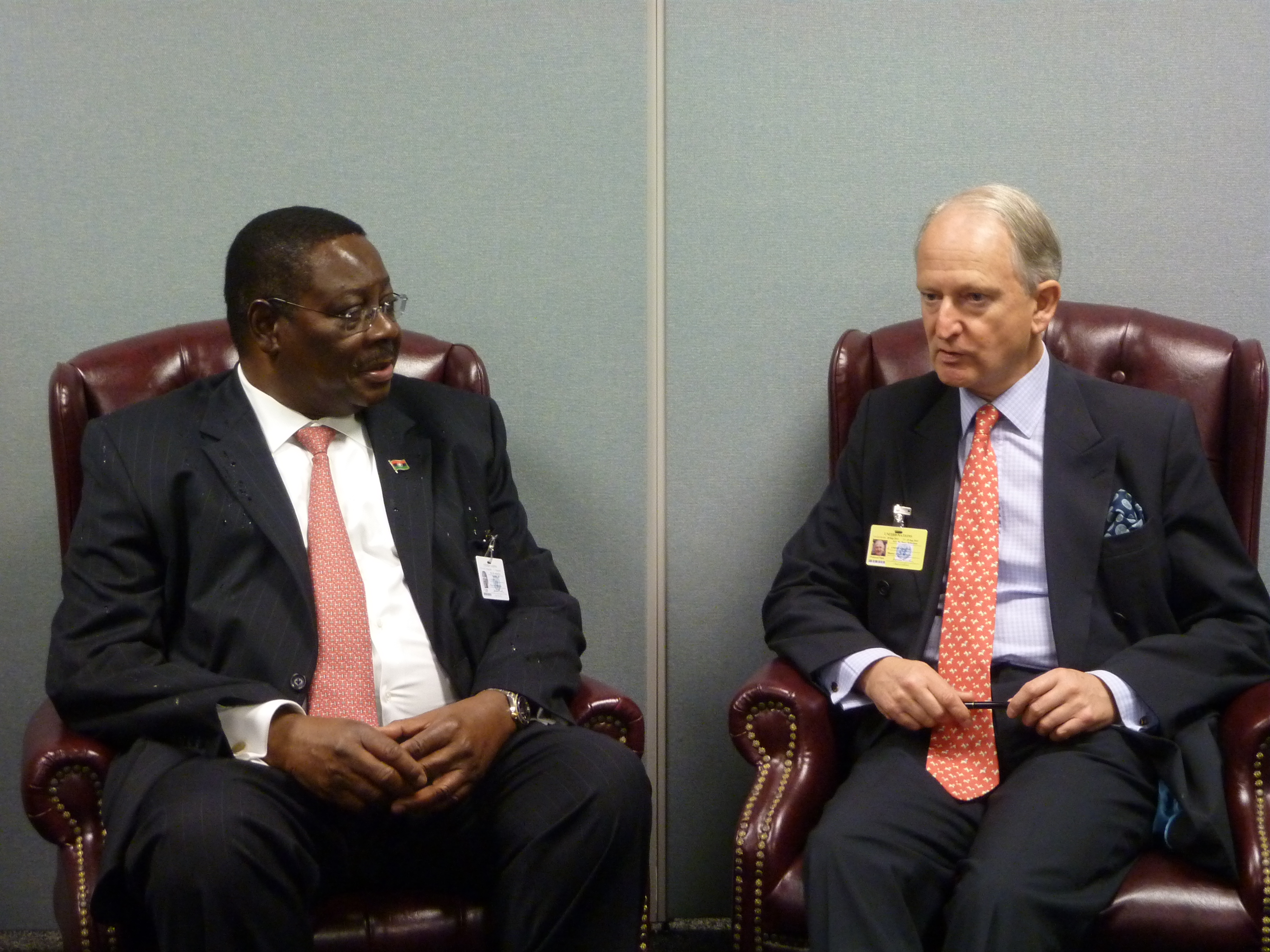
Mutharika meeting Henry Bellingham of the British Foreign Office

Mutharika has two daughters, Moyenda and Monique, and a son, Mahopela, from his first marriage. His first wife, Christophine, died from cancer on 1 January 1990. She was a Catholic from the Caribbean.

Mutharika remained a widower for more than twenty years, but on 21 June 2014, he married Gertrude Maseko, a member of the Malawi Parliament.

Mutharika is a member of the Presbyterian Church.

== Allegations ==
=== Electoral malpractice ===
In July 2019, the Malawi Congress Party (MCP) accused Mutharika of electoral malpractice following the disputed general elections held earlier that year. The party’s Secretary General, Eisenhower Mkaka, speaking on Capital Radio’s Straight Talk program, referred to Mutharika as a "thief" and called for his immediate resignation, urging him to establish a National Governing Council to oversee new elections.

The MCP maintained that the 2019 election results, declared by the Malawi Electoral Commission (MEC), were fraudulent and unrepresentative of the people’s will. Mutharika’s Democratic Progressive Party (DPP) had been declared the winner with 38.57 percent of the vote, while opposition candidates Lazarus Chakwera of the MCP and Saulos Chilima of the UTM jointly secured about 55 percent between them. Both opposition parties contested the outcome in court, alleging irregularities and calling for a rerun.

== Criticism ==
=== Regionalism ===
Mutharika's Executive Order No. 01 of 2025, which directed the relocation of several government institutions from Lilongwe to Blantyre and Zomba, was criticised by citizens, civil society groups, media analysts, and members of the public. The Centre for Human Rights and Rehabilitation (CHRR) cautioned that the move could create administrative instability and undermine efficiency.

Some argued that the relocations raised broader concerns about inclusivity and regional balance, that transferring national institutions to the south could disadvantage citizens in the central and northern regions. Critics contended that what was once a practical and accessible arrangement under Lilongwe’s central location now risks deepening regional disparities and limiting access to public services for people from areas such as Mzimba, Karonga, and Nkhatabay. Analysts further warned that the decision might reinforce perceptions of regional favoritism and weaken the sense of national unity if not guided by transparent and equitable policy considerations.

== Selected works ==
- Foreign Investment Security in Sub-Saharan Africa: The Emerging Policy and Legal Frameworks (book).
- "Accountability for Political Abuses in Pre-Democratic Malawi: The Primacy of Truth" – Third World Legal Studies, 2003.
- "Approaches to Restorative Justice in Malawi", 13th Commonwealth Law Conference, Melbourne, Australia, April 2003.
- "Legal System of Malawi", Legal Systems of the World (2002).
- "Some Thoughts on Rebuilding African State Capability", Washington University Law Quarterly (1998).
- "Creating an Attractive Investment Climate in the Eastern and Southern Africa (COMESA) Region", Foreign Investment Law Journal (1997).
- "The Role of the United Nations Security Council in African Peace Management: Some Proposals", Michigan Journal of International Law (1996).
- "The 1995 Democratic Constitution of Malawi", Journal of African Law (1996).
- "The Role of International Law in the Twenty-First Century: An African Perspective", Fordham International Law Journal (1995) and reprinted in Commonwealth Law Bulletin (1995).
- "The Regulation of Statelessness Under International and National Law", Oceana Publications (1986).
- "The Alien Under American Law", Oceana Publications (1988).
- "The International Law of Development", Oceana Publications (1995).
- "The Work of Council International Co-operation Of Humanity", African Magazine (2003).

== Awards ==
Mutharika is a recipient of the following awards:

- Honorary Doctor of Letters (Hon. D.Litt.), University of Addis Ababa, Ethiopia in 2016
- Honorary Professor, University of International Business and Economics, Beijing, China, 2018
- Honorary Doctor of Humane Letters (L.H.D.), Washington University in St. Louis, Missouri, United States in 2018
- Lifetime Achievement Award on Africa's Sustainable Development, Iconic Africa Summit, Harare, Zimbabwe, 2026

== International positions held ==
- President, International Third-World Legal Studies Association, 1986-1993
- Global Fund Replenishment Champion, 2018-2019
- Member, Committee of Ten African Heads of State Championing the Advancement of Education, Science and Technology, appointed by the African Union 2018
- Champion, Global Partnership for Education
- African Development Bank, Youth Champion
- Co-convenor, Global Commission on Financing Education
- Champion, Trade Related Aspects of Property Rights (TRIPS)
- UN Women "HeForShe" Champion
- UNFPA Global Youth Champion
- Advisor in Council of the Economic and Trade Cooperation of African Youth (ETCAY)
- Board Chairperson for United Nations Economic and Trade Commission of Africa

Political offices
Preceded by Etta Banda	Minister of Foreign Affairs; 2011–2012	Succeeded by Ephraim Chiume
Preceded by Joyce Banda	President of Malawi; 2014–2020	Succeeded by Lazarus Chakwera
