= Democratic Progressive Party (Malawi) =

Political party in Malawi

- Abbreviation: DPP
- President: Peter Mutharika
- Secretary-General: Peter Mukhito
- Spokesperson: Shadrick Namalomba
- Founder: Bingu wa Mutharika
- Founded: February 2005
- Split from: United Democratic Front
- Headquarters: Lilongwe
- Ideology: Anti-corruption; Liberalism
- Political position: Big tent
- Colours: Blue
- Slogan: Prosperity, Justice, Security
- National Assembly: 78 / 229
- SADC PF: 0 / 5
- Pan-African Parliament: 0 / 5

The Democratic Progressive Party (DPP) is a political party in Malawi. It was formed in February 2005 by then-President of Malawi Bingu wa Mutharika after a dispute with his party, the United Democratic Front (UDF), which was led by him in the 2004 general election and chaired by his predecessor, Bakili Muluzi. The party returned to power in 2025 in a peaceful transition.

== History ==
The DPP party is an offshoot of the United Democratic Front. The UDF was formed by Bingu wa Mutharika and Bakili Muluzi and came to power in 1994 under Muluzi. After Muluzi's two terms were over, Mutharika succeeded him as head of the party and nation. However, Muluzi remained involved in running the party; therefore Mutharika formed his own party, the Democratic Progressive Party, in early 2005. Many UDF members defected to the new DPP party. The party and Mutharika won elections in 2009, and continued to rule the country. It regained its ruling position in 2025 when the party took nearly 57% of the national vote. The outgoing President conceded defeat in a transition that was noted for its calm transfer of power.

== Internal politics ==
In October 2008, the DPP's national governing council unanimously chose Mutharika as the party's candidate for the May 2009 presidential election.

=== Rise of the PP ===
Bingu wa Mutharika increasingly became controlling in the party. He began to groom his brother, Peter Mutharika, to be his successor. This led to a situation where he began to sideline his vice-president Joyce Banda due to her refusal to accept the move. Mutharika then expelled her from the party. The courts held that she was still the vice-president of the country even though she was not the vice-president of the party. Subsequently, Joyce Banda formed the People's Party. When Mutharika died in April 2012, Banda was still the vice-president and thus succeeded Mutharika as president, leaving the DPP under Peter Mutharika in opposition.

=== 1 August 2011 DPP politburo ===
On 1 August 2011, Bingu wa Mutharika shuffled the leadership of the DPP. Bintony Kutsaira, who was secretary general of the party, was moved to the Office of the President and Cabinet and replaced by Wakuda Kamanga. Former finance minister Goodall Gondwe was named first vice-president, replacing Joyce Banda who was dismissed from the party in December 2010 for "anti-party activities". Following the death of President Mutharika, who was also party leader, the National Governing Council of the Party chose Peter Mutharika as the new Party President on 6 April 2012.

The new DPP politburo after the 2011 shuffle:

Office	1st	2nd	3rd
President	Peter Mutharika		
Vice-president	Goodall Edward Gondwe	Yunus Mussa	Jean Kalilani
Secretary General	Jean Kalilani		
Deputy Secretary General	Isaac Nyakamera	Etta Banda	Ralph Jooma
Treasurer General	Sidik Mia	Bessie Chirambo	Leckford Thotho
National Organising Secretary	Francis Mphepo	Catherine Hara	John Zingale
National Campaign Director	Ken Zikhale Ng'oma	Rashy Gaffar	Alice Lungu

Regional Governors:

- North: Ancient Nkhata
- Centre: Kalanzi Mbewe
- East: Yusuf Yusweja
- South: Noel Masangwi

== 2021 appeal ==
In 2021 a five judge panel formed a constitutional court led by the new attorney general Thabo Chakaka Nyirenda. It was an unusual case as the Democratic Progressive Party were arguing that an election should be overturned because it had been overseen by members of the Malawi Electoral Commission who had been illegally appointed. The case was thrown out when it was pointed out that the illegal appointments had been made by the DPP. They were told that they were trying to benefit with this case from their own illegality.

== DPP presidents ==
Key:

DPP People's MCP

No.	Portrait	Name	Term start	Term end	Length	President
1		Bingu wa Mutharika	February 2005	5 April 2012	7 years, 64 days	Himself
2		Peter Mutharika	5 April 2012	Incumbent	14 years, 92 days	Banda
2		Peter Mutharika	5 April 2012	Incumbent	14 years, 92 days	Himself
2		Peter Mutharika	5 April 2012	Incumbent	14 years, 92 days	Chakwera
2		Peter Mutharika	5 April 2012	Incumbent	14 years, 92 days	Himself

== DPP members ==
- Etta Banda
- Goodall Gondwe
- Norman Chisale
- Yunus Mussa
- Peter Mukhito
- Bingu wa Mutharika
- Sameer Suleman
- Alfred Gangata
- Yusuf Jonas

== Election results ==
=== Presidential elections ===
Election	Party Candidate	Votes	%	Position	Result
2009	Bingu wa Mutharika	2,963,820	66.17%	▲1st	Elected
2014	Peter Mutharika	1,904,399	36.42%	1st	Elected
2019	Peter Mutharika	1,940,709	38.57%	1st	Annulled
2020	Peter Mutharika	1,951,877	39.92%	▼2nd	Defeated
2025	Peter Mutharika	3,035,249	56.76%	▲1st	Elected

=== National Assembly elections ===
Election	Party leader	Votes	%	Seats	+/–	Position
2009	Bingu wa Mutharika	1,739,202	39.99%	114 / 193	▲114	▲1st
2014	Peter Mutharika	1,133,402	21.98%	51 / 193	▼63	1st
2019	Peter Mutharika	1,293,797	26.04%	62 / 193	▲11	1st
2025	Peter Mutharika	TBA	TBA	81 / 229	▲19	1st

All above results come from election reports on the Malawi Electoral Commission website.
