= List of political parties in Malawi =

This article lists political parties in Malawi. Malawi has a multi-party system with over 40 registered political parties. The political process in Malawi is such that parties are voted into power. Parties participate in an electoral process. The parties with the most representation in the National Assembly are the People's Party (PP), Malawi Congress Party (MCP), United Democratic Front (UDF), and Democratic Progressive Party (DPP).

== The rise of multi-party rule in Malawi ==
The Nyasaland African Congress led the anti-colonial movements in Malawi under the leadership of Kamuzu Banda. When the NAC was banned it changed its name to the Malawi Congress Party which led Malawi to independence and continued to rule from 1964 until 1994, under a one party state system. This system was challenged by political activists throughout the years, however Banda's dictatorship suppressed opposition, creating a culture of silence.

By 1992, Chakufwa Chihana, a trade unionist, lecturer and activist, became the catalyst for a multi-party system in Malawi. He led an underground political movement that aimed at democratic multi-party rule. He was the first person to openly challenge the system. He was arrested in 1992 when he returned to Malawi and his arrest heightened both domestic and international pressure. Chihana's freedom was supported by Amnesty International as well as the Robert F. Kennedy Association. Due to growing pressure, Banda agreed to hold a referendum to let the public decide on the issue of multi-party rule. During the 1993 referendum, Malawians voted for a multi-party system and it became legal to form political parties in Malawi. Chihana's movement lead to the formation of his party, Alliance for Democracy (AFORD). Other prominent parties formed and emerged as well, notably the United Democratic Front which was founded by Bakili Muluzi. Malawi's first multi-party elections were held in 1994. The MCP contested in these elections as well. The UDF under the charismatic Bakili Muluzi won these elections becoming the first party that was democratically voted into power in Malawi. Chihana's party came third, and he was awarded the position of second Vice-President. However, Chihana has made his mark on Malawi's history and is known as the "father of democracy" in Malawi. Malawi had peacefully ushered in multi-party rule which continues until today.

== Active parties ==
=== Parties with representation in parliament ===
Party	Abbr.	Year Founded	Leader	Political position	Ideology	MPs
Malawi Congress Party	MCP	1959	Lazarus Chakwera	Centre-right	Ubuntu; Conservatism; African nationalism Anti-colonialism; Anti-communism	59 / 193
Democratic Progressive Party	DPP	2005	Peter Mutharika	Centre	Anti-corruption; Liberalism	58 / 193
United Democratic Front	UDF	1992	Atupele Muluzi	Centre	Liberalism	10 / 193
United Transformation Movement	UTM	2018	Dalitso Kabambe	Centre	Liberalism	5 / 193
People's Party	PP	2011	Joyce Banda	Centre-right	Conservatism	4 / 193
Alliance for Democracy	AFORD	1993	Chakufwa Chihana	Centre-left	Social democracy	2 / 193

=== Parties without representation in Parliament ===
Party	Abbr.	Year Founded	Leader
Freedom Party	FP	2017	Khumbo Kachali
Malawi Democratic Party	MDP	1993	Kamlepo Kalua
Malawi Forum for Unity and Development	MAFUNDE	2004	George Mnesa
Movement for Genuine Democratic Change	MGODE	2004	Sam Kandodo Banda
National Development Party	NDP	2024	Frank Tumpale Mwenifumbo
National Unity Party	NUP	2004	Harry Chiume
People's Progressive Movement		2003	Mark Katsonga
People's Transformation Party	PETRA	2002	Kamuzu Chibambo
Solidary Alliance		2025	Victor Madhlopa
Umodzi Party	UP	2013	John Chisi

== Table of defunct political parties ==
Party	Acronym	Year Founded	Founder	President	Status
Congress for Democracy	CODE		Ralph Kasambara		Unknown
Congress for National Unity	CNU	1999	Daniel Mukhumbwe		Dissolved
Christian Democratic Party	CDP	1995	Eston Kakhome		Dissolved
Forum Party	FP	1997	Kalonga Stambuli		Dissolved
Labour Party	LP	1997	George Nathaniel Gama		Dissolved
Malawi Democratic Party	MDP	1993	Kamlepo Kalua	Kamlepo Kalua	Dissolved
Malawi Democratic Union	MDU	1993	James Amunandife Mkumba		Dissolved
Malawi Freedom Party	MFP	1996	Sulemna Ishmail Shuwah		Dissolved
Malawi National Democratic Party	MNDP	1993	T S Mangwazu		Dissolved
Mass Movement for the Young Generation	MMYG	1998	Christopher Banda		Dissolved
Movement for Genuine Democratic Change	MGODE	2004	Sam Kandodo Banda		Dissolved
Mtedere Ufulu Party	MUP	2004	Moses Harry Sandey		Dissolved
National Democratic Alliance (Balaka)	NDA	2003	Thom Chiumia		Dissolved
National Democratic Alliance (Blantyre)	NDA	2003	Brown Mpinganjira		Dissolved
National Independent Party	NIP	1999	Elias Wilfred Matemangwe		Dissolved
National Patriotic Front	NPF	1995	Crispin Kayira		Dissolved
National Unity Party	NUP	2004	Harry Chiume		Dissolved
National Solidality Movement	NSM	1999	Kazuni Kumwenda		Dissolved
New Congress for Democracy	NCD	2004	Hetherwick M Ntaba		Dissolved
New Dawn for Africa	NDA	2003	Thom Chiumia		Dissolved
New Republican Party	NRP	2009	Trevor Hickmon	Gwanda Chakuamba	Unknown
Odya Zake Alibe Mlandu Party	Odya Zake	2025	Michael Usi	Michael Usi	Unknown
Pamodzi Freedom Party	PFP	2002	Rainford Chigandula Ndiwo		Dissolved
People's Democratic Party	PDP	1996	Rolf Patel		Dissolved
People's Popular Front	PPF	2003	Tony Chambani Mayuni		Dissolved
Republican Party	RP	2004	Stanely Masauli & Gwanda Chakuamba	Stanely Masauli	Unknown
Sapitwa National Democratic Party	SNDP	1997	Alice Pwesani Chirwa		Dissolved
The Congress for the Second Republic of Malawi	CSRM	1994	Murray William Kanyama Chiume		Dissolved
United Democratic Party	UDP	2005	Kenedy Solomon Kalambo		Dissolved
United Party	UP	1997	Bingu Wa Mutharika		Dissolved
United Front for Multiparty Democracy	UFMD	1993	Chale Frank Jiya		Dissolved

== Party coalitions ==
Coalition Name	Acronym	Coalition Parties	Year(s)	President	Vice-President	Party Colors	Slogan	Emblem	Status
Mgwirizano Coalition	MC	MDP, MAFUNDE, MGDC, NUP, PPM, PETRA, RP	2004	P	VP	PC	S	E	Dissolved
Grand Coalition	GC	CODE, PP, PPM, PETRA, UDF	2011–present	P	VP	PC	S	E	Active
Tonse Alliance	TA	MCP, UTM, PP, AFORD, PETRA, MAFUNDE, UP, FP, CSR	2020 - 2024	P	VP	PC	S	E	Dissolved

== List of ruling party by year ==
- 2025–Present - DPP
- 2020 – 2025 - MCP
- 2014 – 2020 - DPP
- 2012 - 2014 - PP
- 2009 – 2012 - DPP
- 1994 – 2009 - UDF
- 1964 – 1994 - MCP

== See also ==
- Cabinet of Malawi
- Politics of Malawi
- Elections in Malawi
- List of political parties by country
