= Politics of Malawi =

The politics of Malawi takes place in a framework of a presidential representative democratic republic, whereby the President of Malawi is both head of state and head of government, and of a multi-party system. Executive power is exercised by the government. Legislative power is vested in both the government and the National Assembly. There is a cabinet of Malawi that is appointed by the President of Malawi. The judiciary is independent of the executive and the legislature.

Malawi attained independence in July 1964 and was governed as a one-party personalist dictatorship under Hastings Banda and his Malawi Congress Party from 1964 to 1994. In the early 1990s, pressure formed on the regime to democratize. Following a 1993 referendum won by pro-democracy forces, a multi-party democratic system was established in 1994.

According to the Democracy Index, in 2024 Malawi remains a hybrid regime, but the average score fell to 5.17, its lowest since the index began in 2006.

Scholars have remarked on Malawi as an unusually resilient democracy given that it has many of the preconditions for democratic backsliding such as a weak economy, low state capacity, politically salient ethnic divisions, and a recent authoritarian past.

== Executive branch ==
Under the 1995 constitution, the president, who is both chief of state and head of the government, is chosen through universal direct suffrage every 5 years. Malawi has a vice president who is elected with the president. The president has the option of appointing a second vice president, who must be from a different party. It also includes a presidentially appointed cabinet. The members of the cabinet of Malawi can be drawn from either within or outside of the legislature.

Bakili Muluzi was president from 21 May 1994 to May 2004, having won reelection in 2000 with 51.4% of the vote to leading challenger Gwandaguluwe Chakuamba's 44.3% for the MCP-AFORD party. In the 2004 election Bingu wa Mutharika defeated Chakuamba by a ten-point margin. Although the political environment was described as "challenging", it was stated in 2009 that a multi-party system still existed in Malawi. Multiparty parliamentary and presidential elections were held for the fourth time in Malawi in May 2009, and President Mutharika was re-elected, despite charges of election fraud from his rival.

President Mutharika was seen by some as increasingly autocratic and dismissive of human rights, and in July 2011 protests over high costs of living, devolving foreign relations, poor governance and a lack of foreign exchange reserves erupted. The protests left 18 people dead and at least 44 others suffering from gunshot wounds.

In April 2012, Mutharika died of a heart attack. Over a period of 48 hours, his death was kept secret, including an elaborate flight with the body to South Africa, where the ambulance drivers refused to move the body, saying they were not licensed to move a corpse. After the South African government threatened to reveal the information, the presidential title was taken over by Vice-President Joyce Banda (not related to the former president Banda).

In 2014 Malawian general election Joyce Banda lost the elections (coming third) and was replaced by Peter Mutharika, the brother of ex-President Mutharika. In the 2019 Malawian general election president Peter Mutharika was narrowly re-elected. In February 2020 Malawi Constitutional Court overturned the result because of irregularities and widespread fraud. In May 2020 Malawi Supreme Court upheld the decision and announced a new election will be held on July 2. This was the first time election was legally challenged. Opposition leader Lazarus Chakwera won 2020 Malawian presidential election and he was sworn in as the new president of Malawi. However, Peter Mutharika returned to power as the president of Malawi by winning the 2025 Malawian general election in September 2025.

=== Current executive ===
The President of Malawi and the current executive branch is supported by appointed members of a Cabinet of Malawi and government agencies in Malawi.

In 2020 Malawi Constitutional Court annulled president Peter Mutharika’s narrow election victory and re-election because of irregularities. Opposition leader Lazarus Chakwera won 2020 Malawian presidential election and he became the new president. In September 2025, former President Peter Mutharika returned to power as the President of the country by winning the election.

Main office-holders
Office	Name	Party	Since
President	Peter Mutharika	Democratic Progressive Party	4 October 2025

== Legislative branch ==
The National Assembly has 193 members, elected for a five-year term in single-seat constituencies. The constitution also originally provided for a second house, a Senate of 80 seats, but to date no action has been taken to create the Senate, and the provisions allowing for its creation were deleted in 2001. The Senate is intended to provide representation for traditional leaders and the different geographical districts, as well as various special interest groups, such as women, youth, and the disabled.

== Judicial branch ==
The constitution provides for an independent judiciary. Malawi's judicial system, based on the English model, is made up of magisterial lower courts, a High Court, and a Supreme Court of Appeal.

Until 1969, Malawi retained a system of justice based on the colonial model, which followed the principles of English law as amended by the laws of Malawi. The hierarchy of courts began with Magistrates’ Courts in the towns, rising to a High Court and finally a Supreme Court of Appeal. In addition, mainly in rural areas, there are several levels of local courts with varying powers to hear disputes such as divorces and other matrimonial issues, inheritance and access to land based on traditional customary law. these courts also heard minor criminal cases specified in the Malawi Penal Code, using an expedited procedure. These were subordinate to the High Court, and subject to legislation giving the guarantee of a fair trial, including the right to legal representation and the right to appeal to the High Court.

After independence in 1964, Banda, who was then Prime Minister, and the Minister of Justice Orton Chirwa began to criticise such principles of English-based law as the Presumption of innocence, the need to establish guilt beyond reasonable doubt and the requirement for corroborating evidence. In 1969, the acquittal of five defendants in the first Chilobwe murders trial caused outrage although, as another individual was later found guilty of all these murders in a second trial, this anger was misplaced. Parliamentary reaction was hostile, and several speakers, including ministers, openly suggested that European judges and the European-style legal system had allowed clearly guilty defendants to escape the punishment they deserved. Aleke Banda, the Minister of Finance, particularly attacked the use of defence lawyers and the legal safeguards imposed by the English-law Rules of evidence. Banda (who had become President in 1966) said that, if the judge had any conscience, he should resign and specifically linked traditional law to making punishment certain, claiming that lack of evidence was not proof of innocence.

From 1970, the system of Traditional Courts was transformed. Three Regional Traditional Courts and a National Traditional Court of Appeal were created above the existing network of lower-level traditional courts, and given jurisdiction over virtually all criminal trials, including murder and treason, involving Africans of Malawian descent, using "customary" rules of evidence and procedure. Any appeals were directed to a National Traditional Court of Appeal rather than the Malawi High Court, as had been the case before 1970. The High Court and Supreme Court of Appeal remained in existence, and mainly dealt with civil law cases outside customary law. Although these courts retained their criminal jurisdiction, in practice the vast majority of criminal cases were heard in Traditional Courts. The Traditional Courts were supposed to operate in accordance with African law and custom, although they applied an authoritarian, restrictive and punitive version of customary law, in line with the views of Banda. The majority of the judges were chiefs without legal training, appointed by and liable to dismissal by Banda, so without any judicial independence. Defendants were not allowed lawyers to plead their cases, had no automatic rights either to call witnesses or of appeal (these were at the discretion of the courts and the minister of Justice). They were not given a summary of the charges against them before the trial, so could not prepare a defence.

During the 1970s and 1980s, the Traditional Courts gained a reputation for being used to prosecute Banda's political opponents and of being corrupt. The political manipulation of the Traditional Courts is shown in the high-profile trials of in 1976 of Albert Muwalo, Secretary General of the Malawi Congress Party and Focus Gwede, Head of the Police Special Branch, on a charge of attempting to assassinate President Banda, and the 1983 treason trial of Orton Chirwa, who was Minister of Justice until the Cabinet Crisis of 1964 and his wife, Vera Chirwa. In both cases, unsubstantiated evidence was admitted to secure convictions and all four were sentenced to death on flimsy evidence, although only Muwalo was ultimately executed.

During the transition to democracy, the operation of the three regional Traditional Courts and the National Traditional Appeal Court was suspended indefinitely in October 1993, which amounted in practice to their abolition. When the new Constitution came into force on 18 May 1994, it recognised customary law as an integral part of the legal system and converted many of the local, lower level Traditional Courts into Magistrates’ courts. It also provided for a new system of Traditional Courts but no legislation to set up such courts was introduced before 2011. The 2011 legislation provided for two levels of customary law courts: several Local Courts were established in each of Malawi's 27 districts, mainly in rural areas, and one District Appeals Local Court in each district (to hear appeals from the Local Courts). Further appeals may be made to the High Court, to which both types of Local Courts are subordinate. Each Local Court and District Appeals Local Court was headed by chairperson, who need not be a lawyer, but with a reasonable standard of education, proficiency in English and an adequate knowledge of the customary law and language of the area that the court serves. Complaints have been made that the Local Courts, now popularly called Traditional Courts, are charging excessive court fees to settle disputes.

At present (2013), Malawi has as its highest court a Supreme Court of Appeal with jurisdiction only in appeals from lower courts. Its members include the Chief Justice and nine other Supreme Court justices. The High Court of Malawi has unlimited original jurisdiction to hear and determine any civil or criminal proceedings. Most High Court cases are heard before a single judge, without a jury, but cases on constitutional matters must be heard by three judges: there is a Chief Judge and 19 other High Court judges. The High Court has a General Division which may also hear appeals from subordinate courts, and a Commercial Division, dealing with commercial or business cases. One subordinate court is the Industrial Relations Court with jurisdiction over employment issues. Cases before it are heard informally, and with some restrictions on legal representation, by a panel consisting of a chairperson and one representative each of employers and employees. Other subordinate courts are the Magistrate Courts and Local or Traditional Courts. These have defined criminal and civil jurisdiction depending on their level, but expressly excluding cases of treason, murder or manslaughter.

== Local government ==
Local government is carried out in 28 districts within three regions administered by regional administrators and district commissioners who are appointed by the central government. Local elections, the first in the multi-party era, took place on November 21, 2000. The UDF party won 70% of the seats in this election. The districts are Balaka, Blantyre, Chikwawa, Chiradzulu, Chitipa, Dedza, Dowa, Karonga, Kasungu, Likoma, Lilongwe, Machinga, Mangochi, Mchinji, Mulanje, Mwanza, Mzimba, Neno, Nkhata Bay, Nkhotakota, Nsanje, Ntcheu, Ntchisi, Phalombe, Rumphi, Salima, Thyolo, Zomba

== Political process ==
=== Political parties ===
Malawi is a multi-party state system (see list of political parties in Malawi). Malawi began as a one-party state in 1964, with the MCP being the only party until 1993. A movement called the Alliance for Democracy (AFORD) under the leadership of Chakufwa Chihana grew, calling for the end of Kamuzu Banda's dictatorship. Due to this internal and external pressure Banda agreed to hold a national referendum in 1993 where the nation voted to become a multi-party state. AFORD became the first registered opposition political party, and other opposition parties formed thereafter. The first multi-party elections occurred in 1994 in which the UDF won votes as the first administration under a multi-party system under Bakili Muluzi. Malawi is now a multi -party nation with 40 registered parties but only a few prominent ones.

=== Elections ===
Elections in Malawi have been held every five years since 1994. Past election years in Malawi were in 1994, 1999, 2004, 2009, 2014 and the last one held in May 2019.

In June 2020, Malawi held a rerun presidential election, following allegations of irregularities in the 2019 presidential election.

- Past elections:
  - Malawian general election, 2019
  - Malawian general election, 2014
  - Malawian general election, 2009
  - Malawi general election, 2004
  - Malawian general election, 1999
  - Malawian general election, 1994

== International organization participation ==
ACP, AfDB, C, CCC, ECA, FAO, G-77, IBRD, ICAO, ICCt, ICFTU, ICRM, IDA, IFAD, IFC, IFRCS, ILO, IMF, IMO, Intelsat, Interpol, IOC, ISO (correspondent), ITU, NAM, OAU, OPCW, SADC, UN, UNCTAD, UNESCO, UNIDO, UNMIK, UPU, WFTU, WHO, WIPO, WMO, WToO, WTrO

== See also ==
- Elections in Malawi
- Cabinet of Malawi
- President of Malawi
- List of political parties in Malawi
- 2007 Malawian political crisis
