= Congress for National Unity =

Political party in Malawi

The Congress for National Unity (CONU) is a political party in Malawi led by Daniel Kamfosi Nkhumbwe.

== History ==
The party was established in March 1999. It contested the June 1999 general elections, nominating Nkhumbwe as its presidential candidate. He finished fourth out of five candidates with 0.5% of the vote. In the National Assembly elections the party ran in 31 constituencies, although Nkhumbwe was its candidate in 27 of them. It received just 0.07% of the vote, failing to win a seat.

The party did not nominate a candidate for president in the 2004 elections. Although it only ran two candidates in the National Assembly elections (Nkhumbwe and Richard Mwaila), its vote share increased to 0.23%. Whilst Nkhumbwe received only 57 votes in the Lilongwe Kumach constituency, Mwaila was victorious in Blantyre West. Prior to the elections Mwaila had left the United Democratic Front after an internal dispute over manipulation of the UDF selection process by the party's eventual candidate Nicholas Kachingwe. However, Mwaila convincingly defeated Kachingwe, taking 40% of the vote in the constituency.

Prior to the 2009 elections Mwalia announced that he would be supporting the UDF, and did not run. Nkhumbwe ran again in Lilongwe Kumach, but received only 92 votes. In the buildup to the 2014 general elections the party joined the Tisintha Alliance alongside AFORD, MAFUNDE, the New Labour Party, the National Unity Party, the MDP, the Republican Party and the Maravi People's Party. Although the alliance nomainted MAFUNDE leader George Mnesa as its presidential candidate, the parties contested the National Assembly elections individually and CONU did not put up any candidates.
