= Zomba Malosa (Malawi Parliament constituency) =

Zomba Malosa is a constituency for the National Assembly of Malawi, located in the Zomba District of Malawi's Southern Region. It elects one Member of Parliament by the first past the post system. The constituency is currently represented by People's Party MP Roy Kachale Banda, who succeeded his mother and former President Joyce Banda.

== Election results ==
Election	Political result	Candidate	Party	Votes	%	±%
Zomba Malosa general election, 2014; 528 spoilt votes Electorate: 33,998; Turnout: 24,829 (73.03%)	PP hold Majority: 7,377 (30.36%)	Akajuwe Roy Kachale Banda	PP	11,321	46.59	
Zomba Malosa general election, 2014; 528 spoilt votes Electorate: 33,998; Turnout: 24,829 (73.03%)	PP hold Majority: 7,377 (30.36%)	Maria Kalambo Kambuzi	UIP	3,944	16.23	
Zomba Malosa general election, 2014; 528 spoilt votes Electorate: 33,998; Turnout: 24,829 (73.03%)	PP hold Majority: 7,377 (30.36%)	Alexander Lawrence Mkumba	UDF	3,717	15.30	-
Zomba Malosa general election, 2014; 528 spoilt votes Electorate: 33,998; Turnout: 24,829 (73.03%)	PP hold Majority: 7,377 (30.36%)	Elizabeth Tselingas	DPP	2,874	11.83	-
Zomba Malosa general election, 2014; 528 spoilt votes Electorate: 33,998; Turnout: 24,829 (73.03%)	PP hold Majority: 7,377 (30.36%)	Madalitso Kasongo	Independent	2,289	9.42	-
Zomba Malosa general election, 2014; 528 spoilt votes Electorate: 33,998; Turnout: 24,829 (73.03%)	PP hold Majority: 7,377 (30.36%)	Grant Lawson Kapolo	PPM	156	0.64	-

Election	Political result	Candidate	Party	Votes	%	±%
Zomba Malosa general election, 2009; 630 spoilt votes Electorate: 25,994; Turnout: 20,328 (78.20%)	DPP gain from UDF; Majority: 8,257 (41.91%)	Joyce Banda (inc.)	DPP	12,432	63.11	
Zomba Malosa general election, 2009; 630 spoilt votes Electorate: 25,994; Turnout: 20,328 (78.20%)	DPP gain from UDF; Majority: 8,257 (41.91%)	Muhammad Kulesi	UDF	4,175	21.20	
Zomba Malosa general election, 2009; 630 spoilt votes Electorate: 25,994; Turnout: 20,328 (78.20%)	DPP gain from UDF; Majority: 8,257 (41.91%)	Lawrence Alexander Mkumba	Independent	3,091	15.69	-

Election	Political result	Candidate	Party	Votes	%	±%
Zomba Malosa general election, 2004; 522 spoilt votes Electorate: 30,032; Turnout: 15,051 (50.12%)	UDF hold Majority: 4,757 (32.74%)	Joyce Banda	UDF	8,502	58.52	
Zomba Malosa general election, 2004; 522 spoilt votes Electorate: 30,032; Turnout: 15,051 (50.12%)	UDF hold Majority: 4,757 (32.74%)	Ibrahim Yusuf Salim Mdala	Independent	3,745	25.78	
Zomba Malosa general election, 2004; 522 spoilt votes Electorate: 30,032; Turnout: 15,051 (50.12%)	UDF hold Majority: 4,757 (32.74%)	Dorothy Gillian Ngoma	PPM	890		-
Zomba Malosa general election, 2004; 522 spoilt votes Electorate: 30,032; Turnout: 15,051 (50.12%)	UDF hold Majority: 4,757 (32.74%)	Buxton Kingston Chinguwo	NDA	726	5.00	-
Zomba Malosa general election, 2004; 522 spoilt votes Electorate: 30,032; Turnout: 15,051 (50.12%)	UDF hold Majority: 4,757 (32.74%)	Robin Mdoka	RP	338	2.33	-
Zomba Malosa general election, 2004; 522 spoilt votes Electorate: 30,032; Turnout: 15,051 (50.12%)	UDF hold Majority: 4,757 (32.74%)	Harry McPherson Mchilima	MCP	328	2.26	-
