= Clement Chiwaya =

Malawian politician (1971–2021)

Personal details
- Born: Clement Terence Chiwaya; 16 May 1971 Mpondasi, Malawi
- Died: 30 September 2021 (aged 50) Malawi
- Party: United Democratic Front

Clement Terence Chiwaya (16 May 1971 – 30 September 2021) was a Malawian politician who served as an MP for Mangochi Central from 2004 to 2019. He was also Minister of Social Development and Persons with Disabilities from 2004 through 2005.

== Biography ==
Clement Terence Chiwaya was born on 16 May 1971. His home village was Mpondasi, located in Mponda Traditional Authority (TA) area of Mangochi District. At the age of two, Chiwaya contracted polio and became paraplegic. He was raised by the Diocese of Mangochi due to his disability.

In the late 1990s, Chiwaya found a Calvin College advertisement offering scholarships for students from Africa. In 1998, he flew to Grand Rapids to enter the college, carrying US$500. When he arrived, Calvin College admissions officers informed him that he would need to go back to Malawi and formally apply for the following year. Chiwaya then sought help from the Diocese of Grand Rapids; they arranged for his boarding and enrollment in Aquinas College. He completed his bachelor's degree at Aquinas College in 2002, with a double major in Community Leadership and Political Science.

After returning to Malawi, Chiwaya entered politics as a member of the United Democratic Front (UDF) party. He was elected to the National Assembly from Mangochi Central in the 2004 general election, holding the seat for the UDF. He was appointed the first Minister of Social Development and Persons with Disabilities a week after the election, and continued in this position through 2005.

Chiwaya was reelected in 2009 and became the Chief Whip for the UDF. After winning a third term in 2014, he became the Second Deputy Speaker of the National Assembly. In 2018, he decided not to run for another term. At the following election in 2019, his former seat was won by Victoria Kingston of the Democratic Progressive Party.

Chiwaya was appointed Minister of Persons with Disability and the Elderly in March 2020, serving until after the presidential election in June.

== Death ==
On 30 September 2021, Chiwaya visited the Clerk to Parliament Fiona Kalemba. He killed himself after not receiving insurance from parliament to pay for damages to his car.

His funeral was held in Mangochi Stadium on 2 October 2021, and he was buried in Mpondasi.

== Electoral history ==
2004 Malawian general election: Mangochi Central
Party	Candidate	Votes	%	±%
UDF	Clement T. Chiwaya	8,456		
Independent	Mahamudu Mahommed Osman	4,332		
Independent	Hassan Hilalie Ajinga	3,428		
Independent	Joyce Mainga Migogo	1,492		
Independent	N. C. Polepole	1,034		
PPM	Frank Jafali Danger	904		
RP	Abbu Hassan Saidih	559		
MCP	Abu Alli Andiseni	517		
NDA	Houstons Auf Sadick	496		
Independent	Issa Bwanali Kasito	144		
Rejected ballots		1,707	7.4	
Turnout		23,068		
Registered electors		40,793		
UDF hold				

2009 Malawian general election: Mangochi Central
Party	Candidate	Votes	%	±%
UDF	Clement Terence Chiwaya Dr.	14,900		
DPP	Victor Issa Malunda	7,946		
Independent	Kusweje Yusuf Makwinja	6,130		
Independent	Hassein Anusa	2,937		
Independent	Joyce Mainga Migogo	1,684		
Rejected ballots		762	0.02	
Turnout		34,359		
Registered electors		45,613		
UDF hold				

2014 Malawian general election: Mangochi Central
Party	Candidate	Votes	%	±%
UDF	Dr. Clement Terence Chiwaya	13,336	33.82	
Independent	Daddy Anussah Hassein	8,954	22.70	
DPP	Victoria Kingston	8,836	22.41	
PP	Macdonald Sylvester Sembereka	4,181	10.60	
Independent	Mustafa A. Tchuwa	2,337	5.93	
Independent	Sadi Chiwalo	925	2.35	
MCP	George Rabson Chimfuti	600	1.52	
Independent	Zione Akusiona Matumba	268	0.68	
Total valid votes		39,437		
Rejected ballots		1,159	2.85	
Turnout		40,596	70.36	
Registered electors		57,698		
UDF hold				
