= Justin Malewezi =

Vice President of Malawi from 1994 to 2004

The Right Honourable Justin Malewezi
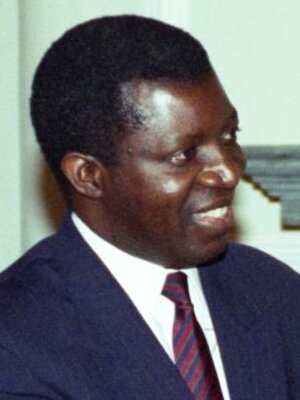
- Justin Malewezi, former Vice-President of Malawi

Vice President of Malawi
- In office November 1994 – June 2004
- President: Bakili Muluzi
- Preceded by: Post established
- Succeeded by: Cassim Chilumpha

Personal details
- Born: 23 December 1943
- Died: 17 April 2021 (aged 77)
- Spouse: Fellista Chizalema Malewezi
- Children: Justin Malewezi Jnr(son); Qabaniso Malewezi(son); Msaukiranji Malewezi(daughter); Tione Malewezi (daughter)
- Education: Columbia University

Justin Chimera Malewezi (23 December 1943 – 17 April 2021) was a Malawian politician and a Member of Parliament for Ntchisi North in the Central Region of Malawi. He was Vice-President of Malawi from 1994 to 2004. Malewezi quit the United Democratic Front in 2004 and eventually represented the People's Progressive Movement in the 2004 general election, in which he garnered 2.5% of the total national vote.

== Biography ==
Malewezi's lifelong career was as a public servant.

=== Education and family ===
He was educated at Robert Blake Secondary School, popularly known as Kongwe in the Central region district of Dowa, where he received his Cambridge School Certificate. As a boy, he was called "Visanza", as Ntchisi is sometimes known (a derogatory name meaning rugs). His father was a schoolteacher. After having graduated with a Bachelor's degree in Biology from Columbia University in the United States in 1967, Malewezi started his public service life as a science teacher.

He was married to Felista Chizalema, a Spelman College graduate from 1967, who for many years was a secondary school maths teacher back in her native Malawi. On retirement she joined UNICEF United Nations Children's Fund (UNICEF) until Malewezi's second year as vice president. The couple had four children, two sons and two daughters, and eight grandchildren. One of the sons is a London-based DJ and rapper, Qabanisso, the Managing Director of Abstrakbeatz, a magazine that promotes hip hop music. Malawezi spent much of his time as an activist on HIV and AIDS issues. He was a contributing editor to the book Poverty, AIDS and hunger: Breaking the poverty trap in Malawi, published in 2006. According to People's Daily, he was also working on a children's book, Grasshoppers on the Moon, and a compilation of essays under the working title "Confessions of a Principal Secretary", where he chronicled his life as a civil servant under the Banda regime.

=== Career in politics ===
Malewezi advanced from teacher to the position of headmaster and, in 1976, he became chief education officer. Before holding the sensitive post of secretary to the treasury, the chief government technical advisor on money matters, he also held posts as permanent secretary in various ministries, including education and health. In 1989, he was appointed secretary to the president and cabinet (SPC), becoming former President Ackim Kamunkhwala Hastings Kamuzu Banda's advisor.

Out of the government, he committed his time to private consultancy from the late 1980s to the early 1990s, advising the governments of Tanzania, Ghana and Lesotho on education and public sector development. Around 1992, he joined a clandestine underground group of mainly former Banda protestors including Elson Bakili Muluzi, Aleke Kadonaphani Banda, Edward Bwanali, Finly Dumbo Lemani and journalist Brown Mpinganjira. The underground pressure group later became the United Democratic Front (UDF) under the tutelage of Bakili Muluzi, and dislodged Banda's Malawi Congress Party (MCP) from its 30-year hold on power, in Malawi's first multiparty elections in 1994. Malewezi was President Muluzi's deputy from 1994 to 2004. Having been sidelined by the ruling United Democratic Front (UDF) as the party's presidential candidate, Malewezi decided to quit the party on January 1, 2004. Malewezi was one of the high-profile figures of the United Democratic Front (UDF) to announce their resignation and openly criticise the party's Chairman for handpicking Bingu wa Mutharika as its 2004 presidential candidate. He was one among the five candidates who contested the presidential election.

Malewezi later joined forces with the opposition, People's Progressive Movement, where he was elected vice president. He attempted to be elected the front runner for the Mgwirizano (Unity) Coalition of seven opposition parties fighting to oust the Muluzi administration during the forthcoming general elections but the coalition chose veteran politician Gwanda Chakuamba instead to lead the Mgwirizano Coalition in the presidential race. After the loss, Malewezi ran as an independent presidential candidate, promising to put the economy back on track and referring to his intelligence and undented background in the campaign. If he entered the race again as an independent, he would have run against economist Mutharika, who had former President Bakili Muluzi as his chief campaigner, Gwanda Chakuamba, the veteran politician who was marshaling the ticket for the Mgwirizano Coalition of seven opposition parties, and Brown Mpinganjira, the former senior minister and Muluzi's right-hand man. Another competitor was John Tembo, the veteran who gained experience in politics with the help of the founder of Malawi, Hastings Kamuzu Banda.

=== Death ===
Malawezi died on 17 April 2021, aged 77.

== Bibliography ==
- Eds. Blackie, Malcolm J., Anne C. Conroy, Justin C. Malewezi, Jeffrey D. Sachs and Alan Whiteside (2006). Poverty, AIDS and Hunger: Breaking the Poverty Trap in Malawi. Palgrave Macmillan Ltd, New York. ISBN 978-1-4039-9833-0.
