= List of heads of state of Malawi =

This is a list of the heads of state of Malawi, from the independence of Malawi in 1964 to the present day.

From 1964 to 1966 the head of state under the Constitution of 1964 was the queen of Malawi, Elizabeth II, who was also the monarch of other Commonwealth realms. The monarch was represented in Malawi by a governor-general. Malawi became a republic within the Commonwealth under the Constitution of 1966 and the monarch and governor-general were replaced by an executive president.

== Monarch (1964–1966) ==
The succession to the throne was the same as the succession to the British throne.

No.	Portrait	Name (Birth–Death)	Reign			Royal House	Prime Minister
No.	Portrait	Name (Birth–Death)	Reign start	Reign end	Duration	Royal House	Prime Minister
1		Queen; Elizabeth II (1926–2022)	6 July 1964	6 July 1966	2 years	Windsor	Banda

=== Governor-general ===
Governor-General's standard

The governor-general was the representative of the monarch in Malawi and exercised most of the powers of the monarch. The governor-general was appointed for an indefinite term, serving at the pleasure of the monarch. Since Malawi was granted independence by the Malawi Independence Act 1964, rather than being first established as a semi-autonomous dominion and later promoted to independence as defined by the Statute of Westminster 1931, the governor-general was to be always appointed solely on the advice of the Cabinet of Malawi without the involvement of the British government. As Malawi became a republic before Glyn Jones, the former colonial governor, was replaced, this never happened. In the event of a vacancy the chief justice would have served as the officer administering the government.

No.	Portrait	Name (Birth–Death)	Term of office			Monarch	Prime Minister
No.	Portrait	Name (Birth–Death)	Took office	Left office	Time in office	Monarch	Prime Minister
1		Sir; Glyn Jones (1908–1992)	6 July 1964	6 July 1966	2 years	Elizabeth II	Banda

== Republic (1966–present) ==
Presidential standard

Under the country's 1966, 1994 and 1995 constitutions, the president is executive head of state.

The first president, Hastings Banda, was elected by the National Assembly and subsequently had himself declared president for life in 1970. He was defeated in 1994, a year after his life term was abolished as part of Malawi's transition to democracy. Since then, presidents have been elected in direct popular elections for a five-year term. Presidents may be elected any number of times, but not more than twice in a row. In the event of a vacancy, the vice-president becomes president for the balance of the term.

Political parties

Malawi Congress Party (MCP)
United Democratic Front (UDF)
Democratic Progressive Party (DPP)
People's Party (PP)

Symbols

^{†} Died in office

No.	Portrait	Name (Birth–Death)	Elected	Term of office			Political party
No.	Portrait	Name (Birth–Death)	Elected	Took office	Left office	Time in office	Political party
1		Hastings Banda (c. 1898–1997) (Note: Served as President for life from 6 July 1971 to February 1994.)	—	6 July 1966	24 May 1994	27 years, 322 days	MCP
2		Bakili Muluzi (born 1943)	1994; 1999	24 May 1994	24 May 2004	10 years	UDF
3		Bingu wa Mutharika (1934–2012)	2004; 2009	24 May 2004	5 April 2012^{[†]}	7 years, 317 days	UDF (2004–2005) DPP (2005–2012)
4		Joyce Banda (born 1950)	—	7 April 2012	31 May 2014	2 years, 54 days	PP
5		Peter Mutharika (born 1940)	2014; 2019	31 May 2014	28 June 2020	6 years, 28 days	DPP
6		Lazarus Chakwera (born 1955)	2020	28 June 2020	4 October 2025	5 years, 98 days	MCP
7		Peter Mutharika (born 1940)	2025	4 October 2025	Incumbent	318 days	DPP
