= Brown Mpinganjira =

Malawian politician

- Born: Brown James Mpinganjira; 7 November 1950 (age 75)
- Other name: Brown Mpinganjira (BJ)
- Citizenship: Malawian
- Education: Chisitu Primary School; Blantyre Secondary School
- Alma mater: University of Leicester
- Occupation: Politician
- Spouse(s): Mimi Maganga, Babra Kalua and Lizzie Lossa, Harriet Moyo.

Brown James Mpinganjira (born 7 November 1950), known as BJ is a Malawian politician. During his 1986 detention he planned with others the end of the then one party state.

Mpinganjira was released in 1991 and he worked for the British Council. He was part of a pressure group that lobbied for a referendum to decide whether Malawi was still to remain a one party state. In the 1993 referendum, Malawians voted for a multi party democracy. In the first multi party elections, Mpinganjira became a Member of Parliament for his home town Mulanje. He served as an MP for Mulanje Central for 15 years. He was a presidential candidate for the National Democratic Alliance (NDA) in 2004 and a running mate in the Mgwirizano Coalition (MCP & UDF) in 2009.

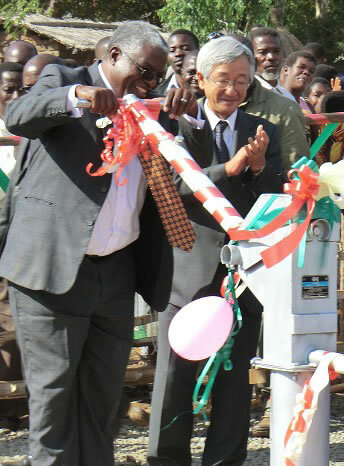
Mpinganjira opens a water borehole with the Japanese ambassador (2013)

== Early life ==
Brown James Mpinganjira was born on 7 November 1950 to Dr James and Ella Mankhokwe Mpinganjira. Ella was a nurse, in Mulanje district, Southern Region of Malawi. Brown was the eldest in a family of nine children. He did his primary education at Chisitu Primary School and his secondary was at Blantyre Secondary School. He then trained as a journalist in Cologne, Germany, and attained his master's degree in mass journalism from the University of Leicester in England.

== Career ==
Brown worked at the state owned Malawi Broadcasting Corporation before becoming a Principle Information Officer in the Malawi Government Information Services Department in 1982. In 1985 he was promoted to Deputy Chief Information officer where he served for a year before being arrested and detained without charges.

== Detainee ==
Mpinganjira was detained in 1986 under the Kamuzu Banda regime when he was the Deputy Chief Information Officer and spent time at Mikuyu Prison in Zomba until his release in 1991. While in prison Mpinganjira, and other detainees planned international intervention to end the one party system. After his release in 1991, Mpinganjira started working for British council. He co founded the then pressure group UDF and campaigned for a multi party democracy. He had an underground newspaper that he titled "nkhani za ku Malawi" which he used to cover the issues of human rights violations in Malawi.

== Political career ==
In 1994, Dr Hastings Kamuzu Banda was defeated and Bakili Muluzi was elected as Malawi's 2nd president. Brown Mpinganjira was elected as Member of Parliament for Mulanje Central and served as a Minister during Bakili's tenure and was known as his right hand man. In May 1994 he was appointed as the Minister of Information, Broadcasting, Post & Telecommunications. His notable achievement during his time in this Ministry was the introduction of a Television station, private radio stations, commencement of cellular or mobile phone in Malawi and the onset of internet services. In July 1997 he was appointed as Minister of Education. In May 1999 after winning a second term as President of Malawi, Muluzi appointed Mpinganjira as Minister of Foreign Affairs up until Jan 2000 when he was then appointed as Minister of Transport and Public Works. In October 2000, Muluzi dropped Mpinganjira from his cabinet and he was arrested on charges of corruption and that he had taken a $731 bribe to offer lucrative deals to his friends when he was Minister of Education. Mpinganjira dismissed the charges as being politically motivated. He said then, that he broke with Muluzi over the latter's attempt to have the constitution changed so that he could run for a third term of office. Mpinganjira was acquitted of all charges in January 2021 as there was no evidence to support the claims. Mpinganjira formed his own party, the National Democratic Alliance (NDA).The party was formed on to fight the third term bill that Muluzi wanted. Mpinganjira and others retaliated that was not the democracy that they fought for and would not allow Muluzi to become another "life president". In October 2001, Mpinganjira was arrested again, this time on charges of treason. These charges were again dropped due to lack of evidence in April 2002. The bill proposing to change the constitution amendment was defeated in July 2002. This is one of Mpinganjira's greatest win.

In the 2004 presidential election, the UDF candidate Bingu wa Mutharika won the elections and Mpinganjira's NDA was placed fourth, receiving only 8.7% of the vote. The party managed to contribute a number of Members of Parliament to the National Assembly among them Billy Kaunda and Mpinganjira himself. Mpinganjira later dissolved the NDA and rejoined the United Democratic Front, a party he helped to found. The party formally deregistered in August 2004.

In the May 2009 presidential election, Mpinganjira (on a UDF ticket) ran alongside Malawi Congress Party (MCP) presidential candidate John Tembo as Tembo's vice-presidential candidate. The MCP and the UDF both supported Tembo in the election. This time Mpinganjira not only lost the presidential race but he lost his seat as MP for Mulanje Central after serving for 15 consecutive years.

After the then vice president Joyce Banda fell out with President Bingu, she and others formed People's Party. Mpinganjira who had not been active on the political scene joined the part and served as Treasurer General of the party and vice president of the party. In April 2012, the president of Malawi Bingu wa Mutharika died, leaving Joyce Banda to take on the mantle as president. Mpinganjira was appointed to serve as Minister of Water Development and Irrigation in June 2013. In September 2013 he was then appointed as Minister of Information and Civic Education, a position he held until May 2014. In the 2004 general elections, Joyce Banda's candidature lost to DPP's Peter Mutharika. In May 2015, Mpinganjira resigned from the Peoples Party.

In January 2018, Mpinganjira was welcomed into the DPP party by President Peter Mutharika at a rally. In February 2018, he was appointed as board chairman of the National Roads Authority. In 2019, two of Mpinganjira's sons, Patrick Matola (Independent, Chiradzulu) and Chipiliro Mpinganjira (DPP, Blantryre Central) were elected as Members of Parliament.

In 2020 Peter Mutharika lost the re-run national election. In the following year Mpinganjira encouraged Mutharika to accept the defeat and move on and support the new President. He was accused of siding the MCP. In 2022 Mpinganjira was among a number of politicians who realigned themselves with the ruling Malawi Congress Party.

== Private life ==
In 2012 it was reported that he had married for the fourth time. The marriage to Harriet Moyo was performed by Shepherd Bushiri. Moyo had been a business and romantic partner for some time. He had previously married Mimi Maganga, Babra Kalua and Lizzie Lossa.

Preceded by Mapopa Chipeta	Foreign Minister of Malawi; 1999-2000	Succeeded by Lilian Patel
