= Robert Chasowa =

Malawian student political activist (1986 – 2011)

Robert Chasowa

Robert Chasowa (March 20, 1986 – September 24, 2011) was a University of Malawi engineering student and political activist. Chasowa was the chair of a student activist group, Youth for Democracy (YFD). The YFD printed a weekly pro-democracy and anti-Bingu wa Mutharika administration newsletter called the Weekly Political Update that has circulation around the UNIMA campus. His mysterious death made international headlines but was ruled a suicide under the Bingu wa Mutharika administration. In October 2012, the results of a commission of inquiry led by President Joyce Banda's administration ruled his death as a murder.

== Political activism ==
Chasowa was the Vice-President of the 'Youth for Freedom and Democracy'. This pro-democracy group was responsible for publishing a weekly campus publication, the Weekly Political Update. This is a student run political newsletter at UNIMA published by activist group. WPU has made several allegations against the Mutharika administration. In a most recent publication, it alleged it had evidence linking Pres Bingu wa Mutharika and the ruling Democratic Progressive Party (DPP) to the arson attack of offices of the Institute for Policy Interaction (IPI) of activist Rafiq Hajat. Chasowa was also affiliated with the group, New Vision Youth Organization group that concerned itself with socioeconomic issues in Malawi and sought dialogue with the President.

=== Play ===
Prior to his death he co-wrote a play "Semo" with Thlupego Chisiza (son of Dunduzu Chisiza Jr) that was critical of the governments human rights policies. The play was performed at Lions Theater in Blantyre by Chisiza and this led to Chisiza's arrest.

== Death ==
The week before his death, plain clothes police officers went to the Polytechnic University of Malawi, to question administrators on the existence of a political pressure group, YFD. The students called this move illegal and contrary to the Kampala Declaration which grants academic freedom. They arrested YFD members, including the President "Black Moses" who is still missing.

On Saturday, September 24, 2011, Chasowa was found dead at the Polytechnic campus with a deep cut on his head and lying in blood. Police have ruled his death a suicide. Police say that Chasowa jumped from a five-story building on September 24, 2011. Inspector General of Police Peter Mukhito noted that he was identified by the leader of the student group, "Black Moses", as the author and distributor of anti-government newsletters which prompted him to commit suicide due to fear. Police say he left a note stating he was killing himself because "politics are dangerous." His sister, family and activists however have noted that there says was a hole under his chin, and that the medical report reported no fractured limbs, only head injuries indicating wounds inconsistent with a fall from a 5 story building.

=== Funeral ===
Chasowa's funeral was held on September 26, 2011 and was attended by thousands of University of Malawi students from Malawi Polytechnic and Chancellor College (Chanco) student union representatives. It was also attended by fired university professor Dr.Jessie Kabwila-Kapasula and Dr. Edge Kanyongolo who gained notoriety in the academic freedom stand off. Dr. Kabwila-Kapasula was dressed in red with a cloth around her mouth to symbolize the silencing of voices of discontent. A red cloth was placed on his grave by Kabwila-Kapasula. Red is the color worn by protesters during the July 21, 2011 Malawi nationwide protests as a symbol of “discontent” among Malawians against the deteriorating social, economic and political in Malawi under the Bingu wa Mutharika administration. The director of religious affairs for the People’s Party (PP), Reverend Malani Mtonga was in attendance. At the home of the Chasowa United Democratic Front (Malawi) national chairman and former Vice-President of Malawi Dr Cassim Chilumpha, deputy secretary general Hophmally Makande, UDF second vice president Humphrey Mvula, UDF director of campaign Davies Chester Katsonga were in attendance.

== Dissolution of Poly Student Union ==
The Polytechnic Student Union was dissolved as a result of the death of Chasowa. The student held an emergency meeting after the burial of Chasowa and resolved to dissolve the Union. Union leaders were allegedly cooperating with the pro- Mutharika 'thugs' which created further tension. Many students have reported receiving death threats and are living in fear.

== Human Rights Groups ==
The Malawi Human Rights Commission investigated his death due to inconsistencies in the cause of death. The police had ruled his death a suicide, and a suicide letter was found, written in block letters as evidence of suicide. However, witnesses at the scene of the crime noted that he had stab wounds on his head.

== Commission of Inquiry ==
President Joyce Banda came into power in April 2012 and vowed to investigate his death through commissioners. The commission of inquiry ruled his death a murder in October 2012.
