= 2007 Malawian political crisis =

The 2007 Malawian political crisis was started when the Supreme Court of Malawi ruled on 15 June 2007 that the speaker of the National Assembly of Malawi, Louis Chimango, had the power to expel MPs who had changed their party affiliation since their election. This ruling was set to have an enormous impact because the incumbent President of Malawi Bingu wa Mutharika formed his Democratic Progressive Party as a split from the United Democratic Front after the last election, meaning that if Chimango expelled most of the DPP lawmakers, Mutharika would lose his majority in the National Assembly, making a move to impeach him very likely. When the possible impeachment was very close in the session of 3 July 2007, about 41 parliamentarians who would have been victim of this so-called Section 65 clause obtained an injunction against the speaker to prevent him from impeaching them; as chaos erupted in parliament, the speaker postponed the session sine die. On 23 July, parliament got together again to tackle the impeachment issue as well as next year's budget; President Mutharika threatened with early general elections. The injunction also expired on that date. Parliament was then suspended indefinitely as there was no agreement reached on 24 July as to how to proceed regarding the 2007/2008 budget; as the interim budget had only been passed until 31 July 2007, however, it remains to be seen whether the suspension is kept up. In another turn, concerned citizens sued the National Assembly for violating their right to development by failing to pass a budget; according to the chairman of the Malawi Law Society, the suit has good chances of being acted on by the High Court. The president started ruling by decree on 1 August, ordering the allocation of funds in lieu of an actual budget. The SADC Parliamentary Forum has suggested it would be willing to mediate in the crisis. On August 7, the chief justice of the Supreme Court issued an injunction allowing the opposition MPs to continue blocking the budget. Critics have asserted that it would take half a year to organise the large number of by-elections which would ensue if all MPs who had crossed the floor were expelled. The injunction was lifted on 8 August, after public protests ensued. On 14 August, Mutharika set a deadline of two days for the parliament to discuss the budget, threatening to "close down parliament" otherwise. The crisis finally stopped on 23 August, when the opposition parties agreed to stop their fight for section 65, stating that it had been misinterpreted as a fight against the budget.
