= Mgwirizano Coalition =

Political coalition in Malawi

- Founded: 2004
- Ideology: Big tent
- Colors

The Mgwirizano Coalition is an electoral alliance in Malawi. At the 20 May 2004 general election, the coalition won 27 out of 194 seats.

Member parties of the coalition are:

- Malawi Democratic Party
- Malawi Forum for Unity and Development
- Movement for Genuine Democratic Change
- National Unity Party
- People's Progressive Movement
- People's Transformation Party
- Republican Party

== History ==
The Mgwirizano Coalition's origins are rooted in a political alliance between the Malawi Congress Party (MCP) and the Alliance for Democracy (AFORD) to unseat the incumbent Bakili Muluzi-led United Democratic Front (UDF). Muluzi's victory in the 1999 general election led to the collapse of the alliance, with AFORD aligning with Muluzi instead. Efforts to reform the alliance didn't occur until 2003.

Opposition parties - organized by Malawian Anglican, Catholic, and Presbyterian churches - in 2003 began to discuss the formation of a coalition that would become the Mgwirizano Coalition. The original talks in November 2003 consisted of:

- Malawi Congress Party (MCP)
- People's Progressive Movement (PPM)
- National Democratic Alliance (NDA)
- Malawi Democratic Party (MDP)
- National Unity Party (NUP)
- Movement for Genuine Democratic Change (MGODE)
- People's Transformation Party (PETRA)
- Malawi Forum for Unity and Development (MAFUNDE).

Neither the MCP nor the NDA decided to join the coalition due to both parties wanting their own choices for presidential candidate to receive backing from the coalition. Instead, the coalition persisted of small opposition parties, which went on to include the Republican Party (RP) in early 2004.
