= Cassim Chilumpha =

Vice President of Malawi from 2004 to 2009

- Chilumpha in 2004

2nd Vice President of Malawi
- In office 15 June 2004 – 19 May 2009
- President: Bingu wa Mutharika
- Preceded by: Justin Malewezi
- Succeeded by: Joyce Banda

Member of Parliament Nkhotakota South
- Incumbent
- Assumed office 19 May 2009
- President: Bingu wa Mutharika; Joyce Banda

Attorney General
- In office 2003–2004
- President: Bakili Muluzi
- Succeeded by: Ralph Kasambara

Personal details
- Born: 29 November 1959 (age 66) Chiutula Village Nkhotakota, Nyasaland (now Malawi)
- Party: People's Party

Cassim Chilumpha (born 29 November 1959) is a Malawian politician who was Vice-President of Malawi from June 2004 to May 2009. Later, under President Joyce Banda, he was appointed Minister of Energy and Mining in April 2012.

== Early life ==
Chilumpha was born in Chiutula Village about 8 Kilometers from Nkhotakota City in the area of Chief Malengachanzi in Central Malawi.

== Education ==
Chilumpha was educated at primary schools within the Chisoti and Nkhotakota LEA schools and subsequently completed secondary education at Nkhata Bay Secondary School where he passed School Certificate Examinations. He then went on to pursue a degree in Law (LL.B) at Chancellor College, University of Malawi. Upon graduation, Chilumpha worked for a year in the Ministry of Justice for the Malawi government before winning a scholarship to study for a Master's and PhD programme in law at the University of Hull in the United Kingdom. Later, he returned to University of Malawi as a lecturer.

== Career ==
Chilumpha is currently one of only five Senior Counsels in Malawi, a standard used to denote excellence in legal advocacy, comparable to King's Counsel in the United Kingdom. At the Polytechnic of the University of Malawi, he rose to the ranks of Head of Business Administration, Dean of Faculty of Commerce, and Associate Professor of Commercial Law. He entered the political arena in the 1980s. He was Minister of Defence, Education, and Justice and Attorney General in the last administration. He is also Minister responsible for water. A member of the United Democratic Front (UDF), he served as a Minister in the administration of President Bakili Muluzi from March 1994 to 2000, then from 2003 to 2004, and again from 2004 to 2006 under President Bingu wa Mutharika. He has served as Minister for the following (in this order): Defence, Education, Justice, Finance, Education, Statutory Corporations and Water. He was the minister of finance from 1997 to 2000. As part of the UDF ticket, he was Mutharika's running mate in the May 2004 presidential election and accordingly became Vice-President on 16 June 2004.

On 9 February 2006, President Mutharika sacked Chilumpha from his post as Vice-President, accusing him of attempting to run a parallel government and claiming that he had attacked the government and seriously undermined its integrity. On 10 February, however, a high court granted an injunction to prevent Chilumpha's dismissal until the Constitutional Court could decide on whether parliamentary approval was necessary for the vice-president to be dismissed.

Chilumpha was arrested at his home on 28 April 2006 for alleged treason and was transferred to custody in the capital, Lilongwe. Chilumpha was accused of conspiring with Yusuf Matumula and Rashid Nembo to have Mutharika assassinated. Chilumpha's lawyer said that he was seeking bail for his client, and the UDF described the arrest as political persecution.

Chilumpha's trial began on 30 January 2007. He said that he was facing political persecution because of his refusal to join Mutharika's party, the Democratic Progressive Party (DPP), and in court he initially refused to enter a plea. Charges against Nembo were dropped. On 26 February, Chilumpha and Matumula pleaded not guilty.

Chilumpha sought the UDF's nomination as its presidential candidate for the 2009 election, but at the party's convention on 24 April 2008, he received only 38 votes against 1,950 votes for Bakili Muluzi. After winning the nomination, Muluzi thanked Chilumpha for presenting a challenge. Chilumpha, however, was critical of the process, and this marked the beginning of his movement away from the UDF.

After five years away from Parliament, Chilumpha ran in the May 2009 parliamentary election as an independent candidate in Nkhotakota South Constituency, although he was still under house arrest. He defeated UDF candidate Fahad Assani in the election. When he was sworn in as an MP for the new parliamentary term, he chose to sit on the government benches. He then stated that he would be interested in joining Mutharika's DPP because the people had endorsed the DPP by giving it a parliamentary majority.

Following Mutharika's death in April 2012, Chilumpha announced on 26 April 2012 that he had joined the People's Party, the party headed by newly installed President Joyce Banda. He was appointed to the Cabinet as Minister of Energy and Mining on the same day.

In 2024 he was again being tried for treason in a reconvened cased led by Judge Ruth Chinangwa. The judge was questioning the high cost of the jury trial.

== Personal life ==
He is a Muslim.
