= Steven Monjeza =

Member of the LGBTQ+ community in Malawi

- Citizenship: Malawi
- Known for: involvement in same-sex relationship case in Malawi in 2009–2010

Steven Monjeza is a Malawian man known for his involvement in same-sex relationship case in Malawi in 2009–2010. Along with his partner Tiwonge Chimbalanga, he became internationally known after he and his partner held a public engagement ceremony and were subsequently arrested, tried, and convicted under Malawi's anti-homosexuality laws.

== 2009–2010 arrest and trial ==
On 26 December 2009, Monjeza and Chimbalanga held a traditional engagement ceremony in Blantyre. The ceremony led to their arrest on charges of "gross indecency" and "unnatural acts" under Malawi’s Penal Code. They were tried at the Blantyre Magistrate Court and, in May 2010, sentenced to 14 years of hard labour.

The case drew widespread international condemnation from human rights organizations, Western governments, and LGBTQ+ advocacy groups. After sustained pressure, Malawian President Bingu wa Mutharika pardoned the couple on 29 May 2010, following a meeting with UN Secretary-General Ban Ki-moon.

== Later life ==
After their release, Monjeza and Chimbalanga parted ways. Monjeza later told reporters he had been pressured into the relationship and subsequently entered a relationship with a woman. The developments led to media speculation and differing interpretations regarding the dynamics of the relationship and the impact of state pressure and social stigma.
