= 1999 Malawian general election =

- 15 June 1999
- Presidential election
- Registered: 5,071,822
- Turnout: 93.59% (▲12.93 pp)
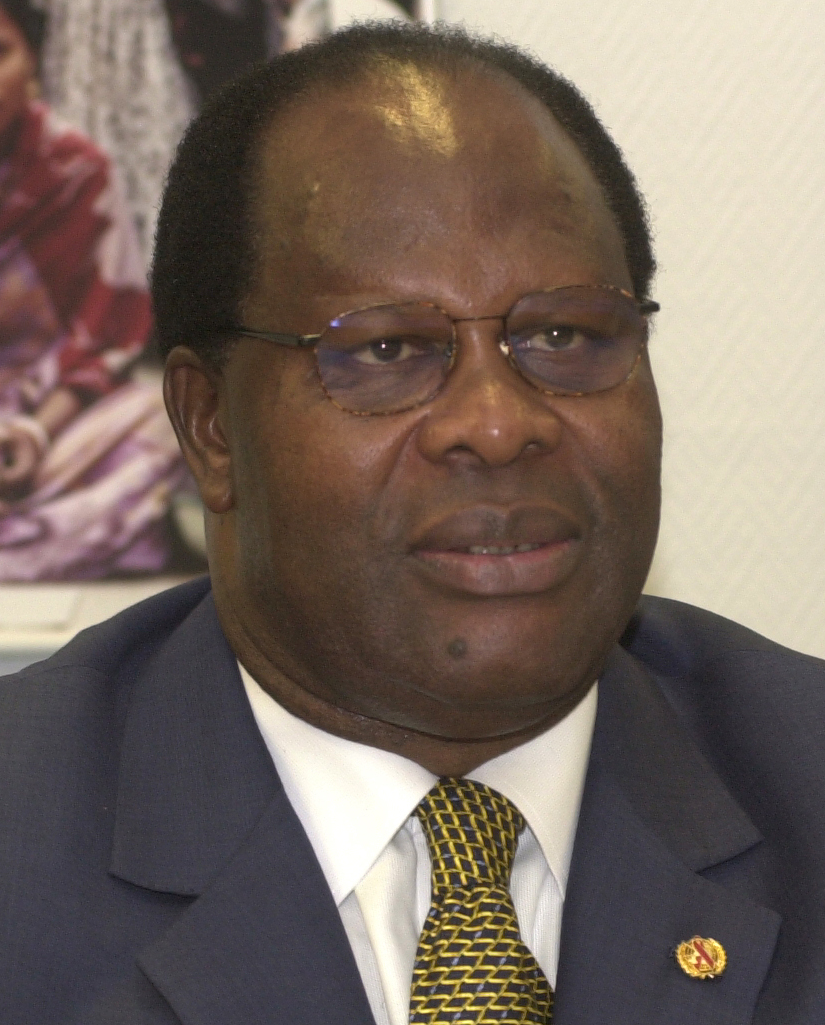

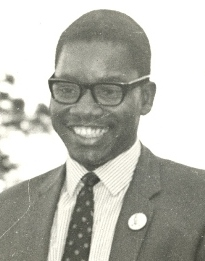
Nominee	Bakili Muluzi	Gwanda Chakuamba
Party	UDF	MCP–AFORD
Running mate	Justin Malewezi	Chakufwa Chihana
Popular vote	2,442,685	2,109,790
Percentage	52.34%	45.21%
- Results by region (left) and district (right)
President before election
Bakili Muluzi
UDF
Elected President
Bakili Muluzi
UDF
- Legislative election
- All 193 seats in the National Assembly; 97 seats needed for a majority
- Turnout: 92.93% (▲13.33 pp)
Party	Leader	Vote %	Seats	+/–
UDF	Bakili Muluzi	47.30	93	+8
MCP	Gwanda Chakuamba	33.80	66	+10
AFORD	Chakufwa Chihana	10.56	29	−7
Independents	–	7.12	4	+4
This lists parties that won seats. See the complete results below.
Results by constituency

General elections were held in Malawi on 15 June 1999 to elect the President and National Assembly. They were originally scheduled for 25 May, but were postponed twice as a result of requests by the opposition to extend the voter registration period. Both votes were won by the ruling United Democratic Front, who took 93 of the 192 seats in the National Assembly, and whose candidate, Bakili Muluzi, won the presidential election with an absolute majority.

In total, eleven parties contested the elections, with 670 candidates. Voter turnout was 94%.

== Results ==
=== President ===
Candidate	Party	Votes	%
Bakili Muluzi	United Democratic Front	2,442,685	52.34
Gwanda Chakuamba	Malawi Congress Party–Alliance for Democracy	2,109,790	45.21
Kamlepo Kalua	Malawi Democratic Party	67,856	1.45
Daniel Kanfosi Nkhumbwe	Congress for National Unity	24,349	0.52
Bingu wa Mutharika	United Party	22,064	0.47
Total		4,666,744	100.00
Valid votes		4,666,744	98.31
Invalid/blank votes		80,021	1.69
Total votes		4,746,765	100.00
Registered voters/turnout		5,071,822	93.59

=== National Assembly ===
Elections were not held in the Mchinji West constituency on polling day due to the death of a candidate.

Party	Votes	%	Seats	+/–
United Democratic Front	2,124,999	47.30	93	+8
Malawi Congress Party	1,518,548	33.80	66	+10
Alliance for Democracy	474,215	10.56	29	–7
United Party	26,257	0.58	0	New
Malawi Democratic Party	11,384	0.25	0	0
Social Democratic Party	7,297	0.16	0	New
Malawi Democratic Union	3,269	0.07	0	0
Congress for National Unity	3,023	0.07	0	New
Sapitwa National Democratic Party	1,372	0.03	0	New
National Patriotic Front	1,149	0.03	0	New
Mass Movement for the Young Generation	708	0.02	0	New
Independents	319,936	7.12	4	+4
Vacant			1	–
Total	4,492,157	100.00	193	+16
Valid votes	4,491,006	95.88		
Invalid/blank votes	192,944	4.12		
Total votes	4,683,950	100.00		
Registered voters/turnout	5,040,240	92.93		
