= Elections in Malawi =

Malawi elects on the national level a head of state and government (Malawi Constitution, 1994 p 27) – the President – and a national assembly. The President and members of the National Assembly, elected simultaneously at a General Election, together form the Malawian Parliament owing to the President's role as both head of government and head of state. In practice however, the National Assembly is on par with the executive and is able to exercise oversight functions through investigations and public hearings on various matters including those involving the executive.

The President of Malawi and the Vice-President of Malawi are elected jointly to a five-year term through universal suffrage. In order to be duly elected, a presidential candidate and their running mate must have more than 50 percent of the total valid votes cast at the election. If no candidate achieves that threshold, a runoff election is organized within 60 days in which the two most popular candidates contest. The provision for a runoff election was first introduced by the Malawian High Court and subsequently backed by the Malawian Supreme Court of Appeal in 2020 following an electoral petition contesting the results of the 2019 elections which resulted in the invalidation of the presidential election.

Parliament, following the recommendations of both courts, then amended and passed the presidential, parliamentary and local government elections act in 2022 which was then assented to by the current President, Lazarus Chakwera, in February of 2023. In addition to provisions for runoff elections, the act also stipulates the precise procedures by which the electoral process from candidate nominations, the campaigning process, to the vote counting and announcement of results. It also stipulates legal remedies for dealing with complaints and potential violations of the electoral process, including outlining the precise powers of the High Court in addressing electoral irregularities. The amended act is currently in force.

The National Assembly currently has 193 members, elected for a five-year term in single-seat constituencies. The Malawian Electoral Commission however completed its belated constitutionally mandated review of constituencies and has recommended to parliament an increase to the membership of the National Assembly in line with population trends, settlement patterns, voter accessibility concerns, and other stipulated requirements outlined in the constitution. The review is likely to be adopted and upheld by parliament.

Malawi is a multi-party system, which means that there are multiple parties as well as a number of independent politicians who do not formally associate with any party.

Malawian citizens who are 18 or over are entitled to vote. Foreign nationals who have lived in Malawi for 7 years can also vote.

== Latest elections ==
=== 2019 Malawian general election ===
General elections were held in Malawi on 21 May 2019 to elect the President, National Assembly and local government councillors. Incumbent President Peter Mutharika of the Democratic Progressive Party was re-elected, with his party remaining the largest in the National Assembly. However, on 3 February 2020, the Constitutional Court annulled the presidential election results due to evidence of irregularities, and ordered fresh elections be held.

=== President ===
| Candidate | Running mate | Party | Votes | % |
|---|---|---|---|---|
| Peter Mutharika | Everton Chimulirenji | Democratic Progressive Party | 1,940,709 | 38.57 |
| Lazarus Chakwera | Sidik Mia | Malawi Congress Party | 1,781,740 | 35.41 |
| Saulos Chilima | Michael Usi | United Transformation Movement | 1,018,369 | 20.24 |
| Atupele Muluzi | Frank Tumpale Mwenifumbo | United Democratic Front | 235,164 | 4.67 |
| Peter Kuwani | Archibald Kalawang'oma | Mbakuwaku Movement for Development | 20,369 | 0.40 |
| John Eugenes Chisi | Timothy Watch Kamulete | Umodzi Party | 19,187 | 0.38 |
| Hadwick Kaliya | Mabvuto Alfred Ng'ona | Independent | 15,726 | 0.31 |
| Total | | | 5,031,264 | 100.00 |
| Valid votes | | | 5,031,264 | 98.54 |
| Invalid/blank votes | | | 74,719 | 1.46 |
| Total votes | | | 5,105,983 | 100.00 |
| Registered voters/turnout | | | 6,859,570 | 74.44 |
Source: Malawi Electoral Commission

=== National Assembly ===
| Party | Votes | % | Seats | +/– |
|---|---|---|---|---|
| Democratic Progressive Party | 1,293,797 | 26.04 | 62 | +11 |
| Malawi Congress Party | 1,108,735 | 22.32 | 55 | +7 |
| United Transformation Movement | 491,845 | 9.90 | 4 | New |
| United Democratic Front | 227,335 | 4.58 | 10 | –4 |
| People's Party | 121,072 | 2.44 | 5 | –21 |
| Alliance for Democracy | 24,212 | 0.49 | 1 | 0 |
| Other parties | 40,209 | 0.81 | 0 | 0 |
| Independents | 1,660,569 | 33.43 | 55 | +3 |
| Vacant | | | 1 | – |
| Total | 4,967,774 | 100.00 | 193 | 0 |
| Valid votes | 4,967,774 | 97.97 | | |
| Invalid/blank votes | 103,174 | 2.03 | | |
| Total votes | 5,070,948 | 100.00 | | |
| Registered voters/turnout | 6,859,570 | 73.93 | | |
Source: Maravi Post, MEC

=== 2020 Malawian presidential election ===
Presidential elections were held in Malawi on 23 June 2020, having originally been scheduled for 19 May and later 2 July. The result of the re-run elections was a victory for Lazarus Chakwera of the Malawi Congress Party, who defeated Mutharika by margin of 59% to 40%.

| Candidate | Running mate | Party | Votes | % |
|---|---|---|---|---|
| Lazarus Chakwera | Saulos Chilima | Malawi Congress Party | 2,604,043 | 59.34 |
| Peter Mutharika | Atupele Muluzi | Democratic Progressive Party | 1,751,877 | 39.92 |
| Peter Kuwani | Archibald Kalawang'oma | Mbakuwaku Movement for Development | 32,456 | 0.74 |
| Total | | | 4,388,376 | 100.00 |
| Valid votes | | | 4,388,376 | 98.71 |
| Invalid/blank votes | | | 57,323 | 1.29 |
| Total votes | | | 4,445,699 | 100.00 |
| Registered voters/turnout | | | 6,859,570 | 64.81 |
Source: Malawi Electoral Commission

== Previous elections ==
=== Referendums ===
- 1993 Malawian democracy referendum

=== Elections ===
- 2019 Malawian general election
- 2014 Malawian general election
- 2009 Malawian general election
- 2004 Malawian general election
- 1999 Malawian general election
- 1994 Malawian general election

== See also ==
- Cabinet of Malawi, Past cabinets of Malawi
- Politics of Malawi
- List of Malawian political parties
- Electoral calendar
- Electoral system
