= 1994 Malawian general election =

- 17 May 1994
- Presidential election
- Registered: 3,775,256
- Turnout: 80.56%
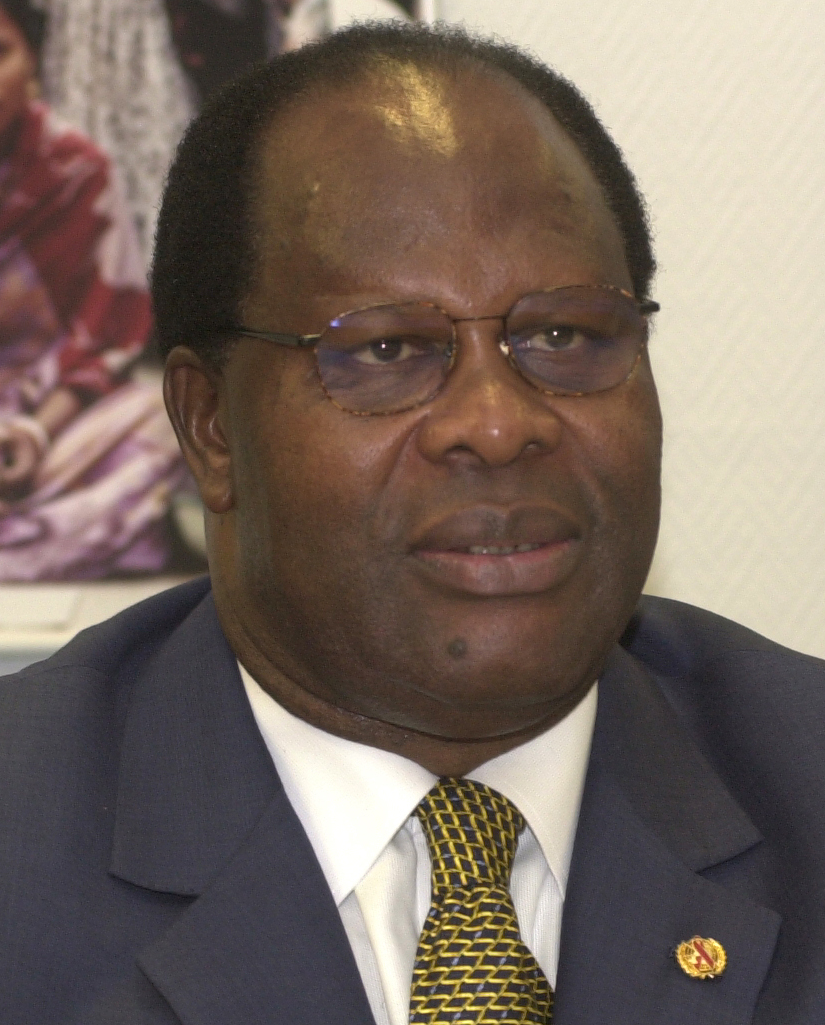

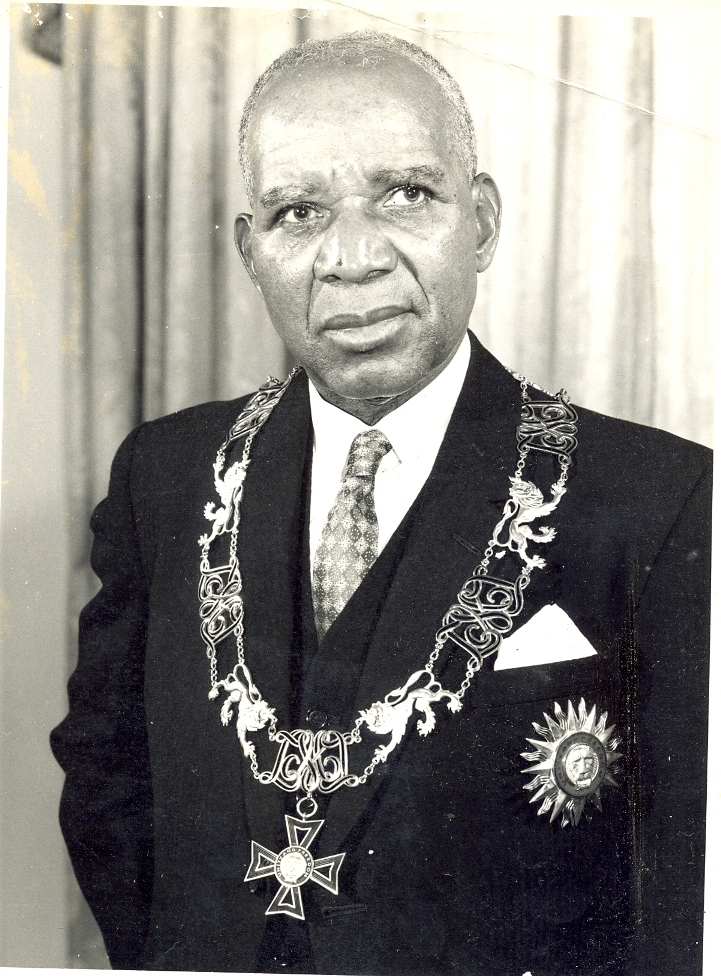
			AD
Nominee	Bakili Muluzi	Hastings Banda	Chakufwa Chihana
Party	UDF	MCP	AFORD
Running mate	Justin Malewezi	Gwanda Chakuamba
Popular vote	1,404,754	996,353	562,862
Percentage	47.15%	33.44%	18.89%
- Results by region (left) and district (right)
President before election
Hastings Banda
MCP
Elected President
Bakili Muluzi
UDF
- Legislative election
- All 177 seats in the National Assembly; 89 seats needed for a majority
- Turnout: 79.60%
Party	Leader	Vote %	Seats	+/–
UDF	Bakili Muluzi	46.38	85	New
MCP	Hastings Banda	33.69	56	−46
AFORD	Chakufwa Chihana	18.97	36	New
This lists parties that won seats. See the complete results below.
Results by constituency

General elections were held in Malawi on 17 May 1994 to elect the President and National Assembly. They were the first multi-party elections in the country since prior to independence in 1964, and the first since the restoration of multi-party democracy the previous year. The Malawi Congress Party (MCP), which had governed the country since independence (from 1966 to 1993 as the sole legal party), was decisively beaten by the United Democratic Front (UDF).

MCP leader Hastings Banda, who had become president upon Malawi being proclaimed a republic in 1966 (he had served as Prime Minister from independence until 1966), ran in his first election since being stripped of his title of president for life in 1993. He was defeated by the UDF's Bakili Muluzi, who received 47% of the vote to Banda's 33%.

The UDF became the largest party in the National Assembly, but was three seats short of a majority. The MCP finished a distant second, and was left with less than one-third of the seats in the enlarged National Assembly.

With the MCP's defeat beyond doubt, Banda conceded defeat two days after the polls closed and promised his "full support and cooperation" during the transition. Reputedly in his mid-nineties, he would have been the oldest elected president in world history had he won.

The election completed Malawi's transition to full democracy.

== Campaign ==
The National Assembly elections were contested by eight parties, who put forward a total of 600 candidates, as well as 13 independents. The UDF won 88 seats, three short of a majority, whilst the MCP finished second with 56 seats. Results in two seats, both won by Banda's MCP, were annulled due to irregularities. Voter turnout was 79.6%.

== Results ==
=== President ===
Candidate	Running mate	Party	Votes	%
Bakili Muluzi	Justin Malewezi	United Democratic Front	1,404,754	47.15
Hastings Banda	Gwanda Chakuamba	Malawi Congress Party	996,353	33.44
Chakufwa Chihana		Alliance for Democracy	562,862	18.89
Kamlepo Kalua		Malawi Democratic Party	15,624	0.52
Total			2,979,593	100.00
Valid votes			2,979,593	97.85
Invalid/blank votes			65,619	2.15
Total votes			3,045,212	100.00
Registered voters/turnout			3,775,256	80.66

=== National Assembly ===
Party	Votes	%	Seats	+/–
United Democratic Front	1,360,432	46.38	85	New
Malawi Congress Party	988,172	33.69	56	–85
Alliance for Democracy	556,457	18.97	36	New
United Front for Multiparty Democracy	9,721	0.33	0	New
Malawi Democratic Party	6,980	0.24	0	New
Malawi National Democratic Party	2,913	0.10	0	New
Congress for the Second Republic	2,118	0.07	0	New
Malawi Democratic Union	323	0.01	0	New
Independents	6,159	0.21	0	New
Total	2,933,275	100.00	177	+26
Valid votes	2,932,395	97.58		
Invalid/blank votes	72,731	2.42		
Total votes	3,005,126	100.00		
Registered voters/turnout	3,775,256	79.60		

== Aftermath ==
Following the elections, on 25 May Muluzi formed a 25-member cabinet, including members of the Malawi National Democratic Party and the United Front for Multiparty Democracy. He left three posts unfilled in the hope that the Alliance for Democracy would also join the government.
