= Ethel Mutharika =

First lady of Malawi

First Lady of Malawi
- In role 24 May 2004 – 28 May 2007
- Preceded by: Patricia Shanil Muluzi
- Succeeded by: Callista Chimombo

Personal details
- Born: c. 1944 Zimbabwe
- Died: 28 May 2007 (aged c. 63) Lilongwe
- Party: United Democratic Front (Malawi)
- Spouse: Bingu wa Mutharika (m. 1984)
- Children: 4
- Profession: school teacher

Ethel Zyauya Mutharika (c. 1944 – 28 May 2007) was the First Lady of Malawi and wife of the President of Malawi, Bingu wa Mutharika. Mutharika was born in Zimbabwe. As First Lady, wa Mutharika was known for her charitable work and had established the Ethel Mutharika Foundation in an effort to help the poor of Malawi. Wa Mutharika died in Lilongwe after a long battle with cancer at the age of 63.

== Personal life ==
Mutharika was born in Zimbabwe. She had been married to President Bingu wa Mutharika. The couple had four children together.

== Death ==
Mutharika was given an official state funeral. Her body was laid in state at the New State House in Lilongwe. Her body was then moved to the cities of Mzuzu on 2 June and Blantyre on 5 June. Her funeral took place at the Mutharikas farm in Thyolo, a tea growing district in southern Malawi. Following her death it was revealed that she had cancer.

=== Funeral ===
Zimbabwe President, Robert Mugabe, led the retinue of foreign dignitaries, who also included Tanzanian President Jakaya Kikwete, Zambian President Rupiah Banda, Botswana and Zambian First Ladies, Mozambican Prime Minister Aires Ali, Swazi Deputy Prime Minister, former Taiwanese Prime Minister, COMESA Secretary-General Sindiso Ndema Ngwenya, ambassadors from Nigeria, Norway and South Africa, Kenyan cabinet ministers and the Zambian-based Chewa King Gawa Undi as well as hundreds of government and ruling party officials and local Malawians. Clergy at the First Lady's funeral called on the country's political leaders to unite in order to honour Mutharika. The ceremony was a rare occasion which brought together political leaders that do not normally see eye to eye. In his sermon, based Luke 13: 6 - 9, Reverend Reynold Mangisa said it was high time political leaders changed and carried on with the unity started by the First Lady's death. "The unity should not end with the mourning period, but we should see it continue," said the priest. Leader of Opposition, John Tembo, who spoke on behalf of the opposition political parties, said the death of Madam Mutharika, which he described a tragedy since it robbed Malawi of the mother of the nation, should serve as a symbol of unity for now and forever. "It is necessary that as a country we be united over this loss and that the unity continues thereafter as that is what is expected of us," Tembo said. Reverend Felix Chingota's eulogy added that Mutharika emulated Jesus and described Mutharika as Jesus who was difficult to be understood by people because of having vision.

=== Mpumulo wa Bata Mausoleum ===
In December 2010, President Mutharika unveiled the mausoleum in Thyolo. This was called Mpumulo wa Bata or Peaceful Rest. The opulent structure was built about 30 kilometres away from the commercial city of Blantyre in Thyolo in her honour. The mausoleum is a work which was "considerably and emotionally conceptualized". It consists of a dome, a gallery and a basement where her body is laid. It also contains some of her belongings. Mutharika noted that it is a national monument to be visited by Malawians as part of national heritage. Mutharika added that the mausoleum was a symbol of forgiveness, unity and togetherness. According to President Mutharika, “No single public money was used in the construction of the monument. Some 2,000 well-wishers from Malawi and abroad funded the mausoleum”. Malawians have dubbed this as the Taj Mahal due to its high cost and extravagance.

Bingu wa Mutharika was laid to rest at the mausoleum in May 2012.
