= National Unity Party (Malawi) =

Political party in Malawi

- Abbreviation: DPP
- Founder: Harry Chiume
- Founded: August 1995
- Dissolved: March 2013
- Merger of: Alliance for Democracy
- Headquarters: Blantyre
- Ideology: Social Democracy

The National Unity Party is a political party in Malawi founded in August 1995 by Harry Chiume. The party was one of the founding parties of the Mgwirizano Coalition for the 2004 general elections.
