= New Republican Party =

Political party in Malawi

The New Republican Party is a political party in Malawi. It was founded by Trevor Hickmon in 2009. In 2013 its candidate for president was Gwanda Chakuamba, who also co-founded the original Republican Party (Malawi).
