= Gwanda Chakuamba =

Malawian politician

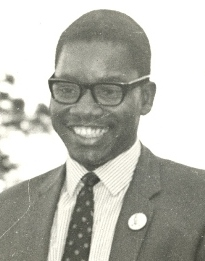
Gwanda Chakuamba

Gwandaguluwe "Gwanda" Chakuamba Phiri (4 April 1935 – 24 October 2016) was a Malawian politician who was the leader of the New Republican Party (NRP). He hailed from Nsanje, a district in the southern part of Malawi. Gwanda Chakuamba attended Zomba Catholic Secondary School, a 2-year matriculation at Sulosi College in Bulawayo Zimbabwe before proceeding to the US to study law though not much is known about whether he did a degree program or a short course.

From the country's independence in 1964 until 1980, Chakuamba was a key figure within the Malawi Congress Party (MCP), which was the sole legal political party. During the rule of President Hastings Kamuzu Banda, he held several cabinet positions and was Commander of the MCP youth group Malawi Young Pioneers.

Chakuamba opposed John Tembo. In February 1980, Chakuamba was charged, on the behest of Tembo and Kadzamira, with sedition and given a 22-year prison sentence. He was released from jail in July 1993, a month after voters endorsed a return to multiparty politics in a referendum.

Upon his release, he joined the opposition United Democratic Front (UDF) but soon returned to the MCP and became secretary-general of the party. In February 1994, the MCP announced that Banda was to be the party's presidential candidate in the forthcoming general election; Chakuamba was the vice-presidential candidate. In Malawi's first multiparty elections, held on 17 May 1994, Bakili Muluzi and his UDF party defeated Banda and the MCP. Banda retired from politics in August 1994 and Chakuamba succeeded to the party leadership.

In February 1999, an electoral alliance between the MCP and the Alliance for Democracy (AFORD) was announced in preparation for the upcoming elections that would take place in May (eventually held in mid-June). Gwanda Chakuamba was chosen as the coalition's presidential candidate while AFORD leader Chakufwa Chihana was selected as the vice-presidential candidate. The move created serious divisions within the MCP because Chakuamba didn't select his political rival and fellow party member John Tembo to be his running mate. Thousands of Tembo's supporters were reported to have mounted protests to demand Chakuamba's resignation.

In the 15 June 1999 elections, Muluzi and his UDF were again victorious, and Chakuamba took second place with about 45% of the vote. Despite declarations from international observers that the elections were largely free and fair, the MCP-AFORD coalition filed two petitions with the high court, challenging Muluzi's victory and the results in 16 districts claiming irregularities. The court later dismissed the claims.

In October 2002, Chakuamba was briefly arrested (before being freed on bail), accused of forging a letter purported to be from Muluzi that offered bribes to members of parliament if they would support his attempt to change the constitution to run for a third term as president.

In the months prior to the 2004 elections, Chakuamba left the MCP and created the Republican Party (RP). The RP joined forces with six other parties to form the Mgwirizano Coalition. Chakuamba was selected as the coalition's presidential candidate. According to official results, he placed third in the 20 May 2004 election, behind Bingu wa Mutharika of the UDF and Tembo of the MCP, winning 25.7% of the vote.

Soon after the vote, before any official results were announced, Chakuamba claimed to have won the election and said that exit polls showing Mutharika in the lead were false. Mutharika was sworn in as president on May 24, although Chakuamba denounced his victory as fraudulent.

In early June, however, Chakuamba dropped his threat to challenge the result and agreed to support Mutharika's government; he did not receive a cabinet position, but three other members of the RP did. In February 2005, Chakuamba was made Minister of Agriculture.

He left the Republican Party and joined the Democratic Progressive Party (DPP), which was created by Mutharika following his decision to leave the UDF in February, and was elected interim first vice-president of the party. In September 2005, he was removed from his post as Minister of Agriculture, and, days later, detained for questioning over a speech in which he predicted that President Mutharika would be out of office by Christmas.

Chakuamba subsequently left the DPP and formed the New Republican Party (NRP). Following the death of Mutharika's wife Ethel in 2007, Chakuamba criticized Mutharika for failing to inform the people of her illness. He initially backed Muluzi, who attempted to run again as the UDF candidate, for the 2009 presidential election. On 26 August 2007, while addressing a UDF rally along with Muluzi, Chakuamba called for Tembo, the MCP leader, to stand as Muluzi's running-mate in the next election, emphasizing the importance of opposition unity to defeat Mutharika. Tembo rejected Chakuamba's proposal two days later.

Chakuamba switched sides again at the time of the May 2009 presidential election, supporting President Mutharika against Tembo, who was the joint candidate of the MCP and UDF. As an NRP candidate, Chakuamba also ran for a parliamentary seat from Nsanje North Constituency, but was defeated by DPP candidate Frank Ellias. The NRP won no seats in the election, and shortly after its defeat, Chakuamba again announced that he was retiring from politics, saying he would focus on farming.
