= Chakufwa Chihana =

Malawian activist and politician (1939–2006)

Second Vice President of Malawi
- In office 1994–1996
- President: Bakili Muluzi
- Vice President: Justin Chimera Malewezi
- In office 2003–2004
- President: Bakili Muluzi
- Vice President: Justin Chimera Malewezi

Personal details
- Born: April 23, 1939
- Died: June 12, 2006 (aged 67) Johannesburg, South Africa
- Party: Alliance for Democracy
- Children: Enock, Nina and Tawonga

Chakufwa Tom Chihana (23 April 1939 – 12 June 2006) was a Malawian human rights activist, pro-democracy advocate, trade unionist and later, politician. He held the post of Second Vice President in Malawi, under President Bakili Muluzi. He is often called the 'father of Malawian democracy'. He served as leader of Malawi's first underground political movement, which urged President Hastings Kamuzu Banda, who had ruled for three decades, to call for a referendum on political pluralism. He was awarded the Robert F. Kennedy Human Rights Award in 1992.

== Early life and career ==
Chihana was born in Mhuju Village, Kawiluwilu, in the Northern Region of Nyasaland (Colonial Malawi). His father died when he was young and he was raised by his mother, an activist for local women. After secondary school, he worked for the colonial government and became active in the 4000-strong Commercial General Union, a Trade Union. In 1958, he became the union's publicity secretary and magazine editor.

The following year, aged 21, he was made secretary-general of the Trade Union. He was active in campaigns involving Malawi Railways and the Imperial Tobacco Group. He studied at Oslo and Dubrovnik universities and received a master's in politics at Bradford University. He worked as a lecturer at the University of Botswana. In 1985, he became a co-founder and secretary general of the Southern Africa trade union coordinating council.

== Political activism ==
=== Anti-colonial struggle ===
Chihana joined the anti-colonial Malawi Congress party (MCP) that was spearheading opposition to the (Federation of Rhodesia and Nyasaland) and to British rule in Nyasaland. By the end of 1963 the federation had collapsed and Kamuzu Banda became prime minister of the newly independent Malawi. As Banda began to consolidate his power after his presidency, Chihana continued to support independent trade unions and political democracy. As a result, Banda dismissed Chihana from the MCP. He was ordered into internal exile and assaulted. He escaped secretly into Kenya, through help from a Roman Catholic Priest. He continued to criticize Kamuzu Banda in Kenya while working as an adviser to the Kenya Federation of Labour.

=== Political exile and arrest ===
He was a dissident during the rule of President Hastings Banda and consequently spent much of the 1970s and 1980s either in detention or in exile. As a trade union leader and pro-democracy activist, Chihana was detained upon his abduction and subsequent return from exile from Kenya in 1970. During his seven-year sentence he was tortured, and spent five years in solitary confinement. A Presbyterian, Chihana was later critical of the church's silence following his detention. However, Amnesty International named him a prisoner of conscience, and was instrumental in his eventual release.

He was released in 1977 but continued to protest against one-party rule. At this time, he traveled to England to study at Nuffield College, Oxford.

=== Work with SATUCC ===
He continued to work with trade unions in southern Africa; in 1985, he became the co-founder and secretary general of the southern African trade union coordinating council.

=== Second exile and arrest ===
In 1992, he returned to Malawi for a democratic conference. There he called Banda's party "a party of death and darkness" and called for a multiparty system. Following the speech, he was arrested and sentenced to two years imprisonment with hard labor for sedition. However, pressure continued to mount, and Banda agreed to a referendum, held on 17 June 1993, in which one-party rule was decisively rejected. Chinana was released four days before the referendum in part due to US Vice President Al Gore, who had summoned the Malawian ambassador to the White House to protest Chihana's detention and call for the introduction of democracy.

== Rise of political parties and foundation of AFORD ==
He was the founder and leader of the political movement Alliance for Democracy which became a political party once it became legal to establish political parties in Malawi. Other parties formed then as well including Bakili Muluzi's United Democratic Front (UDF). In the ensuing general election Banda's party, the Malawi Congress Party (MCP), lost power to Bakili Muluzi's United Democratic Front (UDF), with Chihana's new political party, the Alliance for Democracy (AFORD), placed third. Ironically, in spite of Chihana's prominence as the leader of democracy in Malawi, the leader lost elections to the charismatic Bakili Muluzi who had been living outside of the country. Muluzi became the first democratically elected president of Malawi but appointed Chihana as the Second Vice President under his administration.

== Political career ==
Chihana served as Vice President of Malawi under President Bakili Muluzi from 1994 to 1996 and again from 2003 to 2004. The period saw the political decline of AFORD under his leadership, shrinking to only two seats in the 193-seat parliament by 2006. Chihana also entered into a damaging feud with the Church of Central Africa, Presbyterian, warning them to stay out of politics.

According to The Guardian, he failed to manage the growing food crisis in the nation during his second term, leading to his resignation.

== Death ==
He died after a brain tumor operation in Johannesburg, South Africa on 12 June 2006 at the age of 67. He received a state funeral. He is survived by his wife Christina Chihana, son Enoch Chihana, and two daughters, Nina and Tawonga.

== Awards ==
- Robert F. Kennedy Human Rights Award - 1992
