= 2004 Malawian general election =

- 20 May 2004
- Presidential election
- Registered: 5,752,028
- Turnout: 59.35% (▼34.24 pp)
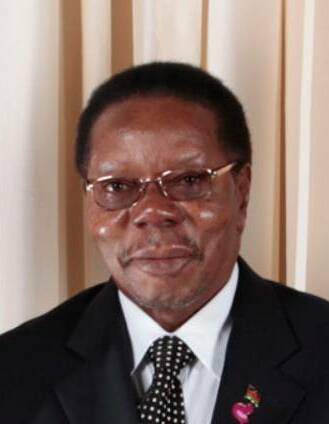

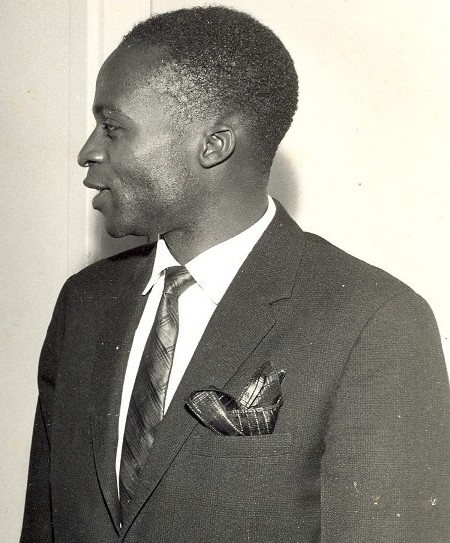

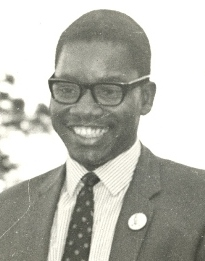

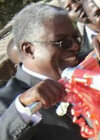
Nominee	Bingu wa Mutharika	John Tembo
Party	UDF	MCP
Popular vote	1,195,586	937,965
Percentage	35.97%	28.22%
Nominee	Gwanda Chakuamba	Brown Mpinganjira
Party	MC	NDA
Popular vote	836,118	286,320
Percentage	25.16%	8.61%
- Results by region (left) and district (right)
President before election
Bakili Muluzi
UDF
Elected President
Bingu wa Mutharika
UDF
- Legislative election
- All 193 seats in the National Assembly; 97 seats needed for a majority
- Turnout: 59.41% (▼33.52 pp)
Party	Leader	Vote %	Seats	+/–
UDF	Bakili Muluzi	25.34	50	−43
MCP	John Tembo	24.85	57	−9
NDA	Brown Mpinganjira	8.12	8	New
RP		7.31	15	New
AFORD		3.61	6	−23
PPM		3.12	7	New
MGODE		1.68	3	New
PETRA		0.67	1	New
CONU		0.23	1	+1
Independents	–	24.23	39	+35
This lists parties that won seats. See the complete results below.

General elections were held in Malawi on 20 May 2004 to elect a President and members of the National Assembly. The election had originally been scheduled for 18 May but was postponed for two days in response to opposition complaints of irregularities in the voter roll. By 22 May no results had been announced, leading to protests from the opposition and threats of disorder. On 25 May the Malawi Electoral Commission finally announced the results of the election. Bingu wa Mutharika, the candidate of the ruling United Democratic Front, was declared the winner of the presidential poll, whilst the Malawi Congress Party won most seats in the National Assembly vote. Voter turnout was around 62%.

== Campaign ==
=== President ===
There were five candidates for the presidential election:

- Gwanda Chakuamba, aged 69, was the candidate of a seven-party opposition coalition, the Mgwirizano Coalition or Unity Coalition. Chakuamba has a colourful past, having been a senior minister and militia commander under former President-for-life Hastings Banda. In 1980 he fell out with Banda, whose assassination he was accused of plotting. He spent 12 years in prison and emerged a popular hero, then succeeded Banda as leader of his party, the Malawi Congress Party.
- Justin Malewezi, Vice-President of Malawi under Bakili Muluzi, stood as the candidate of the People's Progressive Movement, having been passed over by the ruling party.
- Brown Mpinganjira, aged 55, was the candidate of the National Democratic Alliance, a breakaway group from the ruling party.
- John Tembo, aged 72, was the candidate of the Malawi Congress Party.
- Bingu wa Mutharika, a 70-year-old economist and veteran politician, was the candidate of the ruling United Democratic Front, although he had previously run for president under the United Party banner. He was supported by the outgoing president, Bakili Muluzi.

=== National Assembly ===
A total of 1,268 candidates ran in the election of which 373 were independents and the rest representing fifteen parties.

Seven parties contested the elections as the Mgwirizano Coalition; the Republican Party, the People's Progressive Movement, the Movement for Genuine Democratic Change, the People's Transformation Party, the Malawi Forum for Unity and Development, the National Unity Party and the Malawi Democratic Party.

== Results ==
=== President ===
Candidate	Running mate	Party	Votes	%
Bingu wa Mutharika	Cassim Chilumpha	United Democratic Front	1,195,586	35.97
John Tembo	Peter Chiwona	Malawi Congress Party	937,965	28.22
Gwanda Chakuamba	Aleke Banda	Mgwirizano Coalition	836,118	25.16
Brown Mpinganjira	Mary Clara Makungwa	National Democratic Alliance	286,320	8.61
Justin Malewezi	Jimmy Hastings Koreia-Mpatsa	People's Progressive Movement	67,812	2.04
Total			3,323,801	100.00
Valid votes			3,323,801	97.37
Invalid/blank votes			89,764	2.63
Total votes			3,413,565	100.00
Registered voters/turnout			5,752,028	59.35

=== National Assembly ===
Polling in six constituencies was delayed due to printing errors on the ballot papers.

Party	Votes	%	Seats	+/–
United Democratic Front	801,200	25.34	50	–43
Malawi Congress Party	785,671	24.85	57	–9
National Democratic Alliance	256,713	8.12	8	New
Republican Party	231,002	7.31	15	New
Alliance for Democracy	114,017	3.61	6	–23
People's Progressive Movement	98,548	3.12	7	New
Movement for Genuine Democratic Change	53,127	1.68	3	New
People's Transformation Party	21,153	0.67	1	New
Malawi Forum for Unity and Development	11,655	0.37	0	New
New Congress for Democracy	9,545	0.30	0	New
Congress for National Unity	7,410	0.23	1	+1
Malawi Democratic Party	2,494	0.08	0	0
National Unity Party	2,336	0.07	0	New
Pamodzi Freedom Party	363	0.01	0	New
National Solidarity Movement	216	0.01	0	New
Independents	766,137	24.23	39	+35
Vacant			6	–
Total	3,161,587	100.00	193	0
Valid votes	3,161,587	94.97		
Invalid/blank votes	167,376	5.03		
Total votes	3,328,963	100.00		
Registered voters/turnout	5,603,225	59.41		
