= Movement for Genuine Democratic Change =

Political party in Malawi

The Movement for Genuine Democratic Change is a political party in Malawi. At the last general elections, 20 May 2004, the party was part of the Mgwirizano Coalition, that won 27 out of 194 seats.
