= Malawi Forum for Unity and Development =

Political party in Malawi

The Malawi Forum for Unity and Development (MAFUNDE) is a political party in Malawi. In the general elections on 20 May 2004, the party was part of the Mgwirizano Coalition, that won 27 out of 194 seats.

MAFUNDE was part of the Tonse Alliance to support Lazarus Chakwera for the 2020 Malawian presidential election.
