= Kamlepo Kalua =

Malawian politician

Kamlepo Kalua is a Malawian politician. From the Rumphi District, Kalua was the leader of the opposition Malawi Democratic Party from its inception in 1993 until 2012 when he joined people's party. He ran in the 1999 presidential election, where he finished in third place with 1.4% of the total national vote. He is currently vice president of the people's party responsible for the northern region of Malawi. Kalua is a vocal critic of President Peter Mutharika's government. For several occasions, Kalua being a vice chairman of public accounts committee in Malawi parliament has been vocal and accused Peter Mutharika's government of shielding seven unnamed corrupt cabinet ministers. Kalua spent almost the whole 2016-2017 sessions of parliament threatening that he will name and shame the seven corrupt cabinet ministers. However, on 27 April 2017, the Malawi Revenue Authority (MRA) officers accompanied by armed police raided the houses of Kalua and his son Penjani where they seized his Mercedes Benz and a Toyota V8 belonging to the son on allegations that they were smuggled into Malawi. A day later, the police went back to Kalua’s house with their own search warrant and towed a grounded Jeep belonging to the MP on allegations that it was stolen-. The vehicles were returned a week later after Kalua obtained a court injunction. Same week Kalua was reportedly missing, only to be found a week later with hands and legs tied with blue twine strings, but without any trace of bruises. He also was clean shaven with clean clothes and a clean Jacket on his shoulders. This led people to allege that Kalua staged his own abduction. Police threatened to prosecute Kalua for faking abduction.

== Zimbabwe ==
He has criticized the naming of a road connecting Blantyre to Mozambique after Zimbabwean President Robert Mugabe, calling him "an outright dictator".

== Sources ==
- Mugabe defends Malawi road naming BBC News, 4 May 2006
