= People's Progressive Movement (Malawi) =

Political party in Malawi

The People's Progressive Movement (PPM) is a political party in Malawi. At the elections of 20 May 2004, its candidate for president Aleke Banda won 2.5% and the party was part of the Mgwirizano Coalition, that won 27 out of 194 seats. Aleke Banda was the close friend of hastings Kamuzu Banda in 1956. He was among the people who founded the Nyasaland Congress Party. He was also saved as Ministry of Agriculture in the United Democratic Front (UDF) during Bakili Muluzi's time. He left UDF together with Mark Katsonga Phiri and formed their party after there was disagreement with Muluzi about the Presidency of Bingu wa Munthalika.

The PPM was part of the Tonse Alliance to support Lazarus Chakwera for the 2020 Malawian presidential election.
