= Malawi Democratic Party =

Political party in Malawi

The Malawi Democratic Party (MDP) is a political party in Malawi. The party was founded by Kamlepo Kalua and others. At the 20 May 2004 general election, the party was part of the Mgwirizano Coalition that won 27 out of 194 seats. The Malawi Democratic Party individually received 2494 votes.
