= Republican Party (Malawi) =

Political party in Malawi

The Republican Party is a political party in Malawi. It was founded by Stanley Masauli and Gwanda Chakuamba in 2004. At the general election of 20 May 2004 its candidate for president (Gwanda Chakuamba) won 25.7% of the vote, and the party was part of the Mgwirizano Coalition, which won 27 out of 194 seats.

== See also ==
- New Republican Party
