= National Democratic Alliance (Malawi) =

Political party in Malawi

The National Democratic Alliance is a political party in Malawi. At the last general elections, 20 May 2004, the party won 8 out of 194 seats.
