= Bingu wa Mutharika =

President of Malawi from 2004 to 2012

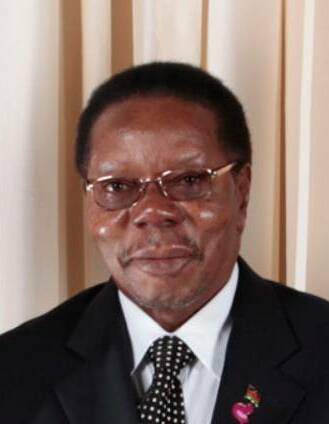
- Mutharika in 2009

3rd President of Malawi
- In office 24 May 2004 – 5 April 2012
- Vice President: Cassim Chilumpha (2004–2009); Joyce Banda (2009–2012)
- Preceded by: Bakili Muluzi
- Succeeded by: Joyce Banda

President of the Democratic Progressive Party
- In office February 2005 – 5 April 2012
- Preceded by: Party established
- Succeeded by: Peter Mutharika

8th Chairperson of the African Union
- In office 31 January 2010 – 31 January 2011
- Preceded by: Muammar Gaddafi
- Succeeded by: Teodoro Obiang Nguema Mbasogo

Personal details
- Born: Brightson Webster Ryson Thom; 24 February 1934 Thyolo, Nyasaland
- Died: 5 April 2012 (aged 78) Lilongwe, Malawi
- Party: DPP (2005–2012)
- Other political affiliations: UDF (1986–2005)
- Spouses: Ethel Mutharika (m. 1984; died 2007) Callista Chimombo (m. 2010)
- Children: 4
- Relatives: Peter Mutharika (brother)
- Education: University of Delhi; California Miramar University
- Profession: Economist

Bingu wa Mutharika (/muːtəˈriːkə/ moot-ə-REE-kə; born Brightson Webster Ryson Thom; 24 February 1934 – 5 April 2012) was a Malawian politician and economist who served as the third president of Malawi from 2004 until his death in 2012 and brother of Malawian President Peter Mutharika. A member of the Democratic Progressive Party (DPP), he served as the party's president from 2005 to 2012, and was also the eighth chairperson of the African Union from 2010 to 2011.

Born in Thyolo District, Mutharika was educated in India and the United States in the 1960s, graduating from the University of Delhi with a master of Arts degree in economics. Mutherika later joined the civil service where he served as an administrative officer in the Governments of Malawi and Zambia, and also worked at the World Bank as a Loans Officer and at the United Nations Economic Commission of Africa, as Director of Trade and Development Finance and as Secretary General of the Common Market for Eastern and Southern Africa (COMESA). In 2004, President Bakili Muluzi nominated Mutherika for the presidency as the candidate for the United Democratic Front (UDF) in the 2004 presidential election, where Mutherika subsequently won and was elected president, defeating John Tembo of the Malawi Congress Party (MCP).

During Mutharika's first term, Malawi's economy experienced steady growth, inflation fell, and the poverty rate declined. In 2005, Mutharika left the UDF following a dispute and founded the Democratic Progressive Party (DPP). A fertiliser subsidy program was also introduced that significantly boosted maize production and improved food security. Democratic governance also increased during this time. All of this won Mutharika public support, especially in the rural areas, and by 2009, he became one of Africa's most popular presidents. In 2009, Mutharika was re-elected president, defeating John Tembo again.

Mutharika's second term was marked by democratic backsliding, declining popularity, economic mismanagement, and increased political infighting. While the economic growth of Mutharika's first term continued early on, the economy started to stagnate and eventually decline. The cost of living in the country started rising, as well as shortages of fuel, electricity, water, and foreign exchange, along with increasing tension with international donors. Mutharika also faced criticism for increasingly authoritarian governance and behaviour. Tensions in the DPP also grew between Mutharika and some party members, most notably his vice president, Joyce Banda, whom Mutharika tried firing many times from 2010, which eventually grew after she refused to endorse Mutharika's brother, Peter, to succeed him. Banda was eventually kicked out of the party and she founded the People's Party. In 2011, public discontent with the government grew and protests occurred due to the cost of living crisis, which Mutharika used security forces to crack down, allegedly killing 19 and injuring 58.

In April 2012, Mutharika died after a short illness, thus becoming the first Malawian head of state to die in office. After his death, Banda was sworn in as president with the support of the military according to the law. While Mutharika is praised for strengthening democratic governance and growing the economy earlier in his presidency, he is also criticised for his increasing authoritarian style of governance, suppressing of dissents and for the economic crisis later on.

== Early life and career ==
Bingu wa Mutharika was born Brightson Webster Ryson Thom on 24 February 1934 in the village of Kamoto in Thyolo District, and is a member of the Lomwe ethnic group. Mutharika's parents were teachers. Ryson Thom Mutharika and Eleni Thom Mutharika were both members of the Church of Scotland Mission which later became Church of Central Africa, Presbyterian. His father was a teacher for 37 years and his mother taught the women of the Mvano group.

Upon completing his primary education at Ulongwe Mission and Chingoli, Mulanje, Ntambanyama, Malamulo, in Thyolo and Henri Henderson Institute in Blantyre, Mutharika obtained a Grade A Cambridge Overseas School Leaving Certificate at Dedza Secondary School in 1956. After that, he joined the Nyasaland civil service. In 1964, he was one of the 32 Malawians selected by Hastings Kamuzu Banda (President of Malawi 1961–1994) to travel to India on an Indira Gandhi scholarship for 'fast track' diplomas. The BBC reports that he went to India to "escape then President Hastings Banda's crackdown on political opponents". At some point during the 1960s, he also changed his name, to Bingu wa Mutharika. In India, Mutharika earned B.Com (hons) degree from the Shri Ram College of Commerce and graduated with an M.A. degree in economics from the Delhi School of Economics of Delhi University. He later obtained a PhD degree in development economics from Pacific Western University. Mutharika also completed short courses on business management, financial analysis, trade promotion, political leadership, regional economic co-operation and human relations. In the early 1990s, he was one of the first to be employed at the Preferential Trade Area of East and Central Africa (PTA) and became its secretary-general in 1991.

Mutharika served in the Malawi civil service. He served as an administrative officer in the Government of Malawi, and also in Zambia. He was offered the deputy governorship of the Reserve Bank of Malawi and appointed Minister of Economic Planning and Development in 2002.

He also worked at the World Bank as a Loans Officer and at the United Nations Economic Commission of Africa, as Director of Trade and Development Finance and as Secretary General of the Common Market for Eastern and Southern Africa (COMESA), covering 22 member states.

== Presidential campaigns (1999–2009) ==
=== Nomination ===
Mutharika was nominated by President Muluzi as his successor. Mutharika won the presidential election on 20 May 2004, ahead of John Tembo and Gwanda Chakuamba, and took office a few days later.

On 7 October 2006, Mutharika stated his intention to seek re-election in the 2009 presidential election as the DPP candidate. Two years later, in October 2008, the DPP's national governing council unanimously chose Mutharika as the party's candidate for the 2009 election, which he won with 66.7% of the vote.

=== First term ===
During President Mutharika's first term in office (2004–2008), the country achieved a high rate of agricultural production and food security. The President's initiatives, centred on a programme of agricultural subsidy, benefited approximately 1,700,000 resource poor smallholder farmers. In the 2005/2006 crop season, Malawi achieved a food surplus of more than 500,000 metric tons. During the 2008/2009 planting season, food surpluses topped 1.3 million metric tons. This agricultural policy was widely regarded as successful but expensive, and was curtailed in 2011.

=== Second term ===
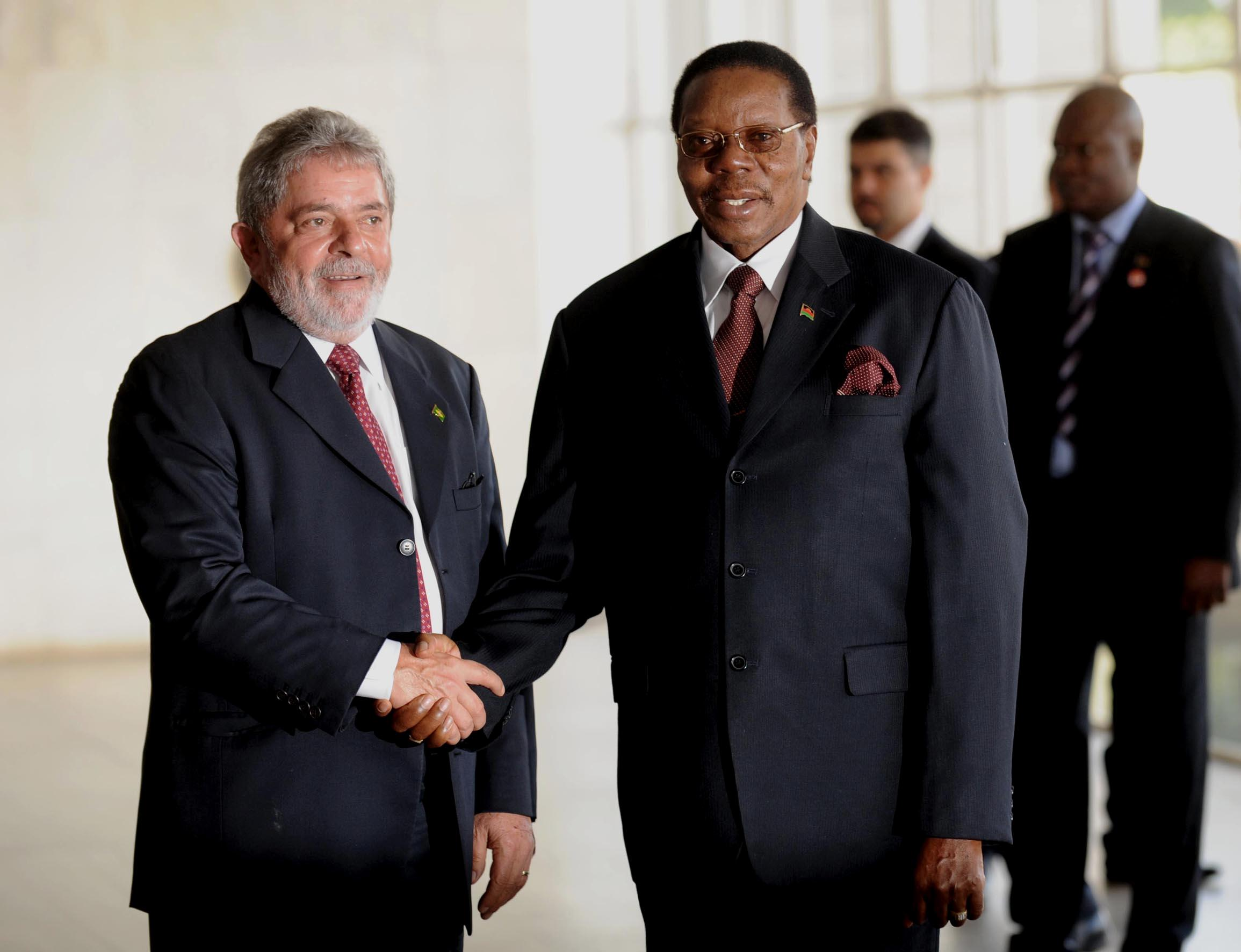
Luiz Inácio Lula da Silva, president of Brazil (left) with Bingu wa Mutharika (right)

Under his tenure, the constitutionally enshrined human rights and separation of powers were enhanced, including legal reform. His first term was seen as a broad political success. He has also been credited with committing to and presiding over economic reform, fiscal restraint and anti-corruption measures. During his tenure, the election was recognised by monitors as fair. Mutharika's Malawi Growth and Development Strategy for 2006–2011 prioritised the enhancement of: agriculture and food security, education, transport, energy generation, rural development, irrigation and water development, youth development and anti-corruption initiatives.

In 2009, Malawi's Ministry of Finance estimated that during the previous four years the share of Malawians living below the poverty line fell from 52 per cent to 40 per cent. This has been attributed to the country's agricultural policies, which have been seen as pioneering in the context of African economic development.

In addition to championing food security in Malawi, Mutharika promoted a similar approach for Africa. While Chairman of the African Union in 2010, the President laid down a plan for Africa to achieve sustainability and food security. He proposed a new partnership with other African nations, which he called the "African Food Basket", outlining a strategy incorporating subsidies to small farmers, especially women, improvements in irrigation, and improving agriculture and food security over 5 years through innovative interventions that comprise subsidies, increased budgetary allocations, private sector investment and affordable information and communications technology. Approximately half of the country's subsistence farmers received vouchers which provided discounts on maize seed and fertiliser. To sustain the program, the Malawi Government allocated 11 per cent of its budget for 2010/2011 to agriculture, continuing a rare record of commitment on this scale in Africa. The level of investment in the programme was reduced in 2011.

Mutharika was accused of trying to sideline and isolate his vice-president, Joyce Banda. He expelled her from the party in 2010 because she refused to accept the nomination of Peter Mutharika as the next president. She remained vice-president of the country because there had been no formal impeachment process.

As a result of the Cochrane-Dyet 2011 cable controversy that accused Mutharika of being increasingly 'arrogant' and 'autocratic', he expelled the British High Commissioner.

In international relationships, his close relationships with Robert Mugabe of Zimbabwe and Omar al-Bashir of Sudan were controversial.

In 2011, days of nationwide protests occurred, sparked by worsening fuel shortages, rising prices and high unemployment. Malawi's health ministry confirmed 18 deaths in the northern cities of Karonga and Mzuzu as a result of police using live ammunition to quell protests. Mutharika was unapologetic and said that he would "smoke out" all his enemies. This was accompanied by a crack-down on Malawian journalists, human rights activists, and lawyers, including Ralph Kasambara. Other events that marred his presidency were the activities surrounding the 2011 academic freedom stand-off between the President and University, and the death of student activist Robert Chasowa.

== Chairman of the African Union ==
On 31 January 2010, Mutharika replaced Muammar al-Gaddafi as chairman of the African Union after Gaddafi's attempt to run as the African Union chairman for an additional year failed. Mutharika was Malawi's first head of state to assume the position of chairman. In his acceptance speech he said that "Africa is not a poor continent, but the African population are poor" and called for "Africa to develop Africa". He shared his vision for the African Food Basket Initiative by making food security a priority in his agenda.

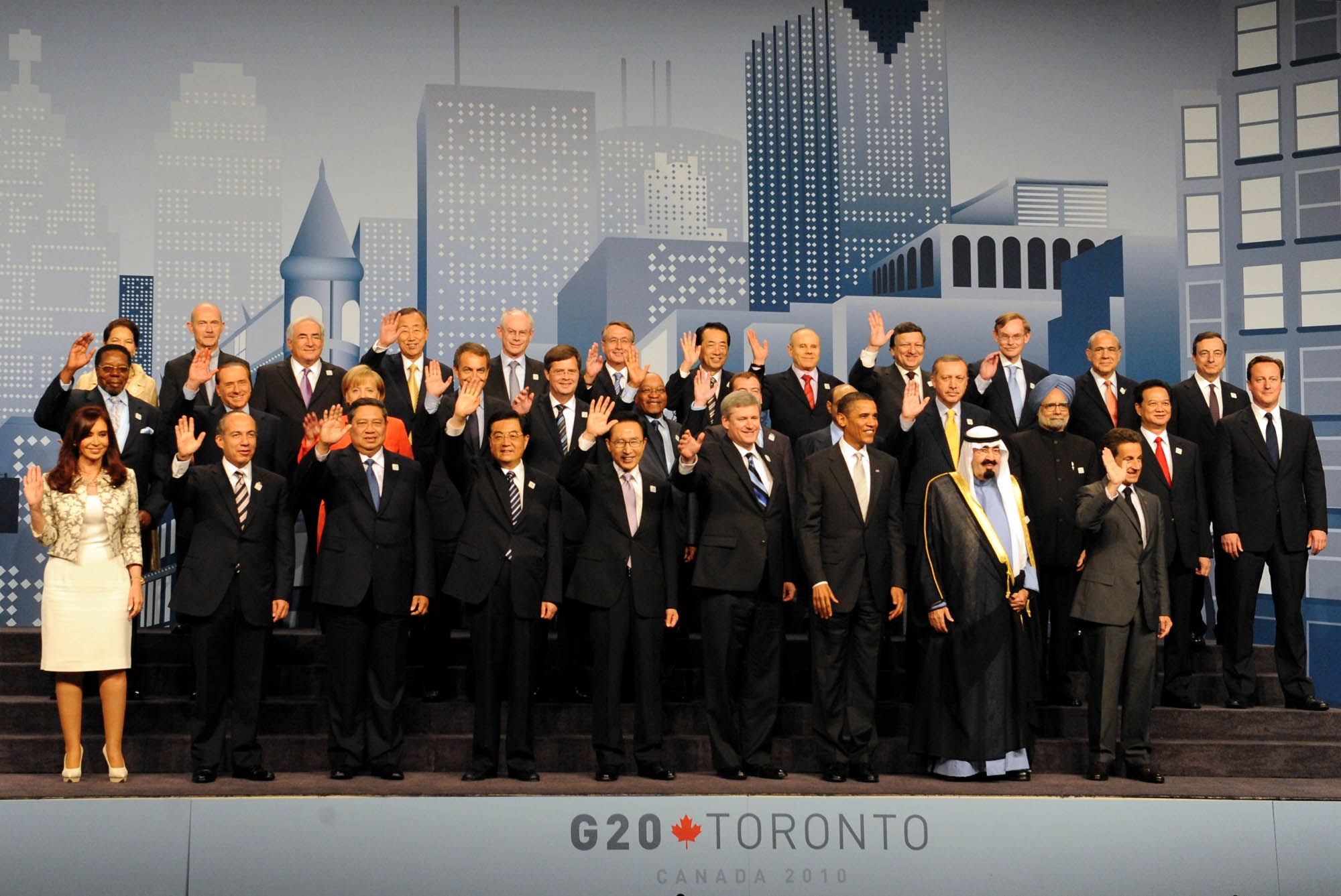
G20 summit

On 4 April he attended the 50th anniversary in celebration of Senegalese independence as the African Union chairman. He also attended the G8 summit in Canada and the G20 summit in Seoul, South Korea.

On 26 July, he attended the African Union summit in Kampala, Uganda, where he condemned the International Criminal Court (ICC) for issuing a warrant to arrest Omar al Bashir because it undermined African authority. They adopted the African Food Basket Initiative here which was presented to the UN on 29 September. On 6 September, he attended the inauguration of Rwandan President Paul Kagame. He attended the Iran-Africa Conference, which aimed at strengthening ties between Iran and African countries. During a speech at Boston University, Mutharika defended his subsidy program and noted that although Western countries say African governments should not subsidise agriculture, Western governments subsidise their own farmers. Malawi hosted Africa's first conference that brought together Ministers of Agriculture in Africa where they were urged to fight for subsidies in agriculture. He did not attend the Africa-EU Trade summit in Libya but no official reason was provided for this move. During his tenure, he joined international calls for Laurent Gbagbo to accept defeat following the 2010 Ivorian presidential election.

== Family and personal life ==
Mutharika was born and baptised in the Presbyterian denomination, later converting to Roman Catholicism. He married Zimbabwean Ethel Zvauya Mutharika, with whom he had four children. Ethel Mutharika died on 28 May 2007. In 2010, Mutharika announced he planned to marry Callista Chimombo, a former Minister of Tourism. The two were married on 1 May 2010.

Mutharika's brother, Peter Mutharika, was a lecturer at Washington University in St. Louis. In May 2009, he was elected to the Malawian Parliament, and was subsequently appointed to the Malawi Cabinet as Minister of Justice and Constitutional Affairs. He has held other cabinet positions. He became the 5th President of Malawi, following the 2014 General election in which he garnered 36% of the national vote and represented the DPP, and after losing reelection in 2020, was elected president again in 2025.

== Death ==
Mutharika died on 5 April 2012 at the age of 78. He suffered a heart attack and was reportedly flown to a South African hospital due to power outages in Lilongwe. The media reported "chaotic scenes" after his wife, Callista, and other cabinet members were leaving the hospital. His condition was initially announced as "critical", and police were deployed throughout the capital with 15 Army officers posted at the Vice-President's residence.

His death was officially confirmed on 7 April, the day Joyce Banda was sworn in as Malawi's first female president despite controversy following Information and Civic Education Minister Patricia Kaliati's statement that "the conduct of the honourable Joyce Banda in forming her own opposition party precludes her from being eligible to succeed the presidency," while the country's security forces also wanted the constitutional order to prevail.

The former U.S. ambassador to Tanzania Charles Stith said of Mutharika that he was "unwavering in his commitment to improve the plight of Malawi's poor" and that he was "one of Africa's most courageous and conscientious leaders."

== Titles, honours and awards ==
Mutharika received the following awards:

- The United Nations Special Millennium Development Goal Award (2010) for success towards eliminating hunger by enhancing food security ahead of the 2015 MDG deadline (Goal 1 – ending poverty and hunger)
- COMESA Distinguished Award (2010) for exceptional leadership and distinguished service to COMESA and the integration of Africa as Secretary General of COMESA from 1991 to 1997. The Authority specifically commended Mutharika for his contribution to the realisation of the Abuja Treaty objectives towards African integration.
- Southern Africa Trust Drivers of Change Award (2009) for changing Malawi from a country in perpetual food deficit to one that is entirely food-sufficient. "The boom in this sector has had a direct impact on millions of poor people. Under his leadership, poverty has declined from 58 to 42 percent in five years. Through his direct involvement in turning Malawi's future around, he is building new confidence and hope amongst the citizens of Africa in their governments."
- 2009 Medal of Glory Awards – "President Mutharika was chosen for the award because of his bold reforms that have resulted in the Malawi green revolution, and Malawi's increase in its economic growth rate from less than 1 percent in 2003, before he took office to more than 9.7 percent in 2008, at the end of his first term office"
- The Most Excellent Grand Commander (MEGC) – Top most award of Malawi order of National Achievement conferred by the Malawi Civilian Honours and Decorations, 6 July 2009
- Inaugural Food Agriculture and Natural resources Policy Analysis Network (FANRPAN) Food Security Policy Leadership Award (2008), "for his agricultural policy interventions which have transformed Malawi form a food deficit nation to a net maize exporter"
- FAO's Agricola Medal (2008) in honour of "his substantial contribution towards transforming the country's economy form a state of food deficit nation to a net exporter of maize"
- Louise Blouin Foundation Award for Exceptional Creative Achievement (2008) for making a positive impact on a global scale
- Danish Government Award of recognition for outstanding performances in promoting gender equality and women empowerment (2008)
- The Order of Brilliant Jade with Gran Cordon was given to Mutharika by President of the Republic of China Chen Shui-bian in January 2005.

Mutharika received several honorary degrees including Professor of Economics by East China Normal University, in April 2010; Doctor of Letters (D.Lilkmktt) Degree Honoris Causa by the University of Delhi in October 2010; Doctor of Law (PhD Degree (Honoris Causa), Mzuzu University, in 2008 and Doctor of Philosophy (PhD) Degree (Honoris Causa), University of Strathclyde, Scotland in 2005.

He was the founder and chairman of the Bineth Trust – a nonprofit organisation promoting education; founder of the Silvergrey International; and founder and Chairman of the Bingu Silvergrey Foundation of the elderly and retired persons. He is also the founder of the Malawi University of Science and Technology, the Lilongwe University of Agriculture and Natural Resources; University of Cotton Research at Bangula; the University of Marine biology; the University of Mombera and the University of Nkhotakota.

Political offices
| Preceded by Bakili Muluzi | President of Malawi; 2004–2012 | Succeeded by Joyce Banda |
Diplomatic posts
| Preceded by Muammar Gaddafi | Chairperson of the African Union; 2010–2011 | Succeeded by Teodoro Obiang Nguema Mbasogo |
