= Bakili Muluzi =

President of Malawi from 1994 to 2004

His Excellency Elson Bakili Muluzi
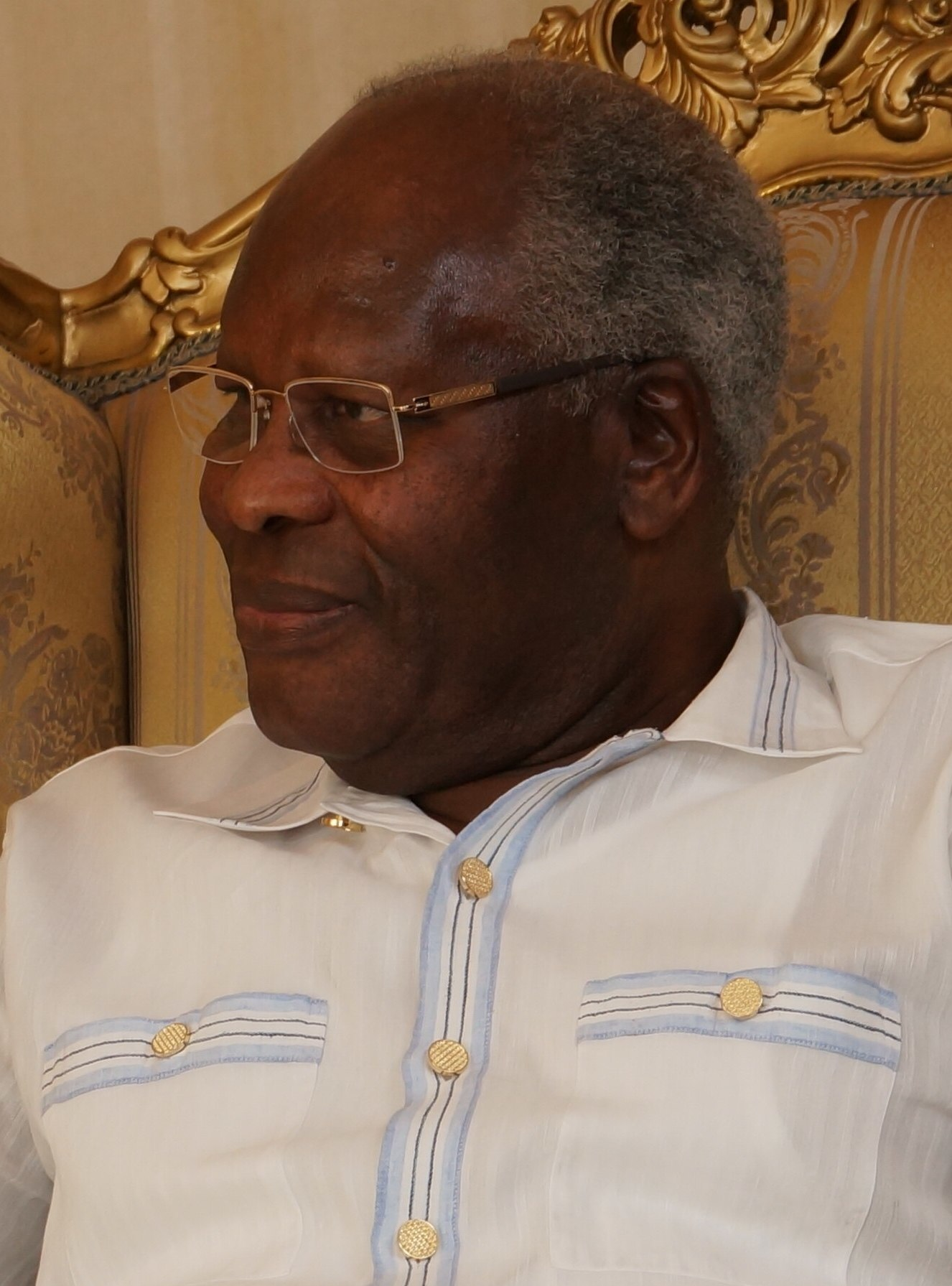
- Muluzi in 2019

2nd President of Malawi
- In office 24 May 1994 – 24 May 2004
- Vice President: Justin Malewezi and Chakufwa Chihana
- Preceded by: Hastings Banda
- Succeeded by: Bingu wa Mutharika

Personal details
- Born: 17 March 1943 (age 83) Machinga, Nyasaland
- Party: Malawi Congress Party (before 1992); UDF (1992–present)
- Spouse(s): Annie Chidzira Muluzi (divorced) Patricia Fukulani (m. 1987; div. 2011)
- Children: 7, including Atupele
- Website: bakilimuluzi.com

Elson Bakili Muluzi (born 17 March 1943) is a Malawian politician who was President of Malawi from 1994 to 2004. He was also chairman of the United Democratic Front (UDF) until 2009. He succeeded Hastings Kamuzu Banda as Malawi's president. He also served in Banda's cabinet as minister without portfolio, before retiring in 1980.

Muluzi served as a minister in various ministerial portfolios and as secretary general of MCP for years until he was dismissed for abusing MCP party funds.

== Presidency ==
Muluzi was the candidate of the opposition UDF in the May 1994 presidential election, the country's first multiparty election. He won the election with 47% of the vote, defeating Malawi's leader since independence, Hastings Kamuzu Banda. There was no provision for a runoff election in Malawi, so this was enough for him to end Banda's 33-year rule (dating back to when Malawi was still a British colony called Nyasaland).

He was re-elected in June 1999, taking 52.4% of the vote and defeating challenger Gwanda Chakuamba who was the leader of the opposition movement. In 2002 he proposed an amendment to Malawi's constitution that would have allowed him to run for a third term, but this was abandoned in the face of demonstrations against him, as well as vigorous opposition from the legislature and courts. After serving two terms, he therefore handed over power to his successor after the May 2004 election, in which UDF candidate Bingu wa Mutharika (who was handpicked and groomed by Muluzi) was elected to succeed Muluzi as president.

Muluzi came to lead the UDF after leaving the Banda government, and he became an advocate for democracy. Muluzi's time as president was marred by controversy and scandal, particularly due to the sale of Malawi's reserves of maize to other countries shortly before the onset of a drought, which resulted in famine throughout the country. Despite international pressure, the millions of dollars realized from the sale of Malawi's food reserves have never been turned over, and it is widely suspected that it wound up in foreign accounts belonging to Muluzi and his supporters.

== Post-presidency ==
Even with the controversy and questionable dealings, Muluzi was a popular leader, particularly in the southern part of the country. He remained the chairman of the UDF. After a dispute with his successor as president, Mutharika, the latter left the UDF and formed his own party, the Democratic Progressive Party (DPP), in February 2005. In April 2005, Muluzi apologized to Malawians for choosing Mutharika as his successor "and imposing him on the country".

On July 27, 2006, Muluzi was arrested on fraud and corruption charges; he was released on bail later that day. Hours after his arrest, the chief investigator Gustav Kaliwo was suspended by President Mutharika; Director of Public Prosecutions Ishmael Wadi said he had no choice but to drop the charges. Muluzi was once more arrested on 26 February 2009 and initially charged with 86 counts of corruption and abuse of office. The charges claimed that he had allegedly diverted 1.7 billion Malawi Kwacha (US$11m) of donor money into his personal account, funds that came from, among others, the Republic of China, the Kingdom of Morocco, and Libya.

As a former Commonwealth leader, Muluzi was invited by the Commonwealth Secretary-General to chair the Commonwealth Observer Group which observed the 2012 general election in Lesotho.

=== 2009 presidential candidacy ===
In early March 2007, with many prominent members of the UDF calling for Muluzi to run for president in 2009, the party said that he would have until March 11 to declare whether he intended to run. Accordingly, on that date Muluzi announced that he would seek the party's nomination as its presidential candidate. The question of whether Muluzi is eligible to run again has raised some controversy. Because the constitution refers to a limit of two consecutive terms, this could be regarded as enabling Muluzi to run again after being out of office for a term.

The Chairman of the Anti-Corruption Bureau (ACB), Alex Nampota, announced on March 17, 2008, that the ACB intended to prosecute Muluzi for allegedly diverting about 11 million dollars of donor money into his personal account; Nampota said that the ACB had asked the courts to lift an injunction that prevented it from questioning Muluzi. Kennedy Makwangwala, the Secretary-General of the UDF, denounced this as "political persecution".

On April 24, 2008, a UDF convention chose Muluzi as the party's 2009 presidential candidate. He received 1,950 votes against 38 for Vice-president Cassim Chilumpha.

On March 20, 2009, the Malawi Electoral Commission passed a judgement to bar Bakili Muluzi from running for the presidency for the third time. Muluzi challenged this, but on May 16, only three days before the election, the Constitutional Court of Malawi ruled that Muluzi could not run again. By that point, Muluzi and the UDF had thrown their support behind the candidacy of John Tembo, the president of the Malawi Congress Party (MCP).

Muluzi announced on December 23, 2009, that he was retiring from active politics and that Friday Jumbe was replacing him as UDF leader.

=== 2008 arrest ===
After Mutharika formed the DPP in 2005, over 70 Members of Parliament joined the DPP; the opposition, including the UDF, has sought to have these MPs expelled from their seats for switching parties. In May 2008, Mutharika said that Muluzi was trying to remove him from office by depriving the DPP MPs of their seats; to press its demand for the removal of the DPP MPs, the opposition had refused to debate any government bills. Mutharika called Muluzi a "coward" and accused him of treason. Speaking on Joy Radio, a station he owns, on May 12, 2008, Muluzi denied any plot against Mutharika and expressed exasperation with threats made by Mutharika.

Eight prominent associates of Muluzi were arrested shortly afterward in connection with the alleged plot to overthrow Mutharika; an arrest warrant was also issued for Muluzi, who was in the United Kingdom at the time on holiday. In connection with the investigation into this alleged plot, police attempted to search Muluzi's home on May 14, but his guards barred them from entry. According to an aide to Muluzi, Humphrey Mvula, the police said that they wanted to remove guns from the home, but Mvula said that these guns had been issued by the police themselves for Muluzi's protection. On the same day, Muluzi said on Joy Radio that he would return to Malawi from the United Kingdom regardless of the alleged plot. By May 25, all but one of the eight arrested associates of Muluzi had been released on bail.

When Muluzi returned on May 25, 2008, he was arrested at the airport in Lilongwe. Muluzi had planned to address a UDF rally upon his arrival, and police surrounded the stadium where the rally was to be held. Thousands of infuriated supporters of Muluzi clashed with the police and blocked roads following his arrest. Muluzi was promptly flown to Blantyre, placed under house arrest at his home in Limbe, near Blantyre, and interrogated. His home was also searched by the police. Muluzi was questioned for about two hours and was shown documents which purportedly linked him to the alleged plot. Speaking on Joy Radio on May 27, Muluzi said that the documents were "laughable and fake" and accused the government of attempting to "intimidate and silence the opposition". His lawyers said on the same day that they would seek bail for Muluzi. According to one lawyer, the only people allowed into Muluzi's home by the police were four lawyers and a bodyguard, and he had been asked to name family members and lawyers who would be given permission to visit.

On May 29, Muluzi, who had still not been charged, appeared at the High Court in Blantyre for his bail application. On his arrival, he declared that the government was "useless". Fahad Assani, the head of Muluzi's legal team, described the arrest as "illegal and unconstitutional" and demanded his release from house arrest. According to Assani, because more than 48 hours had passed and Muluzi had not been charged, it was necessary for him to be released "without any conditions". Wezi Kayira, the director of public prosecutions, urged the court to reject the bail application, stressing that treason was "a very serious offence which carries a heavy penalty"; he said that investigations were continuing and expressed concern that they "would be jeopardised and evidence tampered with". Kayira also requested that the court impose "very strict conditions" if it chose to grant bail.

Judge Joseph Manyumgwa granted Muluzi bail on May 30, saying that in the absence of any charges against Muluzi he had to be released. According to Manyumgwa, Muluzi had the right to bail regardless of "the gravity of the alleged offence". Kayira said the investigation was ongoing and that charges would follow.

=== Allegations of intimidation and 2009 legal charges ===
Speaking to Capital Radio on 22 February 2009, Muluzi accused the government of using intimidation against his presidential candidacy and warned that such conduct could lead to "problems". A few days later, he was charged by the Anti-Corruption Bureau with stealing 12 million dollars of aid money; he appeared before a court in Blantyre and was released on bail. He appeared in court again on 12 March 2009 but failed to enter a plea on the 86 graft charges against him. Kalekeni Kaphale, a lawyer for Muluzi, asked for a delay, arguing that "this is the first time someone has been charged with such a volume of cases" in Malawi and that, since the defense had not seen the charges until early March, it needed "at least 14 days to study them to make proper responses".

On 10 July 2014, Muluzi was appointed Special Commonwealth Envoy to Swaziland, an appointment endorsed by the president of Malawi, Peter Mutharika.

== Personal life ==
Muluzi was Malawi's first Muslim president. He was married to Annie Chidzira Muluzi and then Patricia Shanil Muluzi while in office. After divorcing Annie Muluzi, he remarried Shanil Muluzi. His children include Austin Atupele Muluzi. He is father-in-law to Angela Zachepa.

Muluzi's firstborn daughter, Esme Atweni Muluzi, died after being struck by lightning on 12 December 2016.

Muluzi outlived his wives; Patricia Shanil Muluzi (known by then as Shanil Dzimbiri) died on 10 June 2024 in a plane crash, while Annie Chidzira Muluzi died in 2021 due to lung cancer.

Preceded by Hastings Kamuzu Banda	President of Malawi; 1994–2004	Succeeded by Bingu wa Mutharika
