= United Democratic Front (Malawi) =

Political party in Malawi

- Abbreviation: UDF
- President: Atupele Muluzi
- Secretary-General: Kandi Padambo
- Spokesperson: Ken Ndanga
- Founder: Bakili Muluzi
- Founded: October 1992
- Split from: Malawi Congress Party
- Youth wing: Yellow Youth
- Ideology: Liberalism
- Political position: Centre
- African affiliation: Africa Liberal Network
- Colours: Yellow; Blue
- Slogan: Delivering Change in Malawi
- National Assembly: 4 / 229
- SADC PF: 0 / 5
- Pan-African Parliament: 0 / 5

Election symbol
- Pair of holding hands

Website
- www.udfmalawi.org

The United Democratic Front is a political party in Malawi founded in 1992 by Bakili Muluzi. It claims to be a liberal party in Malawi and is mainly strong in the southern region populated by ethnic Yao. Bakili Muluzi was President of Malawi from 1994 to 2004.

== History ==
The United Democratic Front is a prominent political party in Malawi that was founded in 1992 by Bakili Muluzi. Until 2009, the party was a member of Liberal International, which it joined at the latter's Reykjavík Congress in 1994.

=== Rise of DPP faction ===
It came into power in 1994 under Bakili Muluzi; he was in power until 2004, serving two terms. It continued in power under Bingu wa Mutharika; however, Muluzi remained the head of the party. After succeeding Muluzi, Mutharika came into conflict with much of the party, including Muluzi, and he left the party in February 2005 to form the Democratic Progressive Party (DPP). The DPP which won the 2009 general election. This led to mass defections from the UDF to the ruling DPP. The party however, continued to restructure.

== Political performance ==
In 1994, the UDF candidate Bakili Muluzi came to power in Malawi. In the general election held on 20 May 2004, the UDF's candidate for president, Bingu wa Mutharika, won 35.9% of the vote and was elected. The party also won 49 out of 194 seats.

On 24 April 2008, a UDF convention, which included 2,000 delegates, chose Muluzi as the party's 2009 presidential candidate, despite questions about his eligibility due to term limits. He received 1,950 votes at the convention against 38 for Vice-President Cassim Chilumpha.

== UDF presidents ==
- Atupele Muluzi, 2012–2022
- Bakili Muluzi, 1993–2004

== Other notable UDF members ==
- Angela Muluzi
- Akefe Sukali Mviza
- Esther Jolobala
- Clement Chiwaya

== Election results ==
=== Presidential elections ===
Election	Party candidate	Votes	%	Position	Result
1994	Bakili Muluzi	1,404,754	47.15%	▲1st	Elected
1999	Bakili Muluzi	2,442,685	45.21%	1st	Elected
2004	Bingu wa Mutharika	1,195,586	35.97%	1st	Elected
2009	Bakili Muluzi	Candidate disqualified			N/A
2014	Atupele Muluzi	717,224	13.7%	▼4th	Defeated
2019	Atupele Muluzi	235,164	4.67%	4th	Defeated
2025	Atupele Muluzi	102,744	1.92%	4th	Defeated

=== National Assembly elections ===
Election	Party leader	Votes	%	Seats	+/–	Position
1994	Bakili Muluzi	1,375,878	46.53%	85 / 177	▲85	▲1st
1999	Bakili Muluzi	2,124,999	47.32%	93 / 193	▲8	1st
2004	Bakili Muluzi	801,200	25.34%	49 / 193	▼44	1st
2009	Bakili Muluzi	562,025	12.92%	17 / 193	▼32	▼3rd
2014	Atupele Muluzi	496,765	9.63%	14 / 193	▼3	▼4th
2019	Atupele Muluzi	227,335	4.58%	10 / 193	▼4	▲3rd
2025	Atupele Muluzi	TBA	TBA	4 / 229	▼6	▼4th

== See also ==
- Political parties in Malawi
- List of liberal parties
