= Women in the media in Malawi =

Women's participation in the media in Malawi has been the subject of academic study and monitoring by regional gender and media organisations. Women have worked in Malawian broadcasting since the establishment of the Malawi Broadcasting Corporation (MBC) in 1964, and they have organised professionally from the 1990s through bodies such as the Malawi Media Women's Association, but women remain underrepresented both as media employees and as sources quoted in news coverage.

== History ==
Women were employed in broadcasting from the founding of the state broadcaster MBC in 1964. Nyokase Madise, who joined that year, was the second woman employed by the corporation. Madise headed its women's desk and was the first producer and presenter of Women's World, a programme dealing with issues affecting women.

Following the transition to multiparty democracy in 1994, women journalists organised professionally. The Malawi Media Women's Association was formed in 1994 by the journalist Janet Karim, with Madise as vice-chairperson and Stella Mhura as secretary, in the run-up to the International Conference on Population and Development in Cairo and the Fourth World Conference on Women in Beijing; its first meeting drew more than fifteen women working for the Malawi News Agency, the MBC and the Daily Times.

In 1998 the association helped establish Dzimwe Community Radio at Mangochi with support from UNESCO and later USAID, a station intended to improve rural women's access to current affairs.

== Association for Women in Media ==
The Association for Women in Media (AWOME) has worked since 2019 to raise the profile of women in Malawian media and to campaign against sexual abuse in and beyond the newsroom, with the stated aim of an inclusive and gender-sensitive media. It elected a ten-member executive committee at Mponela, Dowa in October 2023. The Malawi Chapter of the Media Institute of Southern Africa (MISA) works closely with AWOME, including partnering on journalist training. Edyth Kambalame, an editor at Nation Publications,was interim president of the association in 2020.

In 2025, during the 16 Days of Activism Against Gender Based Violence, AWOME raised awareness about the digital violence directed at women journalists in Malawi, including cyberbullying, harassment, misinformation, cyber stalking and coordinated attacks on social media platforms, arguing that such abuse silences women and threatens media freedom. AWOME urged media institutions, technology companies, policymakers and the public to act in a coordinated way and hold perpetrators accountable. The Association's chairperson at that time was Dorothy Kachitsa.

== Representation in the industry ==
Gender Links has monitored gender in Southern African media since 2003 through a series of studies, including the Gender and Media Baseline Study, the Glass Ceilings research on media houses and the Gender and Media progress study, all of which cover Malawi among other SADC states. The 2009 Glass Ceilings study reported that 77% of media workers in Malawi were men; women made up 19% of top management, 26% of senior management, 27% of boards, and 28% of editorial staff, plus an 8-9% gender pay gap. The study sampled 10 media houses, 1132 employees, and data collected July-August 2008.

Regionally, the 2015 Gender and Media Progress Study found that women predominated among media studies students at 64% but made up only 40% of media employees.

== Representation in news content ==
Successive Gender Links studies have measured the proportion of women appearing in sources in Southern African news, rising from 17% in 2003 to 21% by 2020. The 2026 study found that women accounted for 29% of news sources across 200 outlets in all sixteen SADC member states, with no country in the region reaching parity. It also found that women appeared more often when speaking from personal experience - 38%, than as experts or commentators - 30%, or as spokespersons - 24%. For Malawi specifically, a Media Institute of Southern Africa study reported that women accounted for 20% of news sources in the country, up from 11% in 2003.

Academic work has examined how Malawian media portray women in public life. A 2026 systematic review of media coverage of women politicians in Southern Africa, covering Malawi among six countries, identified recurring gendered framings alongside emerging counter-framings.

== Women's and feminist media initiatives ==
Makewana's Daughters, an online forum for Malawian women's writing, was founded by the academic and writer, Timwa Lipenga.

The podcast Feministing While Malawian, created by Lusungu Kalanga and Umba Zalira, was named by The Guardian among the best podcasts in Africa in 2022.

== See also ==
- Malawi Media Women's Association
- Mass media in Malawi
- Malawi Broadcasting Corporation
- Women in Malawi
- Media Council of Malawi
- Janet Karim
- Edyth Kambalame
- Lusungu Kalanga
- Emily Mkamanga
- Walije Gondwe
- Timwa Lipenga
- Wona Collective
