= List of Malawian journalists =

This is a list of Malawian journalists, those born in Malawi and who have established citizenship or residency.

== B ==
- Mabvuto Banda
- Violet Banda
- David Blair (journalist)

== C ==
- Chikoko, Rex
- Martha Chikuni

== G ==
- Gregory Gondwe

== K ==
- Onesimo Makani Kabweza

== M ==
- Emily Mkamanga
- Agnes Mizere

== T ==
- Raphael Tenthani

== See also ==
- List of Malawians
- Outline of Malawi
