= List of newspapers in Malawi =

This article is a list of newspapers in Malawi.

== Overview ==
Under the dictatorship of Hastings Kamuzu Banda, which lasted from the country's founding in 1965 until 1994, there was no independent, free press in Malawi. Foreign correspondents were also banned. After the transition to multi-party democracy in 1994, much greater freedom was granted, triggering the birth of many newspapers. Most of these failed quickly due to high costs and the lack of skilled staff. Two main media organisations remain that still publish newspapers. The relative high cost of the newspapers means they remain the preserve of the wealthy. Most have a mix of English and Chichewa articles.

== List of news publications ==
Title	Headquarters	Language	Year established	Notes
African Evening Magazine (AFRIEM)			2013	Online only
Big Issue Malawi			2009	
Boma Lathu		Chewa	1973	Magazine
Nyasa Daily	Lilongwe	English and Chewa	2021	Online only
Daily Times	Blantyre	English	1895	Owned by Times Media Group; previously owned by BNL? (Hastings Banda's former business)
Fuko Nation		Chichewa, Chitumbuka		Bi-weekly
Malawi Government Gazette			1894	
Malawi Morning	Kasungu	English and Chewa	2018	Online only. Published by Kawelama Creations
Malawi News		English and Chewa	1895	Weekly. Owned by BNL
Malawi Voice	Limbe			Online only
malawi24			2014	Online only
Maravi Post	Atlanta, Georgia, USA	English Chichewa, Yao and Tumbuka	2009	Online only Published by Eltas Enterprises INC, an Internet Publishing and Software Company founded since @2005
Mirror	Blantyre	English and Nyanja	1994	Weekly
Moni Magazine	Limbe	English and Chewa	1964	Magazine
Nation	Blantyre	English and Chichewa	1993	Daily. Owned by Aleke Banda; its weekend edition is titled Weekend Nation
Nyasa Times	UK		2006	Online only. Published by B2B Initiatives.
Odini	Lilongwe	English and Chewa	1949	Catholic bi-weekly
This is Malawi	Blantyre	English and Chewa	1964	Magazine
Weekend Times			2009	Owned by BNL; dissolved in 2014.

== See also ==
- Media of Malawi
- List of radio stations in Africa: Malawi

== Bibliography ==
- Pascal J. Kishindo (2003). "Recurrent Themes in Chichewa Verse in Malawian Newspapers". Nordic Journal of African Studies. 12 (3). Helsinki: Nordic Association of African Studies. ISSN 1459-9465. Archived from the original on 2020-07-11.
- "Malawi: Directory: the Press". Africa South of the Sahara 2004. Regional Surveys of the World. Europa Publications. 2004. p. 672. ISBN 1857431839.
- "Malawi", Freedom of the Press, USA: Freedom House, 2015, OCLC 57509361, archived from the original on 2017-06-26
- "Newspapers Held in Microform: Malawi" (PDF). Cooperative Africana Materials Project. United States: Center for Research Libraries. 2012.
