= Mass media in Malawi =

Mass media in Malawi consist of several different types of communications media: television, radio, cinema, newspapers, magazines and Internet-based Web sites. Malawi also has a growing music industry. Media is either privately owned or government owned.

== Regulation ==
Broadcasting, telecommunications,postal services and internet provision are regulated by the Malawi Communications Regulatory Authority (MACRA), established in 1998 under the Communications Act. The Media Council of Malawi is the industry's self-regulatory body. It was first established in 1995, was dormant from 2010, and was relaunched on 31 December 2019. It maintains a Code of Ethics and Professional Conduct and accredits journalists, and its revival was supported by media managers as an alternative to statutory regulation by government.

== Radio ==
Malawian radio broadcasts in two bands: FM, AM. National Radio stations include MBC 1 and MBC2 that are run by Malawi Broadcasting Corporation. Privately owned radio station includes Zodiak Broadcasting Station, and Capital Radio Malawi. The Malawi Communications Regulatory Authority (MACRA) has recently issued licenses to new radio broadcasters to expand radio offerings in Malawi. This includes Matindi, GoodNews, and Mwadama.

== Television ==
Television in Malawi is regulated by MACRA.Though Malawi Television penetration is low. The country boasts 20 television stations by 2016 broadcasting on the countries digital network MDBNL, e.g. This includes Times Group, Timveni, Adventist, and Beta.

== Motion pictures ==
The motion picture industry in Malawi is in its infancy but there have been a few developments over the years that have given rise to film festival and individual films. There is a Malawi International Film festival that began in 2009. The most well known director has been Shemu Joyah is a producer and film maker from Malawi who produced Seasons of a life. Malawi's most well known actors include Michael Usi and Tapiwa Gwaza. Cinema can be viewed at indoor movie cinemas or at the drive-in movie cinema.

Since the 2020s a number of Malawian drama productions have been released directly on YouTube rather than through cinema or broadcast distribution. Among the most widely watched is Mushroom Shade, a drama series created by US based Malawian filmmaker Chawezi "Chaz" Munthali, which premiered in April 2024. In 2026 the series was adapted into a feature film, which premiered at the Bingu International Convention Centre in Lilongwe on 25 April.At the premiere the producers presented a posthumous Lifetime Legend Award to the Malawian playwright Du Chisiza Jr, received by members of his family; attendees included the president of the Film Association of Malawi, Dorothy Kingston.

== Newspapers ==
The Malawi News Agency (MANA) is the largest news network in Malawi. It was established in 1966 to provide and produce news content to the country from the government. It also gathers news from around the country. Its online news content launched in 2012.

The oldest privately owned newspaper in the nation is The Daily Times. The widest circulated national papers are The Daily Times and The Nation. Both are sold in most Malawian cities. Many of the newspapers have also branched out online and have online versions with credible content.

There has also been a growth of online newspapers. This includes privately funded papers owned by Malawians in the Diaspora such as Leeds, England based Nyasatimes, Atlanta, US based Maravi Post and Blantyre-based Malawi24.

== Magazines ==
Malawi has both English language and Chichewa magazines that circulate nationally, regionally or within a city.

== Digital media ==
=== Internet and social media use ===
At the start of 2025 there were 3.95 million internet users in Malawi. an online penetration rate of 18.0 percent, and 1.80 million social media user identities, equivalent to 8.2 percent of the population. Low penetration and the cost of mobile data have limited the reach of online media relative to radio, which remains the country's dominant medium.

There has been an increase in Malawians on social media, particularly on Twitter/X, Facebook, TikTok and WhatsApp groups which have become the main venues for political discussion online. Malawi's blogsphere has stagnated as social media has become the most important tool for transparency in Malawi. It has been linked to influencing the outcome of the constitutional crisis in 2012.

=== Facebook based news outlets ===
Facebook has become a principal channel for news distribution in Malawi. According to Freedom House,the dominant local producers of original online content are established media organisations that have also built online platforms, rather than digital-native outlets. Online news outlets have been subjected to government pressure through unofficial directives, and journalists and other internet users have been prosecuted for online expression.

=== Podcasting ===
Podcasting emerged in Malawi in the 2020s, largely among urban young people, covering popular culture, entertainment and social issues. Practitioners interviewed by the Nation in 2025 described the medium as growing and expected it to become more structured as internet access and digital literacy expand, though they identified advertising and sponsorship as undeveloped. Feministing while Malawian, a podcast created by Lusungu Kalanga and Umba Zalira, was named by the Guardian among the best podcasts in Africa in 2022.

=== TikTok and the creator economy ===
TikTok is among the platforms used by Malawians however Malawian creators have not had access to monetisation programmes that global platforms operate in larger markets, and have argued that they generate engagement without financial return. In 2026 MACRA began a monetisation initiative for Malawian content creators through engagements with Meta and TikTok held in Lilongwe, presenting it as a route to youth employment and digital entrepreneurship. The move followed the 2026-27 national budget which set out plans for fiscal frameworks covering the digital economy.

== See also ==
- Communications in Malawi
- List of Malawian writers
- Women in the media in Malawi
- Malawi Media Women's Association
- Media Council of Malawi

== Bibliography ==
- Steve S. Mwiyeriwa (1978). "Printing Presses and Publishing in Malawi". Society of Malawi Journal. 31. JSTOR 29778404.
- Harri Englund (2011). Human Rights and African Airwaves: Mediating Equality on the Chichewa Radio. Bloomington: Indiana University Press. ISBN 9780253223470.
- "Malawi: Directory: Broadcasting and Communications". Africa South of the Sahara 2004. Regional Surveys of the World. Europa Publications. 2004. p. 673. ISBN 1857431839.
- "Malawi", Freedom of the Press, USA: Freedom House, 2015, OCLC 57509361, archived from the original on 2017-06-26
