= Malawi–United Kingdom relations =

- Malawi: United Kingdom

The diplomatic, economic, and cultural relations between the republic of malawi and the united kingdom are characterized by long standing, stable partnership rooted in history and built on mutual cooperation. They both are part of Commonwealth of nations and United Nations.

== History ==
British influence in modern-day Malawi began through a system of foreign influence when Nyasaland became a British protectorate under a colonial administration. The Queen of Great Britain became the Queen of Nyasaland. Nyasaland gained independence on 6 July 1964 and has since known as Malawi.

== Post colonial relations ==
Malawi has had diplomatic relations with United Kingdom during the post-colonial era.

=== Cochrane-Dyet cable ===
Malawi and the UK found themselves in a diplomatic row in 2012 that resulted in the mutual expulsion of their envoys. Bingu wa Mutharika expelled British High Commissioner Fergus Cochrane-Dyet for calling him "arrogant" and "intolerant" after a leaked cable was published in The Nation newspaper. The United Kingdom in return expelled acting High Commissioner Flossie Gomile-Chidyaonga and revoked her invitation to the royal wedding of the Duke and Duchess of Cambridge. Relations were restored after Joyce Banda came into power.

== See also ==
- List of high commissioners of Malawi to the United Kingdom
- List of high commissioners of the United Kingdom to Malawi
