= Nyokase Madise =

- Born: Nyokase Florence Chibambo; April 30, 1939; Ekwendeni
- Died: February 26, 2024 (aged 84)
- Burial place: Mkhulu Village, Mzimba District
- Occupations: Radio Broadcaster, producer, journalist
- Years active: 1964-1994
- Employer: Malawi Broadcasting Corporation
- Children: Nyovani Madise, Khungekile Matiya, Sunduzwayo Madise, Dingiswayo Madise, Mwizayekha Madise

Nyokase Florence Madise (30 April 1939 – 26 February 2024) was a Malawian radio broadcaster, producer and journalist. Madise worked for the Malawi Broadcasting Corporation (MBC) from 1964 until 1994 and was only the second woman employed by the state broadcaster. She headed MBC's women's desk and was the first producer and presenter of the programme Women's World.

== Early life ==
Nyokase Florence Chibambo was born on 30 April 1939 in Ekwendeni, Mzimba District, in the area of Traditional Authority Mtwalo. She married George Phangazindabo Madise in 1960, and worked as a teacher before entering broadcasting; in an interview, she said she had been recruited into broadcasting by Aleke Banda, who was then a cabinet minister in the government of Hastings Kamuzu Banda.

== Career ==
Madise joined the Malawi Broadcasting Corporation in 1964, the year of Malawian independence, working as a presenter, reporter and producer. Shortly after being hired, she became the first woman in Africa to be sent to the United Kingdom for training with the BBC. Madise headed MBC's women's desk and was the first producer and presenter of Women's World, a development programme dealing with issues facing women in Malawi and elsewhere. She also produced and presented Theatre of the Air, Song Book Days and Writer's Corner, among other programmes; she also worked as a studio and outside broadcast producer, including live coverage of President Banda and state banquets. She rose to assistant controller before leaving the corporation in 1994 after thirty years. The Malawian writer and former minister Ken Lipenga remembered being taught tape editing during vocational placements at MBC in the 1970s when Madise was departmental head.

== Malawi Media Women's Association ==
In 1994 Madise became the founding vice-chairperson of the Malawi Media Women's Association (MAMWA), formed by journalist Janet Karim in the run-up to the International Conference on Population and Development in Cairo and the Fourth World Conference on Women in Beijing. Karim served as chairperson, and Stella Mhura as secretary. The organisation's first meeting, held at the offices of the Malawi News Agency, was attended by more than fifteen women working for the news agency MBC and the Daily Times.

== Later life and death ==
After retiring from MBC, Madise produced and presented radio programmes on a voluntary basis for a religious station, Trans World Radio. Madise had seven children, including Supreme Court Judge Dingiswayo Madise, human rights lawyer and lecturer Sunduzwayo Madise, academic Nyovani Madise and Khungekile Matiya, a former president of the Netball Association of Malawi. She died on the night of Monday 26 February 2024 in Mzuzu, where she had been living. After collapsing at home, she was pronounced dead on arrival at the hospital. She was 84. She lay in state at her residence in Mzuzu and was buried on 29 February 2024 in Mzimba District, in the area of Traditional Authority Mtwalo. Her death was described as a loss for the nation's creative industry.
