= Theresa Kachindamoto =

Malawian chief and activist (1958–2025)

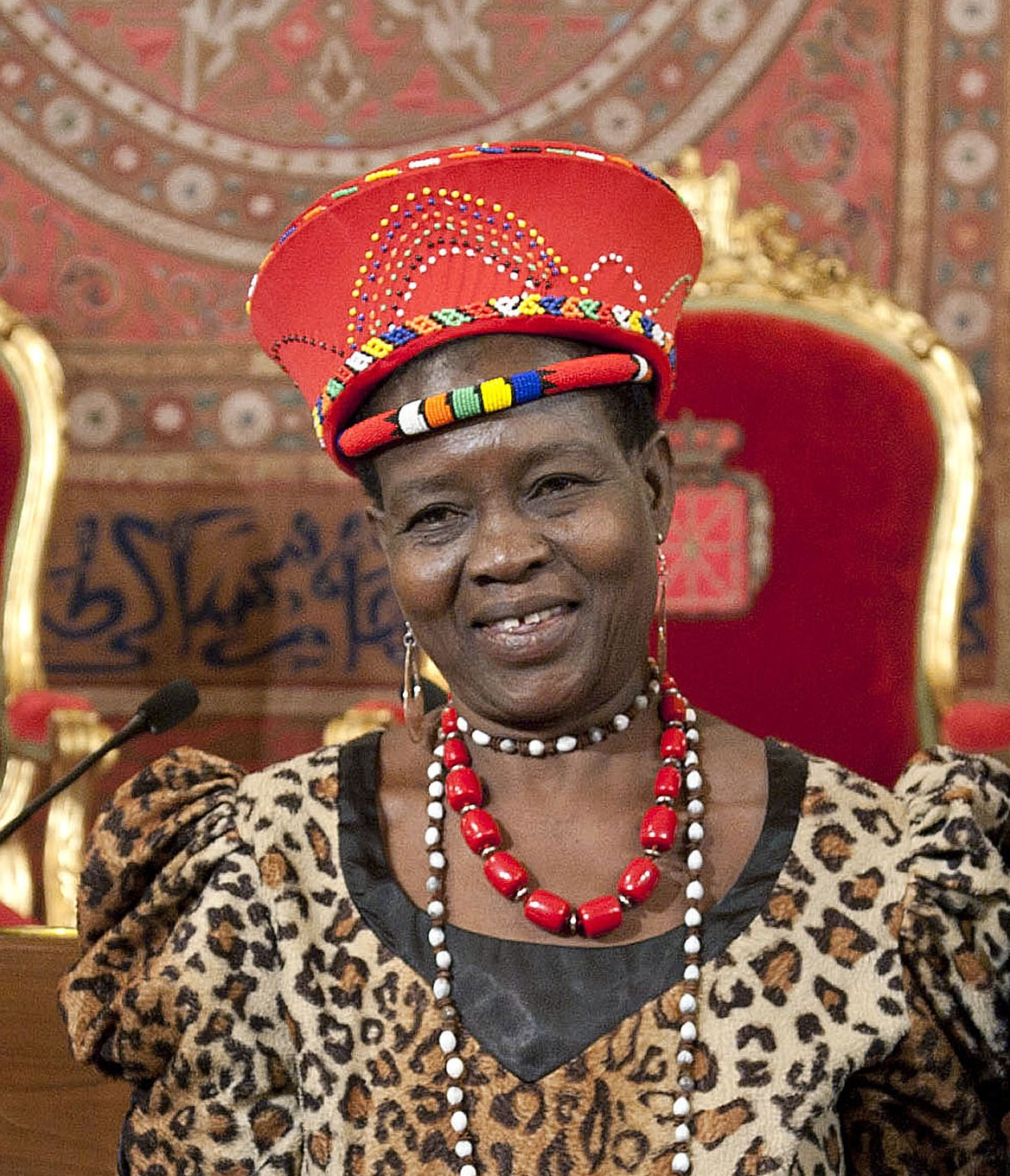
- Kachindamoto in 2018

Inkosi of Dedza
- In office 2003–2025
- Preceded by: Kachindamoto VI Justino (1988–2001)

Personal details
- Born: 23 November 1958 Dedza District, Federation of Rhodesia and Nyasaland (present-day Malawi)
- Died: 13 August 2025 (aged 66) Lilongwe, Malawi

Theresa Kachindamoto (23 November 1958 – 13 August 2025) was a Malawian paramount chief and activist. Primarily active in the Dedza District in central Malawi, she had informal authority over more than 900,000 people. She was known for her forceful action in dissolving child marriages and advocacy on education for both girls and boys. Over 3,500 marriages were annulled.

== Background ==
Theresa Kachindamoto was the youngest of twelve siblings in a family of traditional rulers in the Dedza District around Lake Malawi. She worked as a secretary for 27 years at a College in Zomba District in southern Malawi. She married and became the mother of five boys. In 2003, the chiefs of Dedza district chose her as the next senior chief of the district, with over 900,000 people, after her elder brother died. She said she had been chosen because she was "good with people" and was now senior chief whether she liked it or not. She accepted the position and returned to Monkey Bay, where she assumed the traditional red robes, beads and leopardskin headband. Theresa became the Inkosi of the Chidyaonga line of the Maseko or Gomani dynasty as Kachindamoto VII in succession to Justino Kachindamoto VI, who had held the title from 1988 to 2001 after the regency of Sunduzeni from 2001 to 2003.

== Child marriage prevention ==
Malawi is one of the poorest countries in the world, and has an HIV infection rate of 10% of the population. A United Nations survey in 2012 found that more than half of the girls in Malawi were married before they reached 18, and ranked Malawi as having one of the highest rates of child marriages in the world, with particularly high rates in rural areas. Young girls, sometimes as young as seven, are subject to sexually abusive traditions that include sexual initiation camps for kusasa fumbi (cleansing). In 2015, Malawi passed a law that forbade marriage before the age of 18. However, the constitution and the customary law administered by the traditional authorities still say that children can marry if the parents agree.

Kachindamoto was disturbed when she found high rates of child marriage in her district. She could not persuade parents to change their views, but had the 50 sub-chiefs in the district agree to abolish early marriage and annul existing unions. She fired four sub-chiefs responsible for areas where child marriages continued, later reinstating them when she had confirmation that these marriages had been annulled. She convinced community leaders to change the civil code to ban early marriage. As of 2019, she had managed to have over 3,500 early marriages annulled. Her actions have brought her international recognition.

In June 2015, she told Maravi Post, "I have terminated 330 marriages, yes, of which 175 were girl-wives and 155 were boy-fathers. I wanted them to go back to school and that has worked." She told Nyasa Times, "I don't want youthful marriages, they must go to school. We have now set our own laws to govern everybody within my area when it comes to marriages and will leave no sacred cow. ... No child should be found loitering at home; gardening or doing any house hold chores during school time. No village head, GVH (Note: GVH: group village headman. A chief or traditional authority in Malawi.) or church clergy to officiate marriage before scrutinizing the birth dates of the couple."

The marriages that were annulled were customary ones, regulated by chiefs, rather than civil marriages. Chief Kachindamoto worked with groups of mothers, teachers, village development committees, religious leaders and non-government organizations. She met resistance from parents and the couples themselves, particularly poor parents when a dowry had been paid. She felt that the door-to-door campaign was the largest factor in gaining agreement for annulment of the unions. UN Women and UNICEF plan to work with traditional leaders elsewhere to replicate the best practices of Chief Kachindamoto in reducing child marriages. Kachindamoto said, "Educate a girl and you educate the whole area ... You educate the world". (Note: The proverb "If you educate a man you educate an individual, but if you educate a woman you educate a family (nation)" may come from the Fante people of Ghana. The Ghanaian scholar James Emman Kwegyir Aggrey (1875–1927) used it to convince parents to send their girl children to school.)

== Death and legacy ==
On 13 August 2025, she died in Kamuzu Central Hospital in Lilongwe.

Her biography, Super Chief: The story of Chief Theresa Kachindamoto, was written for children by Lindsay Kachika Jere and illustrated by Kate Mkandawire.

== Awards ==
- On 8 March 2017, Theresa Kachindamoto was honored with the Leadership in Public Life Award at the 16th Annual Vital Voices Global Partnership Award Ceremony in Washington, D.C., USA.
- In March 2024, she was awarded a joint honorary doctorate from KU Leuven and UCLouvain.
- On 10 October 2024, she was awarded the African Genius Award 2024.

== Sources ==
- Cahoon, Ben, "Malawi Traditional polities", World Statesmen.org
- John Kwami Esseboe Nyamidie (1999), "September, 1999", African Proverb of the Month
- Malawi News Agency (23 June 2015), "Malawi chief Kachindamoto terminates 330 teenage marriage, enrols them back in school", Nyasa Times, archived from the original on 6 April 2016
- McNeish, Hannah (31 March 2016), "Malawi's fearsome chief, terminator of child marriages", Al Jazeera
- Odziwa, James (3 April 2016), "Chief Kachindamoto has become an international hero because of her strong stance against child marriages", Maravi Post
- UNICEF Malawi (August 2015), Chief Kachindamoto annulled 330 teenage marriages, archived from the original on 20 August 2018
