= Daud Suleman =

Malawian technologist and public servant

Daud Elvin Suleman

Director General of the Malawi Communications Regulatory Authority
- In office 13 October 2021 – 4 February 2026
- President: Lazarus Chakwera
- Preceded by: Godfrey Itaye
- Succeeded by: Mayamiko Nkoloma

Personal details
- Born: December 3, 1979 (age 46)
- Citizenship: Malawian
- Party: Malawi Congress Party
- Occupation: ICT Professional
- Known for: Digital transformation and ICT policy reforms in Malawi

Daud Elvin Suleman is a Malawian information and communications technology professional who serves as the Director General of the Malawi Communications Regulatory Authority. He is known for his leadership in advancing digital transformation, telecommunications regulation, and internet governance in Malawi In October 2025, He was suspended from his position pending investigations by the Government of Malawi.

== Early life ==
Before his career in technology and public service, Suleman was an accomplished basketball player. He represented the Malawi national basketball team in the 2007 FIBA Africa Championship for men, participating in three games and contributing an average of 1.3 points, 3 rebounds, and 1 assist per game. He has also been honored and recognized for his contributions to the sport.

== Career ==
Suleman was appointed as Director General of MACRA in October 2021 following a competitive recruitment process conducted by the Government of Malawi. Before his appointment, he worked in the technology and financial sectors, gaining experience in ICT policy, fintech, and systems innovation.

As MACRA head, Suleman oversaw a number of initiatives aimed at enhancing digital literacy, expanding internet access, and modernizing Malawi's telecommunications sector. Under his leadership, MACRA issued a directive to phase out physical airtime and data scratch cards, transitioning mobile operators to electronic top-up systems.

He has been an outspoken advocate for digital rights and online safety, acknowledging that Malawi's legal framework for ICTs remains outdated and needs reform. He has also called for collaboration between regulators, schools, and civil-society organizations to ensure that children and young users have safer experiences online.

In 2024, Suleman was appointed to the International Telecommunication Union Digital Innovation Board, where he represents Malawi in global ICT innovation and policy discussions. His work has also been profiled by the GSMA and the International Institute of Communications (IIC), which describe him as a leading regional voice on digital transformation.

Additionally, he has promoted the implementation of revenue assurance systems within MACRA to improve transparency and efficiency in the collection of telecommunications levies.

In October 2025, Suleman was suspended from his position as Director General of MACRA pending investigations by the Government of Malawi. The suspension formed part of a broader government action that also affected senior executives at other parastatals, including the Malawi Broadcasting Corporation and the National Economic Empowerment Fund. The Office of the President and Cabinet, through Chief Secretary Justin Saidi, confirmed the suspensions, citing “ongoing investigations”. However, legal commentators described the move as potentially irregular, noting that most parastatal boards had been dissolved at the time and therefore might lack authority to execute such administrative actions.

On 4 February 2026, the MACRA Board terminated Suleman’s contract as Director General following investigations into alleged financial and administrative misconduct.

== Controversies ==
During his tenure at MACRA, Suleman faced multiple allegations including a conflict of interest over transmitter installation tied to his private media interests, procurement irregularities involving his official vehicle, and internal staff grievances alleging targeted management actions in response to anonymous disclosures.

In September 2025, Suleman faced criticism during the 2025 general election period when MACRA, under his leadership, allegedly instructed major media houses to halt the live broadcasting of unofficial election results dashboards that were tracking tallies from polling stations, at a time when then opposition candidate Peter Mutharika was reportedly leading incumbent President Lazarus Chakwera.
