= Communications in Malawi =

Communications in Malawi includes the country's postal, telephone, television, radio and internet services.

== Post ==
Malawi Posts Corporation provides the national postal service in Malawi and runs the post offices throughout the country. Ten other postal services providers operate in Malawi, including DHL, FedEx.

Postal services in Malawi are regulated by the Malawi Communications Regulatory Authority (MACRA).

== Telephone ==
Mobile telephones are vastly more common than fixed line phones in Malawi, with over 6.1 million mobile subscriptions compared with only 45,678 fixed line subscriptions As of 2015.

A report by the International Telecommunication Union in 2014 found the average Malawians spend on mobile phones was over 56% of the average monthly earning there. This was the highest proportion of earnings found by the survey.

Telephone system:

- domestic - fair system of open-wire lines, microwave radio relay links, and radiotelephone communications stations
- international - satellite earth stations - 2 Intelsat (1 Indian Ocean and 1 Atlantic Ocean)

== Radio and television ==
Radio and television broadcast services in Malawi are also regulated by the Malawi Communications Regulatory Authority (MACRA).

There are 45 licensed radio broadcast stations, of which 31 are operational: AM 9, FM 5 (plus 15 repeater stations), shortwave 2 (plus a third station held in standby status)) (As of 2016)

Radios: 2.6 million (As of 1997)

There are 20 licensed television broadcast stations, of which 5 are operational (As of 2016).

== Internet ==
The internet in Malawi is regulated by the Malawi Communications Regulatory Authority (MACRA) Business to consumer Internet service providers include Airtel, and Malawi Postal Service.

As of July 2015 there were 1.67 million internet users in Malawi.

The number of Internet service providers (ISPs) was 18 (As of 2003). The Country code (Top level domain) is MW.

== See also ==
- Malawi
- Media of Malawi
