= Raphael Tenthani =

Malawian freelance journalist

- Born: 1 October 1971; Malawi
- Died: 16 May 2015 (aged 43); Kammwamba, Zalewa, Neno District, Malawi
- Occupation: journalist
- Notable credit(s): BBC, The Daily Times (Malawi)
- Title: Correspondent, columnist

Raphael "Ralph" Tenthani (1 October 1971 – 16 May 2015) was a freelance journalist from Malawi. Tenthani was a BBC correspondent and a columnist for Malawi's Daily Times. He was a respected journalist in Malawi well known for his popular column, "The Muckraking". He was well known for providing political analysis on topical issues. He had been the subject of controversy for his candid reporting on political issues. He was very critical of the crackdown on journalism during the Bingu wa Mutharika administration. He was also a columnist for Associated Press, Pan African News Agency, and the Maravi Post.

== "Muckraking on Sunday"Column ==
Tenthani was a columnist for Malawi's nationally circulated newspaper, Sunday Times. He wrote a popular regular column called "Muckrakings".

In 2010, he was attacked by the ruling DPP party spokesperson for writing a 'Muckracking column that was sympathetic to ostracized vice-president Joyce Banda, who was facing political isolation from President Bingu wa Mutharika. When Tenthani was in the hospital after a car accident in 2011, he received a visit from then vice-president Joyce Banda at the hospital. He has again been by Malawi's flagship online news Nyasa Times as its 'person of the year' for 2014.

== Mutharika Administration Attacks ==
=== Haunted House Arrest ===
In 2005, he reported in a news article that the President had moved out of the presidential palace due to a fear of ghosts. In his article, he sourced the president's religious affairs adviser, the Rev. Malani Mtonga, who had reported that President Bingu wa Mutharika had left the presidential palace because he was hearing "strange noises" and "felt a strange presence hanging around him" at night. Rev. Mtonga denied making that statement to the press but another independent journalist, Mabvuto Banda reported the same story in The Nation. Mr. Tenthani and Mabvuto Banda were both arrested. Both were arrested at their homes in Blantyre and detained at police headquarters in Lilongwe. He was going to be charged with "publishing false information that is likely to cause [a] breach of peace". He was released on bail shortly after.

=== Criticism of Press freedom Crackdown ===
During the Bingu wa Mutharika administration, he became to target of attacks from the government due to his criticism of Mutharika and freedom of the press. Tenthani's house was ransacked by an unknown assailant in 2011, following the Malawi protests against the Mutharika administration.

At the height of Mutharika's crackdown on the press, he was indirectly named in a press release to the nation for being critical dated March 9, 2012, that aimed at suppressing the press. The press release referred to journalists in the country that referred to Mutharika as "Big Kahuna", a pejorative nickname that made reference to the President's increasingly dictatorial turn. Tenthani denied that this was being used to refer to Mutharika pejoratively.

Tenthani died in a car crash in 2015.

== Awards ==
- Best Columnist, MISA Malawi Awards - 2012, for Daily Times
- UN Media Award 2010, for Associated Press Millennium Development Goals (MDG) correspondence
- Nyasatimes human Rights and Democracy Award, 2010
