= Edyth Kambalame =

Malawian journalist and newspaper editor

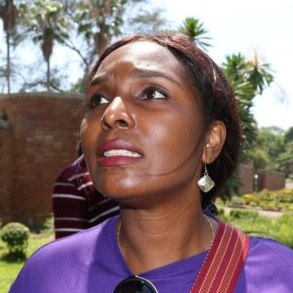
- in 2020
- Born: c. 1986
- Education: University of Malawi
- Occupation: newspaper editor
- Employer: The Nation newspaper

Edyth Kambalame (born c. 1986) is a Malawian journalist. She has held senior editorial roles at Nation Publications, publisher of The Nation newspaper, including deputy editor by 2020, editor of the "Nation on Sunday by 2021", and bureau chief by 2024. She has leadership roles at the Malawi Media Women's Association and the Malawi Editors Forum. She won the WAN-IFRA Women in News Editorial Leadership Award for Southern Africa.

== Early life and education ==
Kambalame was born in about 1986. She was part of the first year intake for a new journalism course at the University of Malawi. In her second year she spent a few weeks at The Nation newspaper and she was chosen to be an intern there in her third year. She graduated with a Bachelor of Arts degree. Kambalame gained a Chevening scholarship in 2016 to study for a master's degree in gender and media in the following year at the University of Sussex.

== Career ==
Kambalame had worked at Capital Radio Malawi, but her first job was as a general journalist for The Nation. She later took an interest in women's lives and gender related issues. She argues that women journalists need to be advocates as modern journalism requires it. She became the UNFPA Reproductive Health Champion Award (for Print Media) in 2012.

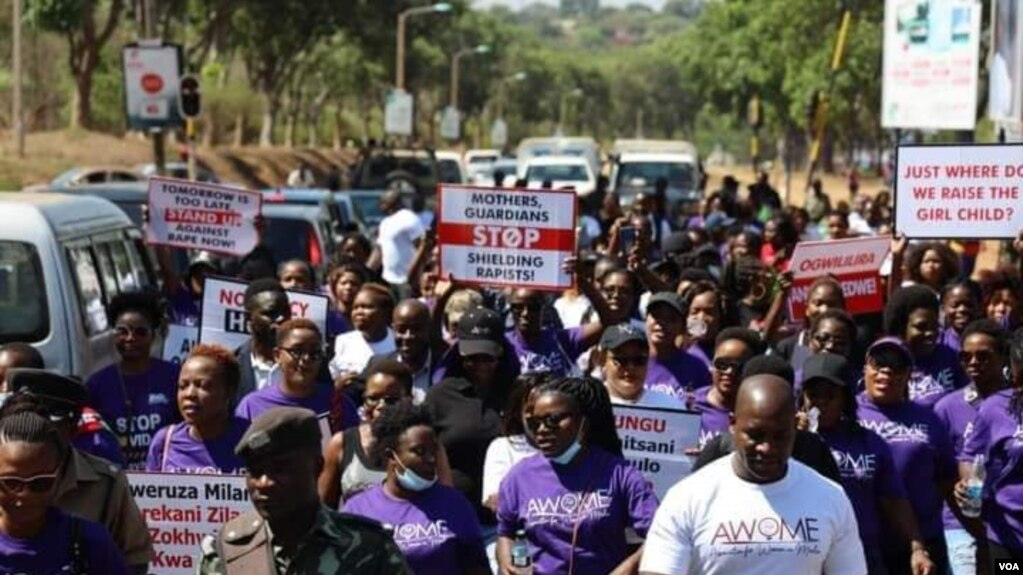
A 2020 protest in Blantyre against the sexual abuse of women

Kambalame is active in several bodies through which Malawian women media practitioners have organised professionally. have. In 2020 she was the interim President of the Malawi Media Women's Association and the Deputy Editor of The Nation newspaper. In 2020 Kambalame was also the chairperson of the Association of Women in Media (AWOME), which organised a protest attended by hundreds of people, in Blantyre, against rape and sexual abuse. It was one of three protests in cities in Malawi. The maximum penalty for rape in Malawi was fourteen years but Kambalame called for the penalty to be life imprisonment.

She was the Vice President of Malawi Editors' Forum in 2021 when she was awarded the WAN-IFRA Women in News Editorial Leadership Award for Southern Africa. At the time of the 2021 award, she was editor of "Nation on Sunday",vice-president of the Malawi Editors Forum, and vice chairperson of the board of the Media Council of Malawi, with more than fifteen years in the industry.

Kambalame writes a regular column for The Nation in which she addresses women's political representation, gender-based violence, education funding and the economics of the news industry. Writing in December 2024 ahead of the 2025 general election, she argued that women held about 21 percent of the seats in the Malawi Parliament and that the position would not improve without deliberate action by political parties.

== See also ==
- Women in the media in Malawi
- Media of Malawi
- Malawi Media Women's Association
