= Justin Sadack Saidi =

Malawian politician

Justin Sadack K. Saidi

Chief Secretary to the Government of Malawi
- Incumbent
- Assumed office 5 October 2025
- President: Peter Mutharika
- Preceded by: Colleen Zamba

Personal details
- Party: Democratic Progressive Party
- Occupation: Civil servant, politician

Justin Sadack K. Saidi is a Malawian civil servant who has been serving as the Chief Secretary to the Government of Malawi since October 2025, following his appointment by President Peter Mutharika. Before this role, he held several senior positions in the Ministry of Education, Science and Technology and he is an experienced technocrat in public administration.

== Public service career ==
Saidi has served in the Ministry of Education, Science and Technology (MoEST) as Principal Secretary. While in that role, he oversaw efforts to improve the inspection and advisory directorate by appointing additional school inspectors. He also participated in the Malawi Education Sector Improvement Programme (MESIP), and took part in international exchanges (e.g. a learning deputation to Zambia) to help improve quality and equity in the education sector.

In February 2021, he resigned from his position as Principal Secretary.

In October 2025, Saidi was appointed Chief Secretary to the Government by President Peter Mutharika. This was part of a broader set of senior and cabinet-level appointments following the 2025 general elections. Few weeks after his appointment, Saidi confirmed the suspension of three senior parastatal executives pending government investigations. The suspended officials included Daud Suleman, Director General of the Malawi Communications Regulatory Authority.

== Public reputation ==
Saidi has been described in media sources as a technocrat - someone with professional civil service experience rather than strictly political background.
