= Malawi Posts Corporation =

- Industry: Postal services, financial services
- Founded: June 2000; 26 years ago
- Headquarters: Blantyre, Malawi
- Area served: Malawi
- Services: Letter post, parcel service, financial services
- Website: malawiposts.com

Malawi Posts Corporation (MPC) is the statutory corporation responsible for the postal service and some financial services in Malawi.

== Services ==
MPC runs 180 post offices throughout Malawi, and also provides services via 154 postal agencies. Mail delivery times vary from next-day delivery within the cities to 5 days between rural post offices. The post offices may also provide PO boxes and sell stationery.

Financial services provided include electronic, telegraphic and money transfer services within Malawi and internationally, and utility and telephone bill payments.

The MPC is regulated by the Malawi Communications Regulatory Authority (MACRA) which regulates all postal services in Malawi. Since MPC's creation MACRA has licensed ten other postal services providers such as DHL and FedEx.

== History ==
The corporation was created from the Malawi Posts and Telecommunications Corporation which was restructured in June 2000 in accordance with the 1998 Communications Act.

== See also ==
- Communications in Malawi
