= Madise =

Madise may refer to:

- Madise (surname)
- Madise, Harju County, village in Lääne-Harju Parish, Estonia
- Madise, Tartu County, village in Kambja Parish, Estonia
- Madise, Võru County, village in Antsla Parish, Estonia
- Järva-Madise, village in Järva Parish, Estonia

== See also ==
- Madiseh
