= Malawi Media Women's Association =

Malawi Media Women's orgn - founded c.1990s by Janet Karim et al

The Malawi Media Women's Association (MAMWA) was founded by Janet Karim. The organisation organised its own radio station, improving the access of rural women in Malawi to current affairs. Edyth Kambalame was the interim President of the Association for Women in Media (Awome) in 2020.

== History ==
The association was created by Janet Karim. She was a Chancellor College graduate who had started Malawi's first magazine for women and the Independent newspaper. She was encouraged by Esnath Kaliyati who was the first female Principal Secretary in the Government of Malawi. Karim formed the group with herself as chair, veteran broadcaster Nyokase Madise as vice-chair and Stella Mhura as secretary. The first meeting attracted fifteen other women journalists who all wanted to become members.

In 2000 Stella Mhura was the chair and she campaigned against the discrimination shown to women journalists in Malawi. They organised demonstrations in the main cities of Blantyre, Lilongwe and Mzuzu. Women are very poorly represented in Southern African media and in Malawi in particular. Three quarters of people in media are male and the proportion in management is even less.

MAMWA helped establish the Dzimwe Community Radio station in 1998 in Mangochi, with assistance from UNESCO and later USAID. MAMWA is credited with improving the access to radio for women living in rural Malawi. The radio is their best source of news and in some cases groups meet to discuss the resulting issues. In 2002 Karim announced USAID money given to fund four clubs for rural listeners.

== Leadership ==
Edyth Kambalame who was the Deputy Editor of The Nation newspaper was the interim President of the Association for Women in Media (Awome) in 2020. In 2025 the chair was Dorothy Kachitsa.

== See also ==
- Women in Malawi
- Women in the media in Malawi
- Mass media in Malawi
- Media Council of Malawi
