= National Library Service of Malawi =

National library of Malawi

National Library Service, Malawi
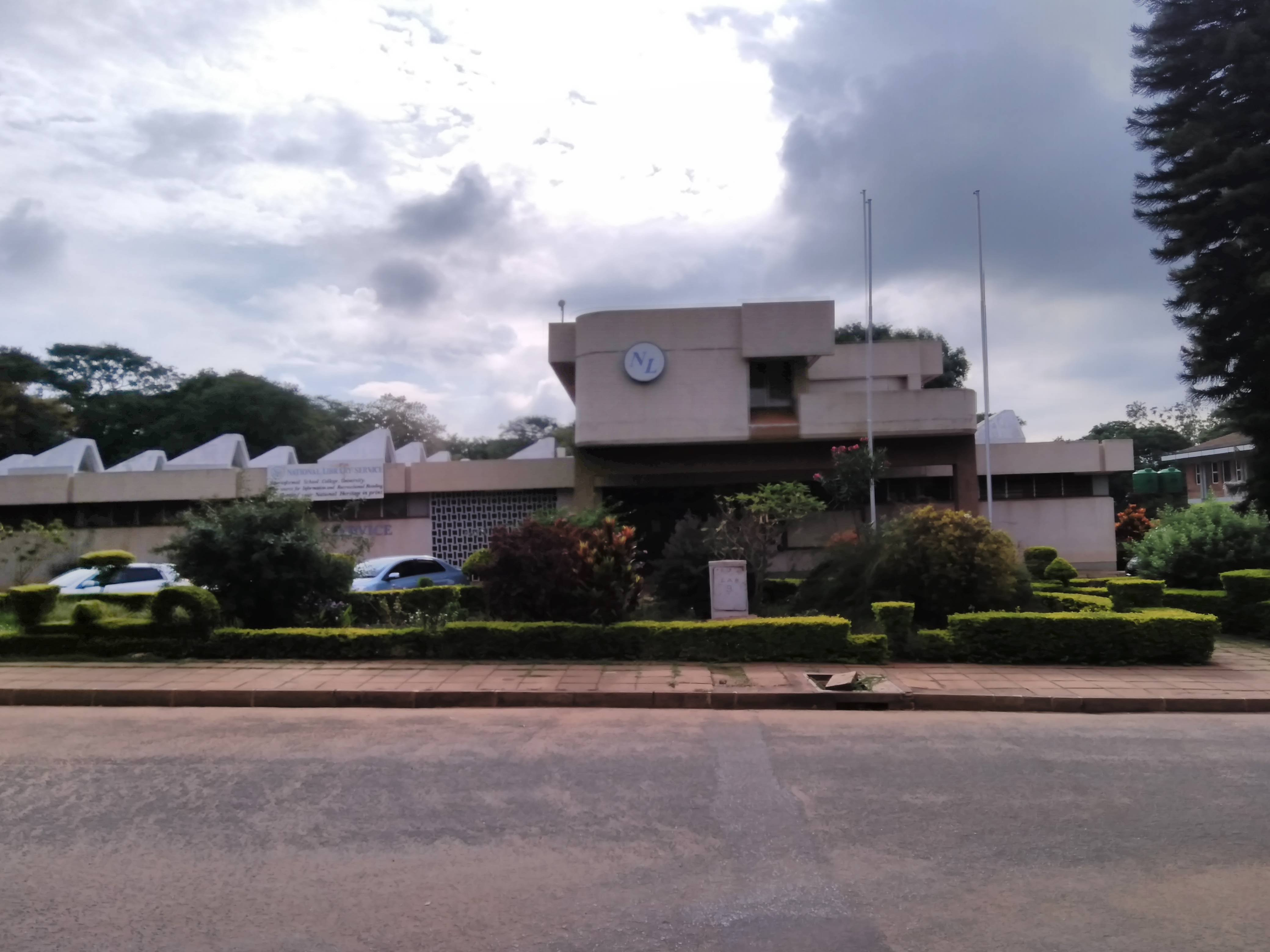
- National Library in Lilongwe, 2018.

Agency overview
- Formed: 1967
- Headquarters: Lilongwe, Malawi; 15.784687594941422°S 35.00851210709746°E
- Website: www.nls.mw

The National Library Service of Malawi is the legal deposit and copyright library for Malawi. The National Library Service of Malawi is run by the Malawi National Library Service Board. The Malawi National Library Service Board is a Statutory Corporation established under the Act of Parliament, No. 31 of 1967. The main task of the Service is to operate nationally distributed public library and information services in Malawi. Their declared mission is to ensure that Malawians have access to educational training, access to materials for leisure and access to materials that can provide information for national development. Specifically they promote, establish, equip, manage, maintain and develop the fifteen libraries in Malawi.

== Libraries in Malawi ==
The National Library Service is governed by a board whose members include Gift Kadzamira. The service is funded by the Malawi government, although many of their books are sourced through the UK charity Book Aid International. The National Library Service places orders for the books they require, and new books are dispatched to Malawi. By providing new and required books, the arrangement enables the government to cover the costs of staff and library management.

There are fifteen libraries in Malawi being managed by the National Library Service. On average (in 2014), each library provides access to 146,000 individuals each year or around 400 people a day. In the capital Lilongwe, four libraries were built in partnership with the Building Malawi organisation

== Programmes ==
Malawi Folktales Project

Malawi Folktales Project documents folktales that are gathered for education purposes. The aim is to safeguard Malawian heritage before it disappears. Sony Corporation, at the request of Malawi National Commission for UNESCO and the Global Future Charitable Trust (GFCT), provides audio-visual recording equipment and technical training for locals, via the National Library Service, to collect, edit, and digitize (document) the valuable and rich traditional culture of Malawians.

Malawi Library and Information Consortium (MALICO)

Malawi Library and Information Consortium (MALICO) was established on 7 May 2003 and registered as a Trust on 8 March 2004. MALICO's main objectives are to encourage cooperation among information stakeholders, influence information policy at the national level, work for adequate ICT infrastructure for members, especially sufficient internet bandwidth; to assist in the development of appropriate ICT skills at all levels and facilitate access to electronic journal articles in international databases. The consortium also organises and digitises Malawian content. It has also assembled and preserved indigenous information and provided access to that information in many formats for all Malawians.

== See also ==
- National Archives of Malawi

== Bibliography ==
- G.P. Rye (1976). "National Library Service: A Paper read to the Society of Malawi". Society of Malawi Journal. 29. JSTOR 29778355.
