= John Lwanda =

Malawian medical doctor

John Lloyd Chipembere Lwanda (born 1949) is a Malawian medical doctor, writer, poet, researcher, publisher, and music producer. He is a published author and also a publisher of books and music. He was an honorary senior lecturer at the University of Glasgow Department of Primary Care until 2005. Lwanda did his history and social science PhD at the University of Edinburgh's Centre of African Studies.

== Education ==
Lwanda was educated in Zimbabwe (1956–1958), Malawi (1958–1969) and Scotland at Anglican, Catholic, and Presbyterian schools and colleges. He spent a politically and musically influential elective year in the US in 1974. Though he had intended to pursue the arts, his father advised him to take up medicine. Graduating in medicine in 1976, he specialised in paediatrics before turning to adult general medicine.

== Career ==
He has worked as a census enumerator for the Malawi National Census 1966 and as a clerk in the Ministry of Education between 1967 and 1968 under Brian McLaughlin. At the University of Malawi (1969–1970) he was a senior laboratory assistant working under Professors Peter Mwanza and Margaret Kalk. He has studied and worked in Scotland since 1970 and, briefly, Malawi as a government doctor and lecturer at the college of medicine. He has also worked in various medical fields since. He is currently a general medical practitioner in Lanarkshire and was, until August 2025, an honorary research fellow in the Institute of Health and Wellbeing, School of Politics and Social science, Glasgow University. Although his first article was published in Moni magazine in 1965, he only began working regularly as a freelance writer and journalist from 1981. He, by default, became a music and book researcher and publisher in 1988. Between 1991 and 1994 he was involved in the activism that led to a multiparty dispensation in Malawi Lwanda describes music as his first love

=== Publishing career ===
==== Pamtondo ====
Pamtondo was set up in 1988 by John Lwanda and George Claver with the aim of recording and disseminating Malawi music. It recorded and issued a number of releases of Malawi music, including recordings by Kasambwe, Alan Namoko and Chimvu, Saleta Phiri and AB Sounds, CheChamba, Kamwendo Brothers Band, as well as co-operating on some compilations.

==== Pamvision ====
Since 1994 Pamvision has been making Malawian music video recordings and films. The first recording was of Chief Chipoka Band (1994). Over twenty five different acts, ranging from gospel through popular music to traditional, have been video recorded, mostly for academic research. These include the Malawi National Dance Troupe, the Mount Sinai Choir (contemporary urban gospel), Sambangoma Dance Troupe (urban traditional dance and music troupe), Bondo Village Nyau Group (Chewa traditional dance and music), Kwandege Cultural Troupe, Chileka (traditional village ensemble), and the Mchinji Ingoma Troupe (Ngoni traditional dance and music).

==== Dudu Nsomba Publications ====
Established in 1993, Dudu Nsomba Publications publishes books on Malawi and Africa. Dudu Nsomba supports the Copyright Society of Malawi. The first book was Kamuzu Banda of Malawi (1993).

===== Books Edited and Published by Dudu Nsomba =====
- Cry of the Fish Eagle by Wilfred Plumbe, 1997. ISBN 0-9522233-9-2
- Living my destiny by Austin C Mkandawire, 1997. ISBN 0-9522233-3-3
- Living dangerously by Patrick O'Malley, 1998 ISBN 0-9532396-1-6
- Yoranivyoto by Felix Mnthali, 1998 ISBN 0-9532396-0-8.
- Suffering in Silence by Emily Mkamanga, 2000. ISBN 0-9522233-7-6
- The state and the labour movement in Malawi by Almiton Zeleza Manda, 2000 ISBN 0-9522233-6-8
- Old Watering Holes: Mayo to Serabu by Hilary Lyons, 2001. ISBN 0-9522233-8-4
- Malawian choral compositions by Mjura Mkandawire, 2011. ISBN 978-0-9532396-7-2
- The trial of Jack Mapanje: a play by Steven Ndhlovu, 2009. ISBN 9780952223351
- Mistaken identity by Richard Duwa, 2009. ISBN 978-0-9532396-3-4
- Yuraia Chatonda Chirwa: the faithful servant by Austin Mkandawire ISBN 0953239624

== Published works ==
=== Books ===
- Kamuzu Banda of Malawi: Promise, Power and Legacy (Kachere Publishing)-2010
- The Rhino's Lament (Poetry, Dudu Nsomba) -2008. ISBN 978-0-9532396-4-1
- Music, Culture and Orature: Reading the Malawi public sphere, 1949–2006. (Kachere Publishing)- 2008. ISBN 978-99908-87-33-4
- Colour, class and culture: A preliminary communication into the creation of doctors in Malawi, 2008. Dudu Nsomba ISBN 0-9532396-8-3
- Politics, Culture and Medicine in Malawi (Kachere)-2005. ISBN 978-99908-76-13-0
- Promises, Power Politics and Poverty: Democratic Transition in Malawi, 1961–1999 (Dudu Nsomba)- 1996. ISBN 0-9522233-4-1
- The second harvest (Novel, Dudu Nsomba)- 1994. ISBN 0-9522233-1-7
- Black thoughts from the Diaspora (Poetry, Dudu Nsomba)- 1994. ISBN 0-9522233-2-5
- Malawi: the state we are in? Montfort Media ISBN 978-99960-64-43-2 This is a book that addresses the current state of politics in Malawi in 2019.

=== Book chapters ===
- 2019. Afroma, Mbumba, Kwasa kwasa, Ingoma, Malipenga, Gule wamkulu, Reggae, Jazz Band in Malawi. In Bloomsbury Encyclopaedia of Sub-Saharan Africa.
- "Music and Social Protest (Malawi)", In J. H. Downing (Editor) Encyclopaedia of Social Movement Media. Sage, 2010
- "The informal and traditional: education for brain drain in Malawi’"In M. Beveridge, K. King, R. Palmer and R. Wedgewood (Eds) Reintegrating Education, skills and work in Africa: towards informal or knowledge economics?: Centre of African Studies, 2005.
- "Changes in the Malawi Political landscape between 1994 and 2004: Nkhope ya Agalatia" in Ott, Immink and Bhatupe The power of the vote: Malawi's 2004 parliamentary and presidential Elections, Zomba: Kachere, 2004.
- "Historical ruptures and continuities in the HIV/Aids story" In Kalipeni, E; Craddock, S.; Oppong, J. and Ghosh, J. eds. HIV/AIDS in Africa: Beyond Epidemiology. Oxford: Blackwell Publishers, 2004.
- "Tikutha: the political culture of the HIV/AIDS epidemic in Malawi".2002 In Englund, H (Ed) Democracy of Chameleons. Zomba: Kachere.
- African Issues: The African "Brain Drain" to the North: Pitfalls and Possibilities, Vol. 30, No. 1, 2002 (Published by: African Studies Association)
- "Malawi: Sounds Afroma". In World Music: the Rough Guide, London: Penguin, p 210 – 218, 2006.
- 2015 ‘Poverty, prophets and politics: ‘Marxist’ discourses in Malawi music, 1994 – 2012’. In Abiodun Salawu and Monica Chibita (eds). A Book of Readings: Indigenous language media, language politics and democracy in Africa. Basingstoke: Macmillan Palgrave.
- 2012. ‘Memory and Music: memorializing the Malawi Martyrs’ In KM Phiri, J McCracken and WO Mulwafu (eds) Malawi in Crisis: the 1959/60 Nyasaland State of Emergency and its Legacy. Zomba: Kachere, Chapter 17.
- 2011. ‘Edzi ndi dolo: singing aids in Malawi 1980 – 2008’ In Gregory Barz and Judah M. Cohen, (eds) The Culture of AIDS in Africa: Hope and Healing Through Music and the Arts New York: Oxford University Press, chapter 31.
- 2011. ‘Music and Social Protest in Malawi’ In D. H. Downey (ed) Encyclopedia of Social Movement media London: Sage Publications, pages 347 - 351.
- 2004: Changes in the Malawi Political landscape between 1994 and 2004’: Nkhope ya Agalatia in ‘The power of the vote: Malawi’s 2004 parliamentary and presidential Elections, Zomba: Kachere, pages 49 -86.
- 2004. ‘Historical ruptures and continuities in the HIV/Aids story’. In Kalipeni, E.; Craddock, S.; Oppong, J. and Ghosh, J. eds. HIV/AIDS in Africa: Beyond Epidemiology. Oxford: Blackwell Publishers, pages 29 – 42.

=== Journal articles ===
- Lwanda, John (1 November 2003). "The [in]visibility of HIV/AIDS in the Malawi public sphere". African Journal of AIDS Research. 2 (2): 113–126. doi:10.2989/16085906.2003.9626566. PMID 25872107. S2CID 32816685.
- Lwanda, John (2006). "Kwacha: The Violence of Money in Malawi's Politics, 1954–2004". Journal of Southern African Studies. 32 (3): 525–544. doi:10.1080/03057070600830482. JSTOR 25065121. S2CID 154732406.
- Lwanda, John (2003). "Mother's Songs: Male Appropriation of Women's Music in Malawi and Southern Africa". Journal of African Cultural Studies. 16 (2): 119–141. doi:10.1080/13696850500076146. JSTOR 3559465. S2CID 144877774.
- Lwanda, John (1 May 2009). "Music advocacy, the media and the Malawi political public sphere, 19582007". Journal of African Media Studies. 1 (1): 135–154. doi:10.1386/jams.1.1.135_1.
- Lwanda, John; Chanika, Emmie (2017). "Democracy, Donors and Dependency: the Rises and Falls of Non-Governmental and Civil Society Organisations' Agency in Malawi Opposition Politics, 1992 - 2017". The Society of Malawi Journal. 70 (1): 19–54. JSTOR 26382822.
- Lwanda, John (2014). "Chattering Classes: Radio, Rhythm and Resistance in 'multi-party' Malawi, 1994 - 2014". The Society of Malawi Journal. 67 (2): 19–33. JSTOR 24332679.
- Lwanda, John (2014). "Diaspora, Domicile and Debate: a preliminary artistic and cultural search for a Malawi identity from pre-colonial times to 2014". The Society of Malawi Journal. 67 (1): 16–45. JSTOR 24332664.
- Lizi, E; Lwanda, J; Matiti, H (March 2013). "Modern medical myth: 'More doctors in Manchester than in Malawi': A preliminary communication". Malawi Medical Journal. 25 (1): 20–21. PMC 3653194. PMID 23717751.
- Lwanda, John; Kanjo, Chipo (2013). "Computers, Culture and Music: the History of the Recording Industry in Malawi". The Society of Malawi Journal. 66 (1): 23–42. JSTOR 23611942.
- Chanika, Emmie; Lwanda, John L.; Muula, Adamson S. (2013). "Gender, Gays and Gain: The Sexualised Politics of Donor Aid in Malawi" (PDF). Africa Spectrum. 48 (1): 89–105. doi:10.1177/000203971304800105. JSTOR 43941321. S2CID 142060773.
- Lwanda, John L. (1 July 2010). "The Public Health Relevance of Contagious Rhythm: Infectious Diseases of 20th Century Musicians". Clinical Medicine & Research. 8 (2): 82–83. doi:10.3121/cmr.2010.917. PMC 2910106. PMID 20660930.
- Lwanda, John (2008). "The History of Popular Music in Malawi, 1891 to 2007: a preliminary communication". The Society of Malawi Journal. 61 (1): 26–40. JSTOR 29779253.
- Lwanda, John (1 January 2008). "Poets, culture and orature: A reappraisal of the Malawi political public sphere, 1953–2006". Journal of Contemporary African Studies. 26 (1): 71–101. doi:10.1080/02589000701782661. S2CID 144138396.
- Lwanda, John (August 2007). "Scotland, Malawi and medicine: Livingstone's legacy, I presume? An historical perspective". Scottish Medical Journal. 52 (3): 36–44. doi:10.1258/rsmsmj.52.3.36. PMID 17874713. S2CID 1442232.
- Clendennen, GW; Lwanda, J (2003). "David livingstone and southern africa's first recorded cases of sickle-cell anaemia?". The Journal of the Royal College of Physicians of Edinburgh. 33 (Suppl 12): 21–8. PMID 14969229.
- Lwanda, John (2002). "Paper tigers: The rise and fall of the independent media in Malawi, 1961–2001". The Society of Malawi Journal. 55 (1): 1–23. JSTOR 29779083.

== Family ==
Lwanda, who sometimes describes himself as a subsistence farmer, has seven grand children: Evelyn Onani, Muliko, Tazilwa, Amabel, Luthando, Tapokela, Anaia, and RJ.
