= Weekend Times =

Defunct weekly newspaper in Malawi

- The front page on the December 21/23, 2012 edition of the newspaper
- Type: Weekly newspaper
- Format: Tabloid
- Founded: 2009
- Ceased publication: January 2014
- Country: Malawi

The Weekend Times was a weekly newspaper based in Malawi and published by Blantyre Newspapers Limited (BNL). Founded in 2009, it quickly became popular in Malawi due to its reporting on entertainment and scandals not covered in other papers. The Times was temporarily banned by the National Archives of Malawi in late 2010, ostensibly for failing to register with the agency as required under the Print Publications Act. The ban was perceived by many as an attempt at suppressing the paper; the High Court granted an injunction allowing the paper to continue publication the following month and, after negotiations between governmental agencies and the publishers, the ban was lifted in 2011.

The Weekend Times ceased publication in January 2014; remaining staff were transferred to The Daily Times.

== Format and market ==
The Weekend Times was published on Fridays by Blantyre Newspapers Limited (BNL), which was owned by the family of former President Hastings Banda. It was Malawi's first and only tabloid newspaper. It was less political than other papers in Malawi, instead focusing on sports, entertainment, and celebrity stories. It published "frequent stories that exposed fraud and sex scandals of public figures" and took a sensationalist approach to reporting.

It was aimed at urban youth, though its high price made it hard for many to afford. One university teacher reported that his students would buy the paper and then share it with others.

The paper had a weekly section called "Action Girl", also known as "Page 8", which depicted a full-page picture of a woman in her underwear. It was an early example of sexualized marketing in what was a traditionally conservative country. Each week, "Page 8" featured a different model. The Nyasa Times reported in 2012 that they were paid K15,000 to appear. Alongside the image, the paper printed an invitation to "sexy, attractive and bootylicious young women" to appear in future editions. In general, the paper employed sexualized marketing and relied on gender stereotypes, making it controversial; it was popular amongst heterosexual men and less popular amongst female students.

== History ==
The paper was founded in 2009 under editor Limbani Moya. It was immediately popular in Malawi due to its coverage of scandals and other stories less often covered by other Malawian newspapers; by late 2010, its circulation had risen from 3,000 to 14,000.

On October 29, 2010, during the Bingu wa Mutharika government, the Weekend Times was banned under the 1958 Printed Publications Act, a colonial-era law requiring periodicals to register with the National Archives of Malawi and give the archives a copy of each edition. The ban was criticized domestically and internationally; other papers in the country operating without registration had not been banned and, according to The Zimbabwean, the BNL had already submitted paperwork to register the paper with the archives. The managing director of the Times said that they had only learnt of the ban from radio reports and had already printed the next edition. The ban came shortly after the paper had published a story accusing the wife of Zimbabwean president Robert Mugabe of having an affair. Those opposed to the ban perceived it as an attempt to suppress the paper's reporting rather than a genuine attempt to enforce the Printed Publications Act.

The BNL appealed the decision and the High Court granted an injunction the following November, allowing publication to continue. After negotiations with the BNL, the Ministry of Information and Civic Education, the Ministry of Justice, and the Ministry of Tourism, the BNL and the National Archives signed an agreement to have the Times registered in 2011 and the ban was lifted.

In 2011, a Weekend Times journalist was arrested after a man impersonating him sent messages to Member of Parliament Agnes Penemulungu, threatening to publish an unflattering story about her husband. The journalist reported on his own arrest, saying he had not been told why he had been arrested; he was released on bail after his lawyers argued that the messages had come from a man with a history of impersonating the journalist. The journalist was later convicted by the Malawian courts on a separate corruption charge.

In 2012, the police raided BNL offices after the Weekend Times published a story alleging that an official at the Chilomoni Police Station had sexually harassed an employee. The police produced the woman, who recanted, and nobody was arrested. The Nyasa Times said the incident was "seen as part of government’s continuous infringement on the freedom of the press in Malawi".

The paper ceased publication in January 2014; BNL had been dealing with losses and lawsuits related to the paper and, according to a source speaking to the Nyasa Times, had been struggling to find advertisers. Remaining staff were transferred to The Daily Times. At the time of dissolution, its editor was Clifton Kawanga and BNL reported the paper had a circulation of 27,000.
