= Media Council of Malawi =

- 2026 conference
- Abbreviation: MCM
- Formation: 1995 or November 1996
- Type: Non-statutory media self-regulatory body (press council)
- Legal status: Trust registered under the Trustees Incorporation Act
- Headquarters: Lilongwe, Malawi
- Members: 83 media houses, training institutions, journalists' associations and press clubs
- Executive Director: Moses Kaufa (since 2019)
- Chairperson: Wisdom Chimgwede (elected August 2020)
- Website: mediacouncil-mw.org

The Media Council of Malawi (MCM) is the self-regulatory body for the news media in Malawi. It is a non-statutory, membership-based organisation registered under the Trustees Incorporation Act, which maintains a code of ethics for journalists, mediates complaints about media conduct, and accredits journalists. First set up in the mid-1990s, the council has gone through more than one period of dormancy and was it was relaunched on 31 December 2019.

== History ==
=== Establishment and first revival ===
A 2023 Internews review of Malawian media law describes the council as the country's self-regulatory body and dates its establishment to 1995. The council's own account differs, giving November 1996. By that account, it ceased to function around 2001-2; in September 2005 the National Media Institute of Southern Africa (NAMISA) convened a stakeholders' meeting at Kuchawe Inn in Zomba with the aim of reviving it, and the council resumed work in February 2007. Its Code of Ethics and Professional Conduct dates from 1994.

Baldwin Chiyamwaka, who in February 2014 was appointed Malawi's Secretary for Information and Digitalisation, served as the council's executive director.

=== Dormancy and 2019 relaunch ===
The council had previously issued press cards to staff and freelance journalists, but that by August 2012 it had been dormant for about two years because of financial difficulties. The council was active again by 2016: in October of that year, its executive director, Vales Machila, issued a statement asking that journalists be protected and allowed to question President Peter Mutharika on his return from an extended stay in the United States. Machila died in 2018.

According to MISA Malawi, the council lay dormant for about three years, before efforts to revive it began in 2018. It was relaunched at Liwonde on 31 December 2019 when Moses Kaufa was presented as executive director. MISA Malawi said DW Akademie supported the design of a new self-regulation model and that media owners had committed to fund the council until it could sustain itself. MISA Malawi, the successor to NAMISA, says it funded the initial national consultative meeting on the revival; it described the revival as intended to ward off government plans to regulate the media, and encouraged media houses and journalists to apply for accreditation by the council.

In August 2020, Wisdom Chimgwede was elected chairperson of the council's National Governing Council, succeeding Wiseman Chijere Chirwa, in elections held in all three regions of the country.

== Structure and functions ==
The council describes its membership as comprising media houses, journalism training institutions, professional associations of journalists and press clubs, and reports 83 members. It operates through committees that direct a secretariat headed by the executive director. It says it enforces self-regulation by promoting an ombudsman's office in each media outlet, peer review in newsrooms and community media, and complaints committees based in local press clubs. Breaches of the code of ethics are handled by the council's Ethics, Complaints and Disciplinary Committee.

The council is a member of the Global Forum for Media Development.

UNESCO's 2022 assessment of media development in Malawi recommended that the media, supporting institutions and donors create a strong and sustainable self-regulation institution able to enforce professional standards and protect media independence.

== Activities ==
In March 2025, the council held a UNESCO-supported workshop bringing together journalists from the Northern Region and officers of the Malawi Police Service to discuss journalists' safety ahead of the September 2025 general election. The council was a member of the Presidential Debates Task Force, chaired by MISA Malawi, which organised presidential debates before the 2025 election as it had done in 2014 and 2019.

In July 2025 the council and MISA Malawi issued a joint statement reminding the state-owned Malawi Broadcasting Corporation of its duty under the Communications Act of 2016 to provide balanced and objective coverage, a statement noted by Human Rights Watch in its per-election commentary.

In August 2026 the council issued a statement, signed by Kaufa, expressing concern about reports by Zodiak Broadcasting Station and MBC Digital that President Mutharika had left the country, which the broadcasters later retracted, and about a pre-recorded interview on Luntha Television that the council said had aired speculative claims about the presidency without editorial challenge. The council said it was engaging the editors of the three outlets about their verification procedures, and called on media houses to strengthen internal self-regulation rather than rely on the statutory regulator, the Malawi Communications Regulatory Authority.

== Gender based violence and safety of women journalists ==
In February 2021, after a journalist was accused of rape, the council issued a statement a joint statement with MISA Malawi and the Association of Women in Media (AWOME) saying that the three bodies stood against sexual crimes and abuses against women and girls. Two months later a Malawian commentator quoted by the Media Diversity Institute criticised all three for staying silent when a Malawi Human Rights Commission report on the sexual harassment of women employers at the MBC was published. AWOME's president, Edyth Kambalame, told the institute that the media had been reticent about harassment in its own house, but that some advocacy was taking place out of the public view. In August 2023, the Malawi Irish Consortium on Gender-Based Violence launched a three-year advocacy strategy in Lilongwe and said it was working with the council and wanted the media to report gender-based violence ethically. At the same event, Kaufa asked organisations working on gender-based violence to treat the media as their partners in their campaigns rather than simply as a channel for their messages.

In June 2025 the council and AWOME held a training course on digital skills and online safety for women journalists in Blantyre. AWOME's chairperson, Dorothy Kachitsa, said that women in the media increasingly faced gender-based violence online, including harassment, threats and cyberbullying; Kaufa said that women journalists needed to understand the digital threats they faced and how to respond to them.

== See also ==
- Mass media in Malawi
- Women in the media in Malawi
- Malawi Media Women's Association
- Edyth Kambalame
- Journalism ethics and standards
- Media Institute of Southern Africa
- Teresa Ndanga
