= List of high commissioners of the United Kingdom to Seychelles =

UK High Commissioner to Seychelles
- Royal Arms of His Majesty's Government
- Incumbent; Jeff Glekin since October 2023
- Reports to: Foreign Secretary
- Residence: Victoria
- Inaugural holder: Sir Colin Allan; First high commissioner to Seychelles
- Formation: 1975
- Website: www.gov.uk/world/seychelles

The high commissioner of the United Kingdom to Seychelles is the United Kingdom's foremost diplomatic representative to the Republic of Seychelles, and in charge of the UK's diplomatic mission in Victoria.

As the Republic of Seychelles is a member of the Commonwealth, the UK and Seychelles exchange high commissioners rather than ambassadors.

== High commissioners to Seychelles ==
- 1975–1976: Sir Colin Allan
- 1976–1980: John Pugh
- 1980–1983: Eric Young
- 1983–1986: Colin Mays
- 1986–1989: Peter Smart
- 1989–1991: Guy Hart
- 1992–1995: John Sharland
- 1995–1997: Peter Thomson
- 1998–2002: John Yapp
- 2002–2004: Fraser Wilson
- 2004–2007: Diana Skingle
- 2007–2009: Fergus Cochrane-Dyet
- 2009–2012: Matthew Forbes
- 2012–2015: Lindsay Skoll
- 2015–2019: Caron Röhsler
- 2019–2023: Patrick Lynch
- 2023–present: Jeff Glekin
