= Mayamiko Nkoloma =

Malawian telecommunications engineer

Director General of the Malawi Communications Regulatory Authority
- Incumbent
- Assumed office 7 March 2026
- President: Peter Mutharika
- Preceded by: Daud Suleman

Personal details
- Party: Democratic Progressive Party
- Education: University of Malawi
- Occupation: Telecommunications engineer

Mayamiko Nkoloma is a Malawian telecommunications engineer and technology innovator who serves as the Director General of the Malawi Communications Regulatory Authority, the national regulator of the communications sector in Malawi.

== Career ==
Nkoloma has masters degrees in technology from Pune in India and another from the University of Sheffield in wireless technology.

He has worked as a lecturer in telecommunications engineering at the polytechnic which later became the Malawi University of Business and Applied Sciences. He has also been involved in research and innovation in areas such as Internet of things (IoT), smart infrastructure systems, and digital communications technologies. In 2017 he was exhibiting several applications of ICT technology. He developed systems that allowed the remote monitoring of water tank levels across Lilondwe for the local water board. The Malawi Communications Regulatory Authority paid for him to travel to South Korea to exhibit his company's creations.

In addition to his academic and technical work, Nkoloma has participated in national and international ICT initiatives and discussions related to telecommunications development and digital transformation in Malawi. In 2026 about 100 new privately funded communications towers were to be built in Malawi. Nkoloma spoke out about the need to avoid duplication and to encourage the involvement of students at MUST. Nkoloma had studied for his PhD at MUST.
