= Lindsay Katchika-Jere =

Malawian children's writer

Lindsay Katchika-Jere (born 15 May 1999) in Dedza, Malawi is a children's author, she published her first book The Missing Meteorite in 2020.

== Life and Career ==
Jere was raised by her single mother and grandmother and she studied mass communication at African Bible Colleges in Lilongwe, Malawi

She wrote her first book called The Missing Meteorite in 2020. The book was launched by Vera Kamtukule. Since then Jere has written five more books.

Jere is the founder of a non-profit organisation called the Sprout Foundation, which aims at improving the lives of children and women in underprivileged communities. Her foundation has carried out several works of charity including donating books at Biwi LEA primary school in Lilongwe.

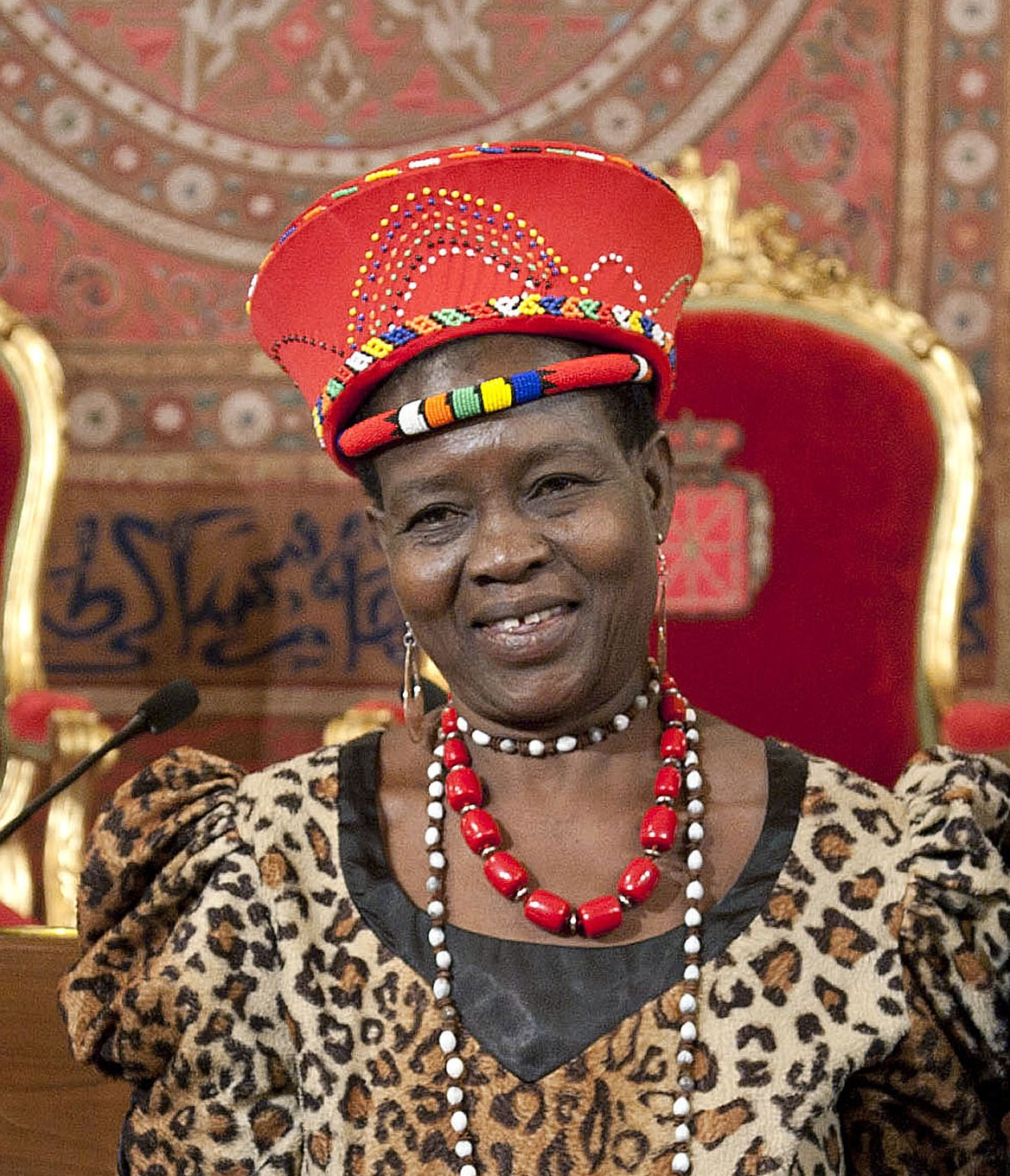
Chief Kachindamoto

⋅

In 2022 she published two books about inspiring Malawians. Taonere's Dream: The True Story of a Malawian Paralympian tells the story of Taonere Banda who became Malawi's first paralympic athlete. She competed in the Olympics in 2020 despite her lack of vision. Her other book that year was Super Chief: The story of Chief Theresa Kachindamoto which was illustrated by Kate Mkandawire. Chief Theresa Kachindamoto found herself leading 900,000 people. She used her power to end the under-age marriages of 3,500 girls and send them back to school.

She has won two prizes in her career: in 2023 she was the first runner up in the Wakini Kuria Prize for children's literature; and her story 'Between the Walls' was first runner up in the 2025 Makewana's Daughters short story competition.

== Other Publications ==
- Outlive the Labels (Volume IV): International Sisterhood of Survivors (Africa).
