= Gift Kadzamira =

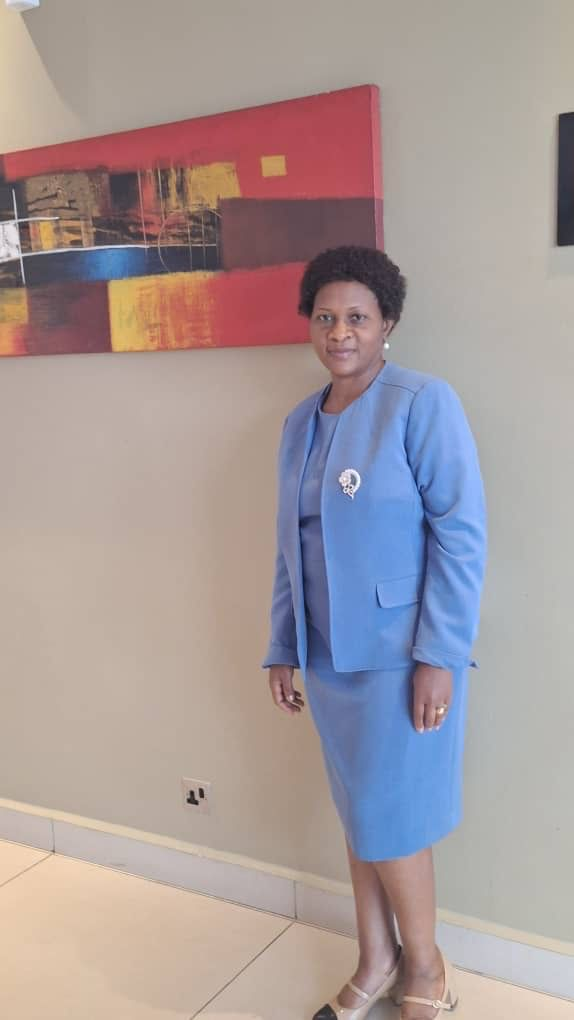
- Education: University of Malawi (Bsc); Robert Gordon University (Masters)
- Occupations: Librarian and Technologist
- Employer(s): College of Medicine; National Commission for Science and Technology (NCST); US Embassy - Malawi
- Spouse: Dalitso Kadzamira
- Children: 3
- Parent(s): Charles and Ellen Matabwa

Gift Kadzamira is a Malawian and the Director General of the National Commission for Science and Technology NCST. She has worked at the College of Medicine now Kamuzu University of Health Sciences (KuHES) as a College Librarian and the US Embassy Malawi office as the Director for Information Resource Centre. She is a governing council member for the African Centre for Technology Studies. She is also a board member of the National Library Service of Malawi and a member of Malawi Library Association.

== Biography ==
Kadzamira holds a Bachelor of Science in Biology from the University of Malawi. She also has a Master of Science in Electronic Information Management from Robert Gordon University in Scotland. She also holds several postgraduate qualifications such as technology, innovation and entrepreneurship certificate from the Harvard Kennedy School and transformational innovation, transformation and resilience for sustainable development certificate from Lund University in Sweden. She also holds science diplomacy certificate from the American Association for the Advancement of Science and the World Academy of Sciences.

Kadzamira was appointed the Director General of the National Commission for Science and Technology on September 18, 2023. Before her appointment, she also served as the Acting Director General of NCST. In 2021, during the pandemic, she was the Director of Documentation and Information Services at the (NCST) Her department was responsible for managing information on Science, Technology, and Innovation (STI). National Commission for Science and Technology is a government agency responsible for advancement of research, science, technology and Innovation (RSTI). To achieve NCST mandate, Kadzamira has solicited funding such as the Science Granting Council Initiative, the Grand Challenge Project, and the Bill and Melinda Gates Moving Forward Project.

The UN Technology Bank and The Network of African Science Academies created the Academy of Sciences in Malawi as part of their support for least developed nations in 2021. The NCST and the Ministry of Education's Directorate of Science, Technology, and Innovation agreed to support the new academy. Agnes Nyalonje, who was then the minister of education, expected the new academy to work closely with government bodies including the NCST.

== Private life ==
Kadzamira family lived at an agricultural research station, and that's where her research interest began. She has a twin sister Luckson. While growing up, Kadzamira observed her parents doing practical research. She also admired female graduates who worked at the research station and these graduates were her role models.
