= Madise (surname) =

Madise is a surname. Notable people with the name include:

- Chimwemwe Madise (born 1992), Malawian footballer
- Adrian Madise (born 1980), American football player
- Nyovani Madise, Malawian economist
- Ülle Madise (born 1974), Estonian lawyer
