= Timwa Lipenga =

Malawian writer and academic

- Education: University of Malawi (BA) University of Aberdeen (PhD)
- Occupations: Writer, academic
- Employer: University of Malawi
- Notable work: Lomathinda: Rose Chibambo (2019)
- Father: Ken Lipenga

Timwa Lipenga is a Malawian writer and academic. A lecturer in French at the University of Malawi, she is the author of Lomathinda: Rose Chibamba Speaks (2019), the first book written about the life of the Malawian independence activist and politician Rose Chibambo. Lipenga is also the director of Makewana's Daughters, an online forum for Malawian women writers.

== Education and early career ==
Lipenga is the daughter of Malawian politician and writer Ken Lipenga. Lipenga studied English and French literature as an undergraduate, and holds a doctorate in French from the University of Aberdeen. Before entering academia, she worked as a features writer and sub-editor for the Nation Publications.

== Academic career ==
Lipenga lectures in the Department of French at the University of Malawi, formerly Chancellor College, where she teaches African and Caribbean literature. Her research is interdisciplinary and includes life writing, popular culture and narrative. She is an external member of the Centre for Comparative Literature and Translation at the University of Glasgow.

== Fiction ==
Lipenga's short story "Swimming Partners" appeared in African Road: New Writing from Southern Africa (PEN South Africa, 2006). Her story "Duty" was selected for the 2016 Caine Prize African Writers' Workshop and published in the prize's anthology The Daily Assortment of Astonishing Things (2016), alongside workshop stories by NoViolet Bulawayo, Elnathan John, Namwali Serpell and Okwiri Oduor.

== Lomathinda ==
Lomathinda: Rose Chibambo Speaks was published by Logos Open Culture in December 2019, with funding from the Embassy of Switzerland to Zimbabwe and Malawi. It is the first book written about the life of Rose Chibambo, who organised women within the Nyasaland African Congress. She was detained during the 1959 state of emergency. Chibambo became the first woman in Malawi's post-independence cabinet and spent nearly three decades in exile. The book was discussed with Lipenga in a research seminar at Chancellor College in December 2019, and a transcript was published in the Journal of Humanities. The cover features a mixed media work by Malawian artist Lerato Honde, co-founder of the Wona Collective.

== Makewana's Daughters ==
Lipenga founded Makewana's Daughters with Hendrina Kachapila-Mazizwa of the University of Malawi's History Department, and Ranka Primorac of the University of Southampton, as an online forum for Malawian women's writing. Lipenga said the founders began with the assumption that Malawian women were not writing, and found instead that they were writing but had nowhere to publish. The online forum produces short stories, poems, songs and personal narratives. The forum has also published a comic strip, Nerdy Niva, that Lipenga has said highlights the scarcity of female protagonists written by female authors in comics.
