= Agnes Penemulungu =

Malawian politician

- Died: April 29, 2019
- Citizenship: Malawi
- Occupation: Politician

Agnes Penemulungu (died 2019) was a Member of Parliament for Lilongwe South Constituency in Malawi. She was elected on President Mutharika's Democratic Progressive Party ticket.

== Life ==
In 2011, a Weekend Times journalist was arrested after a man impersonating him sent messages to Penemulungu when she was a Member of Parliament. The messages threatened to publish an unflattering story about her husband. She was married to Malawian businessman Lucky Penemulungu.The journalist reported on his own arrest, saying he had not been told why he had been arrested; he was released on bail after his lawyers argued that the messages had come from a man with a history of impersonating the journalist. The journalist was later convicted by the Malawian courts on a separate corruption charge.

== Presence at Mutharika's death ==
Penemulungu was in a meeting with Bingu wa Mutharika when he collapsed and died in 2012. Mutharika's death led to the constitutional crisis in Malawi. She went on bed rest shortly after. She was questioned officially by the Commission of Inquiry ordered by Malawi President Joyce Banda as part of an information gathering exercise to establish circumstances surrounding the President Mutharika's death but has commented that he "stopped talking and collapsed."

== Death ==
Agnes Penemulungu was standing for re-election as a candidate in the 2019 Malawian general election. However, on April 29, 2019 she died unexpectedly. Parliamentary elections for her constituency, Lilongwe South, were postponed until after the general election.
