= National Commission for Science and Technology =

National Commission for Science and Technology (NCST)

Agency overview
- Formed: 2003
- Headquarters: Lilongwe; 13.9586257°S 33.7888653°E
- Agency executive: Gift Kadzamira, Director General

Malawi's National Commission for Science and Technology (NCST) is based in Lilongwe, Malawi.

== History ==
The NCST was established in 2003 as the result of the previous year's Science and Technology Policy. In 2015, the NCST joined the Science Granting Councils Initiative Africa which encourages collaboration between the various Science Granting Councils in sub-Saharan Africa.

The United Nations Technology Bank for Least Developed Countries and the Network of African Science Academies created the Academy of Sciences in Malawi in 2021. The NCST and the Ministry of Education's Directorate of Science, Technology, and Innovation agreed to support the new academy. Agnes Nyalonje, who was then the minister of education, expected the new academy to work closely with government bodies including the NCST.

The COVID-19 pandemic was credited with disrupting collaborative research that the NCST was involved with in 2022. NCST's work with the Research Council of Zimbabwe (RCZ), International Research and Development Centre in Canada and the Botswana Innovation Hub was effected. Even statistical analysis was delayed as the software was only accessible in labs that were locked down. Malawi was collaborating with their opposite numbers in Zimbabwe and Botswana to improve their joint research regarding agriculture biotechnology and minerals.

Gift Kadzamira, who had been the acting Director General, was formally appointed to be the Director General of the National Commission for Science and Technology in September 2023.
