= Wona Collective =

Malawian women-led arts collective

- Formation: March 2020; 6 years ago
- Founder: Lerato Honde, Alinafe Malonje
- Headquarters: Lilongwe, Malawi
- Website: wonacollective.com

Wona Collective is a Malawian women-led arts collective, media production company, and communications consultancy based in Lilongwe, Malawi. Co-founded in 2019 by Lerato Honde and Alinafe Malonje, it uses art and media to document the experiences of Malawian women and marginalised groups through poetry, podcasts, illustration, and music. The name "wona" comes from the Chichewa word meaning see.

== History ==
The collective grew out of a meeting between visual artist Lerato Honde and writer Alinafe Malonje in 2019, when Malonje visited an exhibition of Honde's work in Lilongwe. The two first collaborated on Seasons, an animated poetry collection. They registered Wona Collective in March 2020.

== Projects ==
Wona's first substantial project, produced for the 2019 Global 16 Days of Activism Against Gender-Based Violence campaign, brought together sixteen Malawian women poets in a collection titled 16 Days of Poetry against 16 Days of Activism. The poems addressed experiences of sexual violence and the effects of rape culture and were intended to break the silence surrounding sexual violence that is entrenched in cultural norms. The collective produces To Whoever is Listening, a podcast in which contributors anonymously recount experiences of mental illness, gender-based violence and discrimination, including accounts from LGBTQ+ women in Malawi. The Letters series consists of podcast episodes in which Malawian women read letters to their younger selves or their work, accompanied by conversations with the founders.

Members of the collective have exhibited in Lilongwe, including a joint visual art exhibition by Honde and Eve Chisambiro in November 2019. In 2022, the collective partnered with Utaweleza Malawi to fully manage and produce the live season finale for the Feministing While Malawian podcast hosted by Umba Zalira and Lusungu Kalanga.

== Recognition and partnerships ==
In 2022 the founder Honde and Malonje were named Young Trailblazers by the We Are Family Foundation for their work with the collective.

Wona Collective is associated with Transform Education, a coalition of youth-led feminist networks hosted by the United Nations Girls' Education Initiative. In 2021, the collective hosted a Solidarity Circle in Malawi, one of two such gatherings held under the initiative worldwide.

The Collective was selected in the Design and Craft category of the Creation Africa 2 Top 50, announced in February 2026, a programme run by the French Ministry of Europe and Foreign Affairs, the Embassy of France and the French Institute of South Africa.

== Notable podcast guests ==
- Sarai Chisala-Tempelhoff, 2021, "Letters from Daisy & Sunflower: Read by Mphatso Makamo and Sarai Chisala-Tempelhoff"
- Professor Address Malata appeared on the episode "Letters to Nurses and Midwives"
- Justice Anastasia Msosa appeared on the episode "Letter to the Road not Taken from Justice Anastasia Msosa"
- Author and academic Timwa Lipenga appeared on the episode "Letter to Rose Chibambo (Part 1) from Timwa Lipenga".
- Netballer Mary Waya appeared on the episode "Letter to Athletes"
