= Janet Karim =

Malawian journalist and diplomat (born 1954)

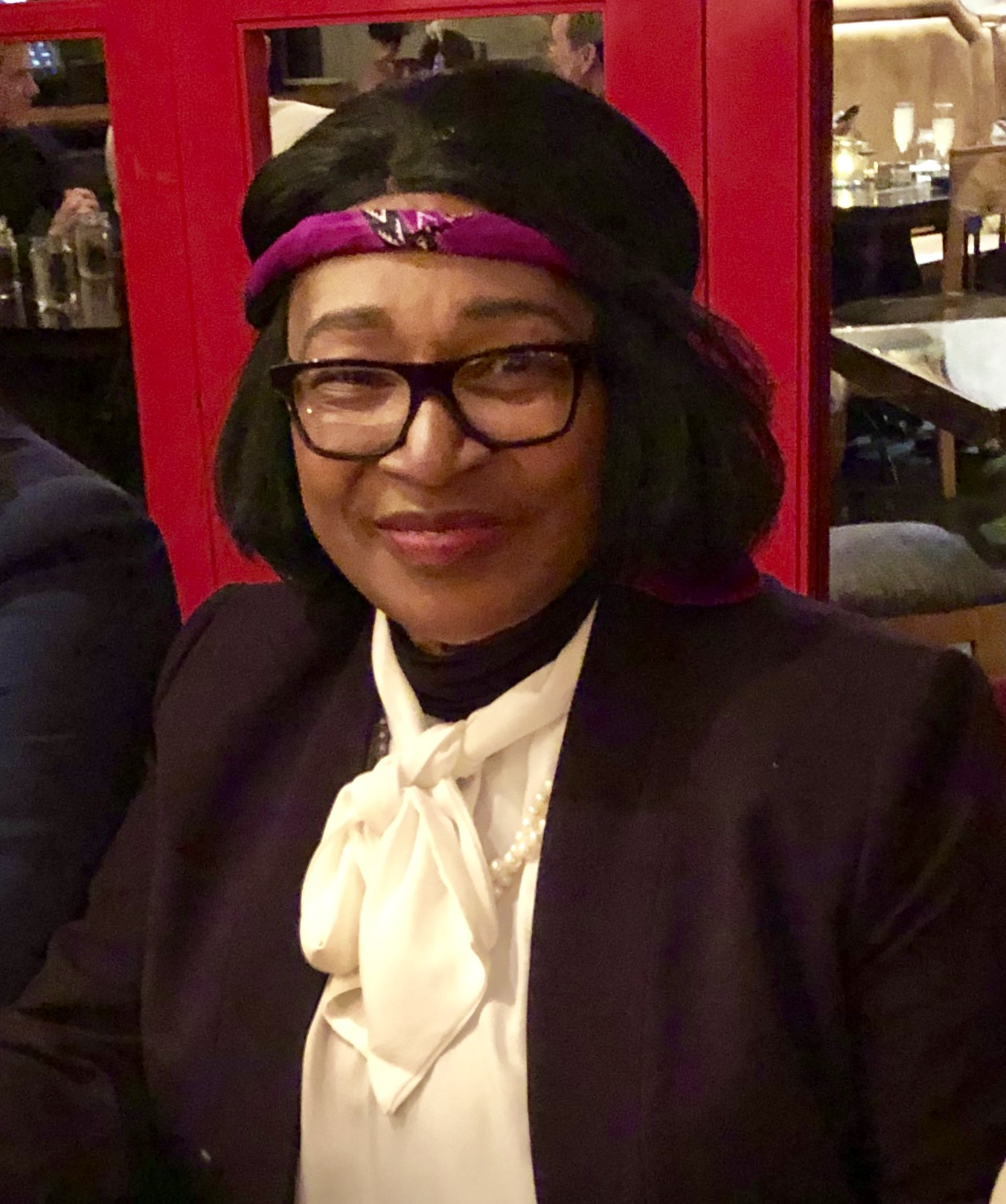
- Janet Karim in 2019
- Born: Janet Mbekeani; 1954 (age 71–72)
- Citizenship: Malawian
- Education: Scarsdale High School; University of Malawi; St. John's University
- Occupations: Journalist and diplomat
- Organization: Malawi Media Women's Association
- Father: Wales Nyemba Mbekeani

Janet Zeenat Karim (born 1954) is a Malawian journalist and diplomat. The founder of the publications Woman Now and the Independent, Karim is one of only a handful of well-known female writers in the country. She served in the Permanent Mission of Malawi to the United Nations from 2007 to 2014.

== Early life and education ==
Janet Karim was born Janet Mbekeani in 1954. Her father was Wales Nyemba Mbekeani, a diplomat who served as Malawi's envoy to the United Nations. Due to her father's career, she spent a significant portion of her childhood in New York, where she graduated from Scarsdale High School in 1972.

Karim returned to Malawi, where she joined Chancellor College and the local writer's group. She received her bachelor's degree from the University of Malawi in 1979.

She later received a master's degree in global development and social justice from St. John's University in 2014.

== Career ==
Karim started her career teaching at public schools in Malawi, but after failing to complete a master's degree at London School of Economics, she instead embarked on a career in journalism. She began writing for the Malawi Daily Times, then the only newspaper at the country. She then became an editor at the Times' sister publication, Malawi News.

After leaving Malawi News, Karim founded and served as editor of Woman Now magazine, the first women's magazine in the country. In 1993, she also founded the Independent newspaper. Karim and her peers had developed a complex understanding of how to navigate the country's censorship rules during the one-party era, which eased the way for her to start her own publications. Later on, the Independent often voiced opposition to the policies of the new ruling government.

Karim also founded the Malawi Media Women's Association. Through the women's media organization, she helped establish Dzimwe Community Radio, with assistance from UNESCO and later USAID.

Alongside her work as a journalist, Karim became an activist and advocate for women's rights and safety. She was also active in the Society of Women Living With AIDS. She spoke out in favor of including women in the media, saying in 1998, "The African media cannot go into the 21st century hopping on one leg. Women must be partners in the future of Africa."

In lamenting the lack of women in Malawi's literary sphere in 2013, the president of the Malawi Writers Union identified Karim as one of only a handful of well-known women writers in the country, alongside Emily Mkamanga and Walije Gondwe.

From 2007 to July 2014, Karim was appointed, first secretary, to serve in the Permanent Mission of Malawi to the United Nations, where her father once served as ambassador. She stayed in New York until 2015 so that she could complete work including her degree. At the U.N., she worked on social, cultural, and human rights issues, representing the country at UNICEF and other bodies.

In 2019 Karim was writing for the Nyasa Times listing the problems with the recent election.

== Publications ==
- The Independent Press in Malawi: A Critical Analysis (1994)
- Zinyama Village Road (2016)
