= Mabvuto Banda =

Malawian freelance journalist

- Born: Zambia
- Occupation: journalist
- Notable credit(s): The Nation, Inter Press Service, Mail & Guardian Reuters News Agency
- Title: investigative journalist

Mabvuto Banda is an investigative journalist from Malawi. Banda is a well respected journalist in Malawi and on the continent. His writings have been subject of controversy due to a strong stance against corruption and other political exposés. He has been arrested five times due to his work.

== Personal ==
He was born in Zambia.

== Career ==
He has been a correspondent for many news agencies, including Reuters, ABC News, Inter Press Service. He is a regular correspondent for The Nation.

Some of his major stories was an exposé on a plot by the UDF under President Bakili Muluzi to amend the Constitution to allow him to run for a third term in office. This galvanized civil society to act against this. Banda's work on anti-corruption also led to the arrest of a petroleum firm's CEO on charges of corruption involving US$11 million. He was embezzling millions of dollars into his offshore accounts. Mabvuto is also credited for exposing a corrupt minister of education who abused state funds to finance his wedding. The minister became the first cabinet member to be fired and convicted in democratic Malawi. He also was behind the expulsion of the British high commissioner to Malawi in 2011 when he wrote about a British cable that detailed how Mutharika was being viewed by Western diplomats. The expulsion of the British envoy increasingly pushed Malawi into diplomatic isolation.

== Mutharika administration journalism arrests ==
In 2005, Banda reported that then President Bingu wa Mutharika had moved out of the presidential palace due to the fear of haunting in the presidential palace. The president's religious affairs adviser, Malani Mtonga, had reported this but later denied it. Mtonga had reported that the President was hearing "strange noises" and "felt a strange presence hanging around him" at night. Another independent renowned journalist, Raphael Tenthani, had reported the same story. Both Mr. Tenthani and Mabvuto Banda were at their homes in Blantyre and detained at police headquarters in Lilongwe. Mabvuto was going to be charged with "publishing false information that is likely to cause [a] breach of peace".

In March 2012 Banda also made headlines in the Malawi press for challenging the Minister of Information, Patricia Kaliati, about the role of government.

== Awards ==
John Manyarara (Southern Africa) Investigative Journalism Award, 2006 Reuters News Agency Journalist of the Year, 2006 Runner-up World Water competition, 2003 (Japan) Investigative Journalist of the Year, 2000, Journalist of the year, 2001, Investigative Journalist of the year, 2002, journalist of the year, 2004, 05 Environmental journalist of the year, 2013 African Story challenge finalist, 2013
