= Fergus Cochrane-Dyet =

British diplomat

Fergus Cochrane-Dyet OBE
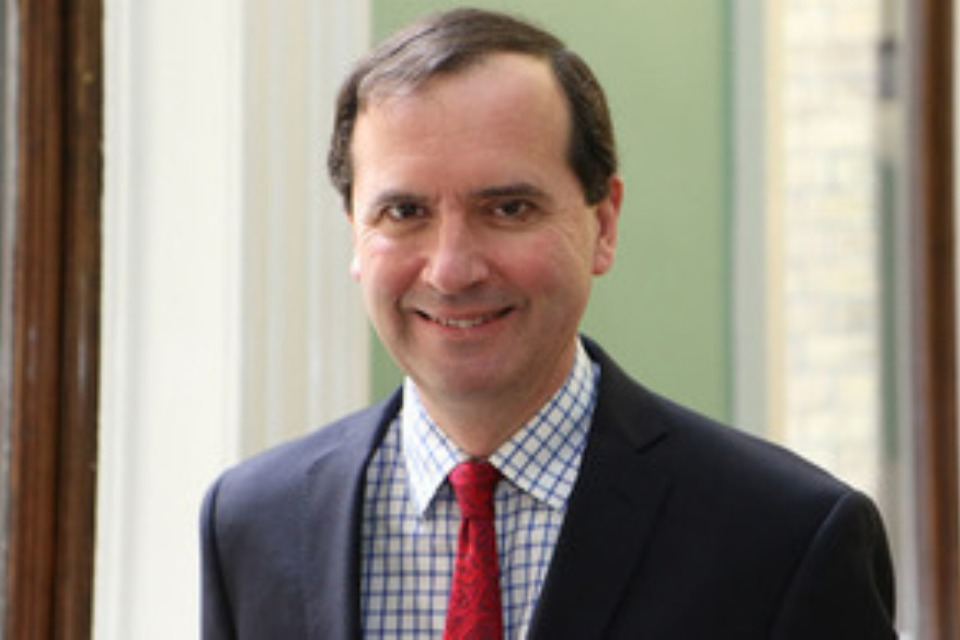

High Commissioner of the United Kingdom to Zambia
- In office 21 April 2016 – August 2019
- Monarch: Elizabeth II
- Prime Minister: David Cameron; Theresa May; Boris Johnson
- Preceded by: Lucy Joyce
- Succeeded by: Nicholas Wooley

High Commissioner of the United Kingdom to Malawi
- In office September 2009 – 27 April 2011
- Monarch: Elizabeth II
- Prime Minister: Gordon Brown; David Cameron
- Preceded by: Richard Wildash
- Succeeded by: Kirk Hollingsworth

High Commissioner of the United Kingdom to Seychelles
- In office 2007 – 2009
- Monarch: Elizabeth II
- Prime Minister: Gordon Brown; Tony Blair
- Preceded by: Diana Skingle
- Succeeded by: Matthew Forbes

Personal details
- Born: 16 January 1965 (age 61)
- Spouse: Susie Cochrane-Dyet (m. 1987)
- Children: 3
- Education: Felsted School

Fergus Cochrane-Dyet OBE (born 16 January 1965) is a British diplomat who served as High Commissioner to Zambia from April 2016 until August 2019, being succeeded by Nicholas Woolley. In 2011, while serving as High Commissioner to Malawi, he was declared persona non grata and expelled from the country because of controversial comments he made in a leaked diplomatic cable.

== Education and career ==
Cochrane-Dyet attended first Witham Hall prep school and then Felsted School in Essex, England from 1978 until 1983. He graduated from Durham University in 1987 with a degree in Anthropology.

Cochrane-Dyet has held diplomatic positions representing the British government in Afghanistan, Australia, Guinea, Indonesia, Libya, Nigeria, and Zambia. His first position as head of mission was as the British High Commissioner to the Seychelles from 2007 to 2009. In September 2009, he became the British High Commissioner to Malawi. After his expulsion from Malawi, he spent a year as Deputy Head of Mission in Helmand, Afghanistan. He was appointed British Ambassador to Liberia in 2013 and was replaced in April 2015. He was appointed High Commissioner to Zambia in February 2016 and took up the post when he presented his letter of credence to President Lungu on 21 April 2016.

=== Leaked diplomatic cable controversy ===
In April 2011, the Malawian newspaper The Nation published an article quoting a leaked diplomatic telegram from Cochrane-Dyet in which he wrote that Malawian President Bingu wa Mutharika was "becoming ever more autocratic and intolerant of criticism". On 27 April, Malawi's government declared Cochrane-Dyet persona non grata and expelled him from the country. The United Kingdom responded by expelling Malawi's acting high commissioner, Ms. Flossie Chidyaonga. British aid to Malawi was also cut off.

In October 2011, Mutharika apologised for the expulsion of Cochrane-Dyet and lifted his ban from Malawi. Mutharika died in April 2012 and shortly afterward the British Foreign Secretary announced that a new high commissioner would be appointed.

== Personal life and awards ==
Cochrane-Dyet has been married to Susie since 1987, with three sons: James, Alex and William. He is currently enrolled at St Hugh's College, University of Oxford, reading for an MSc in African Studies, where he rows for the St Hugh's College Boat Club.

Cochrane-Dyet was appointed OBE "for services to British foreign policy" in the Queen's Birthday Honours of 2015.

== Notes ==
Diplomatic posts
Preceded by Diana Skingle	High Commissioner to the Seychelles; 2007–2009	Succeeded by Matthew Forbes
Preceded by Richard Wildash	High Commissioner to Malawi; 2009–2011	Succeeded by Kirk Hollingsworth
Preceded by Ian Hughes	Ambassador to Liberia; 2013–2015	Succeeded by David Belgrove
Preceded by James Thornton	High Commissioner to Zambia; 2016–2019	Succeeded by Nicholas Woolley
