= .mw =

Internet country-code top level domain for Malawi

- Introduced: 3 January 1997
- TLD type: Country code top-level domain
- Status: Active
- Registry: Malawi Sustainable Development Network Programme
- Sponsor: Malawi Sustainable Development Network Programme
- Intended use: Entities connected with Malawi
- Actual use: Used in Malawi
- Registration restrictions: None
- Structure: Registrations are taken at second and third level
- Documents: Policies
- Dispute policies: Malawi SDNP Dispute Policy, which in turn defers to UDRP
- Registry website: www.nic.mw

.mw is the Internet country code top-level domain (ccTLD) for Malawi. After initial delegation, in 2002 the IANA recommended that administration of the ccTLD be transferred to the Malawi Sustainable Development Network Programme from Computer Solutions Ltd. The recommendation was implemented.

Registry prices for .mw domains are US$40 per year.

== Second-level domains ==
In addition to registrations directly at the second level, it is also possible to register third-level names beneath these names. For the most part, the descriptions of the types of organizations each domain is for are advisory, and are not enforced.

- ac.mw – academic institutions
- co.mw – commercial organisations
  - com.mw – an alternative for commercial organisations
- coop.mw – cooperative associations
- edu.mw – degree-granting academic institutions
- gov.mw – restricted to government
- int.mw – international treaty organisations
- museum.mw – museums, historical, documentation or display organisations
- net.mw – networking organisations
- org.mw – non-profit organisations
