= Walije Gondwe =

Walije Gondwe (born 1936) is a writer who was the first Malawian woman novelist to have her work published. Most of her books are young adult fiction published in the 1980s and 1990s. She now runs an educational charity, Vinjeru.

== Early years ==
She grew up in a devout Christian family in Kayiwonanga in Mzimba. Some years after leaving school she started secretarial training and won a scholarship to complete her studies in the UK. Because of political problems in Malawi the scholarship became invalid but Gondwe stayed in the UK.

== Writing ==
Gondwe began writing in England. Her book called Will the African Flowers Bloom, due to be published in London in the 1970s, was abandoned when a branch of Oxford University Press ran into difficulty.

Her first published book, Love's Dilemma, appeared in 1985 in Macmillan's Pacesetters series. Since then she has been called Malawi's first female novelist or "one of the first female writers in the country". Although other authors have followed in her footsteps there are still not many women writers from Malawi. In 2013 the president of the Malawian Writers Union said that there was a shortage of female authors and that the "only known women writers in the country are Emily Mkamanga, Walije Gondwe and Janet Karim". One of her later books, Double Dating, was also her bestselling novel and won an award in 1994.

== Charity work ==
In 1999 she founded the charity Vinjeru Education after giving up writing. The charity collects books and other educational supplies donated in the UK and distributes them in Malawi, especially in remoter areas. Vinjeru says Gondwe "splits her time between Malawi and the UK". In 2016 Gondwe won a Lifetime Achiever Award from the Malawi High Commission in the UK, which gives Achievers Awards to successful Malawians in the diaspora.

Gondwe has a daughter and a son.
