= Nyovani Madise =

Malawian economist

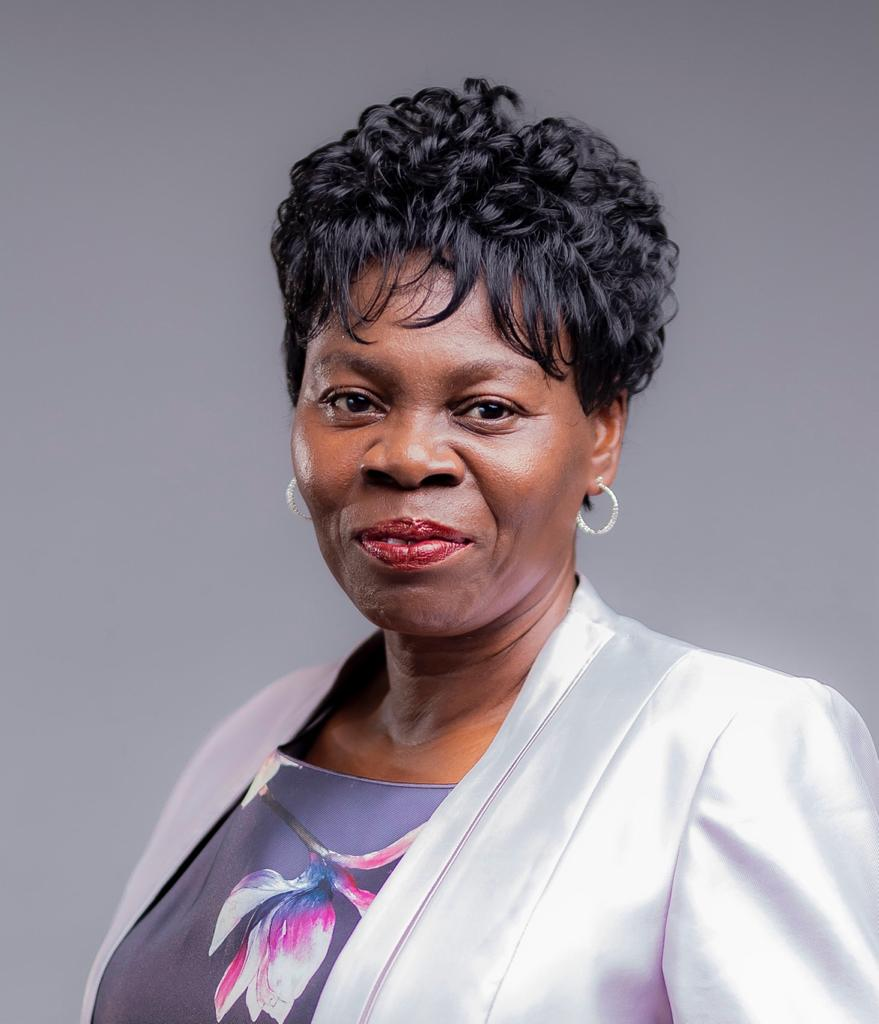
- Education: University of Malawi, University of Southampton
- Employer: African Institute for Development Policy
- Mother: Nyokase Madise

Nyovani Janet Madise became the director of research and sustainable development policies and head of the Malawi office of the African Institute for Development Policy in 2018. She is an advisor to the World Health Organization and a former professor at the University of Southampton in demography and social statistics. Nyovani has over 100 peer-reviewed research publications that focus on global health issues to highlight the influence of social and economic factors on health in low-income countries.

She was a key advisor to Melinda French Gates regarding family planning in Africa as Gates for both her 2014 TEDx in Berlin and her London Family Planning Summit in 2012. In 2007, Madise addressed the 40th Session of the United Nations Commission on Population and Development in New York, highlighting the importance of understanding and investing in the health and education of Africa’s next generation.

== Education and work ==
Madise was born in Blantyre, Malawi, to a father who was an accountant and a mother, Nyokase Madise, who worked in broadcasting. She attended the University of Malawi, completing an undergraduate in mathematics and statistics in 1983. She moved to the UK to pursue a Master of Science degree and then a PhD in social statistics at the University of Southampton.

In 2016, she received an honorary doctoral degree (DSc) from the University of Aberdeen in recognition of her research on healthcare in Africa. Madise has worked as a lecturer at the University of Malawi and as a senior research scientist at the African Population and Health Research Center in Kenya. She has held many senior management roles, including associate dean of research in Southampton University, deputy head of school; university lead for equality, diversity, and inclusion; director of public policy, and director of the Centre for Global Health, Population, Poverty, and Policy at Southampton University.

At the University of Malawi, Madise was among a group of women academics from other disciplines who supported Isabel Apawo Phiri's research on women's issues at Chancellor College, and was one of four researchers (including Linda Semu and Flora Nankhuni) behind a study of rape and sexual harassment at Malawian educational institutions presented at a University of Malawi research dissemination conference in July 1995.

== Advisory experience ==
Madise was one of fifteen scientists appointed by the UN Secretary-General to write the 2023 Global Sustainable Development Report. The report was launched as the world approaches the halfway point of the 2030 Agenda and struggles to rebuild in the aftermath of the COVID-19 pandemic. It sought to highlight solutions that can accelerate progress on the SDGs. Madise was appointed Co-Chair of the next Global Environment Outlook Assessment Report.

Madise is a Vice-Chair of the Population Council Board of Trustees, where she leads special projects. She is also a Trustee of the Liverpool School of Tropical Medicine.

She was the Board Director] of AmplifyChange Ltd, which supports advocacy and activist groups working on these five priority areas: (i) Eliminating gender-based violence, (ii) Removing barriers to safe abortion, (iii) Challenging stigma and discrimination, (iv)Improving sexual health of young people, and (v) Increasing access to reproductive health.

Madise sat on the Advisory Group of Population and Public Health Early Career Advisory Group and she was the Vice-Chair of the University of Malawi Council.

== Scholarship ==
=== "Is Poverty a Driver for Risky Sexual Behaviour? Evidence from National Surveys of Adolescents in four African Countries" (2007) ===
Madise co-authored this article with Eliya Zulu and James Ciera. The research was motivated by two factors; firstly, the high prevalence of HIV among young people in Africa. Secondly, the fact that there did not seem to be an academic consensus on the relationship between poverty and risky sexual behaviour in Africa; the results would depend on the type of data collected, the number of participants and what the working definition of sexual intercourse was. At the Macro level research has shown that poorer countries suffer more than wealthier ones when there is an HIV epidemic. On a Micro level though some of the wealthiest countries in Sub-Saharan Africa such as Botswana and South Africa have the highest rates of HIV in the region. This is counterintuitive to data at the Macro level which supports the fact that poorer countries will likely have fewer resources to invest in prevention services. Finally, on an grass root level, there seems to be a positive relationship between wealth and the prevalence of HIV on the African continent. The spread of HIV in African countries is linked to mobility. Wealthier people will travel and expose themselves more to people with HIV thus facilitating the spread.

Madise, Zulu and Cierra set out to address this by collecting data from four countries Burkina Faso, Malawi, Uganda and Ghana with over 19,500 participants between the ages of 12 and 19. These countries were chosen because they would provide different levels and contexts of HIV prevalence. Their results showed that girls who are in the wealthiest quintiles in Malawi, Burkina Faso and Ghana had later sexual debut compared to those who are poor. This was not the case for Uganda. Furthermore, wealthy adolescents were more likely to have used condoms in their last sexual act. Finally in Uganda and Ghana wealth status had a positive relationship with the likelihood to have more partners. The report that poverty increases the likelihood of poor girls having sex is consistent with research that has shown that this is done in exchange for gifts and money. The paper also highlights that adolescents who are in school are more likely to engage in sexual intercourse before those who are not in school. The paper concludes that poverty influences the likelihood of risky sexual behaviour, especially among young females.

=== "Is There an Urban Advantage in Child Survival in Sub-Saharan Africa? Evidence From 18 Countries in the 1990s" (2011) ===
Madise co-authored this article with Philippe Bocquier and Eliya Msiyaphazi Zulu. Observing the pattern of higher child mortality of rural-to-urban migrants compared with urban nonmigrants, Madise, Bocquier, and Zulu compared DHS data from 18 African countries to argue that it is not necessarily the place of residence but access to services and economic opportunities that matter for child survival. They used DHS data collected from 18 African countries between 1995 and 2001 and examined the migration status of the mother and compositional effects, such as differences in socioeconomic status, sanitation, and individual child characteristics.

Comparing rural-to-urban migrants with urban natives, migrants only do worse than natives in less than one-half of the countries—therefore, the perceived disadvantage in child survival of urban migrants relative to urban natives is not universal. Those moving from rural to urban areas may be relatively wealthier or those with better access to health services than other rural inhabitants. On the other hand, children of urban dwellers who migrate to rural areas have very high mortality while in urban areas relative to other urban inhabitants, because they tend to be the poorest slum dwellers and those without access to services. Their findings confirm the view that child mortality is lower in urban areas than in rural areas, but if rural households have access to sanitation and services, and if their economic well-being improves, rural childhood mortality can decline to levels that cancel out the so-called urban advantage.

=== "Protecting female migrants from forced sex and HIV infection" (2017) ===
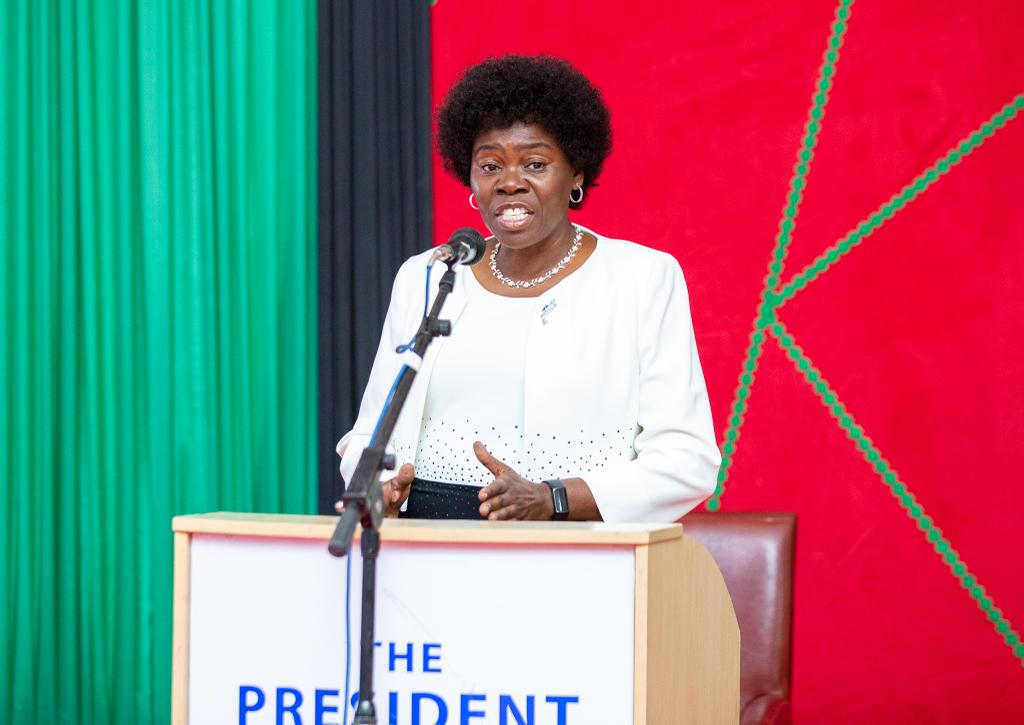
Prof Nyovani Madise in 2026

In this paper, Madise and Bernard Onyango begin by assessing the issue from a macro-level pointing out the fact that 30% of women globally have been victims of abuse perpetrated by someone that they know. This abuse has negative emotional, mental and health effects for women. Madise and Onyango cite the paper by Julie Pannetier and colleagues in The Lancet Public Health, which shows that some migrants to Europe are infected with HIV when they reach their destination. This is contrary to popular belief that many of these migrants from sub-Saharan Africa are infected with the epidemic before they arrive. The authors point out that women who migrate are usually low skilled workers fleeing home countries because of poverty and high risk of sexual violence.

A report by the UNHCR suggests that some of these women are forced to pay for their transportation and documentation to get to Europe through exchanging sexual favours. A lack of basic needs such as shelter and healthcare when arriving in Europe increases the risk of being sexually abused because they are vulnerable. The vulnerability is heightened by poverty which increases inequality and leads to a power imbalance between the rich and poor. This power imbalance will lead to a woman's depreciated view of her sense of self-worth and ultimately lead to her transactional sex. The paper concludes that since females form a significant proportion of people who migrate, there is a need for a gender-based analysis when designing migration regulations and policies.

=== "Level the playing field for science in the global South" (2020) ===
In 2020, Madise highlighted the need for scientific cooperation as it propels global development. The current COVID-19 emergency demonstrates, if more evidence were needed, how interconnected the world is and how vital it is for scientists to continue to work together across national and regional boundaries. Despite the economic, political and social impacts of the crisis, this World Science Day for Peace and Development, we should reflect on the progress made in global development as a result of scientific cooperation.

In low- and middle-income countries (LMICs), Madise says that there is a great increase in productivity and in the quality of research and innovation. These include major multi-country clinical trials and advances in health, mobile technology and data sharing, and the spread of affordable, sustainable energy technologies. This progress has been pushed forward by the Sustainable Development Goals.

== Selected works ==
- Monica Akinyi Magadi, Nyovani Janet Madise, Roberto Nascimento Rodrigues, 2000. "Frequency and timing of antenatal care in Kenya: explaining the variations between women of different communities"
- Priscilla A Akwara, Nyovani Janet Madise, Andrew Hinde, 2003. "Perception of risk of HIV/AIDS and sexual behaviour in Kenya"
- Rob Stephenson, Angela Baschieri, Steve Clements, Monique Hennink, Nyovani Madise, 2006. "Contextual influences on the use of health facilities for childbirth in Africa"
- Elizabeth W Kimani-Murage, Nyovani J Madise, Jean-Christophe Fotso, Catherine Kyobutungi, Martin K Mutua, Tabither M Gitau, Nelly Yatich, 2011." Patterns and determinants of breastfeeding and complementary feeding practices in urban informal settlements, Nairobi Kenya Authors"
- Ann M Moore, Kofi Awusabo-Asare, Nyovani Madise, Johannes John-Langba, Akwasi Kumi-Kyereme, 2007. "Coerced first sex among adolescent girls in sub-Saharan Africa: prevalence and context"
- Guy M Poppy, Sosten Chiotha, Felix Eigenbrod, Celia A Harvey, Miroslav Honzák, Malcolm D Hudson, Andy Jarvis, NJ Madise, Kate Schreckenberg, CM Shackleton, F Villa, Terence P Dawson, 2014. "Food security in a perfect storm: using the ecosystem services framework to increase understanding"
