= Digital violence =

Digital violence can refer to:

- violence in computer games
- disruptive actions online, such as cyber-bullying or cyberwarfare
