= Malawi Enterprise Development Fund =

Malawian institution

The Malawi Enterprise Development Fund in Usisya in 2026

The Malawi Enterprise Development Fund is both the revamped and the former name of what was once called the National Economic Empowerment Fund Limited (NEEF), In 2026 it was rebranded again as the Malawi Enterprise Development Fund.

== History ==
The institution is located in Lilongwe, Malawi and it is a Malawian government owned Microfinance Institution who intend to economically empower people in rural and urban areas, (particularly women, girls and people with disabilities), by providing quality, affordable and sustainable microfinance services for better health.

In 2020 the government rebranded the Malawi Enterprise Development Fund (MEDF) scheme as the National Economic Empowerment Fund Limited (NEEF). In May 2021, NEEF gave K5.56 billion in cash to various women and youths groups.

In 2026 it was rebranded again as the Malawi Enterprise Development Fund.
