= Flossie Gomile-Chidyaonga =

Deputy High Commissioner of Malawi

- Died: 9 May 2014
- Education: graduate of Polytechnic in Malawi
- Occupations: the Deputy High Commissioner of Malawi to Britain and Tanzania

Flossy Gomile-Chidyaonga in 2013

Flossy Gomile-Chidyaonga (died 9 May 2014) was the Deputy High Commissioner of Malawi to Britain and Tanzania. She was involved in a diplomatic spat between Malawi and the United Kingdom in 2011 due to a leaked diplomatic cable, and was expelled. She was the Malawian High Commissioner to Tanzania.

== Personal life ==
Chidyaonga was a graduate of Polytechnic in Malawi. She died after a short illness on 9 May 2014.

== Career ==
She was a lecturer at the University of Malawi. She was a member of the Professional Women's Association and spoke at the "Changing World Conference" in 1997 on their behalf about building transnational relations. She served as Acting Ambassador to the British High Commission. She then became the High Commissioner to Tanzania.

=== Malawi-Tanzania Border Dispute ===
She was the High Commissioner in Malawi during the Malawi-Tanzania water dispute over Lake Malawi and Lake Nyasa.

=== Cochrane-Dyet Cable ===
In a Wiki-Leaked cable to England, British High Commissioner to Malawi Fergus Cochrane-Dyet referred to Malawi's President Bingu wa Mutharika as arrogant, and "ever more autocratic and intolerant of criticism.". This was printed in the Malawian newspaper, The Nation. This led to wa Mutharika's expulsion of the envoy, and a request for a replacement. In retaliation, the British government expelled Gomile-Chidyaonga, who was the Acting High Commissioner for Malawi in Britain at the time. They also revoked her invitation to the royal wedding of Prince William and Catherine Middleton.
