= Malawi Government Gazette =

Government gazette of Malawi

The Malawi Government Gazette is the government gazette of Malawi.

The Gazette has been published since independence from Britain in July 1964. Copies up to 1988 may be found in the collections of the British Library.
