= Violet Banda =

Malawian activist

- Born: 1991 or 1992; Malawi
- Occupation(s): Reporter, children's rights activist
- Employer: Radio Timveni
- Known for: Advocacy for children's rights, HIV/AIDS awareness
- Notable work: Weekly radio program highlighting child abuse, HIV/AIDS awareness

Violet Banda (born 1991 or 1992) is a reporter and children's rights activist from Malawi. Through her weekly radio appearances, she has drawn the attention of the Malawian public and government to the problems affecting children in her country, including abuse, rape, forced marriage, and discrimination based on HIV status.

== Early life ==
Banda was born with HIV. Both of her parents had the virus and died from it. Her mother died when Banda was three. She found out that herself was HIV positive when she was 14. "When I found out I was positive, I was in primary school," Banda has said. "Whenever I would tell people about my status it happened that I lost all my friends. Some didn't want to be near me or touch me. They just ran away." This treatment made it difficult for her to perform in school.

== Activism ==
Banda first spoke openly about her infection in a 2006 interview on Radio Timveni, a weekly half-hour radio program in Malawi devoted to children's issues. Phillip Kamwendo, program manager at Timveni, has said that Banda's grandmother could not accept Banda's HIV status "until she came on our radio program." When Banda, then age 14, "told her story and how she feels," her grandmother was tuned in, and the testimony "changed her mindset towards her granddaughter." "Banda personifies the power of radio in Malawi," stated Speak Magazine. Since first opening up about her infection, Banda has called for further education on the spread of infections like HIV, as a preventative measure to curb future cases of the disease.

After the interview, the program hired her as a youth reporter. Her job is to uncover cases of violence against children and interview them about their own stories about rape, abuse, and forced marriages. Radio Timveni was founded by Plan Malawi and since 2011 has been independently operated with funding from Plan Malawi and Plan Sweden.

She spoke at the Oslo Freedom Forum in May 2011. At age 19, she was the youngest speaker thus far in the history of that annual event. In her talk, entitled "Giving Voice to Malawi's Youth," she talked about problems faced by children in Malawi, including rape by family members, abuse by teachers, and forced marriages. She discussed one of the children she had interviewed on radio, a girl who contracted AIDS after being raped by her uncle when she was 11 years old. She also noted that some of her programs had spurred government action, succeeding, for example, in getting abusive teachers fired.

In July 2014, she spoke at the 20th International AIDS Conference in Melbourne, Australia. "I was born with HIV and have experienced stigma all my life," she said. "Discrimination and the shame of living with HIV must come to an end. This conference marks a new beginning in my life and I hope it is the same with all of you."
