= Maravi Post =

Malawian news website

- Website type: Online newspaper
- Available in: English
- Website: Maravi Post
- Launched: 2009
- Current status: Active

The Maravi Post is a Malawi news, online-only news website. The publication is one of the online-only news websites about Malawi that include Nyasa Times, Malawi 24 and the Malawi Voice.

== History ==
Maravi Post was started in 2009 and it has had about 20 employees. The publication is one of the online-only news websites in Malawi that include Nyasa Times and Malawi 24 The news outlet is recognised by the United Nations Economic Commission for Africa and Stanford University.

In February 2023, Dorica Mtenje, who was a Maravi Post journalists was arrested and held for several hours. The Committee to Protect Journalists protested the arrest because it interfered with press freedom. Moreover, they noted that Mtenje did not write the offending article which involved the alleged defamation of the National Intelligence Service Director General Dokani Ngwira. The authorities believed that although there was no evidence, they suspected that Dorica Mtenje and her boss, Lloyd M’bwana, had written the article.

== Status ==
The Maravi Post has offices in Lilongwe, but its headquarters are said to be in Atlanta, Georgia, United States. It says it is not associated with any political party, but its rival, Nyasa Times, described it as "pro-government" in 2017 when the Post named "Prophet" Shepherd Bushiri as its ‘Personality of the Year.
