= Emily Mkamanga =

Malawian writer and social commentator (1949–2021)

- Born: 27 December 1949; Chilumba, Nyasaland
- Died: 28 November 2021 (aged 71); Mzuzu, Malawi
- Education: University of Malawi
- Occupations: Writer, social commentator
- Writing career
- Language: English

Emily Lilly Mkamanga (27 December 1949 – 28 November 2021) was a Malawian writer and social commentator. She was one of the few well-known female writers in Malawi.

== Early life ==
Emily Lilly Mkamanga was born in Chilumba, Nyasaland, on 27 December 1949. She was educated at Livingstonia, Uliwa, Lilongwe Girls' Secondary School and the University of Malawi, where she studied in the Bunda College of Agriculture and graduated in 1971.

== Career ==
After working at Chitedze Agricultural Research Station, she spent fifteen years as an Agricultural Information Officer at the National Bank. While still there, in 1990 she published The Night Stop, a novel about "the long-suffering wife of a promiscuous lawyer".

Mkamanga's retirement from the bank in 1993 coincided with the end of Dr. Hastings Banda's 30 years in power. In 2000, her account of those years was published by John Lwanda's publishing firm Dudu Nsomba. Titled Suffering in Silence: Malawi women's thirty year dance with Dr Banda, the book has been described as "an analysis of the obsessive psyche of a modern tyrant" and a "polemic" that becomes "a form of prosecution of Banda". The word "dance" in the title refers to the women's dancing arranged at political rallies praising Dr. Banda. While the dancing had once been associated with female activists, it came to be required of all women and controlled through the Malawi Congress Party leadership. Mkamanga said women were coerced and exploited to satisfy the ruling dictator, even though he presented himself as a guardian to women: as a nkhoswe, meaning an authoritative uncle or brother in Malawian matrilineal cultures. Many people in Malawi would describe the dancing as a traditional part of their culture, an idea promoted by Banda, while Mkamanga considered that women in Malawi are generally guided by "patriarchal traditions and cultural norms". In the same year that Suffering in Silence appeared she also co-authored Road to Democracy: role of the media in the 2000 Malawi local government elections: final report.

Mkamanga was a regular columnist for the Nyasa Times, and also wrote political and social opinion pieces elsewhere. She has been called a "social historian" as well as commentator or journalist. In 2013, the president of the Malawi Writers Union described her as one of the only three "known" women writers in the country, the others were Walije Gondwe and Janet Karim.

Mkamanga served on the boards of various institutions, including ActionAid in Malawi, the Media Council of Malawi, the Journalists Union of Malawi, Youth and Society, and the Institute for Investigative Journalism.

== Death ==
Emily Mkamanga died on 28 November 2021 at the age of 71 in Wezi Medical Centre in Mzuzu.

== See also ==
- List of Malawian writers
