= Martha Chikuni =

Malawian journalist and diplomat (1974–2021)

- Born: Martha Chikuni; January 25, 1974; Lilongwe, Malawi
- Died: July 9, 2021 (aged 47)
- Occupations: Public Relations Officer, journalist, diplomat

Martha Thokozani Chikuni (January 25, 1974 – July 9, 2021) was a Malawian journalist, television personality and diplomat. She was one of the first women news anchors at Television Malawi. She served as the head of media marketing at the State Residence during the administration of Malawian President Lazarus Chakwera and as special assistant to President Joyce Banda. She was a former diplomat to the Malawian mission to the United States in Washington D.C., responsible for trade and tourism marketing.

== Career ==
Chikuni started her career at Television Malawi (TVM) in 1994, working as one of the first news anchors. As a news presenter, she was a part of the UDF Media Task force in 1999. After leaving TVM, she worked as diplomat in Malawi's mission to the United States in Washington D.C. for several years as the Second Secretary responsible for trade and tourism. She actively entered politics thereafter, serving as head of marketing at the State house and special assistant in Joyce Banda's administration where she was a vocal advocate of the People's Party. Chikuni fought against the oppression of the DPP party whose administration heavily cracked down on journalists and media. She was appointed head of media marketing under the Tonse Alliance administration of President Lazarus Chakwera in 2020. She was also the marketing manager for her family's business.

In March 2021 she was organising a campaign of COVID-19 awareness involving the President and celebrities including singer Tay Grin and poet Q Malewezi. The video was to supply hope and reassure creatives in the country.

== Personal life ==
Chikuni died on July 9, 2021. The details surrounding her death remain unknown. Chikuni was from Bvumbwe in Thyolo. She was the daughter of former Malawian Ambassador to the United States and South Africa, Lucious Chikuni and former People's Party Deputy Secretary General Irene Chikuni.
