= Rex Chikoko =

Malawian journalist, communication consultant and media analyst

- Born: Rex Chikoko; 17 March 1975 (age 51); Malawi.
- Occupation: Journalist
- Spouse: Maria Chikoko
- Children: Christien Wathu, Chikhulupiliro Jotham, Zemira Wendy

Rex Chikoko is a Malawian investigative journalist, media analyst, and communications consultant. His work focuses particularly on illicit finance, money laundering, governmental corruption, and the accountability of public institutions.is a Malawian investigative journalist, media consultant, corporate communication specialist, and media analyst and trainer.

He is currently the Director of News and Current Affairs at Malawi Broadcasting Corporation. Previously, he worked as Public Relations and Communications Manager for the government-owned National Oil Company of Malawi. He was the Editor at Times Group Limited responsible for The Daily Times, Malawi News and The Sunday Times.

He is known for his work at Nation Publications Limited and the Thomson Reuters Foundation. He is known for his coverage of illicit transfers of money and money laundering. His coverage of the 2013 cashgate scandals involving Malawian government financial irregularities and fraud was widely published. He was also known for uncovering a story in which the Malawi government’s deal with a Brazilian mining company, Vale for the construction of a railway was unproductive for Malawi.

He is also known for his television and radio commentary on current affairs, which was regularly featured on Times Television and Times Radio. He also hosted a television programme, The Constitution.

== Background ==
A graduate in Journalism and Mass Communication, he also holds numerous professional certificates in media management and investigative journalism from reputable institutions. He attended an Illicit Finance Journalism Program at City University London. He was affiliated with the Mail and Guardian Centre for Investigative Journalism (MGCIJ) in Johannesburg. He developed an interest in investigative journalism after attending training workshops in Malawi and South Africa. He served as Chairperson of the Association for Journalists Against HIV/AIDS.

== Awards ==
In 2016, Chikoko won Misa-Malawi's Business and Economics Journalist of the Year-Print award. In 2018, Chikoko won Misa-Malawi's Democracy and Good Governance Journalist of the year-Print award.
