= National Archives of Malawi =

National archive of Malawi
- Formation: 1967
- Headquarters: Nyasaland
- Mr: Paul Lihoma

The National Archives of Malawi is a government department in the Ministry of Local Government, Unity and Culture.

== History ==
It was established in Zomba in July 1947 as a Regional Branch of the then Central African Archives. Later in 1953 after the formation of the Federation of Rhodesia and Nyasaland, it became a branch of the National Archives of Rhodesia and Nyasaland. The responsibility of this branch was to be the official repository of public records as well as records belonging to private institutions and individuals who had connections with the territorial activities as well as the legal deposit library of all literature relating to the area. The Federation ended in December 1963 and in January 1964, the Nyasaland branch became the National Archives of Malawi.

The National Archives of Malawi derives its mandate from two statutes:

- The Printed Publications Act 19:01 that provides for the registration of newspapers, the printing and publication of books and the preservation of printed works in Malawi.
- the National Archives Act 28:01 which provides for the classification, conservation, custody, control, acquisition and disposal of certain public, judicial, historical and general records.

In October 2010, during the Bingu wa Mutharika government, the Weekend Times tabloid was banned under the 1958 Printed Publications Act, a colonial-era law requiring periodicals to register with the Archives and to give the archives a copy of each edition.The ban was criticized domestically and internationally; other papers in the country operating without registration had not been banned and, according to The Zimbabwean, the BNL had already submitted paperwork to register the paper with the archives. The managing director of the Times said that they had only learnt of the ban from radio reports and had already printed the next edition. Those opposed to the ban perceived it as an attempt to suppress the paper's reporting rather than a genuine attempt to enforce the Printed Publications Act.

The BNL appealed the decision and the High Court granted an injunction the following November, allowing publication to continue. After negotiations with the BNL, the Ministry of Information and Civic Education, the Ministry of Justice, and the Ministry of Tourism, the BNL and the National Archives signed an agreement to have the Times registered in 2011 and the ban was lifted.

== Mission ==
The mission is to collect, organise, preserve and provide access to the country's documentary heritage, irrespective of the media, for reference, research and posterity.

== Functions ==
- Regulate the creation, classification, maintenance, and disposal of public records.
- Provide economic storage for semi-current government records.
- Preserve and conserve archival materials (public archives, historical manuscripts, printed and published works) for reference, research, socio-economic development, and posterity.
- Collect historical manuscripts and conduct oral history research to complement the official archives of the country.
- Provide a nationwide advisory service in records and archives management.
- Maintain a legal deposit library for the preservation of printed and published works on Malawi.
- Register newspapers published in Malawi as provided for under the Printed Publications Act.
- Administer the International Standard Book Numbering (ISBN) system in the country.

== Sections ==
- Public Archives.
- Legal Deposit Library
- Training and Consultancy.
- Policy and Standards.
- Repository.
- Conservation and Preservation.

== Projects ==
- Digitisation of Endangered Native Authority Records from 1891 - 1964.
- Digitisation of Audiovisual Collection.

== See also ==
- National Library Service of Malawi
- List of national archives
