= Malawi Communications Regulatory Authority =

Independent regulatory institution in Malawi

The Malawi Communications Regulatory Authority (MACRA) is the communications regulatory authority in Malawi. It was established as an independent regulatory organization in 1998 as part of the Communications Act. It oversees Malawi's Telecommunications, Broadcasting, Postal Services, and Internet. The Director General of MACRA since 2026 has been Mayamiko Nkoloma.

== History ==
MACRA is among the three institutions established after the dissolution of Malawi Posts and Telecommunications Corporation (MPTC). MACRA was under Malawi Telecommunications Limited until 1998 when it began to be the authority on communications in Malawi.

The authority organised a national competition for innovations that created social impact. The Unipod at MUBAS was involved in the development of devices that allow a computer to be controlled by someone's eye movements. The development was made by MUBAS graduate Chimwemwe Liwonde who won the competition in 2026.

== See also ==
- Mass media in Malawi
- Women in the media in Malawi
- Media Council of Malawi
- Media Institute of Southern Africa
