= Lusungu Kalanga =

Malawian feminist and gender activist

- Born: Malawi
- Education: University of Malawi; University of Sussex
- Employer: Social Development Direct
- Known for: Violence against women and girls activism, feminist movement building

Lusungu Kalanga (born in 1989) is a Malawian feminist activist, podcaster and social development specialist. Her work focuses on women's rights, girls’ education, gender-based violence (GBV) prevention and response, advocacy and influencing and African feminist movement building across the continent and beyond. She currently serves as a GBV Principal Consultant at Social Development Direct (SDDirect) and co-chair of the board of trustees at Womankind Worldwide. Lusungu was named as one of 25 outstanding young women leaders in Africa by The Moremi Initiative.

== Early life and education ==
Lusungu was born in Malawi, where her father worked in social development,she stated that following her father to development project sites exposed her to how women and girls were affected by inequality, and that it sparked her interest in activism and gender justice.

She attended University of Malawi where she got a bachelor's degree in Social Sciences majoring in Sociology and minoring in Psychology and Demography and later earned a master's degree in Development Studies (merit) at the Institute of Development Studies, University of Sussex.

== Career ==
Lusungu began her formal career with a community Based Organisation called Adziwa Orphan programme as a sponsorship coordinator working with vulnerable families; particularly widows and orphans. She went on to support the set up of Fountain Of Life office in Malawi, working to support survivors of sexual violence. She also co-founded Growing Ambitions, a young women led organisation focused on providing a safe space for girls and young women to thrive through comprehensive mentorship and peer learning. She then went on to work for ActionAid International Malawi, where she co-led a national task force that successfully advocated for the passing of the Marriage, Divorce and Family Relations Act and later for the constitutional amendment that raised Malawi's minimum age of marriage from 16 to 18. Lusungu went on to work with other organisations like World Education Inc/Bantwana and Jesuit Refugee Service. Lusungu also led the prevention and response work under the first flagship Tithetse Nkhanza programme in Malawi, working with over eight implementing partners and the Government of Malawi to shift social norms linked to GBV and strengthen national response systems. She then moved on work as GBV prevention Cluster Lead and Capacity Development Associate at The Prevention Collaborative. In 2019, Lusungu co founded Feministing While African, an online space for over 260 African feminists to be in community with each other.

Lusungu's work now focuses on providing global advisory support to governments, multilaterals, and women's rights organisations in GBV prevention and response and advocating for the prioritisation of prevention through her role as Co Lead for External Engagement and Influencing for the Global ‘What Works to Prevent Violence – Impact at Scale’ Programme.

== Board memberships ==
- Co-chair, Board of Trustees, Womankind Worldwide
- Board Secretary and co-chair, Resource Mobilisation Committee, Fòs Feminista (USA)
- Board Director (Safeguarding), Theatre for a Change, Malawi
- Strategic advisor to Eyala

== Podcasts and media ==
Lusungu is the co-creator and co-host of the Feministing While Malawian podcast, which was recognised by The Guardian as one of the best podcasts in Africa. The podcast explored feminist thought and lived experiences in Malawi and the wider African context.

She is also the creator and host of And The Women Came, a podcast that celebrates women showing up for other women and amplifies stories of solidarity, leadership, and resilience.

=== Recognition and awards ===
- Moremi Initiative Leadership (MILEAD) Fellow (2013)
- Mandela Washington Fellow (YALI) (2016)
- Chevening Scholar (UK Foreign, Commonwealth & Development Office, 2016)
- Obama Foundation Africa Leader (2019)

== Publications ==
Kalanga has authored and co-authored several practice-based learning briefs, including:

- Kalanga, Lusungu. and Kamanga, Kamanga. (2025). Working With Governments to End Violence Against Women and Children.
- Kalanga, Lusungu, and Stern, Erin.(2025). Programme Summary: Communities Care in Somalia and South Sudan. Prevention Collaborative.
- Kalanga, Lusungu and Bangura, Amanda (2021).Adapting the SASA! Together Approach: Lessons from Malawi.
- Kalanga, Lusungu (2021) Adapting a Combined Social and Economic Empowerment Model for GBV Prevention in Malawi.
- Kalanga, Lusungu and Bangura, Amanda (2021)Survivor Support Fund: Lessons Learnt and Recommendations.
