= Malawi News Agency =

Organization

The Malawi News Agency (MANA) is the national news agency of Malawi. It is overseen by the Ministry of Information. It is administered by the Director of Information and Civic Education. It is the largest news network in Malawi and has offices in all regions and districts in Malawi.

== Services ==
MANA is an information resource for and about Malawi. MANA is in charge of granting accreditation to international media in Malawi. It contributes to both government and private periodicals on a regular basis.

== History ==
It was established in 1966 to spread information from the Malawi government under the Ministry of Information. Its headquarters are in Lilongwe, Malawi. It also has offices in the regional capital cities (Lilonwe, Mzuzu, Blantyre). It has offices in all the Districts of Malawi. It established its online presence in August 2012.
