= The Daily Times (Malawi) =

Malawian daily newspaper founded in 1895

- 16 February 2026 example
- Publisher: Blantyre Newspapers Limited
- Editor: Rex Chikoko
- Founded: 1895; 131 years ago
- Language: English
- Headquarters: Blantyre, Malawi
- Sister newspapers: Malawi News (weekly, published on Saturday); Sunday Times (weekly, published on Sunday); The Weekend Times (Friday afternoon tabloid)
- Website: times.mw

The Daily Times is a daily newspaper published in Blantyre, Malawi that was founded in 1895.

== History ==
It is one of the oldest newspapers in the country, founded in 1895 as the Central African Planter. Around 1900, it was rebranded to Central African Times. It was a weekly publication and it was later renamed to be the Nyasaland Times. With the Malawi's independence in 1964, it became The Times (then published bi-weekly), and finally the Daily Times in 1972.

Archives are held by the National Archives.

== Publisher ==
The publisher is Blantyre Newspapers Limited (BNL), a subsidiary of Blantyre Printing & Publishing Company Ltd., which published four sister newspapers: The Daily Times (Monday-Friday), the defunct weekly Weekend Times (Friday afternoon), Malawi News (Saturday), and Sunday Times (Sunday).

In 2013, Blantyre Printing & Publishing Company Ltd established Malawi's Times Television (TTV).

The MISA award-winning TV station provides local content about the arts, entertainment, sports and current affairs. Times Television was available on different suppliers.

In 2015, Blantyre Printing & Publishing Company Ltd established Times Radio, a sister company of Times Television. It broadcasts nationwide, mostly in chichewa. On 29 July 2020, Times Radio had a mix up with the UK-based radio station of the same name. It was said that users of smart speakers were trying to trying to find the UK based radio station were surprised to find someone speaking chichewe. The story was recounted at the same time as the UK station was doing an interview with the then Prime Minister Boris Johnson. Blantyre Printing & Publishing Company Ltd is a 360 degree media house consisting of Times Radio Blantyre Newspapers Limited (BNL) and Times Television. The media house now called "Times 360".

== Notable contributors (past and present) ==
- Raphael Tenthani, journalist, columnist
