= The Nation (Malawi) =

Newspaper based in Blantyre, Malawi

- Type: Daily newspaper
- Format: Berliner
- Owner: Nation Publications Limited
- Editor: Ephraim Munthali
- Founded: 1993; 33 years ago
- Language: English, Chewa, Tumbuka
- Headquarters: Blantyre, Malawi
- Website: https://www.mwnation.com/

The Nation is a newspaper based in Blantyre, Malawi, owned by Nation Publications Limited. It began distribution on 26 July 1993, and became a daily newspaper on 11 July 1994, coming out on Mondays through Fridays. Its sister newspaper, Saturday Nation, now called Weekend Nation, was launched in 1995.

== The Nation Newspaper ==
The Nation began distribution in July 1993 and became a daily newspaper in 1994. It became an important voice against the one party rule and the MCP party during the transition to multi-party rule.

== The Weekend Nation ==
The Weekend Nation is a weekly newspaper based in Blantyre, Malawi, owned by Nation Publications Limited (NPL). The weekly version is The Nation. It was originally called Saturday Nation and was launched in 1995.

=== Cochrane-Dyet 2011 cable controversy ===
In April 2011, the Weekend Nation published an article quoting a leaked diplomatic telegram from British High Commissioner Fergus Cochrane-Dyet in which he wrote that Malawian President Bingu wa Mutharika was "becoming ever more autocratic and intolerant of criticism". On 27 April 2011, Malawi's government declared Cochrane-Dyet persona non grata and expelled him from the country. The UK responded by expelling Malawi's acting high commissioner, Flossie Chidyaonga. British aid to Malawi was also cut off.

In October 2011, Mutharika apologized for the expulsion of Cochrane-Dyet and lifted his ban from Malawi. By November 2011, Cochrane-Dyet had not been sent back to Malawi, and the British government had not decided whether or not to re-establish normal relations with Malawi. Relations between the two countries did not normalize until there was a change of leadership in Lilongwe, in April 2012.

== The Nation and Weekend Nation Online ==
The online version of the Daily and Weekend Nation began in 1998.

== Fuko ==
The Nation launched its Chewa language and Tumbuka language development paper online, which it distributes for free in rural areas. The paper partners with the United Nations Population Fund, Total Land Care, Malawi Rural Finance Company, and Pride Malawi.

== Nations Publications Limited ==
The Nation and Weekend Nation are publications of Nations Publication Limited (NPL), which is located in Blantyre. NPL's parent company was founded by Aleke Banda after the 1993 referendum in Malawi. It started with eight employees. This included Ken Lipenga, who served as the editor-in-chief until 1995. Its initial assets consisted of one car, two computers, and two telephones. It currently has offices in Blantyre, Lilongwe, Mzuzu, and Zomba.

Banda became the country's former agriculture minister and former vice president of the United Democratic Front (Malawi). In 2010, Mbumba Banda, Aleke Banda's daughter, became the managing director after the death of her father.

== Notable contributors ==
- Mabvuto Banda, journalist
- Rex Chikoko, investigative journalist
- Edyth Kambalame, Deputy editor
- Desmond Dudwa Phiri, columnist, economist, sociologist, writer.
