= Nyasa Times =

Malawian newspaper

- Website type: Online newspaper
- Available in: English
- Headquarters: Leeds, UK
- Owner: Edgar Chibaka
- Website: Nyasa Times
- Launched: 2006
- Current status: Active

Nyasa Times is an online newspaper providing Malawian news, founded by Edgar Chibaka in 2006.

== History ==
Nyasa Times began reporting in late 2006. According to its own website, it received "over 8 million hits per month" in 2010. Nyasa Times' founding Managing director was Edgar Chibaka.

In 2009 and adviser to Malawi's President Dr Hetherwick Ntaba said that he intended to see Nyasa Times journalists in court. In 2010 the Managing Director, Edgar Chibaka, was living in Leeds. He reported that the Malawian government were talking to the British High Commission in Lilongwe. They were said to be seeking the extradition of the newspaper's editors to face changes of sedition. He and editor Thom Chiumia said that they were applying for political asylum. Ntaba who led the Democratic Progress Party said that they were not seeking their extradition.

The publication has on numerous occasion been at loggerheads with the Bingu wa Mutharika government. They had retracted a story that the President was in a coma before an election. Mutharika accused former president Bakili Muluzi of bankrolling the online media outfit to publish false stories to tarnish the image of the government.
