= List of Malawians =

This is a list of notable people from Malawi:

== Activists ==
- Chikondi Chabvuta
- Emmie Chanika
- John Chilembwe
- Rafiq Hajat
- Zinenani Majawa
- Tapiwa Uchizi Nyasulu

== Artists ==
- Namadingo
- Felix Mnthali
- Lucius Chicco Banda*
- Frank Chipasula
- Jack Mapanje
- John Lwanda
- Shemu Joyah
- Tendai M. Shaba
- Stanley Onjezani Kenani
- Steve Chimombo
- Ricky D.
- NyaGo

== Politicians ==
- Attati Mpakati
- Bakili Muluzi
- Bingu wa Mutharika
- Bester Bisani – former MP and chairperson of Presidential Dialog Committee
- Boniface Kalindo – Malawian activist and politician
- Brown Chimphamba – VC, University of Malawi (1990s), current Ambassador to the United Nations
- Brown Mpinganjira
- Chakufwa Chihana
- David Rubadiri – VC, University of Malawi (until 2005)
- Davis Katsonga
- Dunduzu Chisiza
- Eric Chiwaya
- George Chaponda
- Gwanda Chakuamba
- Hastings Kamuzu Banda
- Mandebvu_Agness_Chatipwa
- Henry Chipembere
- John Zenas Ungapake Tembo – leader of opposition, Governor of Reserve Bank
- Joseph Tembo – musician and politician
- Joyce Banda
- Kanyama Chiume
- Krishna Savjani – Senior Counsel
- Maxwell Mkwezalamba – Minister, OAU
- Olipa Myaba Chiluba
- Patricia Nangozo Kainga
- Patricia Shanil Dzimbiri
- Yatuta Chisiza
- Zimani Kadzamira – former VC, University of Malawi

== Science and technology ==
- William Kamkwamba – inventor
- Lucy Mtilatila - meteorologist
- Rachel Sibande (born 1986) – computer scientist

== Sports persons ==
- Essau Kanyenda – Malawi's best striker
- Tamika Mkandawire – football player
- Tamandani Nsaliwa – football/soccer player

== Writers ==
- Drake Thadzi

== Businessmen and women ==
- Shepherd Bushiri
- Edgar Chibaka
- Edith Jiya

== Others ==
- Beatrice Chipeta
- Thokozani Chimbe
- Orton Chirwa
- Vera Chirwa
- Charles Domingo
- Cecilia Kadzamira
- Jane Kambalame – Ambassador to Zimbabwe
- William Kamkwamba
- Eli Njuchi
- Elliot Kamwana
- Hetherwick Ntaba
- Address Mauakowa Malata
- Allan Ngumuya
- Justin Malewezi
- Jean Munyenyembe - Accountant General
- Dorothy Nampota
- Thokozani Unyolo

== See also ==
- Outline of Malawi
