= Brown Chimphamba =

Malawian diplomat and academic

Brown Chimphamba is a Malawian academic, civil servant and diplomat. He is the former Permanent Representative to the United Nations. He was also the chairman of the commission which ran the 1993 referendum which ended the rule of Hastings Banda's Malawi Congress Party. He was also the Vice Chancellor of the University of Malawi.

== Life ==
Chimphamba studied at University College London. His thesis for his doctorate was titled, "Cyto-genetic studies in the Genus Iris". He became a Professor of biology in Malawi.

== One-party? 1993 ==
In 1993 Chimphamba chaired a commission that organised a referendum on the future of the one-party state of Malawi. The result was non-binding but 63% of those who voted said they wanted a multi-party system. This signalled the end Dr. Banda's one-party rule which had started in 1964. Chimphamba was the person who announced the result on the radio.

== Academic Freedom 2011 ==
He was head of the Academic Freedom Commission in 2011, where democratically elected President Bingu Mutharika had a standoff with the lecturers at UNIMA. This was the result of a lecturer, Dr Blessings Chinsinga being summoned by the police Inspector General Peter Mukhito for comparisons Chinsinga drew in a political science class with regards to the Tunisian uprisings in 2011 that resulted in the overthrow of President Hosni Mubarak. It led to the firing of Dr Blessings Chinsinga, Jessie Kabwila-Kapasula, Gaston Kanchedzera, Edge Kanyongoro and Franz Amin. It also led to student protests at the University of Malawi. The six-man Commission of Inquiry, headed by Prof. Brown Chimphamba, was convened by Mutharika 'to define academic freedom, investigate the cause of the stand-off and propose measures to avoid future ones'.

== Private life ==
Chimphamba's daughter Professor Belinda Chimphamba became the deputy vice-chancellor of Kamuzu University of Health Sciences in 2023.

== Sources ==
- "Opposition in Malawi Demands Ruler Yield Power". The New York Times. June 17, 1993.
