= Blessings Chinsinga =

Professor Blessings Chinsinga is a Malawian lecturer at the centre of the Malawi Academic Freedom Stand off and eventual protests. He was a Senior Lecturer in Development Administration, Public Policy Analysis and Institutions, and Development at University of Malawi's Chancellor College.

== Academic Stand-off ==
The stand off began when Dr Blessings Chinsinga, who was an associate political science professor, was interrogated by Peter Mukhito, Malawi's Inspector General of Police. In a political science lecture he had drawn comparisons between Malawi's fuel crisis and popular uprisings in Tunisia and Egypt during the Arab Spring. This comparison was reported to the police and he was eventually fired along with Jessie Kabwira-Kapasula, Garton Kamchedzera and Edge Kanyongolo.

This move received much criticism from faculty at the university including president of the Chancellor College Academic Staff Union (CCASU), Jessie Kabwila-Kapasula. It also prompted protests from the University of Malawi students, predominantly from the Chancellor College and Polytechnic campuses, who stood in solidarity with Chinsinga and CCASU in support of academic freedom. The protest led to the eventual closing of UNIMA's Chancellor College and Polytechnic.

It led to the involvement of the then Minister Education, Peter Mutharika and his brother President Bingu wa Mutharika. President Mutharika ordered the lecturers back to class.

As a condition to return to class, the academics asked for an official apology from the police chief, Peter Mukhito and assurances of respect for academic freedom. The police Inspector General Mukhito declared that academic freedom had to be balanced because this was an issue of national security. This statement was supported by Bingu wa Mutharika who encouraged him not to apologize because of a 'mere lecture'. The failure to resolve this matter and a stand off occurred between lecturers and students on one side, and the President of Malawi, Bingu wa Mutharika. The students stood in solidarity with the fired faculty which resulted in the use of teargas to disperse students and an indefinite closure of the university.

=== Commission ===
An Academic Freedom Commission to solve the academic stand off was formed headed by former chancellor and it happened Brown Chimphamba.

=== Court Case ===
The register closed the two colleges of the university under the orders of the then President, who is both the Commander-in-Chief of the Malawi Police Service and Chancellor of the University of Malawi, in defiance of a court order that the lecturers had obtained. A court order had also a court order halted the dismissal of the staff and prevented the university council from withholding salaries of the lecturers. Thus a complete lock-out of campuses of the two colleges could not be achieved. Authorities eventually ordered the indefinite closure of the two colleges.

=== Causes of Malawi Protests ===
The Academic Stand off was one of the factors that led to the July 20, 2011 nationwide protests. Civil society was demanding the reinstatement of the professor and the guarantee of academic freedom.

== Published works ==
=== Books ===
- Planting Ideas: How Agricultural Subsidies Are Working in Malawi - 2008
- Democracy, Decentralisation and Poverty Reduction in Malawi - 2007
- "The Politics of Poverty Alleviation in Malawi", Book Chapter in A Democracy of Chameleons: Politics and Culture by Harri Englund

=== Essays ===
- Exploring the Politics of Land Reforms in Malawi: A Case Study of the Community Based Rural Land Development Programme (CBRLDP)- 2008
- District Assemblies in a fix: the perils of the politics of capacity in the political and administrative reforms in Malawi - 2005
