= Eric Mabedi =

Malawian comedian (1965–2021)

- Born: 8 February 1965
- Origin: Blantyre, Malawi
- Died: 2 August 2021 (aged 56)
- Occupation: Comedian; Businessman
- Years active: 1995–2021

Eric Mabedi (8 February 1965 – 2 August 2021) was a Malawian comedian and actor better known by his stage name as Jakobo. He gained national recognition after associating with Kwathu Drama Group in which he was in the part of the duo ‘Izeki ndi Jacobo’. He died on Monday, 2 August 2021, at Mwaiwathu Private Hospital in Blantyre due to COVID-19. He partnered with John Nyanga in Izeki ndi Jakobo plays. He came from Thumbwe village in Chiradzulu district. He was also associated with Bon Kalindo who is popularly known as Winiko.
