= Mary Chilima =

Malawian banker, entrepreneur and philanthropist, second Lady of Malawi

- Born: 3 November 1980 (age 45); Zingwangwa, Blantyre
- Occupation: Public figure
- Known for: Second Lady of Malawi
- Spouse: Saulos Chilima

Mary Nkhamanyachi Chilima (born 3 November 1980) is a Malawian banker, entrepreneur and philanthropist. She was the second Lady of Malawi and the widow of Saulos Chilima

== Life ==
Chilima was born in 1980 in the southern area of Blantyre called Zingwangwa. She and her younger brother were brought up by her mother, Margaret Kamoto, after her parents separated. She was educated at Blantyre's Our Lady of Wisdom Secondary School before studying Business administration at what was then called the University of Malawi's Polytechnic.

Chilima went to work for banks in Malawi. She then completed her first master's degree in the UK at the University of Derby.

She married Saulos Chilima and when he became the vice-president under Peter Mutharika she was known as the second lady of Malawi. All went well until they fell out with her husband complaining that corruption was not being dealt with. The President could not sack him, but he refused to work with him. In time, she and Saulos, had two children. Saulus then teamed up with Lazarus Chakwera and he became vice-president again.

On 10 June 2024 her husband was aboard a Dornier 228 aircraft when it crashed in the Chikangawa Forest Reserve. He and eight others were killed.

The accident was the subject of an Commission of Inquiry. Malawians remained unsatisfied and urged accountability for continued loss of key personnel.

Chilima founded the Children First Trust. She shows support for reducing child marriages, supporting orphans and online harassment. In 2021 she visited Temwani Chilenga to support her work.

She became the patron of the Visually and Hearing Impaired Association of Malawi charity.

She is an ambassador for Ending Online Harassment and Cyber Bullying for Plan International Malawi.Thokozani Unyolo's appointment to lead Malawi Airways gained her support.

In November 2025, as Leader of Parliament for the UTM, Patricia Kaliati called on the Minister of Homeland Security Peter Mukhito to launch a fresh investigation into the crash that killed her husband. Kaliati spoke out in defence of Chilima who had attracted comment about her mourning.
