= Vera Kamtukule =

Malawian writer, activist and politician

Honorable Vera Kamtukule
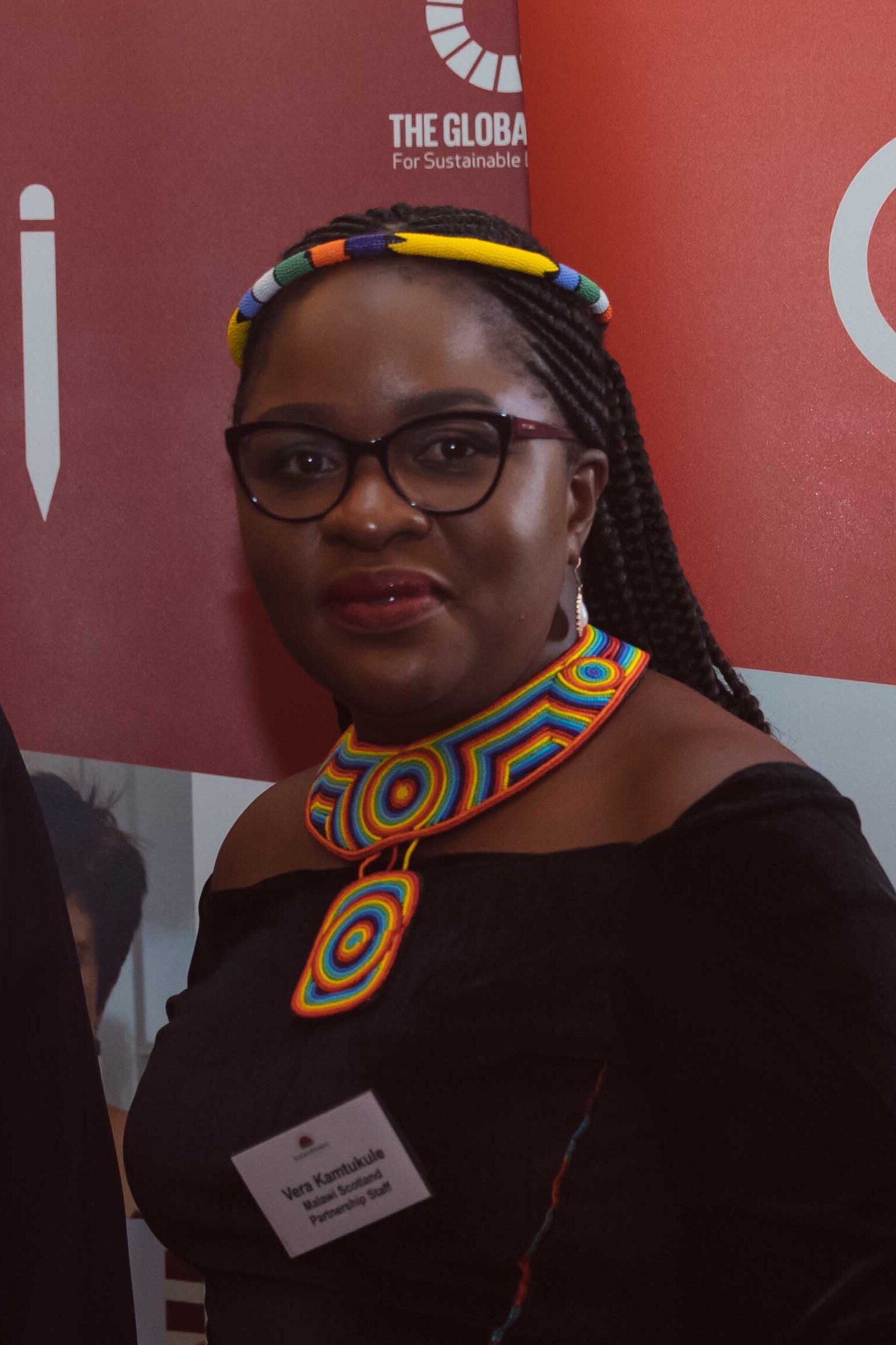
- as Chief Executive Officer of Malawi Scotland Partnership
- Born: 31 December 1981 (age 44)
- Occupation: Former Minister of Tourism
- Years active: 2023–2025
- Organization: Malawi Government
- Spouse: Edson Kamtukule
- Website: verakamtukulewrites.com

Vera Kamtukule is a Malawian author, activist and politician, who held a ministerial position in the Cabinet of Malawi. Kamtukule was appointed Minister of Tourism on 31 January 2023. Before that, Vera served as the Minister of Labour since 26 January 2022 and as deputy Minister of Labour following the 2020 Malawian presidential election. In 2021 Vera Kamtukule assumed her role as Chair of the SADC Employment and Labour Sector.

== Early life and education ==
Kamtukule was born on 31 December 1981 in Blantyre and when she was seven she moved to the township of Zingwangwa. She studied at Zingwangwa Secondary School, and from there she went to study for her bachelor's degree at the University of Malawi, Chancellor College.

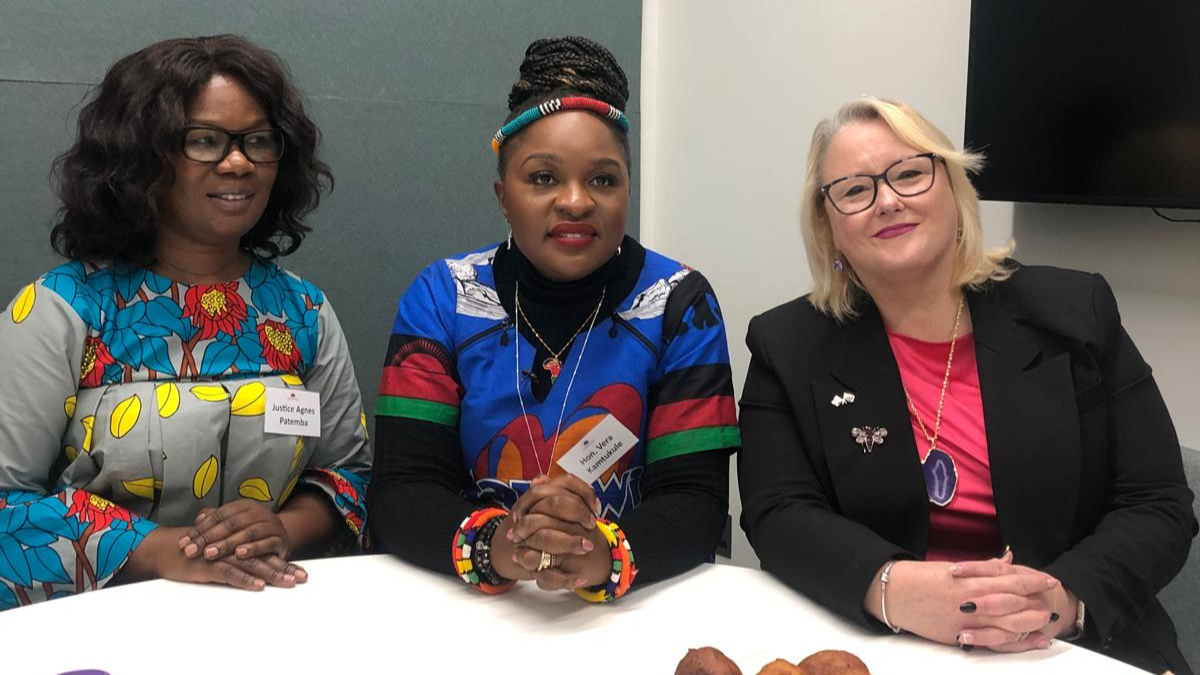
(L-R) Justice Agnes Patemba, Kamtukule and Christina McKelvie MSP at the Scotland Malawi Partnership meeting in 2023

She later on went to study for her Master of Science Degree in Strategic Management at the University of Derby, UK. Kamtukule holds a diploma in marketing and a post graduate diploma in land management. She studied for a PhD in Transformative Community Development at the Mzuzu University.

She was the chief executive officer for the Malawi Scotland Partnership In 2017 she returned to Zingwangwa where she spent a night to raise funds for the health centre. She confessed that as a child she had been scolded by her parents when they found out that she had tricked the staff there into giving her porridge that had been intended for the malnourished.

Kamtukule used to lead the Malawi Scotland Partnership (MaSP) as its CEO. Vera was named Minister of Labor on January 26, 2022, following President Dr. Lazarus Chakwera's dissolution of his cabinet, despite not being a member of parliament. She was the youngest woman in the cabinet and was a Deputy Minister in the same Ministry from 8 July 2020.

Kamtukele unveiled a new Tourism Act 2025 in April. It created a Malawi Tourism Authority and the Malawi College of Tourism and it was said to be largest change since 1968.

== Publications ==
In 2013 Kamtukule wrote a book titled "The Supply and Demand of Housing in Malawi" which was published by Lambert Academic Publishing. In 2020 one of her books Made to Bloom won the African Authors Award. Kamtukule has since published other five books, More Than A Pastor's Wife, The Professional Woman, The Absalomic Loss, 41 Things That Destroy Good Women and 29 Things that Destroy Good Men.

== Personal life ==
Vera Kamtukule is married to Edson Kamtukule, together they have two daughters.
