= Loti Dzonzi =

Loti Dzonzi is Malawi's former Inspector General of Police in Malawi. He was born in Ntchisi District Malawi. He was the former Police Commissioner prior to this appointment. He has been in the police force since 1987. His appointment was the first replacement under President Joyce Banda administration, therefore succeeding Peter Mukhito. He has vowed to stamp out corruption within the Malawi Police Service. The deputies appointed a few days later serving under him are deputies Finely Binali and Doreen Kapanga.

== Personal life ==
He is also a Deacon in the CCAP church. He attended the Police College and is a holder of a Bachelor of Arts degrees and a Masters of Business Administration Degree

Political offices
Preceded by Peter Mukhito	Inspector Generals of Malawi	Succeeded by R. P. Kanyama
