= Elizabeth Molyneux =

Elizabeth Molyneaux OBE born Elizabeth Neech became a Distinguished Professor of Paediatrics and she was the head of that department at the College of Medicine in Blantyre, Malawi.

== Life ==
Molyneux met her husband, Malcolm, in London. He had been born in Africa and he was completing his training. They married in 1969. They went to Malawi in 1974 and she and her husband were based first in a mission hospital. They did return to Liverpool for eleven years but they were basically in Malawi for the rest of their careers.

She created the emergency unit at the Queen Elizabeth Central Hospital. Molyneux began the palliative care service which was said to be the first in Africa for children. She recommends doing simple things. She is a co-founder of the World Health Organisation's Advanced Paediatric Life Support course and it's ETAT (Emergency Triage Assessment and Treatment).

Molyneux became a Distinguished Professor of Paediatrics and she was the head of department at the College of Medicine in Blantyre, Malawi.

She was awarded an OBE in 2007 and her husband also got one. In 2015 she was awarded an honorary degree by Newcastle University with several others including Nobel Laureate Paul Nurse and musician Bryan Ferry. She is an advisor to the Royal College of Paediatrics and Child Health. Her husband died in 2021.

In August 2026 following the death of Robin Broadhead, Alder Hey Hospital signed a memorandum of understanding with the Department of Paediatrics and Child Health at Kamuzu University of Health Sciences to record their future intentions. It was noted that this valuable collaboration built on the work of Broadhead and Molyneux.
