= Macpherson Mallewa =

Malawian academic

- Prof Mac Mallewa (by Jeremy Bagg)
- Known for: vice-chancellor in 2022 of the Kamuzu University of Health Sciences

Professor Macpherson "Mac" Mallewa became the vice-chancellor in 2022 of the Kamuzu University of Health Sciences.

== Life ==
He studied under Robin Broadhead who was the College of Medicine's Principal. Mallewa graduated from the University of Malawi’s College of Medicine before he went to the UK to work at Alder Hey Hospital in Liverpool where he was trained in Paediatrics and Paediatric Neurology. He took his doctorate under Tom Solomon in Tropical Medicine at the University of Liverpool graduating in 2009.

In 2022 he was appointed to be the first vice-chancellor of Kamuzu University of Health Sciences which had been created in 2019. The chancellor of the university was the President of Malawi. In 2023 President Dr Lazerus Chakwera appointed Belinda Gombachika as the deputy-vice-chancellor.

Mallewa became a consultant Paediatric Neurologist and Associate Professor in the department of Paediatrics and Child Health.

In 2026 he was among a group of vice-chancellors challenged by Minister Bright Msaka to improve the number of foreign students. Malawi needed foreign exchange and these students would be a good source.
