= Merlyne Yolamu =

Inspector General of Police in Malawi

Inspector General of Police
- In office 2022–2025
- Appointed by: Lazarus Chakwera
- President: Lazarus Chakwera
- Preceded by: George Kainja
- Succeeded by: Richard Luhanga

Personal details
- Occupation: Police officer
- Profession: Law enforcement

Merlyne Yolamu is a Malawian police officer and public servant who was the Inspector General of Police of the Malawi Police Service. She was appointed in 2022 and served to 2025.

== Life ==
Yolamu became the Inspector General of Police when she was promoted in 2022 from deputy inspector. The President Lazurus Chakwera named her in July and parliament confirmed her appointment in August 2022. She replaced George Kainja who had been sacked following allegations of corruption weeks before involving businessperson Zuneth Sattar. She was able to report in September 2022 that the number of crimes reported had fallen from 22,000 to 20,000 although the rates of mob justice, rape and homicide was a concern. The police force wanted 30,000 officers but it had 14,000. This was one officer per 1,378 people.

In 2024 she bought motorcycles to assist police officers in rural areas.

She created six regional centres and a national Police Incident Command Centre to oversee the 2025 Malawian general election. She was assisted by the United Nations Development Programme who supplied equipment.

In October 2025, President Peter Mutharika appointed Richard Luhanga as the new Inspector General of Police.
