= John Nyanga =

Malawian comedian

- Born: 13 May 1963
- Origin: Blantyre, Malawi
- Died: 23 May 2016 (aged 53); Blantyre, Malawi
- Occupation: Comedian; Businessman
- Years active: 1998–2021

John Nyanga (13 May 1963 - 23 May 2016) was a Malawian comedian and actor better known by his stage name as Izeki. He rose to fame after associating with Kwathu Drama Group in which he was in the part of the duo ‘Izeki ndi Jacobo’. He was also a pastor at Synagogue of Hope Church in Blantyre. He died in 2016 on Sunday at Queen Elizabeth Central Hospital (QECH) in Blantyre after a long illness. He partnered with Eric Mabedi in Izeki ndi Jakobo plays.
