= Richard Luhanga =

Inspector General of Police in Malawi

Richard Chikoko Luhanga

Inspector General of Police
- Incumbent
- Assumed office October 2025
- Appointed by: Peter Mutharika
- President: Peter Mutharika
- Preceded by: Merlyne Yolamu

Personal details
- Occupation: Police officer
- Profession: Law enforcement

Richard Chikoko Luhanga is a Malawian police officer and public servant who serves as the Inspector General of Police of the Malawi Police Service. He was appointed in October 2025 by President Peter Mutharika.

== Life ==
Luhanga was born in Bolero, Rumphi District, Northern Malawi. He is Tumbuka by tribe. Before his appointment as Inspector General, he was the Northern Region Commissioner of Police.

In October 2025, President Peter Mutharika appointed Luhanga as the new Inspector General of Police. He replaced Merlyne Yolamu, who had been a female Inspector General of Police appointed in 2022.

In March 2025, while serving as Northern Region Commissioner, Luhanga was arrested by the Anti-Corruption Bureau (ACB) on allegations of abuse of office. He had allegedly diverted public paint to use it on his house. He was granted bail. and appointed to a new position based on a presumption of innocence. He pledged to rebuild public trust and improve coordination with the Malawi Defence Force.
