= Thokozani Chimbe =

Malawian lawyer and cyber crime expert

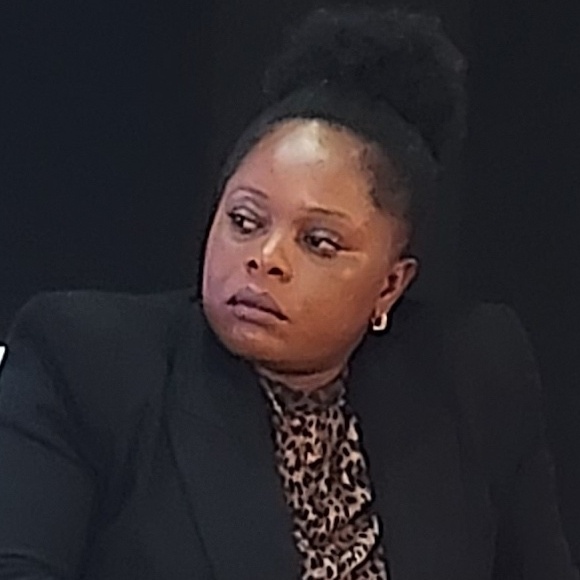
- Education: University of Malawi; International Law Institute in Uganda; Queen Mary, University of London
- Occupations: lawyer and civil servant
- Years active: 2004-
- Employer: Malawi Communications Regulatory Authority

Thokozani Chimbe is a Malawian lawyer and cybersecurity expert, and the new architect of Malawi's cybersecurity legal framework. She is Director of Legal Services at the Malawi Communications Regulatory Authority (MACRA).

== Education ==
Chimbe earned a Bachelor of Laws from the University of Malawi. She went on to gain a postgraduate diploma in legislative drafting from the International Law Institute in Uganda, and a master's degree in computer and communications law from Queen Mary, University of London.

== Career ==
Chimbe started working with MACRA in 2004.

In 2023 Chimbe chaired the organizing committee for Women and Girls in Cyber, a conference encouraging women and girls to participate in digital technology security. In 2024 she helped run MACRA training on Malawi's new Data Protection Act. At an August 2024 MACRA open day she announced that a cyber crimes bill had been drafted, and was almost ready to be tabled and passed in the upcoming parliamentary session.

She is a member of the Malawi Law Society, the Women Lawyers Association of Malawi, International Lawyers for Africa (ILFA) and the Cybersecurity Advisors Network (CyAN).
