= Zingwangwa =

District in Malawi

- Location in Malawi
- Coordinates: 15°49′7″S 35°0′55″E
- Country: Malawi
- Region: Southern Region
- District: Blantyre District
- Time zone: UTC+2

Zingwangwa is a settlement within the Malawian city of Blantyre.

== Description ==
Zingwangwa has several schools, a secondary school and a health centre.

In 2007, following a visit two years earlier by a volunteer nurse from Scotland, a partnership was established between ten health centres in Malawi and one in Dundee. A three-year grant from the International Development Fund supported the initiative, including funding for a staff member in each country.

In 2017, future government minister, Vera Kamtukule, then the CEO of the Malawi Scotland Partnership, returned to Zingwangwa where she raised funds for the health centre. The health centre did not always have permanent staff and it served over 120,000 people. Patients can face a walk of two to three hours to attend the clinic.

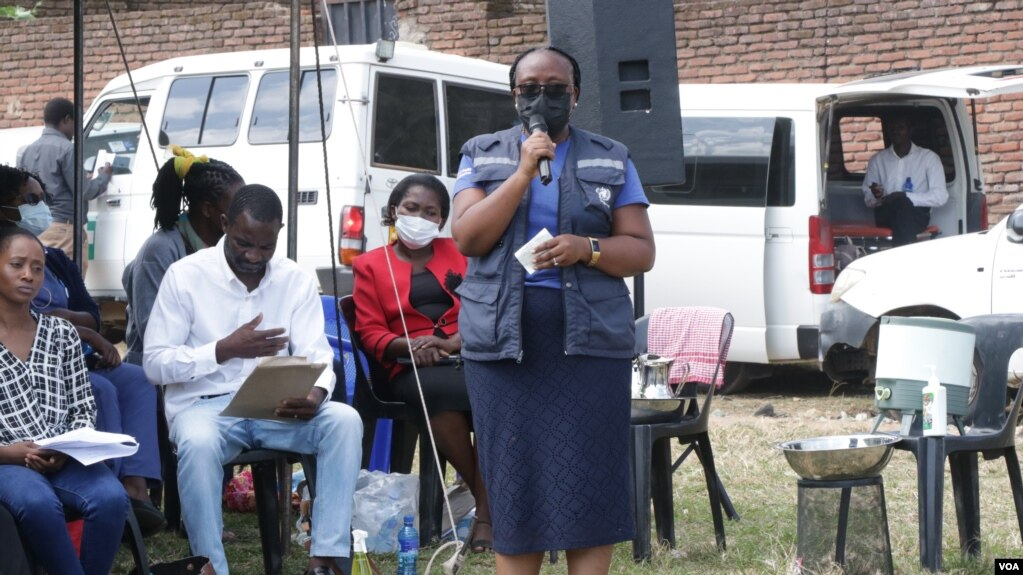
WHO representative Dr. Gertrude Chapotera speaking during the launch of cholera vaccination campaign in Zingwangwa township in 2022

In 2022, there was an outbreak of cholera and as a precaution, the World Health Authority in collaboration with the government decided to vaccinate millions. Injections took place in Zingwangwe.

In 2025, the Democratic Progressive Party won the national election and a key campaign promise had been free secondary education. Investigations in January 2026 revealed that although there were real challenges both money and new students had arrived at Zingwangwa Secondary School.

The MP from 2025 for Soche Zingwangwa was Fredokiss Kalua.

== Notable residents ==
- Mary Chilima, second lady, was born here in 1980.
- Vera Kamtukule, Minister of Tourism, was born in 1981 in Blantyre and she moved to Zingwangwa when she was seven.
