= Tonthoza Uganja =

Dr Tonthoza Uganja
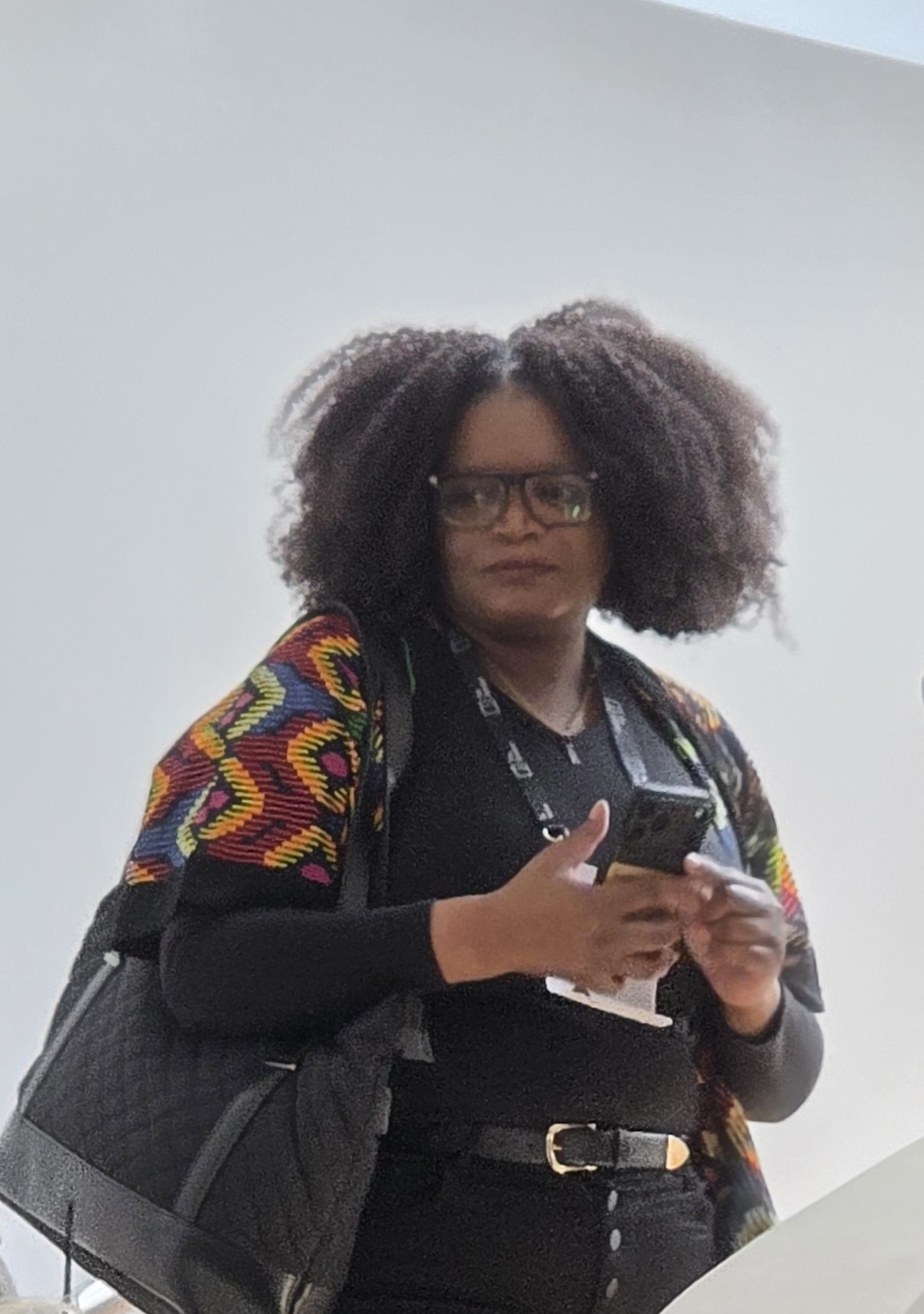
- Other name: Tontho
- Education: Bangor University (PhD) Bangor University (MSc) Mzuzu University (BSc)
- Occupation: Agroforestry expert
- Employer: Bangor University
- Organization: Sustainable Farming Solutions
- Website: https://www.sfsmw.org/

Tonthoza "Tontho" Uganja is a Malawian ecopreneur, agroforestry expert and environmental researcher. She is the founder and chief executive officer of Sustainable Farming Solutions (SFS), a social enterprise that combines restoration science and nature-based carbon finance to combat land degradation in Malawi. Uganja also serves as a lecturer in Forestry at the School of Environmental & Natural Sciences, Bangor University.

== Early life and education ==
Uganja pursued her undergraduate education at Mzuzu University and graduated with a Bachelor of Science (BSc) degree in forestry. Uganja went on to attend Bangor University in Wales, where she completed a Master of Science (MSc) in Tropical Forestry; she was awarded the Peter Henry Award for the Best Dissertation in Tropical Drylands. She later returned to Bangor University to pursue a PhD focused on monitoring forestry landscape restoration interventions. Uganja has since published some of her doctoral research; she coauthored an article that assessed three global land-cover datasets for monitoring forest restoration in Malawi, finding that Esri was the most accurate but that global datasets should be combined with national inventories and community-based data for reliable monitoring.

Uganja founded Sustainable Farming Solutions (SFS) in 2019. SFS is a Malawian farmer-first organisation that uses agroforestry and restoration to improve smallholder livelihoods. She leads land restoration across degraded landscapes with strong monitoring, transparent benefit sharing and a focus on women's leadership. Uganja is also co-developing Smart-Tree, a digital monitoring and traceability platform that supports credible reporting and fairer access to nature-based finance for farmers.

== Awards and fellowships ==
Uganja's contributions to sustainable food systems and landscape restoration have earned her international recognition:

- 2026 African Visionary Fellow, Segal Family Foundation
- 2025 Henry Arnhold Fellow, Mulago Foundation
- Schlumberger Faculty for the Future Fellow: Awarded to support her doctoral scientific research
- 2024 AGRA's Value4Her Rising Star Award for Southern Africa
- 2026 Schlumberger Foundation Impact Prize Winner.
