= Temwani Chilenga =

Malawian Teacher

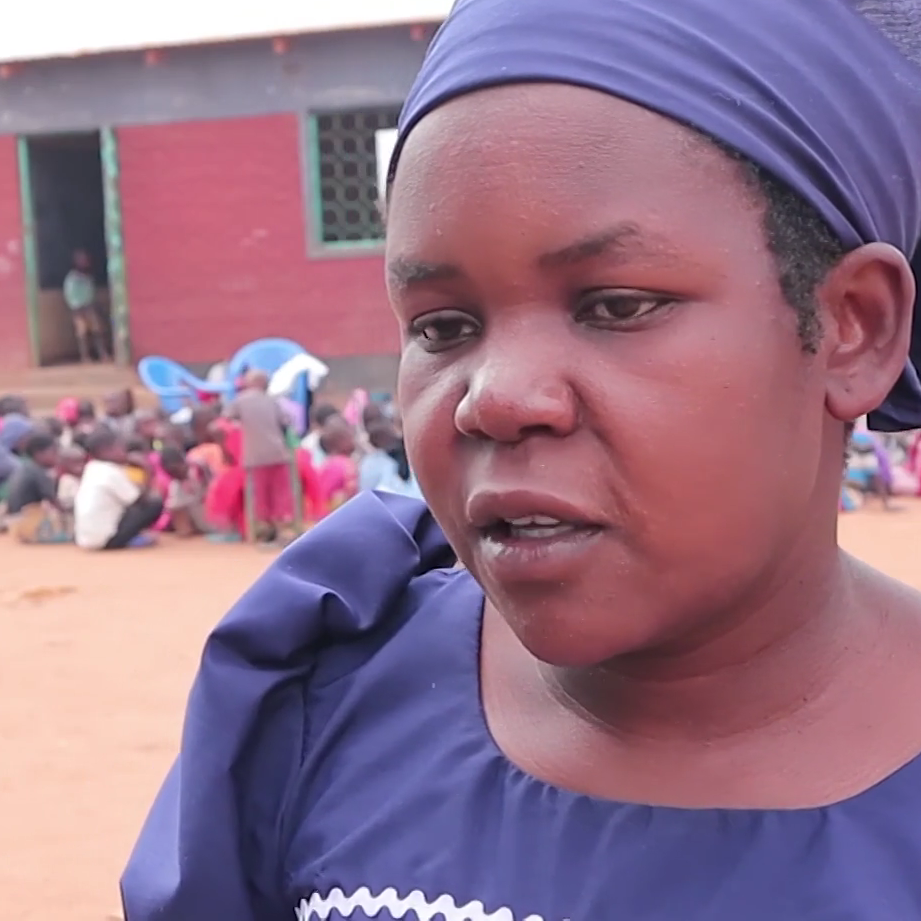
- photo by Voice of America
- Born: c.1997
- Occupation: teacher
- Known for: founding and organising an orphanage in Lilongwe
- Website: facebook

Temwani Chilenga (born c.1997) is a Malawian teacher who founded an orphanage in Lilongwe. She started the Zoe Foundation and she was awarded the Commonwealth Points of Light award.

== Life ==
Chilenga was born in about 1997. She was the fifth of seven children born to a meteorologist and a teacher.

She initially worked as a journalist before she trained in Dowa and became a teacher working at the St. John Convent Primary School. She cared about her students and having realised that some were orphans, she started the Zoe Foundation which in time looked after about 100 orphans.

She teaches at Chambu Primary School in the Area 25 community of Lilongwe. 60% of children do not complete primary education in Malawi even though the education is nominally free. Poor children cannot meet the small additional charges made by the school and orphans particularly need to find food and other essentials. Chilenga uses part of her salary and money from well-wishers to assist her pupils. Nearly a hundred children received school uniforms and home-grown food and many more benefit from the water tap,an improved classroom and learning materials.

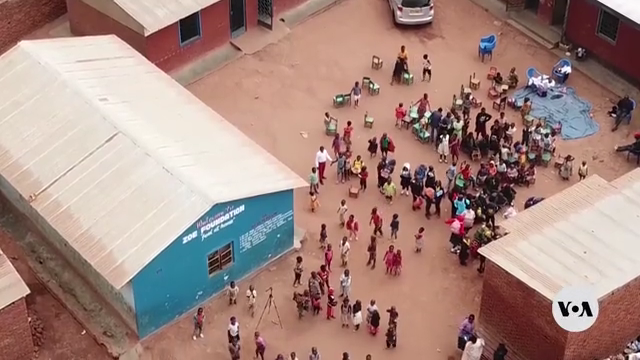
The Zoe Foundation

The orphanage is in Ndodani village near the city of Lilongwe.

Her work was recognised with a Commonwealth Points of Light award which has been awarded since 2018 after the UK Prime Minister extended an idea started in America to the commonwealth. These awards were presented in the name of Queen Elizabeth II, as Head of the Commonwealth.

In 2021 the Second Lady Mary Chilima paid for a meal for all the children in the orphanage. She and her Children First Trust donated other items and lauded Temwani Chilenga.

In 2024 her work was lauded by the future minister of health Madalitso Baloyi and supported by the Beautify Malawi Trust. Her foundation was given 3m kwacha by a Malawian lawyer and 5m kwacha by a Malawian Insurance company because they admired her work.

== See also ==
Tusaiwe Munkhondya
