= Kwathu Drama Group =

Malawian theatre comedy group

Kwathu Drama Group is a Malawian oldest drama group mainly composed of Eric Mabedi and John Nyanga, who died in 2021, that started in 1980. Mabedi died in 2022 after suffering from severe kidney damage. In 2020, the ensemble blamed the hospitality industry of Malawi for not supporting, improving and upgrading the status of stage performances in the country. In 2013, Kwathu Drama took campaigns against inequality in the country about the LGBQ.
