= International Law Institute =

Non-profit educational institution in Washington, DC

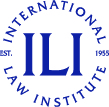
- Motto: Fostering Prosperity Through the Rule of Law
- Established: 1955
- Focus: International Development, Capacity Building, Technical Assistance
- Chair: Professor Don Wallace Jr.
- Key people: Stuart Kerr - Acting - Executive Director Robert Sargin - Director; Director of China Program
- Address: 1055 Thomas Jefferson St. NW Suite M-100
- Location: Georgetown, Washington D.C., United States
- Website: http://ili.org/

The International Law Institute, also known as the ILI, was founded as part of Georgetown University in 1955. The ILI provides training and technical assistance for the legal, economic and financial problems of developing countries and emerging economies. Since 1983, the ILI has been an independent, non-profit educational institution serving government officials, legal and business professionals and scholars from its headquarters in Washington, D.C. To date, the ILI and its global affiliates have trained over 39,400 officials, managers, and practitioners- from 186 countries- since it held its first seminar in 1971.

The ILI is headquartered in Washington, D.C., and has regional centers in Kampala, Uganda, Abuja, Nigeria, Cairo, Egypt, Santiago, Chile, and Istanbul, Turkey. The ILI's training and technical assistance programs are conducted by adjunct faculty and advisors, professionals of all nationalities from government, academia, multilateral organizations, and the private sector. 2

== History ==
The institute was founded in 1955 at the Georgetown University Law Center A sister institute, the Insitut für Ausländisches und Internationales Wirtschaftsrecht, was founded at the same time at Johannes Goethe University in Frankfurt, Germany; it continues its work today. Professor Heinrich Kronstein, the institute's first director, fled Germany in the 1930s and spent more than a decade studying and teaching at the law schools of Columbia University and Georgetown University. Following World War II he returned to Germany to work for the reconstruction of legal education. Professor Kronstein believed that closer ties between European and American legal systems would facilitate business and trade. The institute's early years were marked by scholarly work and academic exchanges.

Beginning in the early 1970s—under the leadership of a new director, Professor Don Wallace Jr., of Georgetown - the ILI expanded its focus to include professional training in the legal, economic, and financial problems of developing countries. An early collaborator in this work was Professor Robert Hellawell of Columbia University Law School.

The earliest courses offered were Foreign Investment Negotiation and International Procurement. Since then the curriculum has evolved to reflect, and promote, the centrality of the private sector and an enabling role on the part of the public sector in promoting the conditions for economic growth. This direction was heightened in the early 1990s when the institute's work expanded to include the problems facing nations formerly part of the Soviet Union as they began to make the transition to market economies and the rule of law.

Today the International Law Institute is an independent, not-for-profit organization. It continues to work closely with Georgetown University, as well as with numerous corporations, international organizations, and governments.

== Publications ==
The International Law Institute publishes numerous publications. The most notable is The Digest of United States Practice in International Law, covering developments in U.S. International Law annually, published with the assistance of the US State Department and the Oxford University Press. The Digest is available both in print and on the State Department's website. The posting on the web is the Department of State's Office of the Legal Adviser and the International Law Institute's attempt to make the historical record of U.S. practice of international law accessible.

The Digest traces its history back to an 1877 treatise by John Lambert Cadwalader, which was followed by multi-volume encyclopedias by Francis Wharton (1886), John Bassett Moore (1906), Green Hackworth (1940–1943) and Marjorie Whiteman(1963–1971), and an annual Digest beginning in 1973 under the editorship of Arthur Rovine and later Marion Nash Leich, which concluded with cumulative volumes for 1981–1988. Although publication was temporarily suspended after 1988, the office resumed publication in 2000 and has since produced volumes covering 1989 through 2008. A cumulative index covering 1989-2006 was published in 2007, and an updated edition of that index, covering 1989-2008 will be published in 2010.

In addition, the ILI publishes books on international and transnational commercial law, trade, litigation, commercial dispute resolution, and foreign legal systems. Recent and ongoing ILI publications include Introduction to Legal English, by Mark Wojcik, now in its third edition, designed to introduce legal English to law students and lawyers whose first language is not English; and International Judicial Assistance, by Bruno A. Ristau and Michael Abbell, a seven-volume work designed as a practical guide for attorneys engaged in transnational litigation.

== Training courses ==
The International Law Institute offers courses which cover topics relating to national and international business, investment, and governance. These topics include procurement, privatization, arbitration and mediation, negotiating and implementing trade agreements, The World Trade Organization (WTO) rights and obligations, project management, legislative drafting, judicial administration, corporate governance, bank restructuring, and borrowing & debt management.

The ILI runs the longest continually running U.S. legal orientation program, primarily serving foreign lawyers and law students preparing for graduate legal study (L.L.M) in the U.S. and others whose jobs require an understanding of the U.S. legal system. Two courses are offered: Introduction to Legal English and Legal Writing and Orientation to the U.S. Legal System. Participants are introduced to U.S. legal methods and process, central U.S. judicial doctrines, and the basic research skills needed in the study of the U.S. law and for communicating with the U.S. colleagues and clients.

== Leadership ==
=== Board of directors ===
Don Wallace Jr. (Chairman) Professor of Law Georgetown University Law Center

Stuart Kerr (Board President) Former Counsel, Jones Day Former Legal & Regulatory Director, Millennium Challenge Corporation

Spencer S. Griffith (Co-Vice Chairman) Partner - Akin Gump, LLP Former Managing Partner of Akin Gump's Beijing Office

Umit Herguner Founding Partner - Herguner Bilgen Ozeke Attorney Partnership, Istanbul Former President of the Turkish Corporate Governance Association Formerly Special Counsel, Reid & Priest, New York Former Asst. Professor of Public International Law, Istanbul University School of Law

Charles O. Verrill Jr. (Co-Vice Chairman and Treasurer) Former Partner, Wiley, Rein & Fielding Board of Visitors Duke University Law School Adjunct Professor of Law, Georgetown University

Stuart Kerr Acting Executive Director - International Law Institute

Robert Sargin Director - International Law Institute; Director of the ILI's Asia Initiatives. Board Member of Friends of the Law Library of Congress; Board Member of United Rule of Law Appeal [Non-ILI Board Member]

Kenneth Lazarus Partner - Lazarus & Associates Former Counsel to Present to the United States

Marian Hagler (Secretary) Managing Member, Hagler Law LLC, Denver, CO Former General Counsel, BOE Midstream, Denver, CO Former Partner, Dentons, Washington, DC Former of Counsel, Baker & McKenzie, Washington, DC

David Mao Assoc. Vice President & Chief Operating Officer, GULC, Washington, DC Former Acting Librarian, Library of Congress, Washington, DC

Swithin Munyantwali Vice Chairman- African Centre for Legal Excellence - (ILI Uganda) Former Chairman - Barclays Bank Uganda Independent Non Executive Director, Absa Group

John Niehuss Director, Center for Private Investment in Infrastructure, ILI Faculty, Michigan Law, University of Michigan

Eli Whitney Debevoise II Partner - Arnold & Porter LLP Former Executive Director, World Bank

Hongxia Liu Associate Vice Chancellor & Chief Operating Officer, New York University, Shanghai Formerly Executive Director at the World Justice Project Director of Legal Research at the US Law Library of Congress Representative and Director, Asia Pacific at International Law Development Organization (IDLO)

Elizabeth Anderson Executive Director, World Justice Project

Timothy Schnabel Executive Director of the Uniform Law Commission Former Attorney, US State Department Office of Legal Advisors

Alberto Mora Director, American Bar Association, Rule of Law Initiative Executive Director of Global Programs, Human Rights Center and UN Relations

Dr. Allan Goodman President of the Institute of International Education Former Executive Dean, School of Foreign Service and Professor at Georgetown University Former Consultant to Ford Foundation, the Woodrow Wilson National Fellowship Foundation, the United States Information Agency, and IBM

William Alford Vice Dean Graduate Program and International Legal Studies, Harvard University Director, East Asian Legal Studies Chair, Harvard Law School Project on Disability

Michael Baxter (Counsel to ILI - Non-Board Member) Partner - Convington & Burling

Dr. Borzu Sabahi Partner, Curtis Mallet Mallet-Prevost, Colt & Mosle LLP
