= Mcwilliam Lunguzi =

Malawian civil servant

Inspector General of Police, Malawi

Personal details
- Born: Maximiano Mcwilliam Lunguzi c. 1946
- Died: July 2, 1996 (aged 49–50) Near Mponela, Central Region, Malawi

Maximiano Mcwilliam Lunguzi (c. 1946 - July 2, 1996) was an Inspector General of Police in Malawi. He was removed from his post by President Bakili Muluzi and reassigned as a diplomat without an explanation in a move that was challenged by the court and ruled unconstitutional. He was charged with conspiracy to commit murder together with John Tembo, Cecilia Kadzamira but was acquitted.

He was alleged to have been involved in the Mwanza murders, in which three cabinet ministers and an MP were murdered in Mwanza. Lunguzi, John Tembo, Cecilia Kadzamira and police officers McDonald Kalemba and Leston Likawombe were charged with conspiracy to commit murder. They were all acquitted by Judge Mackson Mkandawire.

In 1995, after his retirement, he entered politics and showed signs of wanting to run for Malawi Congress Party president. He died before running for president, when his car ran into a stationary tractor, on July 2, 1996. President Bakkili Muluzi launched an investigation into his death due to the suspicious nature of the car accident.

== Pop culture ==
- He is mentioned in the book, And Crocodiles are Hungry at Night by Jack Mapanje, as the Prison Inspector who negotiated between Mapanje and President Banda while Mapanje was in jail.
- He is mentioned in the book Discourses of Empire and Commonwealth by Jack Mapanje.

Political offices
| Preceded by | Inspector Generals of Malawi | Succeeded by Joseph Aironi |
