= Mary Nangwale =

Malawian Inspector General and diplomat

Mary Nangwale (née Mvula; 27 March 1953 – 18 September 2016) was a Malawian police officer and diplomat. Appointed as Malawi's Inspector General in September 2004, she spent seven months in the role prior to a vote by the National Assembly that rejected her appointment. She continued her duties until a legal challenge against the Assembly's rejection was decided in August 2006. Nangwale is therefore recognised as the first woman to serve in the highest office of the Malawi Police Service, and the first woman to serve in an equivalent position in Southern Africa.

== Early life and career ==
Nangwale was born in 1953 in the Traditional Authority Mtwalo in Mzimba. She was educated at Marymount Secondary School, a Catholic school in Mzuzu.

In 1972, Nangwale joined the Malawi Police Service as a constable. She remained in the service for over 30 years.

== Inspector General ==
=== Appointment: 2005 ===
On 6 September 2004, Malawi's president Bingu wa Mutharika selected Nangwale to become Malawi's first female Inspector General. She would be the first woman to serve in an equivalent position in Southern Africa.

President Mutharika had come to power after defecting from the United Democratic Front to form his own party the previous year. Within this political context, Mutharika's former party cooperated with the official opposition, the Malawi Congress Party, in order to block Nangwale's appointment. On 30 March 2005, the National Assembly voted to reject Nangwale 88 votes to 83. Breaking from her party, Malawi Congress politician Kate Kainja voted to confirm Nangwale, and resigned following the vote.

In the immediate aftermath of the vote, Nangwale was granted administrative leave and her deputy, Often Thyolani, was appointed acting Inspector General. Following the National Assembly's decision to block Nangwale's appointment, Linda Ziyendammanja, speaking on behalf of the Malawi Law Society, assessed that Nangwale had been "rejected because of political jockeying".

=== Legal challenge and actions as Inspector General ===
Nangwale and Malawi's executive challenged the rejection of her appointment before the Constitutional Court of Malawi.

While legal proceedings were underway, Nangwale was permitted to act as Inspector General. Her most significant achievement while in office was to introduce an emergency telephone number, 997 Rapid Response, for the Malawi Police Service. The service ran until 2016, when it was briefly discontinued; it was reintroduced in November 2025.

Nangwale also oversaw the introduction of a mandatory training manual on human rights that police officers in the country would be expected to learn from. In her foreword for the manual, Nangwale wrote: "I believe that the implementation of this human rights training comes in at an opportune time when we are desirous of fulfilling our aspirations of becoming more humane and responsive police service... I say this on the basis of my firm belief that in countries where human rights are constitutionally protected, the relationship between the police and the citizenry can more easily be of co-operation and support."

On 24 August 2006, the court ultimately refused to intervene in a dispute between Malawi's executive and legislature, upholding the National Assembly's decision to reject Nangwale's appointment. Malawi would next see a woman in the role of Inspector General in 2022, following the appointment of Merlyn Yolamu.

== Diplomatic representative ==
Shortly after the court's decision, Nangwale accepted a position as a senior diplomat at Malawi's High Commission in London. While in the United Kingdom, she began experiencing kidney problems. She remained in the role until June 2012, when she returned to Malawi.

== Later life and death ==
Upon returning to Malawi, Nangwale became a pastor at Living Waters Church in Chimwankhunda, Blantyre.

=== Death ===
Nangwale died of kidney failure at Mwaiwathu Hospital on 18 September 2016. She received full police honours at her funeral, which was held at Living Waters Church. Survived by two children, she was buried at Limbe Cemetery.
