= Robin Broadhead =

- Born: May 3, 1943; Edenbridge, Kent, England
- Died: April 19, 2026 (aged 82); Blantyre, Malawi
- Occupation: College Principal
- Known for: co-founded Malawi's first medical school.

Robin Broadhead (May 3, 1943 – April 19, 2026) was a British academic and artist who co-founded Malawi's first medical school. He was the Professor of Paediatrics at the University of Malawi's College of Medicine.

== Life ==
Broadhead was born in 1943 in Edenbridge.

Before settling in Malawi, he worked in Sudan, Libya, Malaysia, Thailand, and India.

He co-founded Malawi's first medical school, where he employed the first 15 members of staff, including Macpherson Mallewa. He was based at the Queen Elizabeth Central Hospital. In 1991, he became Professor of Paediatrics at the University of Malawi's College of Medicine.

== Death and Legacy ==
Broadhead has a painting in the University of Liverpool's collection. He died of Parkinson's disease in 2026 in Newlands, Blantyre. The Ministry of Health paid tribute to him.

His funeral was held at the Kuhes Sports complex, where the vice-chancellor acknowledged him as his mentor. He noted that Broadhead had helped fund buildings on site, including the John Chiphangwi Learning Resource Centre and the Chimutu Building, using funds from the Norwegian Embassy. The name 'Chimutu' refers to Broadhead, as chimutu is the Chichewa word for "broadhead".

In August 2026, Alder Hey signed a memorandum of understanding with the Department of Paediatrics and Child Health at Kamuzu University of Health Sciences to record their future intentions. It was noted that this valuable collaboration built on the work of Robin Broadhead and Prof Elizabeth Molyneux.
