= Jessie Kabwila =

Malawian politician, academic, feminist, educator and activist

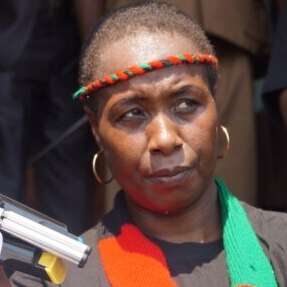
- Kabwila in 2017
- Born: Jessie Kabwila-Kapasula
- Education: Binghamton University
- Occupations: Politician and academic
- Employer: University of Malawi
- Known for: Union organiser and Minister of Higher Education

Jessie Kabwila-Kapasula is a Malawian academic, feminist, educator and activist. Her scholarship focuses on African feminism. She was chair of the Malawi Parliamentary Women's Caucus and in 2025 she became the Minister of Higher Education. She lost her seat in the 2025 Malawian general election.

== Life ==
Kabwila-Kapasula was the acting president of the Chancellor College Academic Staff Union that was fired during the standoff to ensure academic freedom at the University of Malawi that has not been resolved. She is one of the fired lecturers at the center of the standoff for academic freedom that occurred at the University of Malawi (UNIMA) which resulted in her dismissal. This prompted protests from the UNIMA students and faculty that stood in solidarity with Kabwila-Kapasula and the eventual closure of the university. It led to a standoff between President Bingu wa Mutharika and the lecturers. Her dismissal centering academic freedom was also one of the events that led to the 2011 Malawian protests.

== Early career ==
Kabwila earned a doctorate in comparative literature from Binghamton University, where she served as president of the Graduate Student Organization in 2008–2009.

== Academic freedom standoff ==
Blessings Chinsinga, an associate political science professor, was interrogated by Peter Mukhito, who was Malawi’s Inspector General of Police, about a parallel he drew in a lecture between Malawi’s fuel crisis and popular uprisings in Tunisia and Egypt during the Arab Spring. Chinsinga was eventually fired for drawing these comparisons between the economic conditions in Egypt and Malawi in a political science class. This prompted support from the UNIMA students and faculty including Kabwila. They stood in solidarity with Chisanga and this led to the closure of the university's Chancellor College and its Polytechnic. As a condition to return to class, the academics asked for an official apology from the police chief, Peter Mukhito and assurances of respect for academic freedom. Mukhito declared that academic freedom had to be balanced with issues of national security and this was backed by President Bingu wa Mutharika. Mutharika ordered the faculty to return to work but the lecturers refused, since there was no guarantee of freedom. The government was unwilling to provide this under the leadership of The Minister of Education, Peter Mutharika. The students stood in solidarity with the fired faculty which resulted in the use of teargas to disperse students. A standoff occurred between lecturers and students on one side, and the President of Malawi, Bingu wa Mutharika.

After the incident, Kabwila reported that she has been denied a passport renewal and she had received harassing phone calls and death threats.

In 2017, domestic violence was in the news, when seven women were killed or wounded in attacks. Protests and a petition were organised in Lilongwe. Sarai Chisala Tempelhoff of the Women's Lawyer Association read a petition and Kabwila, who was a member of parliament and the chair of Malawi Parliamentary Women's Caucus, was there is support of the protests. During Kabwila's time as chair of the caucus, the age of consent in Malawi was raised to eighteen to prevent child marriage.

== Court case ==
The lecturers sued the government in order to ensure academic freedom and non-interference by the police in academia.

=== Support of academic freedom ===
Many Malawian organizations are showing their support to guarantee academic freedom including the Malawi Law Society and Malawi Congress oTrade Unions. Students at Binghamton University (SUNY), Kabwila's alma mater, have urged Amnesty International to take up this case.

== Student activist death ==
Kabwila attended the funeral of Polytechnic student Robert Chasowa, a Malawian student at the same university that was a student activist of Youth for Freedom and Democracy (YFD), a student activist group. Kabwila-Kapasula dressed in red clothes with a red cloth around her mouth to symbolize the silencing of students under the Bingu wa Mutharika administration.

== Politics ==
Kabwila was the member of parliament for the Salima North west constituency under the Malawi Congress Party before 2021.

In 2022 she became the acting Executive Director of the Malawi Institute of Management as she had taken the position while Acting Executive Director, Samson Sikelo Phiri was accused of financial mismanagement over a 20m kwacha loss. He was cleared in September 2022 but while he was suspended his contract had lapsed. Kabwila was left as acting Executive Director.

In 2024, she returned, forgiven, to the Malawi Congress Party where she was appointed to be the party's publicity secretary. She was confident at that time that the MCP would be re-elected in 2025.

In 2025, she became the Minister of Higher Education after she was appointed by President Lazarus Chakwera. On the same day others were also appointed including Joyce Chitsulo who became the Deputy Minister of Local Government and Patricia Nangozo Kainga became Deputy Minister of Foreign Affairs. She stood in the 2025 Malawian General Election to represent the Salima Central West constituency and lost her seat.

Kabwila was speaking for the Malawi Congress Party in 2026, criticising the government's spending plans announced by Finance Minister Joseph Mwanamvekha. In August was among a group of MPs that included Pilirani Buleya who went to Area 3 Police Station to protest after MP George Kadzipatike was detained. Kabwila spoke on behalf of the group. Kadzipatike was the Malawi Congress Party (MCP) legal director and his fellow MPs believed he was arrested for political reasons. Kadzipatike was arrested following a tax dispute which the group felt was disproportionate.
