= Heinrich Kronstein =

Heinrich David Kronstein (September 12, 1897 in Karlsruhe – September 26, 1972 in Frankfurt) was a German lawyer and university professor. From late 1935 to early 1951, he lived in the U.S. and was an advisor in cartel matters and on the German question after WW II.

== Childhood, education and career in the German Reich ==
Kronstein came from a respected and wealthy Jewish family of Karlsruhe. He did his military service in the First World War and suffered a severe wound. Later he began studying law in Heidelberg and Berlin. Kronstein received his doctorate in 1924 from Martin Wolff in Berlin. He then worked as a lawyer in Mannheim, where he founded in 1931 together with Wilhelm Zutt the law firm "Kronstein Zutt" and specialized in patent law. Until 1935 he was still able to work as a lawyer in Germany, inter alias in the settlement of the sale of Jewish companies ("Aryanization").

== Exile in the US ==
At the end of 1935, Kronstein emigrated with his family to the United States and first tried to work in New York City as a consultant on foreign law. He studied law in New York from 1936 (Columbia University) with a Bachelor of Laws degree. In 1939 he moved to Washington D.C., graduated in 1940 at the Georgetown University Law School in Washington a second time, made in 1941 the "bar exam" for international law and became "Professor of Comparative Law."

Since 1936, Kronstein worked as a freelancer for the U.S. Department of Justice as a translator and appraiser. After gaining US citizenship, he was appointed a permanent Special Attorney in 1941. Kronstein worked initially or predominantly for the Claims Division, but had reservations about having to confiscate German assets after America entered the war against Germany. Because of his special knowledge of patent law and patent cartels and because of his background being from Germany Kronstein served in the Ministry of Justice as a cartel expert. To do this, in 1941/1942 he moved to the Antitrust division under Thurman Arnold. From the beginning on, he did important work for this division: In front of the Senate Commission on Patent Affairs Kronstein suggested that the cartelized economic structure of Germany had facilitated Hitler the seizure of power. In the Department of Justice, he was also a member of the so-called Antimonopoly Committee, which dealt with the reconstruction of Europe after the war.

From 1946 Kronstein taught as a full professor at Georgetown University in Washington, D.C.

== Later career in the Federal Republic of Germany ==
From 1951 to 1965, Kronstein taught at the Law Faculty of Johann Wolfgang Goethe University Frankfurt am Main. In the years 1956/57 he officiated there as a full professor of commercial law.

In 1967, Kronstein was awarded the Federal German Cross of Merit.
