= Patricia Nangozo Kainga =

Malawian politician

Patricia Nangozo Kainga is a politician in Malawi. Kainga represents Zomba Central in the National Assembly of Malawi.

In January 2025 she became Deputy Minister of Foreign Affairs. She was appointed by President Dr. Lazarus Chakwera. On the same day others were also appointed including Joyce Chitsulo who became the Deputy Minister of Local Government and Jessie Kabwila-Kapasula became the Minister of Higher Education.

== See also ==
- Politics of Malawi
