= Dorothy Nampota =

Malawian educator

Dorothy Cynthia Nampota is a Malawian educator and academic in science education. She is the executive director of the Malawi National Examinations Board (MANEB) and an associate professor at the University of Malawi.

== Education ==
Nampota obtained a Bachelor of Education from the University of Malawi in 1991. In 1997, she received a Master of Arts degree from King's College, University of London, and completed her PhD in Science Education at the University of Bath in 2005.

== Academic career ==
Dorothy joined the University of Malawi in 1992. She has served as Head of the Department of Curriculum and Teaching Studies (2005–2009), Deputy Dean of the Faculty of Education (2005–2006), and Director of the Centre for Educational Research and Training.

Nampota was appointed Acting Executive Director of the Malawi National Examinations Board. She was confirmed as executive director in October 2021.
