= Boniface Kalindo =

Malawian politician

Bon Kalindo
- Born: 6 June 1980 (age 46); Malawi
- Other name: Winiko
- Education: Mzuzu University
- Occupation: comedian

Bon Kalindo also known as Winiko (born 6 June 1980) is a Malawian activist, comedian, politician and actor. In 2023, Kalindo protested against the Malawi Congress Party whose president is Lazarus Chakwera, the current president of Malawi, to step down out of presidency due to devaluation of the country's currency. He was arrested several times. On 30 August 2023, he was arrested and released out of the prison the same day.

In September 2023, Kalindo was criticized when he said that the country will can benefit a lot from Europeans if they come and stay in the country.

An organization called Leadership Institute for Transparency and Accountability (LITA) commented on the arrest of Kalindo it was a planned plot by the Malawi Congress Party (MCP) administration to frustrate peaceful demonstrations.

On 18 May 2023, Kalindo sued Minister of Homeland Security of Malawi, Ken Zikhale Ng'oma to pay him K50 million over alleged defamation. Kalindo's lawyer, Gilbert Khonyongwa told the minister to pay the money within seven days.
