= Tapiwa Uchizi Nyasulu =

Malawian diplomat (born 1978)

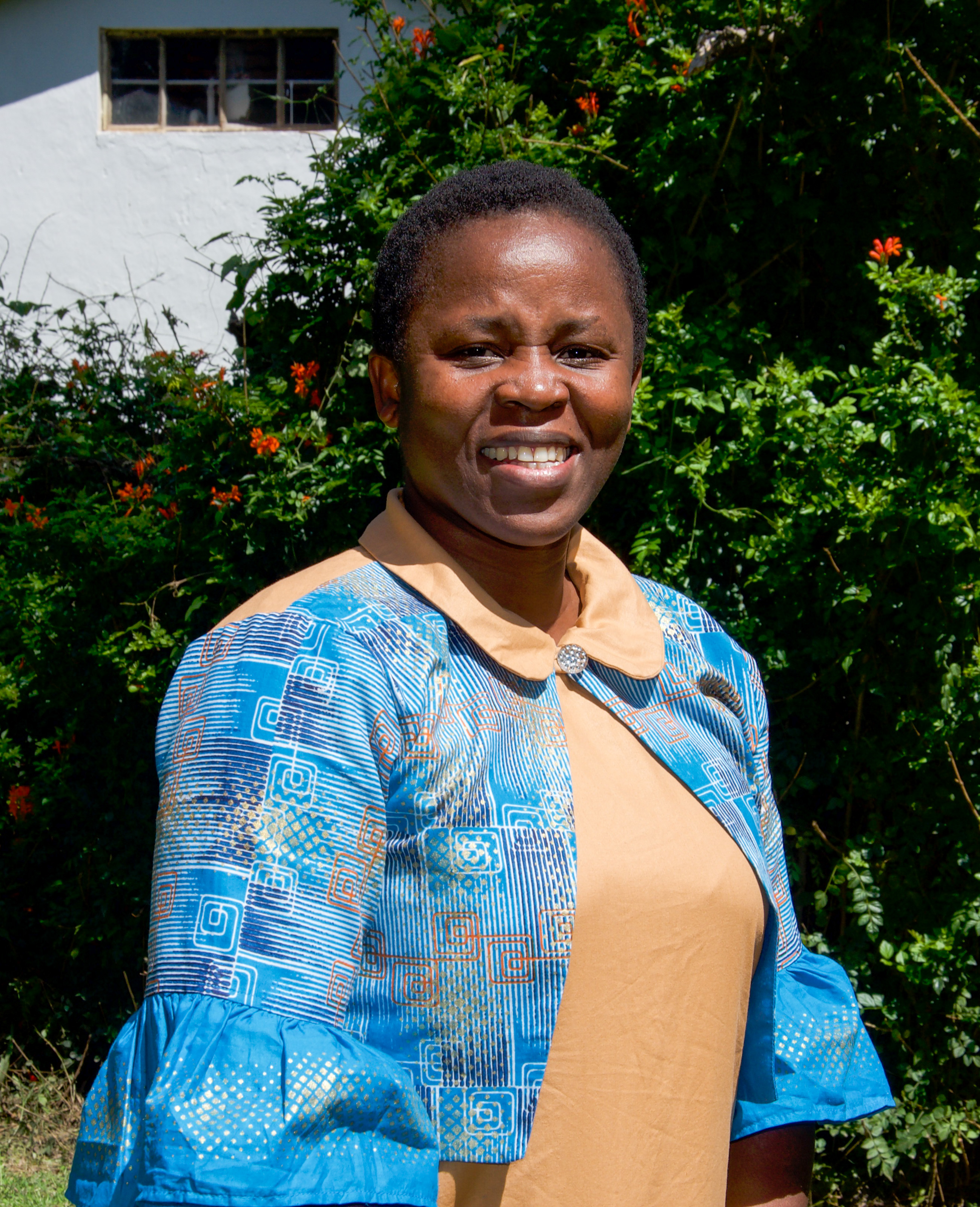

Head, Women and Gender Policy at the African Union
- Appointed by: Macky Sall

Personal details
- Born: 15 August 1978 (age 48) Karonga
- Children: Jayden Rweyemamu
- Occupation: Diplomat

Tapiwa Uchizi Nyasulu (born 15 August 1978), is a Malawian diplomat, social scientist, women's rights activist, anti-corruption activist and academic. Tapiwa is currently the Regional Advisor on Gender and Human Rights at the United Nations Population Fund (UNFPA) for East and Southern Africa. Before joining UNFPA, she led on Women and Gender Policy and Development at the African Union. She was also the Regional Advisor for Southern Africa at Transparency International, where she managed and implemented the Africa Regional Anti-Corruption Programme.

== Early life and education ==
Tapiwa was born in Karonga District in northern Malawi to Malawian parents. She attended Chancellor College of the University of Malawi between 1998-2002 and holds a bachelor's degree in Arts Humanities. Between 2006 and 2007, she attended the Institute of Social Studies in The Hague, Netherlands where she obtained a master's degree in Development Studies specialized in politics of Alternative Development. Tapiwa holds a PhD in Social Anthropology from the University of Cologne, Germany through the Centre for Development Research of the University of Bonn. Her doctoral research sought to gauge the governance aspect (accountability and legitimacy) in customary land tenure in peri-urban Kasoa, Ghana.

== Career ==
Tapiwa led the Women and Gender Policy and Development Division of the African Union Commission in Addis Ababa, Ethiopia. She coordinated policy development on gender parity, gender equality and women and girl's empowerment of the African Union. She also led the implementation of the African Women's Decade on Financial and Economic Inclusion of African Women 2020-2030, including the Women and Youth Financial and Economic Inclusion Initiative.

Upon graduation in 2002, she worked with the Deutsche Gesellschaft für Internationale Zusammenarbeit (GIZ) in a Malawi-Germany Programme for Democracy and Decentralization from 2003 to 2006. She then joined the Danish Association for International Cooperation (MS-Zambia) in Zambia in 2006. Early in her career, she also lectured at the University of Applied Management in Accra, Ghana.

Before joining the African Union, she was Regional Advisor – Southern Africa for Transparency International Secretariat, based in Berlin, Germany. For seven years, she managed and implemented the Africa Regional Anti-Corruption Programme in the region. She coordinated capacity development and advocacy interventions as well as ensuring the implementation of the accreditation policy. She was instrumental to the development of chapters and partners of Transparency International in countries including South Africa, Malawi, Angola, Botswana and Namibia.

Tapiwa has also worked with the International Labour Organization in Geneva, Switzerland. Between 2011 and 2012, she supported the ILO/CRISIS Capacity Building and Knowledge Development programme, and supported ILO's staff and constituents in implementing a disasters and conflict response programme, aimed at recovery and creating decent work in post-crisis scenarios.

She joined United Nations Population Fund East and Central Africa Regional Office based in Sandton, Johannesbourg in 2024 as the Regional Advisor on Gender and Human Rights.

== Publications ==
- Nyasulu, Tapiwa Uchizi (2012). Governance and Customary Land Tenure in Peri-Urban Kasoa in Ghana. PhD thesis, Universität zu Köln.
- Ampadu, Richard Ameyaw and Tapiwa Uchizi Nyasulu. 2011. Customary Land Access and Accountability in Ghana: Effects of Land Allocation Practices on Local Livelihoods (2011)
- Nyasulu, Tapiwa Uchizi (2011) Watchdog NGOs in Malawi: The Case of Centre for Human Rights and Rehabilitation. Unveiling Challenges and Opportunities in Promoting Governance. LAP Lambert Academic Publishing, Germany

== Personal life ==
Tapiwa has a son named Jayden. She has two brothers Abwino and Anderson and a sister Ruth.
