= Mandebvu Agness Chatipwa =

Malawian politician

Agness Mandebvu Chatipwa is a Malawian politician who became a Deputy Minister.

== Life ==
She ran as an independent candidate for the constituency of Nkhotakota South East constituency in the 2009 Malawian general election. She won the election with 6,519 votes beating her rivals from the two main parties who both had over 5,000 votes.

She was chosen as the deputy minister of Education, Science and Technology in 2013 during former president Dr. Joyce Banda's regime.

Before being elected as the Deputy Minister of Education, she served as the Deputy Minister of Health. She oversaw many developments in the health sector during her time in office.
