= Allan Ngumuya =

- Citizenship: Malawi
- Occupation: Musician

Allan Ngumuya is a Malawian gospel artist and politician. He was one of the most prolific members of the Malawi music industry. In 2003 he released the album I've Got Hope.

Born and raised in Zingwangwa, Blantyre, Ngumuya ventured into the music industry in 1988 with the launch of his debut album 'Nthawi'. Ngumuya joined politics in after successfully running for the Blantyre City South Constituency as an independent candidate in 2014. However, Ngumuya joined the ruling Democratic Progressive Party (DPP) immediately after the elections.

On 7 July 2020, Ngumuya tested positive for COVID-19.
