= Rachel Sibande =

Malawian technology expert and computer scientist (born 1986)

- Sibande in 2020
- Born: January 9, 1986 (age 40); Lilongwe, Malawi
- Occupations: Senior Program Officer, Artificial Intelligence.
- Years active: 2005 -
- Website: rachelsibande.com

Rachel Sibande (born January 9, 1986, in Lilongwe, Malawi) is a Malawian computer scientist, digital development specialist, and social entrepreneur. She is the founder of mHub, Malawi's first technology and innovation hub, which supports innovators and emerging entrepreneurs through technology development, skills training and business incubation.

She works at the Gates Foundation, where she leads the AI Scaling Hub initiative, supporting the adoption and scaling of Artificial Intelligence across sectors including health, agriculture and education. Her work encompasses partnerships with governments, researchers and other organisations on digital transformation, data and Artificial Intelligence. She has more than 20 years of experience spanning academia, international development, technology and social enterprise, and has managed technology-for-development projects across 22 low and middle-income countries.

Before joining the Gates Foundation, Rachel served as a senior director at the United Nations Foundation, where she led work on big data, artificial intelligence, machine learning and digital transformation in Africa. Through mHub, she has supported the development and deployment of technology solutions in areas including health, education, citizen engagement and election monitoring. mHub has developed and deployed over 35 technology solutions across over 12 countries, trained over 153,000 young people in digital skills and invested more than US$5.2 million in young entrepreneurs and their businesses.

Rachel holds a PhD in Computer Science from Rhodes University in South Africa. She received the Google Anita Borg Scholarship for outstanding computer science scholars in 2015and was named one of Africa's 30 most promising entrepreneurs under the age of 30 by Forbes in 2016. In 2018, she won the climate-smart category of the Next Einstein Forum's innovation competition for a project using maize cobs to generate electricity for rural mini-grids.

== Early life and education ==
At age 15, Sibande enrolled at the University of Malawi's Chancellor College, graduating with a Bachelor of Science degree (with Credit) in computer science in 2006.[6]

She attained a Master of Science (with Distinction) in Information Theory, Coding, and Cryptography from Mzuzu University in 2009.

She earned a PhD in Computer Science from Rhodes University, South Africa, in 2021 as a Google Scholar. Her doctoral research led to the development of technology solutions for elections monitoring, which have since been deployed in general elections across multiple African countries

She attained an Executive Master of Business Administration (EMBA) at the University of Oxford, United Kingdom ( 2025).

Additional Certifications:

- Certificate in Entrepreneurship for Scientists and Engineers, International Centre for Theoretical Physics (ICTP), Italy, 2016
- Certificate in Wireless Networking, ICTP, Italy, 2008
- Certificate in Financial Accounting, Public Accountants Examinations Council of Malawi (PAEC), 2006

== Career ==
=== Gates Foundation (2023–Present) ===
Sibande currently serves as Senior Officer for Artificial Intelligence (AI) in Africa at the Bill & Melinda Gates Foundation. She leads the AI Scaling Hub initiative, which identifies and scales high-impact AI use cases across health, education, agriculture, and gender domains. She manages a 120-member global community of practice of Generative AI grantees and leads partnerships with African governments, private sector, academia, regulatory authorities, and NGOs on digital, data, and AI. She has led the investment in establishing Rwanda's first National Health Intelligence Centre and has made over $30 million in investments across the East Africa region in primary health care, development policy, agriculture, and women's economic empowerment.

=== United Nations Foundation (2017–2023) ===
As Senior Director for Country Outreach–Africa and Data for Development at the United Nations Foundation / Digital Impact Alliance (DIAL), Sibande led a team supporting 13 countries (Kenya, Rwanda, Uganda, Tanzania, Malawi, Mozambique, Sierra Leone, Senegal, Ghana, DRC, Nepal, Haiti, and Colombia) to accelerate digital transformation through digital public infrastructure and government services. She led the solution architecture of supervised machine learning models and managed a team of data scientists, AI experts, software engineers, and project managers across 11 deployments. She represented UNF/DIAL at global forums including the World Data Forum, World Summit on the Information Society, and the Global Digital Development Forum.

=== Palladium Group (2016–2017) ===
As Deputy Chief of Party for the USAID-funded Feed the Future Agriculture Diversification Project ($47 million), Sibande led the programmatic implementation of financial services, nutrition, gender, and youth portfolios across three agricultural value chains. Under her oversight, the project facilitated the injection of over $760,000 in capital into informal women-led savings groups, supported over 2,200 poor households with agricultural kits, and disbursed over 1 million post-harvest hermetically sealed storage bags.

=== mHub Malawi – Founder and Director (2014–2016) ===
Sibande established Malawi's first technology hub and incubator. Under her leadership, mHub developed over 35 technology solutions deployed across 12 countries, including digital solutions for elections monitoring used in Malawi, Zambia, Zimbabwe, Tanzania, Mozambique, Sierra Leone, Lesotho, and Senegal—for organizations such as the International Foundation for Electoral Systems (IFES), the Open Society Foundation, and civil society organizations. She also led encryption and cybersecurity solutions, conducted security audits and vulnerability assessments, and trained Malawi Defence Forces staff on digital forensics. mHub injected over $2.2 million into startups, created more than 23,000 jobs, and trained over 153,000 youths with digital skills in web and mobile app development, robotics, big data, AI, machine learning, IoT, and 3D printing.

=== Agribusiness Systems International (2013–2015) ===
As Country Director for the Technology for Extension to Smallholders (TEXTS) Project, Sibande led the deployment of Malawi's first digital agricultural extension platform in partnership with the Ministry of Agriculture. She led a team of over 23 staff to institutionalize the e-Soko platform across 10 agricultural value chains, impacting over 400,000 smallholders in 18 months.

=== ACDI/VOCA and CARANA Corporation (2009–2013) ===
As Chief of Party / Deputy Chief of Party for the Market Linkages Initiative Project ($35 million, USAID-funded), Sibande led a team of 29 staff and consultants across 7 countries (Rwanda, Kenya, Burundi, Tanzania, South Sudan, DRC, and Malawi). The program expanded grain bulking storage by 6 times in tonnage, established market enumeration systems across 28 markets integrating over 700,000 smallholders, and supported the warehouse receipt system at the Agricultural Commodity Exchange.

=== Earlier Career ===
- Statistics Lecturer, Mzuzu University, Department of Mathematics (2007–2009) — taught statistics to Bachelor of Science in Renewable Energy students.
- ICT Teacher, Kamuzu Academy (2005–2007) — taught ICT to Forms 1 through Lower 6.

== Honors and awards ==
Year	Award	Awarding Body
2025	Women Led ICT Firm	ICT Association of Malawi
2022	Zikomo Excellence Awards	President of the Republic of Malawi
2019	New Wealth Creator, Forbes Woman Africa	Forbes Woman Africa, South Africa
2018	Winner, Innovation to Invention Challenge, Climate Smart Track	Next Einstein Forum (NEF), Rwanda
2017	Young Visionary Leader of the World	World Youth Forum, Egypt
2017	Award of Excellence in contribution to ICT Skills Development	Commonwealth Association of Technical Universities and Polytechnics in Africa
2016	First Local to hold TEDx Lilongwe license	TED Global, USA
2016	Next Einstein Fellow	African Institute for Mathematical Sciences / NEF, Senegal
2016	30 under 30 Most Promising Young Entrepreneurs in Africa	Forbes, Africa
2015	Google Anita Borg Scholarship	Google, United Kingdom
2012	Young African Leaders Initiative (YALI) Alumni	President of the USA , Barrack Obama

== Board and Volunatary Service ==
- Director of the Board & Chairperson, Technology, Engineering and Innovation Committee — Standard Bank Malawi Plc (2020–Present)
- Board Member — PATH Global, Seattle, USA (2019–2022)
- Board Member — GiveDirectly, Malawi (2019–2023)
- Board Chairperson — Girl Effect, Malawi (2016–2020)
- Director — mHub (2014–Present)
- Board Member — ACDI/VOCA, Malawi (2013–2016)
- Board Member — Esoko (2012–2015)

== Selected Publications ==
  - Sibande, R. and Chipeta, G. "Developing a Machine Learning Predictive Model for Mobile Network Traffic Forecasting in Malawi." IST-Africa, 2025.
  - Digital Impact Alliance and Data Pop Alliance. "MD4D Handbook: An Interactive Resource to Gain Knowledge and Skills for Designing and Implementing Mobile Data for Development Projects." DIAL Resource Portal, 2021.
  - Sibande, R. "The Role of ICT in Electoral Processes: The Case of the 2019 General Elections in Malawi." In Democracy Tested: The Case of Malawi's 2019 Tripartite Elections, pp. 103–141, 2021. Lilongwe: NICE.
  - Green, D., Sibande, R., Moszczynski, M., Asbah, S., et al. "Using Mobile Phone Data for Epidemic Response in Low Resource Settings—A Case Study of COVID-19 in Malawi." Cambridge University Press, Data and Policy, 3(e19), 2021.
  - Kanengoni, A.D., Fungurani, T., Nyanungo, H.N., and Chavula-Sibande, R., et al. "Buwa! Youth in Africa: Dominant & Counter Narratives." Open Society Initiative for Southern Africa, 8, 2017.
  - Knippenberg, E., Sibande, R., Chirwa, E., and Smith, T., et al. "Using Mobile Phone Data to Make Policy Decisions: A Study in How New Data Sources Optimized Health Facility Placement in Malawi." Digital Impact Alliance.
  - Sibande, R., Sang, D., and Natt, T.S., et al. "Using MNO Data for COVID-19 Response." Digital Impact Alliance, 2020.
  - Sibande, R. "Using Mobile Network Operator Data for COVID-19 Response." Digital Impact Alliance, 2020.
  - Sibande, R. and Thinyane, H. "A Mobile Based Technology Platform for Citizen Engagement in Malawi." IST-Africa Week Conference, 2016, 1–10.
  - United Nations Conference on Trade and Development. "Malawi Rapid eTrade Readiness Assessment." United Nations, 2019.
