= Kamuzu University of Health Sciences =

Medical and nursing school in Malawi

- Type: Public
- Established: 2019; 7 years ago
- Vice-Chancellor: Professor Macpherson Mallewa
- Location: Blantyre, Malawi; 15°48′06″S 35°00′56″E
- Campus: Urban
- Website: Homepage
- Location within Malawi

The Kamuzu University of Health Sciences (KUHeS) is a public university in Malawi. It was created in 2019 by separating and then merging the College of Medicine and the Kamuzu College of Nursing from the University of Malawi. The Faculty of Medicine of KUHeS is the only medical school in Malawi.

== Location ==
The university's main campus is located along Mahatma Gandhi Avenue, in Blantyre. It is adjacent to Queen Elizabeth Central Hospital, the University's teaching hospital.

The medical college has a campus along Mzimba Road, in Lilongwe.

One of the campuses is in Mangochi, along the southern shores of Lake Malawi, at Mangochi District Hospital.

== Overview ==
The Kamuzu University of Health Sciences (KUHeS) was created in 2019 by merging the College of Medicine and the College of nursing. These colleges were part of the old structure of the University of Malawi from when it was created in 1991. The other two colleges were Chancellor College in Zomba and The Polytechnic, in Blantyre.

== Governance ==
The chancellor of the university is the President of Malawi. Professor Macpherson Mallewa became the vice-chancellor in 2022. In 2023 President Dr Lazerus Chakwera appointed Belinda Gombachika as the deputy-vice-chancellor.

== Nursing ==
Historically, entry requirements for nursing and paramedical training institutions is the Malawi School Certificate of Education (Ordinary Level). Nursing and midwifery training were for three years and offered at the College of Health Sciences and any of the eight mission nursing schools in mostly rural mission hospitals. The superseded Kamuzu College of Nursing provides nursing degrees categorised as generic (degrees offered to students enrolled straight from secondary school), post-basic (degrees offered to enrolled nurses who have "acceptable" O-level grades and with at least two years of service) Bachelor of Science in Advanced Midwifery and Diploma in Nursing. Out of an estimated 4000 nurses active in Malawi in 2005, 453 who had been trained in Malawi were reported to be working in OECD countries like Malawi. This represented 11.3% of the number of nurses.

== Alumni ==
In 2015 Eveles Chimala who was a student was identified as one of the BBC's 100 inspirational women. She was working as a midwife who was said to be worked in the Malawi's busiest ward and she was investigating why the standard graph for recording the size of the cervix (a partograph) wasn't helping in her hospital.

== Medicine ==
The faculty of Medicine's anchor academic program was the five-year Bachelor of Medicine, Bachelor of Surgery (MBBS) degree. Other undergraduate programs included Bachelor of Pharmacy and Bachelor of Medical Laboratory Science.

Postgraduate degrees offered at the medical college include the two-year Master of Public Health, the four-year Master of Medicine in the clinical disciplines, and a Doctoral degree programme in collaboration with outside institutions.

== Undergraduate courses ==
The following undergraduate courses are offered at UMCM.

- Bachelor of Medicine and Bachelor of Surgery (MBBS)
- Bachelor of Pharmacy (BPharm)
- Bachelor of Science in Medical Laboratory Sciences (BMLS)
- Bachelor of Science in Physiotherapy
- Bachelor of Science in Dental Surgery (BDS)
- Bachelor of Science in Nutrition and Dietetics (BND)
- Bachelor of Science in Biomedical Sciences (BMS)
- Bachelor of occupation therapy (BOT)

== Graduate courses ==
The following postgraduate courses were offered in 2018.

1. Master of Medicine (MMed) in Internal Medicine
2. Master of Medicine (MMed) in Family Medicine
3. Master of Medicine (MMed) in Obstetrics and Gynecology -
4. Master of Medicine (MMed) in Pediatrics
5. Master of Medicine (MMed) in General Surgery
6. Doctor of Philosophy (PhD)

== See also ==
- Eric Borgstein
- Education in Malawi
- University of Malawi
- Mercy James Institute for Pediatric Surgery and Intensive Care
- List of universities in Malawi
