= Beatrice Chipeta =

Malawian Catholic nun and humanitarian (1942–2019)

Sister Beatrice Chipeta
- Born: Bweleka Chipeta; October 4, 1942; Echiziweni (Timeyo Chipeta village), Mzimba District, Malawi
- Died: June 19, 2019 (aged 76); Karonga District Hospital, Karonga District, Malawi
- Resting place: Katoto Cemetery, Mzuzu, Malawi
- Education: St. John Bosco Teachers Training College
- Occupations: Catholic nun, teacher, humanitarian
- Years active: 1962–2019
- Known for: Founding Lusubilo Orphan Care and Home-Based Care and Village
- Awards: Opus Prize (2010)

Beatrice Chipeta, born Bweleka Chipeta (4 October 1942 – 19 June 2019) was a Malawian Roman Catholic nun, primary school teacher, and humanitarian. She founded the Lusubilo Orphan Care and Home-Based Care and Village in Karonga, a community-based organization supporting orphans and vulnerable populations.

== Early life and education ==
Beatrice was born in Echiziweni (also described as Timeyo Chipeta village), Mzimba District. She was a Tumbuka by ethnicity. Her given name, Bweleka, meant “loan” in Chitumbuka language as she was born after the family had suffered child losses. Her father, Robert Chipeta, was a carpenter, and her mother, Agness Shela, was a nurse. Her father died when she was around two; she was raised communally by her mother's relatives.

She renamed herself Cephas while in primary school, signifying strength. At age 12 she fled to St. Peter's Catholic Full Primary School in Mzuzu to pursue religious life, resisting village elders’ attempts to bring her home for marriage. She was baptized a Catholic on 23 September 1958 and later took her first vows as a Rosarian Sister on 8 December 1962. She completed her teacher training at St. John Bosco Teachers Training College and began teaching in 1964.

== Religious and teaching career ==
Chipeta taught in parishes and schools across Karonga District for nearly three decades before retiring from teaching in 1993 to work with street children. She later studied pastoral counseling in Tanzania.

== Lusubilo Orphan Care and humanitarian work ==
After witnessing the plight of a young street child, Chipeta founded community-based childcare centers (CBCCs) in remote villages. She then established Lusubilo Home-Based Care and Village in 1997 amid the HIV/AIDS crisis.

Lusubilo provided orphan care, nutrition, vocational training, education, and support to families affected by HIV/AIDS; at one point supporting more than 9,000 orphaned children and 800 vulnerable families annually. The organization has been described as “a gift to the people” of Karonga, reaching over 40,000 vulnerable families through local community structures. Catholic Relief Services later partnered with Lusubilo to strengthen its efforts.

== Awards and legacy ==
In 2010, Sister Beatrice was co-awarded the US$1 million Opus Prize, one of the largest faith-based humanitarian awards, shared with Fr. John Halligan of Ecuador.

She has been remembered as a “Mother Teresa of our time” for her humility, kindness, and empathy. A biography, A Gift to the People: Sr. Beatrice Chipeta’s Legacy, was later published to honour her life.

== Death ==
Sister Beatrice died suddenly on 19 June 2019 at Karonga District Hospital after a short illness. She was 76 years old and had served as a nun for 57 years. Her requiem was held at St. Peter's Cathedral, and she was buried on 20 June 2019 at Katoto Cemetery, Mzuzu.

== See also ==
- Opus Prize
- Catholic Church in Malawi
