= Lucy Mtilatila =

Malawian meteorologist

- Other name: Dr. Lucy Mphatso Ng’ombe Mtilatila
- Education: includes: University of Malawi and the University of Potsdam
- Known for: Director of Climate Change and Meteorological Services in Malawi
- Predecessor: Jolamu Nkhokwe

Lucy Mtilatila is a Malawian meteorologist who is the Director of Climate Change and Meteorological Services in Malawi. She is the Permanent Representative of Malawi at the World Meteorological Organization.

== Life ==
Mtilatila graduated from the University of Malawi and she took her masters degree in Australia. She studied for her doctorate in Germany. She defended her doctoral thesis, "Climate change effects on drought, freshwater availability and hydro-power generation in an African environment – observations and projections for the Lake Malawi and Shire River Basins in Malawi" at the University of Potsdam in 2023. She is a Malawian meteorologist who became the Director of Climate Change and Meteorological Services in Malawi in 2022 replacing Jolamu Nkhokwe who retired. She was the fifth director and the first woman. She is the Permanent Representative of Malawi at the World Meteorological Organization.

Her opinion is sought concerning the weather and climate. She has advised farmers to take advise about crops that meet the climatic conditions.

In 2025 Mtilatila gained the support of the relevant parliamentary committee for her ambition to install weather radar in Malawi to improve the accuracy of the weather forecasting.

She was visiting in February 2026 by the World Meteorological Organisation's Secretary-General, Prof. Celeste Saulo. In celebration of the International Day of Women and Girls in Science on 11 February 2026, Saulo interviewed Mtilatila expressing her respect for the work she was doing.
