= Eric Chiwaya =

Malawian politician

Eric Chiwaya, a member of the United Democratic Front, is the urban governor for Blantyre, Malawi. On January 8, 2003, he was stoned by a mob which argued that the government was colluding with vampires. Chiwaya survived the attack and denied the allegations.
