= Chikondi Chabvuta =

Environmental activist

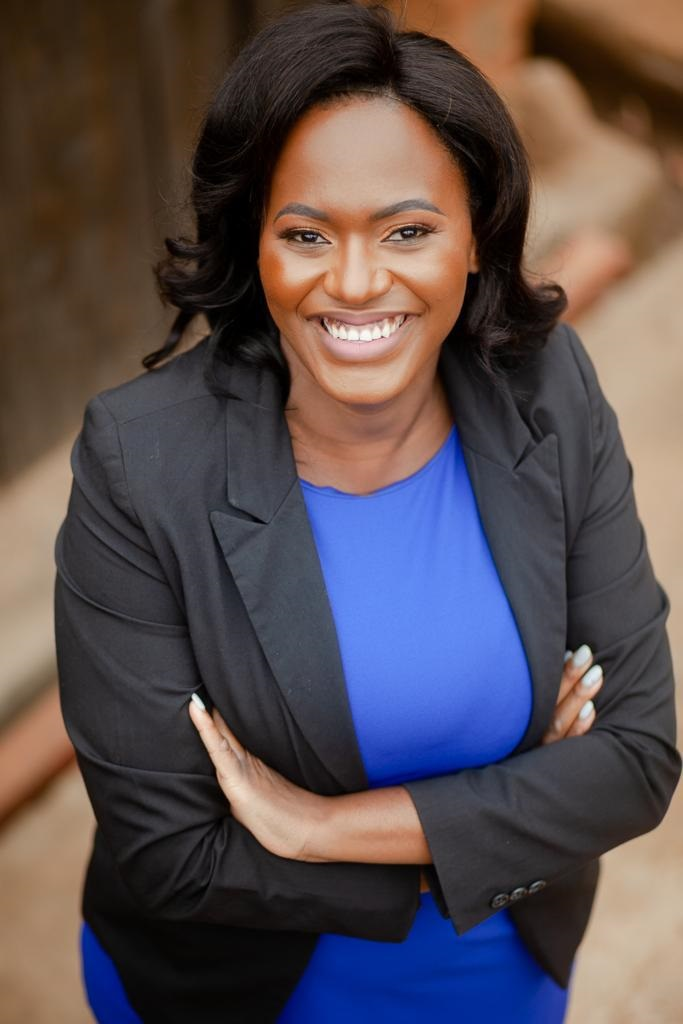
- Born: Malawi
- Education: University of Malawi
- Employer: CARE International
- Known for: Climate and women's rights activism
- Children: 3 (Three) children

Chikondi Chabvuta is a climate justice and women’s rights advocate from Malawi. She is an African Women in Agricultural Research and Development (AWARD) fellow and the Southern African Advocacy Advisor at CARE International.

== Early life and education ==
Chabvuta was born and raised in Malawi, she obtained a B.Sc. in environmental science at the University of Malawi, she also obtained her master's degree in environmental science at the same institution. She was part of the Young African Leaders Initiative (YALI) in its early years. She was recognized as a young African Woman for leadership development by the Moremi Initiative Leadership Empowerment and Development (MILEAD).

== Career ==
Chabvuta is the Southern Africa Region advocacy advisor at CARE International. Prior to this, she has worked on gender justice and climate change for ActionAid and the Farmers Union of Malawi.

She has spoken out about climate justice and gender issues including at the 2021 United Nations Climate Change Conference (COP26) in Glasgow, where she shared her experiences of working with smallholder women farmers in Malawi who are facing a range of extreme weather events that are impacting on their livelihoods. Before she went to COP26 she was in Zimbabwe observing how Cyclone Idai had killed about 1,300 people.

In 2022 she was reporting on floods in her home country that had killed 80 caused by Tropical Storm Ana noting that people were still recovering from the cyclone Idai.

She is a spokesperson on climate issues consulted by The Guardian, The Washington Post and iNews.

The New Statesman quoted her frustration at the end of COP26 when she found that nation's were trying to weaken the final agreed text to minimize the mitigation of climate change.

She has attended several fellowships, mentorship assignments, programs and a fellow for the African Women in Agricultural Research and Development.

== Personal life ==
Chabvuta lives in Malawi and is married with three children.

== Awards and Fellowships ==
- African Women in Agricultural Research & Development (AWARD) fellowship.
- Moremi Initiative Leadership Empowerment and Development (Milead) fellowship.
