= Thokozani Unyolo =

Malawian business executive

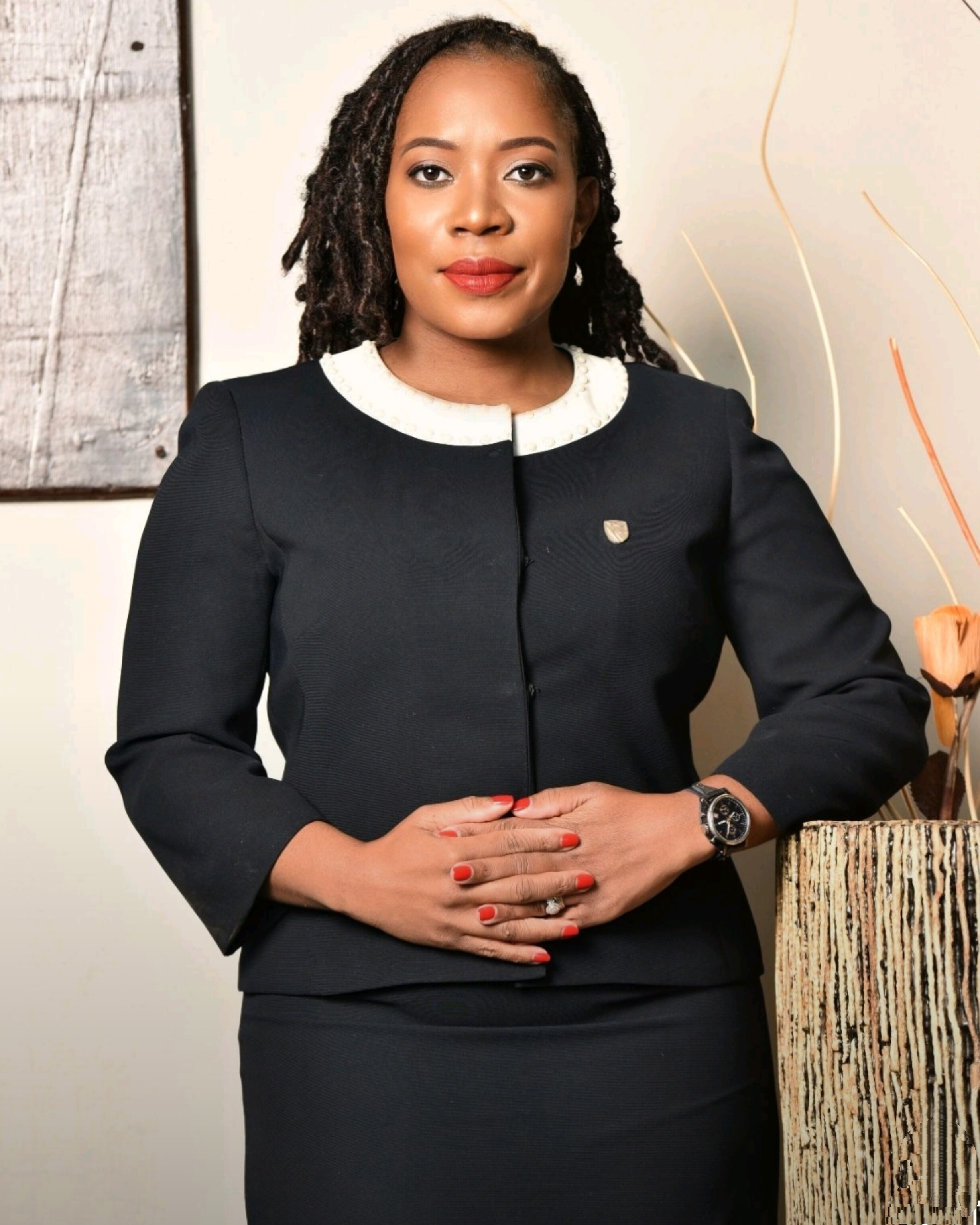
- Unyolo in 2022
- Born: 23 April 1981 (age 45)
- Education: University of Namibia
- Occupation: Business executive
- Employer: Air Cargo Malawi
- Known for: CEO of Air Cargo Malawi; former Head of Marketing, Standard Bank Malawi

Thokozani Unyolo is a Malawian business executive who has been Chief Executive Officer of Air Cargo Malawi since late 2023.

== Biography ==
Unyolo was born on 23 April 1981, the youngest of ten children to Steven Jailosi and Chrissie Mijiga. She graduated in business administration from the University of Namibia, before she went on to take an MBA at Gordon Institute of Business Science in South Africa.

Prior to her tenure at Air Cargo Malawi, Unyolo was Head of Marketing and Communications at Standard Bank Malawi. In May 2015, she oversaw the introduction of deposit-taking ATMs at eleven strategic branches across Malawi. On 2 December 2016, she led the bank's World AIDS Day solidarity display in Lilongwe, organising employees to form a red ribbon and light candles in support of HIV/AIDS awareness under a partnership with the Global Fund. In December 2017, Unyolo received the Marketer of the Year Award by the Chartered Institute of Marketing Malawi, becoming the first woman to receive this accolade at the annual Marketing Excellence Awards in Blantyre.

In 2018 she represented the Bank at Queen Elizabeth Central Hospital in Lilongwe where Operation Smile was carrying out facial surgery on children with cleft plates. The bank contributed significant sums to help cover the costs.

In August 2023, Unyolo was appointed to the Global Marketers' Forum and joined the CMO Council and in early 2024 she became the Chief Executive Officer of Air Cargo Malawi. Her appointment was publicly cheered by Mary Chilima who was the wife of the former vice-president Saulos Chilima.

== Private life ==
Unyolo is married and they have a son.
