= Belinda Gombachika =

Malawian academic

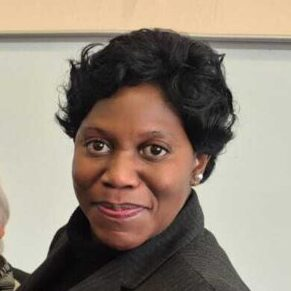
- Gombachika at an SMP meeting in 2025
- Occupation: Academic
- Known for: Deputy vice-chancellor of Kamuzu University of Health Sciences
- Father: Brown Chimphamba

Belinda Thandizo Chimphamba Gombachika is a Malawian academic who became the Deputy Vice-Chancellor for Kamuzu University of Health Sciences in Blantyre.

== Life ==
Gombachika's father was Brown Chimphamba. He had been an academic, a United Nations diplomat and the University of Malawi's vice-chancellor.

She has published scholarly articles including "HIV and Sexual and Reproductive Health for Couples Living with HIV in Rural Southern Malawi" which she, and others, published in 2013.

In 2017, President Peter Mutharika made a number of important appointments. Wandika Phiri became the head of the county's prisons, Mercy Pindani was made the Principal of the Kamuzu College of nursing and Gombachika became the vice-principal. She and Pindani began their new roles in July 2017.

In 2019, the University of Malawi was reassembled. The college where Gombachika had been vice-principal was merged with the college of Medicine to create a new university. The Kamuzu University of Health Sciences was based in Blantyre, with the President as vice-chancellor.

In March 2023, President Lazarus Chakwera made Gombachika the new Deputy Vice-Chancellor of Kamuzu University of Health Sciences
