= Mzuzu University =

University in Mzuzu, Malawi

- Mzuni logo
- Motto: Self Reliance, Perfection and Service
- Type: Public
- Established: 1997
- Chairman: Rev. Reynold Mmangisa
- Chancellor: Peter Mutharika
- Vice-Chancellor: Wales Singini
- Students: 8,500 (2021)
- Location: Mzuzu, Malawi; 11.422°S 33.993°E
- Campus: Suburban
- Colours: Green
- Nickname: Mzuni
- Website: mzuni.ac.mw

Mzuzu University (Tumbuka: Yunivesite ya Mzuzu) is a public university in Malawi. The university is located in Luwinga, Mzuzu City, in the northern region of Malawi.

== History ==
The university was founded in 1997 after being transformed from a teachers training college established in the 1970s. It accepted its first students in 1999. At the time the university opened its doors, the Chancellor was Malawi's former president Bakili Muluzi and the first Vice-Chancellor was Professor Terrence Davis.

Professor Peter Mwanza, who later entered politics and became a cabinet minister, was active in establishing the university. He was Chairman of the University Council, and later Vice-Chancellor.

Robert Ridley was the vice chancellor. He defended a proposed rise in fees at Mzuzu University after student protests in 2016. In 2018 he left Mzuzu as he was appointed as the deputy vice chancellor at the Unicaf University's campus in Lilongwe.

== Academics ==
MZUNI is a dual mode University. The ODeL Centre offers courses through face-to face and open, distance and e-learning modes. Some of these programmes are available on block, week-end and vacation release.

=== Faculties and departments ===
The University consists of the following faculties and departments:

- Faculty of Education
  - Educational Foundations
  - Teaching, Learning and Curriculum Studies
  - Inclusive Education
- Faculty of Environmental Science
  - Agri-Sciences
  - Built Environment
  - Fisheries and Aquatic Science
  - Forestry and Environmental Management
  - Geo-Science
  - Water Resources Management
- Faculty of Health Sciences
  - Biomedical Sciences
  - Nursing and Midwifery
  - Optometry

Faculty of Humanities and Social Science

  - Language, Cultural and Creative Studies
  - Communication Studies
  - Theology and Religious Studies
  - History and Heritage Studies
  - Information Science
  - Governance, Peace, and Security Studies
- Faculty of Science, Technology and Innovation
  - Mathematics and Statistics *(in English) Mzuzu University mathematics department
  - Physics and Electronics
  - Biological Sciences
  - Renewable Energy Technologies
  - Chemistry
  - Information and Communication Technology
- Faculty of Tourism, Hospitality and Management Studies
  - Tourism
  - Hospitality Management
  - Management and Entrepreneurial Studies

The Mzuzu Open and Distance Learning (ODL) campus centre is the focal point for providing education off-campus, including continuing education.

Undergraduate Programmes

Faculty of Education

Bachelor of Education (Languages)

Bachelor of Education (Arts)

Bachelor of Education (Science)

Bachelor of Education (Information Communication Technology)

Faculty of Humanities and Social Sciences

Bachelor of Arts Communication Studies

Bachelor of Arts (Theology and Religious Studies)

Bachelor of Arts Library and Information Science

Bachelor of Arts Security Studies

Bachelor of Arts Politics and Governance

Bachelor of Arts Development Studies

Bachelor of Arts International Relations and Diplomacy

Bachelor of Arts (History and Heritage Studies)

Faculty of Health Sciences

Bachelor of Science (Biomedical Sciences)

Bachelor of Science (Optometry)

Bachelor of Science (Nursing and Midwifery)

=== Open and Distance Learning Centre ===
The Open and Distance Learning Centre at the university was opened in 2006 and enrolled its first group of students in 2011. Interest in Open and Distance e-Learning (ODeL) is growing in Southern Africa. This mode is increasingly seen as an alternative route to for Malawi citizens to access higher education. The National Council for Higher Education administers access to six institutions with their public universities selection (PUS) process. ODeL offers school leavers and mature students an alternative route to access and enter into tertiary studies. The ODeL unit has five satellite ODeL centers. They are located in Mzuzu, Lilongwe, Balaka, Mulanje and Karonga. Other public universities have followed MZUNI’s lead. For example, in 2016, Lilongwe University of Agriculture and Natural Resources (LUANAR) established an ODL unit on their campus.

=== Research ===
The school operates the following research centres:

- Centre of Excellence in Water and Sanitation
- The Test and Training Centre for Renewable Energy Technologies (TCRET)
- Centre for Inclusive Education
- Malawi eHealth Research Centre (MERC)

== Notable people associated with Mzuzu University ==
=== Notable Alumni ===
- Rachel Sibande Technology expert and computer scientist
- Tonthoza Uganja Ecopreneur, agroforestry expert and environmental researcher.

== See also ==
- List of universities in Malawi
- Education in Malawi
