= Malawi Police Service =

National police force

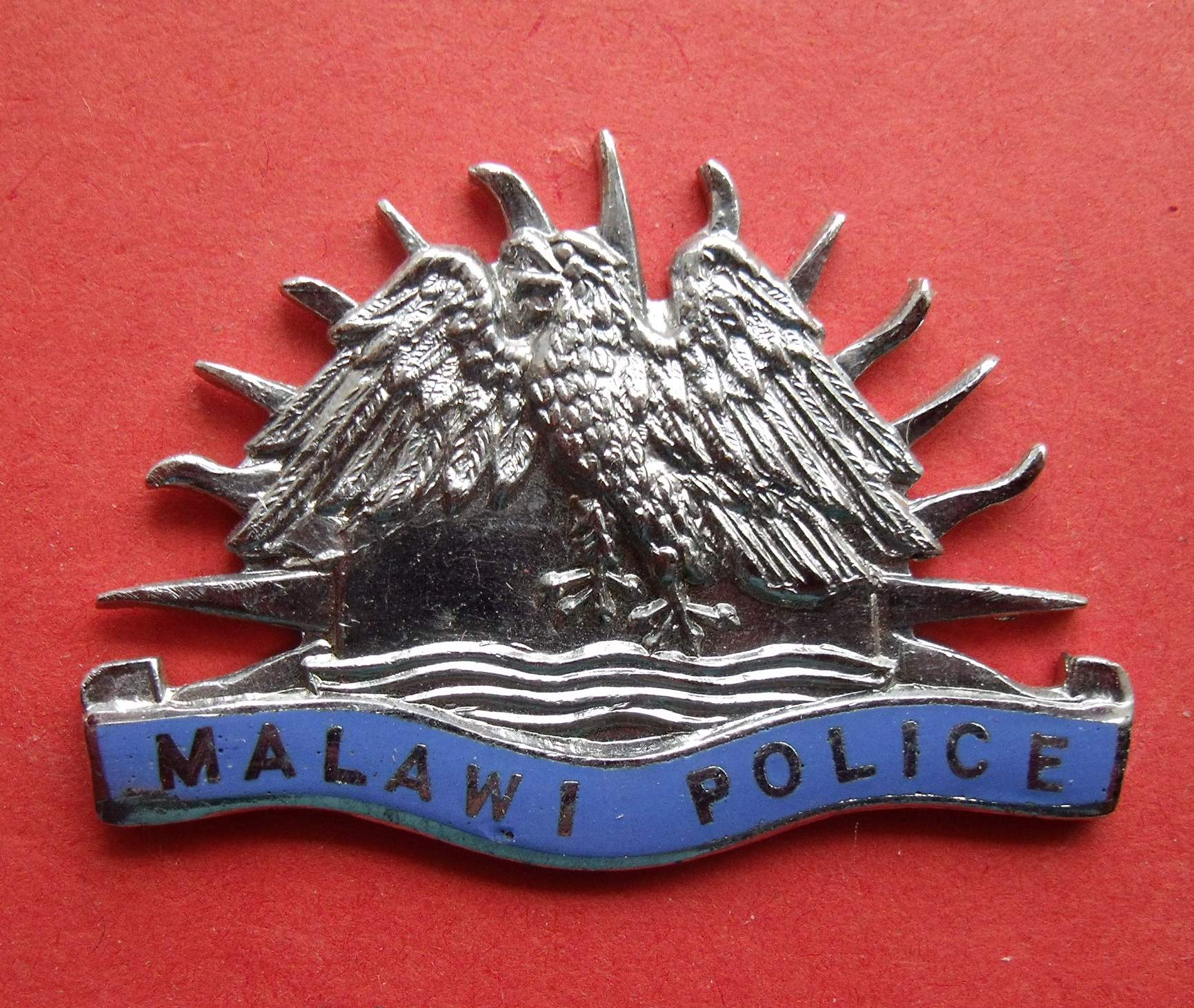
- Common name: Malawi Police
- Abbreviation: MPS
- Motto: Creating a Safe and Secure Malawi

Agency overview
- Formed: 1921
- Preceding agency: Nyasaland Police Force

Jurisdictional structure
- Operations jurisdiction: MW
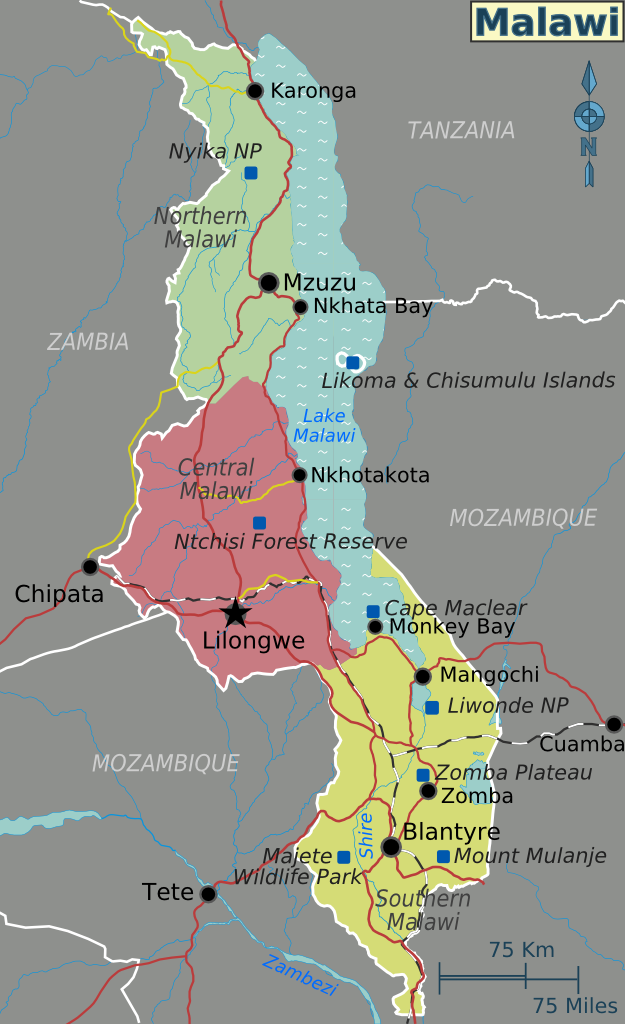
- Map of Malawi showing Malawi Police Service Jurisdiction
- Area: 118,484 square kilometres (45,747 sq mi)
- Population: 21,196,629
- Legal jurisdiction: Malawi
- Governing body: Ministry of Homeland Security
- General nature: Civilian police

Operational structure
- Headquarters: Malawi National Police Headquarters Area 30, Lilongwe, Lilongwe 3, Malawi.
- Police Officers: <14,500
- Agency executive: Richard Luhanga, Inspector General of Police
- Parent agency: Malawi Ministry of Homeland Security
- Branches: List: • Investigations Department; • Community Policing Department; • Criminal Investigations Department; • Road Safety and Traffic Services; • Marine Police; • Airport Police; • Police Mobile Services; • Human Resource Management and Development; • Information and Communications Technology; • Research and Planning; • Prosecutions; • Public Relations, Press and Publications; • Support Branches
- Regions: List: • Northern; • Central; • Southern; • Eastern; •Central East; •South East

Website
- www.police.gov.mw

The Malawi Police Service is an independent organ of the executive that is mandated by the constitution to protect public safety and the rights of persons in Malawi. The Malawi Police Service is overseen by an Inspector General of Police.

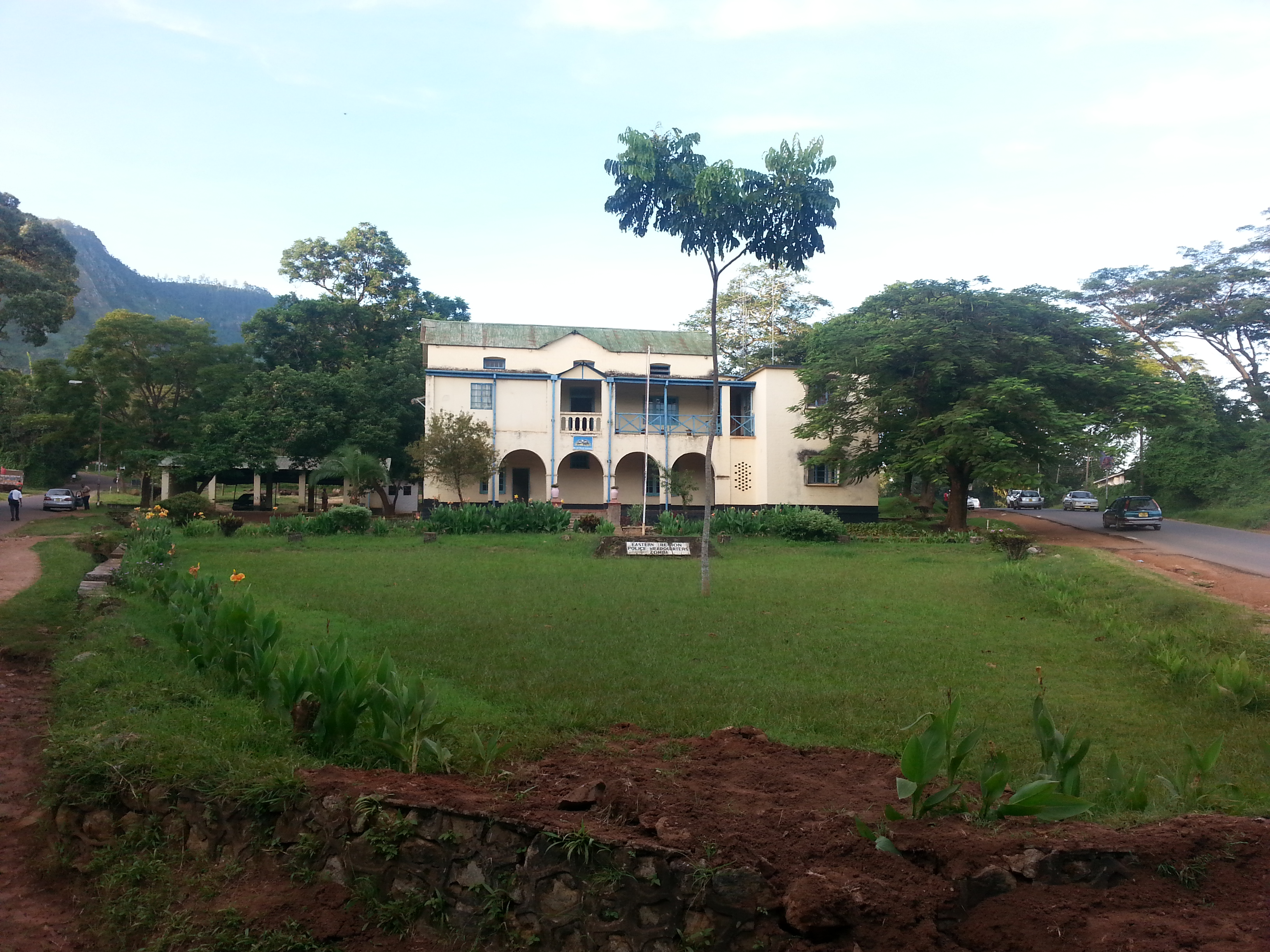
The Eastern Region Police Headquarters, Zomba

== Police Ranks ==
- Inspector General
- Deputy Inspector General
- Commissioner
- Deputy Commissioner
- Assistant Commissioner
- Senior Superintendent
- Superintendent
- Assistant Superintendent
- Inspector
- Sub Inspector
- Sergeant
- Constable

== Inspector General ==
The Inspector General is the head of the Malawi Police Service. The position is appointed by the President of Malawi and confirmed by the National Assembly. The Public Appointments Committee may at any time inquire as to the competence of the person. The Inspector General of Police can only serve for five years in that position. The Inspector General of Police can be removed by the president for being incompetent, incapacitated, compromised, or reaching retirement age. The Inspector General oversees the Malawi Police Service (MPS) under Ministry of Internal Affairs and Public Security. The Inspector General is assisted by a Deputy and two commissioners who run the administration and operations respectively. The current Inspector General is remembered for strengthening MPS by establishing two new policing regions, that is, Central East and South East.

Inspector generals:

IGP	Deputy IGP	Years in Office	Administration
Mr Richard Luhanga	Noel Kayira	2025 to Date	Peter Mutharika
Mrs Merlyne Yolamu	Happy Mkandawire	2022 to 2025	Lazarus Chakwera
Mr George Kainja	Merlyne Yolamu	2020 to 2022	Lazarus Chakwera
Mr Duncan Mwapasa	xx	2019-2020	Peter Mutharika
Mr Rodney Jose	xx	2018-2019	Peter Mutharika
Dr Lexten Shame Kachama	Duncan Mwapasa	2016- 2018	Peter Mutharika
Mr Paul Rodrick Kanyama	Lexten Kachama	2015- 2016	Peter Mutharika
Mr Lot T.P Dzonzi	Nelson Bophani	2012–2015	Joyce Banda
Mr Peter M Mukhito	x	2009 - 2012	Bingu wa Mutharika
Mr Oliver Mathews Cedric Kumbambe	x	2006-2009	Bingu wa Mutharika
Mrs Mary Nangwale	x	2004 - 2006	Bingu wa Mutharika
Joseph Ellywn Aironi	x	2001-2004	Bakili Muluzi
Mr Lawrence Chimwaza	x	2000-2001	Bakili Muluzi
Mr Bernard B. Mphinji	x	2000-2000	Bakili Muluzi
Mr Kennedy S.M Chirambo	x	1999-2000	Bakili Muluzi
Mr Patrick Chikapa	x	1995-1999	Bakili Muluzi
Mr Feyani Morrison Chikosa	x	1994-1995	Bakili Muluzi
Mcwilliam Lunguzi	x	1990-1994	Kamuzu Banda, Bakili Muluzi
Mr Milward Gibson Namasani	x	1988-1990	Kamuzu Banda
Mr Elliot Fanuel MBedza	x	1987-1988	Kamuzu Banda
Mc Lywell Ezron Ngwata	x	1987-1987	Kamuzu Banda
Mr John Kamwana	x	1981-1987	Kamuzu Banda

== Societal Impact ==
During the Hastings Banda regime the police were involved in suppressing dissent. After the 8 March 1992 pastoral letter:

There were public demonstrations in support of the bishops - notably at the University in Blantyre and Zomba, where soldiers indicated their support for the students and deterred violent police action against the protesters. This was the first sign of the army's future political role. In May 1992 student protesters were joined by striking workers in Blantyre. In two days of riots dozens of protesters were killed by armed police and Young Pioneers.

The capabilities of the Malawi Police Service are growing, but its abilities to deter and investigate crimes, assist victims, and apprehend criminals are extremely limited. The police lack basic equipment (particularly transportation), are poorly funded, and do not receive sufficient training. Public support for the police has continued to drop, due in part to alleged corruption and ineffectiveness in deterring criminal activity.
