= Peter Mukhito =

Peter Mukhito Is the Malawi’s minister of Homeland Security since October 2025, he is also the secretary general of the Democratic Progressive Party (DPP) and a former Inspector General of Police in Malawi.

== Life ==
Mukhito comes from Chiradzulu District. He has gained notoriety for his involvement in interrogating Blessings Chinsinga which began the stand off for academic freedom in Malawi between Chinsinga and President Bingu wa Mutharika. He was also involved in the investigation in the death of Robert Chasowa. Mukhito was also the Inspector General during the 2011 Malawian national protest against President Bingu wa Mutharika, that saw 19 Malawians killed.

Mukhito was President Joyce Banda's first replacement on April 7, 2012 and he was replaced by Loti Dzonzi.

He became Malawi’s minister of Homeland Security in October 2025.

Political offices
Preceded by *	Inspector Generals of Malawi; 2004–2012	Succeeded by Loti Dzonzi
