= 2012 Malawian constitutional crisis =

The 2012 Malawian constitutional crisis occurred from April 5, 2012 - April 7, 2012 after senior members of the Democratic Progressive Party-led cabinet failed to notify the public of the death of the sitting president, Bingu wa Mutharika on April 5. Instead, cabinet ministers held a series of meetings in Lilongwe, Malawi without vice-president Joyce Banda with the aim of undermining the constitution and Banda's succession to Presidency. News confirming his death had, however, quickly spread across the country (and to the Malawian diaspora) through word of mouth, cellphone text messages, Malawian bloggers, Twitter, Facebook, and on listservs by the end of the day on April 5, 2012. Therefore, the failure to announce his death resulted in speculation over the real health of the president and over whether the succession procedures would be followed as outlined in the constitution. According to the constitution, the vice-president takes over but there had been no official word on a successor or communication with the vice-president. Amidst growing speculation, the Cabinet announced that the president's brother, Peter Mutharika, the foreign minister, was the new President of the party on April 6. The Cabinet only announced his death two days after his death, after which Banda became Malawi's first female President.

== Background ==
President Bingu wa Mutharika had increasingly begun to consolidate his power during his second term. He groomed his brother, Peter Mutharika, a lawyer and the Minister of Foreign Affairs as his successor. This meant that he by-passed his sitting Vice President, Joyce Banda but expected her to support this bid. Instead, wa Mutharika caused factions within his Democratic Progressive Party and fired Banda and Second Vice President Khumbo Kachali from their positions in the government and the party in 2010. According to the Constitution of Malawi, however, a vice president has to be removed through an impeachment process requiring a majority of the National Assembly. Therefore, the Malawi court declared this act unconstitutional. The court declared that he could fire Banda from his party but not from the government because the removal process for these positions were different. A party vice president can be removed in accordance with that party's internal process. However, a vice president, who is voted in with the presidential position, can only be removed through a legally sanctioned impeachment process. As such, Banda was regarded as the legal vice president even though she was also not vice president of the DPP party. Mutharika knew that he would not garner the majority in parliament due to factions within the party over the succession of the presidency and therefore he proceeded to frustrate Banda in order to force her to resign as Vice President. She refused to resign and continued in her capacity as vice president of the country, although under constant duress and harassment. Her security detail was changed and several of her privileges were redirected to Mutharika's brother Peter. Banda then formed a new political party, the People's Party, in 2011.

=== Constitution ===
According to section 83, subsection 4 of Malawi's constitution, "whenever there is a vacancy in the office of President, the First Vice-President shall assume that office for the remainder of the term and shall appoint another person to serve as First Vice-President for the remainder of the term."

== Crisis in detail ==
=== Thursday, April 5 ===
President Mutharika had private meetings with Member of Parliament Patricia Kaliati and later Lilongwe legislator Agnes Penemulungu. He died of a heart attack during the meeting with Penemulungu and was declared dead on arrival at the local hospital. Senior members of the Democratic Progressive Party-led cabinet did not notify the public of the death of the President from a heart attack. However, news confirming his death spread quickly across the country (and to the Malawian diaspora) through word-of-mouth, cellphone text messages, Malawian bloggers, Twitter, Facebook, and on listeners throughout the day. An online newspaper, the Malawian Democrat, first broke the news to the public. An online journalist, Andrew Evans, from National Geographic used Twitter to confirm reports and broke the news to international press. News of the possibility of a cover-up began to spread throughout the country and abroad. The Malawian army switched its security detail and went to the home of Vice President Joyce Banda in order to protect her in accordance with the constitution of Malawi. Extra police were deployed to the streets as a precautionary measure.

The initial emergency meetings took place at the residence of the vice president of the party, Goodall Gondwe. The ministers present included Ken Lipenga, Catherine Gotani Hara, and Peter Mutharika, but it is largely unclear who supported the events and who opposed it since this was not a unanimous decision. It is known that Mutharika accepted his nomination as the DPP president. Henry Mussa noted that many other ministers were involved in the plot other than the six that appeared on television. Many of the ministers have since distanced themselves from the event. The Malawi Law Society called for a full investigation into the matter.

=== Friday, April 6 ===
Senior government officials made statements to the media that the President was not well and was being flown to South Africa but no official announcements were made. Vice President Joyce Banda thereafter informed the nation that President Mutharika was unwell and that she had contacted South Africa about the President’s condition. She also informed the nation that if he became incapacitated that the Constitution would take its course. Amidst growing speculation, the cabinet announced that the president's brother, Peter Mutharika, the foreign minister, would be the new President of the DPP.

Senior members of the cabinet led by Patricia Kaliati, Minister of Information, appeared on television and announced that the president was not well and that the country would be updated on his health. They further stated that Vice President Banda was ineligible to succeed Mutharika because she had formed her own political party.

==== The Midnight Six ====
The Midnight Six is the term used to refer to the cabinet Ministers that were involved and who appeared on television at midnight:

- Patricia Kaliati, Minister of Information and Civic Education.
- Henry Mussa, Minister of local Government.
- Dr. Jean Kalilani, Minister of Health
- Simon Vuwa Kaunda, Minister of Sports
- Nicholas Dausi, Deputy Minister in the Office of the President
- Kondwani Nakhumwa, Deputy Minister of foreign Affairs.

There is debate on whether or not the involvement of these six will lead to legal prosecution for attempted treason.

=== Saturday, April 7 ===
The Malawi News printed a headline entitled, "Bingu Dead". The senior members of the government thereafter announced President Mutharika's death. Vice President Joyce Banda was thus sworn in as President. Catherine Gotani Hara announced in a radio interview on Radio zodiak that there had been an attempt at circumventing the constitution since April 5, when the president had actually died. She noted that Peter Mutharika, an internationally renowned constitutional lawyer, had not been following the proper constitutional process.

== International reaction ==
The US, one of Malawi's donors, expressed alarm at the official silence and said it was confident that the constitution would be upheld and came out in support of Banda. The constitutional succession has a direct impact on donor funding in Malawi. Keith Somerville, a career journalist with the BBC and visiting lecturer at the University of Kent, described Malawi's international financial crisis: "Britain is Malawi's main bilateral donor and was expected to provide aid worth £90m in 2011, before the rupture in relations. The German government halved its budget support contribution in 2011 and the US government's Millennium Challenge Corporation is withholding a 350 million dollar grant to rehabilitate Malawi's failing energy network. Donor aid accounts for 40 per cent of Malawi's national budget. The US government has already put out a positive statement saying, 'By following constitutional procedures for this transition, the government and people of Malawi have reaffirmed their commitment to democratic principles ...We stand with the people of Malawi during their time of mourning, and look forward to deepening the partnership between our nations.'"

== Aftermath ==
In January 2013, a commission of inquiry published a 90-page report about the events surrounding Mutharika's death. On March 10, the police began arresting the Midnight Six and others allegedly involved. This included Midnight Six members Patricia Kaliati, Henry Mussa, and Kondwani Nankhumwa. It also included Peter Mutharika (President Mutharika's brother), Goodall Gondwe, the Minister of Economic Development, and the Chief Secretary, Bright Msaka. The arrests sparked protest from DPP supporters in Blantyre who smashed cars and destroyed property. The crowds were dispersed through tear gas. By March 13, twelve top officials had been arrested, this included ex-ministers Henry Mussa, Symon Vuwa Kaunda, Jean Kalirani, Patricia Kaliati, Kondwani Nankhumwa, the Deputy Chief Secretary to the Government, Necton Mhura and Duncan Mwapasa.
