= Trestle Theatre =

Theatre company in England

Trestle Theatre Company
- Type: Theatre Company
- Purpose: Mask and physical theatre both professionally and in the community
- Location: Trestle Arts Base, Russet Drive, St Albans, Hertfordshire, England, AL4 0JQ
- Website: Official website

Trestle Theatre Company is a professional theatre company specialising in mask and physical theatre. Currently based in a renovated chapel in the city of St Albans in the county of Hertfordshire, England. The company creates its own masks, performances, workshops and training, sending the masks nationally and internationally.

== History ==
=== Beginnings ===
Trestle Theatre Company was founded in 1981 by Sally Cook, Alan Riley and Toby Wilsher, three graduates from the BA Performance Arts course of Middlesex Polytechnic, and the support of John Wright, their course leader. Their initial plan was to tour the country with a pop-up trestle stage at markets and local fairs, following the blueprints of many internationally renowned Commedia Dell'Arte groups (hence the name trestle). However, this mode of performance proved impractical, but the name stuck to symbolize the group's original ambitions. Joined later by Joff Chafer, the company continued to tour nationally, and eventually internationally, and develop its distinctive story telling style: combining mask, physical theatre and puppetry.

=== Touring ===
Trestle's strength came from its touring work; not just touring festivals and theatres nationally, but travelling internationally, visiting 17 countries in the first 10 years. Trestle's first few shows were produced in full helmet mask, most successful were the trilogy of shows looking at the trials of growing up: Crèche, School Rules and nd Hanging Arou mr sally also went for a picnick and thought about another play (later all three were to be all included under the name Hanging Around) and had several revivals, touring for 12 years after their initial production. Trestle's touring has continued beyond the early nineties, the majority of the shows visiting the width and breadth of the nation, and continuing their ambition to tour internationally, adding countries such as Uzbekistan, America, Canada, Ecuador and most recently touring an adaptation of Hans Christian Andersen's [The Snow Queen] around India.

=== Trestle Arts Base ===
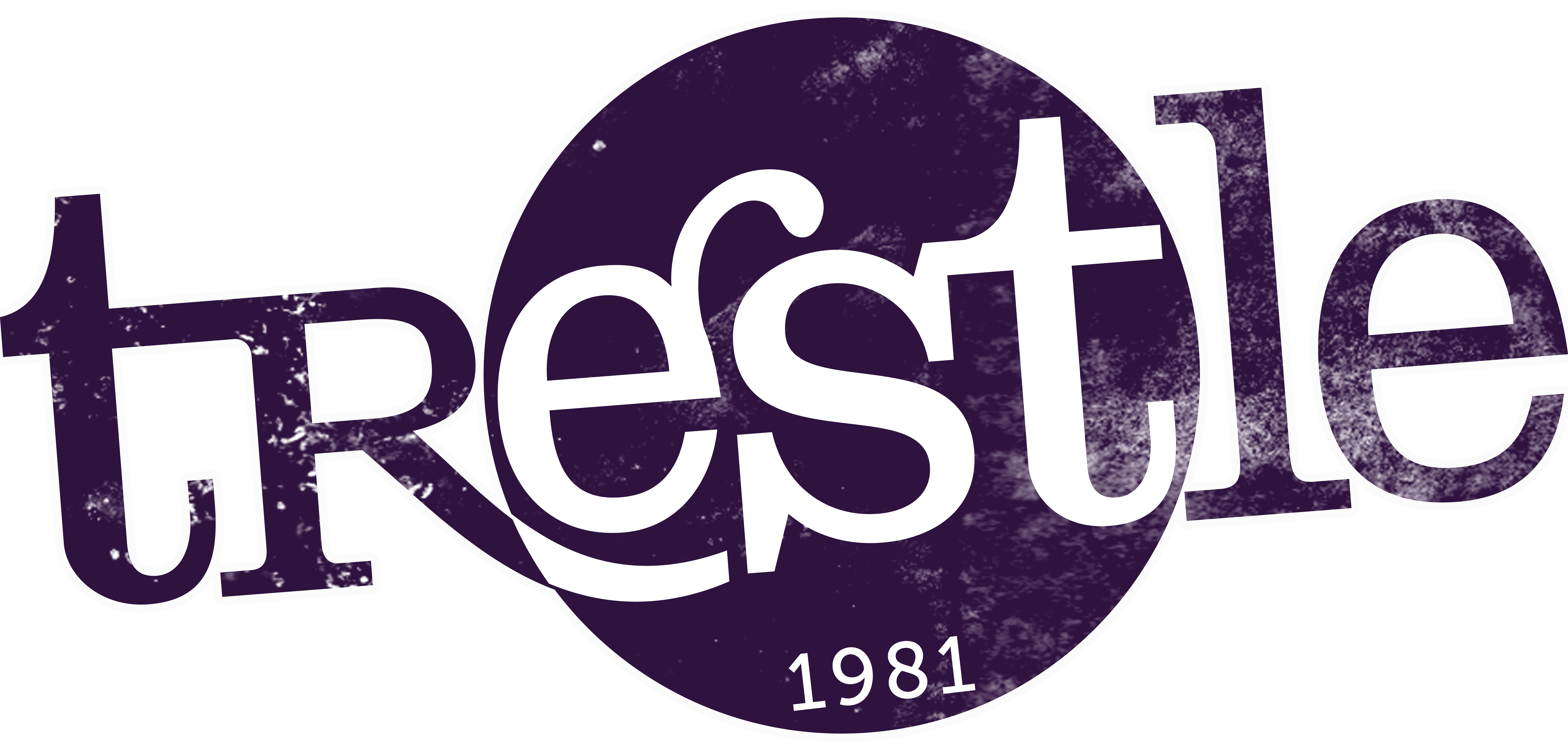
Trestle's new logo, produced in 2012

In April 2002 the touring company set up home in the Hill End Hospital Chapel, a refurbished chapel of the old psychiatric hospital and one of 4 buildings designed suitable for continued use. In 2004 artistic director, and founding member, Toby Wilsher left Trestle Theatre to work as a freelance director and writer and Emily Gray was placed in the role. Since the new directorship, Trestle have continued to evolve their physical storytelling techniques past mask work in an effort to expand their repertoire and establish themselves within their new venue.
Between 2007 and 2009 Trestle collaborated with three international companies to share techniques:

- Little India; working with theatre company Little Jasmine Productions the residency culminated in a performance based on a story from the Mahabharata. The process concentrated on rhythm techniques, Mudras, Vedic chants and the Raga system of emotions and how they're used in performance. Work from this residency was later used as inspiration for the production The Snow Queen, produced by The Unicorn Theatre.
- Lola: the life of Lola Montes; Working with Spanish dance company Increpación Danza Trestle worked on flamenco skills to produce the show which fused theatre, dance and live music, telling the story of the infamous 19th century dancer, Lola Montez. Work and training with Increpación continued to produce a second show, an adaptation of Oscar Wilde's Birthday of the Infanta, in association with The Unicorn Theatre.
- The Glass Mountain; working with Polish practitioners from companies such as Piesn Kozwa and Gardenizia to explore physical and vocal techniques, specifically the singing-storytelling technique: the technique of combining physicality, voice, text and song. This collaboration inspired the second production Moon Fool; ill met by moonlight.

=== Partnerships ===
Trestle Theatre Company have worked in artistic partnership with several companies and organisations such as:

- York Theatre Royal - York Theatre Royal is a grade II* listed building over 250 years old. Working mainly as a producing house in their two auditoriums, the York Theatre Royal also has a dedicated education and taking part department. Alongside Trestle Theatre Company they are working on a project called On Our Turf, a project which brings theatre and the arts to smaller market towns across Yorkshire.
- Small Nose Productions - Small Nose are a theatre company that work in clowning and mask work, producing shows (most recently in 2013 an adaptation of Aesop's Fables) and supportive workshops.
- VIDEOfeet - VIDEOfeet work with film, graphic design, illustration, sound design and web design. Based in St Albans they have collaborated with Trestle Theatre for work on their website and trailers for some of their previous productions.

== Productions ==
=== Recent productions ===
- The Rachel Project. Trestle teamed up with Small nose production to share the story of Mrs Rachel Lewy. Funded by Arts Council England and Lewisham Council. 2018-2020
- Hertfordshire's Hidden Heroines. Funded by the Heritage Lottery Communities Fund, 2016.
- Yarico The Musical. Developed by Carl Miller and directed by Emily Gray. Played at the London Theatre Workshop from February to March 2015.
- The Deadlies. Directed by Emily Gray. March – May 2014, UK
- The Snow Queen. Written by Anupama Chandreshekar, Directed by Rosamunde Hutt; Unicorn Theatre: 23 November 2011 - 8 January 2012. India Tour: August 2012. UK Tour: April–June 2013.
- The Man With The Luggage. Written by Lizzie Nunnery. UK Tour: 21 September - 10 December 2011
- The Birthday of the Infanta. Written by Oscar Wilde, adapted by Carl Miller . UK Tour: 2 March - 5 May 2011, and 22 December 2011 at Trestle Arts Base.
- Moon Fool revamp Ill Met By Moonlight Based on A Midsummer Night's Dream by William Shakespeare, produced by Moon Fool. Trestle Arts Base: 28 February-17 March 2011.
- Burn My Heart. In collaboration Blindeye, novel written by Beverley Naidoo, adapted by Rina Vergano. UK tour: 21 September - 13 November 2010.
- Twelve Fifteen Written by Anna Reynolds. Trestle Arts Base: 24–25 July 2010.
- Moon Fool – Ill Met by Moonlight. Based on A Midsummer Night's Dream by William Shakespeare, produced by Trestle Theatre and created by Moon Fool. UK tour: 3 February - 17 April 2010.
- The Glass Mountain (Szklana Góra). Written by Anna Reynolds. UK Tour: 24 September - 14 November 2009.
- Lola: the life of Lola Montez. Written by Esther Richardson in collaboration with Emily Gray, Ricardo Garcia, Ramón Baeza and Montse Sánchez. UK tour: 17 September 2008 - 1 April 2009. New Town Theatre, Edinburgh, Edinburgh Fringe: 9–30 August 2009.
- Little India. Written by Nina Patel and Anna Reynolds. UK tour: 27 September – 10 November 2007.
- Beyond Midnight. Written by Diane Samuels. 3 August - 25 November 2005.
- The Smallest Person. Written by Timothy Knapman. 4 August - 4 December 2004.
- Tonight We Fly: The Story of Mark Chagall . Written by Darren Tunstall in collaboration with Toby Wilsher. UK tour: 14 August - 24 October 2003; January - April 2004.
- The Adventures of the Stoneheads Written by Toby Wilsher. 28 June 2002 – 1 March 2003.

=== Significant earlier productions ===
- Crèche / School Rules / Hanging Around. 8–22 October 1983. A series of humorous sketches produced in full helmet masks, looking at young people. From children in a playgroup to a group of unemployed punks. Together, these three could be considered almost as a triptych looking at the hardships of growing up. These three shows later went on to tour internationally over 10 years.

== Services ==
=== Trestle Masks ===
In the early 1990s Trestle gained funding from the Lindbury Trust to produce a set of masks for distribution to encourage individuals and communities to engage with this new take on mask theatre.

=== Workshops and school work ===
Alongside the masks, Trestle also provides workshops in both mask and physical theatre, and can be booked for commercial business training and team building. With drama facilitators across the country Trestle aims to be able to bring workshops to schools and theatre companies; Trestle Theatre Company also runs INSET days at the Arts Base for teachers and facilitators to attend and engage their skills.

=== Facilities ===
Trestle Arts Base has the following facilities:

- 125-seat theatre.
- Mirrored dance studio space
- Front of house meeting/rehearsal space
- Cafe/Bar

All spaces are fully accessible to any disabilities.

Regular community arts group at Trestle Arts Base include:

- Trestle School of Drama: drama groups for all ages
- Story Tent - Story telling that incorporates stories, song and arts & crafts for young children
- The Dance Studio - dance training for young people aged 12 months to 18.

=== Outreach Projects ===
Trestle's School of Drama runs weekly drama sessions for ages 4–18. Additionally, Trestle's community inclusive groups run weekly Dance Now, Sing out, Act Up sessions that encourage engagement for participants with all abilities. All groups are funded by Neighbourly Charitable Trust, Herts Community Foundation and Councillor Dreda Gordon Locality Grant. Trestle also conducts a wellbeing workshop (M-ask]) using theatre techniques for young people in partnership with Dacorum Borough Council, MIND in Mid Herts and the Herts Community Foundation.
