= Maggie Kathewera Banda =

Maggie Banda
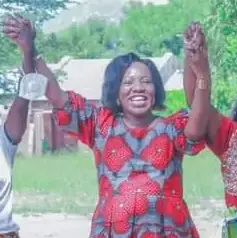
- Banda in 2023
- Born: 15 March 1975 (age 51); Mulanje, Southern Region, Malawi
- Education: University of Malawi
- Occupation: Activist
- Known for: Executive director of the Women Legal Resource Center

Maggie Kathewera Banda (born 15 March 1975) is a Malawian women's rights and gender equity activist. She is the executive director of the Women Legal Resource Centre (WOLREC) and Chairperson of the Non‑Governmental Organisations Gender Coordinating Network (NGO‑GCN). Banda was declared Human Rights Defender of the Year in December 2025.

== Life ==
Banda was born in 1975 in Mulanje, but her parents, Allan and Ellinah Chipasula, moved to Blantyre when she was two. Her mother had been a teacher in Mulange and the father was studying for a master's degree in Canada. She graduated from Chancellor College (University of Malawi) with a degree in Social Science.

In 2006, she founded and led an NGO called the Women's Legal Resource Center. It is based in Blantyre and it's concerned with women's rights.

In 2012, she completed a post graduate course at the University of London in managing an NGO.

In 2020, she was at Malawi's Human Rights Resource Centre, where the CEO Emma Kaliya was calling for more progress. Banda noted that Malawi had made progress in creating laws to encourage better gender equality, however the effect was not strong. In the same year, the Minister of Gender, Patricia Kaliati, went on her knees in public to thank the women who had inspired her. She named Banda as well as Faustace Chirwa, Margaret Ali, Emmie Chanika, Emma Kaliya, Reen Kachere, Mercy Timba, and Jean Nkwanda for making her ambitious.

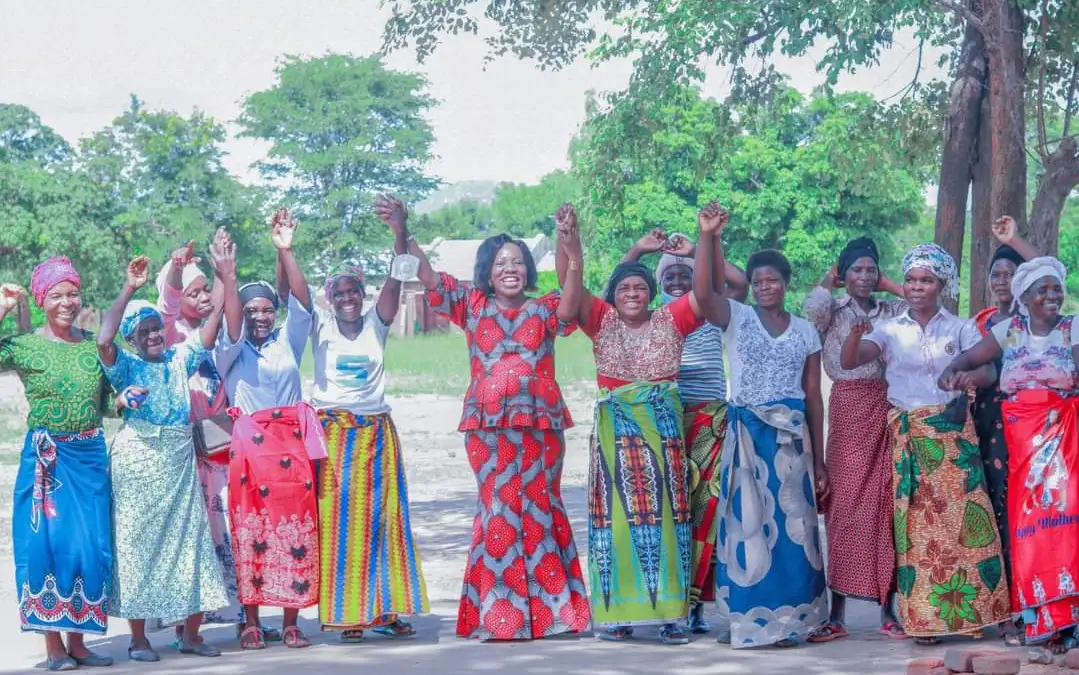
Banda and the Women's Legal Resource Center celebrating funding in 2023

In 2023, the Women's Legal Resource Center was awarded substantial funds from the British government. In the same year she was elected to lead the Non-Governmental Organisations-Gender Coordinating Network (NGO-GCN). The organisation had been founded in 1998 and she took over from Barbara Banda who had led the network since 2018. As Chairperson of NGO‑GCN, she called for affirmative action and media engagement to boost women's political participation ahead of the Malawi 2025 elections.

In May 2025, she chaired a meeting in Lilongwe sponsored by the African Women Advancing Rights and Empowerment (AWARE) project to look at why women are not more engaged with politics. 2025 was an election year and Banda was encouraging young people to take part in the election. She conceded that politics did not always go well but hope should remain and registering to vote was the start. In June she was at the event where the second edition of the Women's Manifesto was released. It had been created with the financial support of the UK Government's Foreign and Commonwealth Development programme and OXFAM. It was reinforced by the support of the UK's commissioner Fiona Ritchie, Grace Naledi Pandor of South Africa and the EU's ambassador Rune Skinnebach.

After the election she noted that despite efforts the percentage of women parliamentarians was just over 20%.

Banda was declared Human Rights Defender of the Year in December 2025 at an event at the Grand Palace Hotel in Mzuzu as part of Human Rights Day. The runner up was Silvester Namiwa.

In 2026, the Women's National Football Team made an amazing debut at the Africa Cup of Nations. Banda used the example to encourage Malawian women to have more self-belief and ambition.
