= Gibo Pearson =

Malawian secular musician

Giboh Pearson
- Born: Gift Pearson; August 29, 1997 (age 29); Phalombe District, Malaŵi
- Origin: Phalombe, Malaŵi
- Genres: Afrobeat, Amapiano, Local Malawian music
- Occupations: Musician, songwriter
- Instrument: Vocals
- Years active: 2015–present
- Label: Phalombe Muzik

Giboh Pearson (born 29 August 1997) is a Malawian local musician and songwriter. He is known for his Afrobeat and amapiano-inspired sound and is among the leading young artists from Phalombe District.

In 2024, he won a Maso award in the title best local sound of the year. He gained recognition with hits such as Ndizakukwatira, Budget, and Wandilakwira, and is the founder of the Phalombe Muzik Band.

== Career ==
Pearson began recording music in the mid-2010s and built a following through local performances and online music platforms. His breakout track Wandilakwira earned radio play across Malawi, and subsequent singles established him as a versatile local artist.

In 2022, he released the single Ndizakukwatira, which became one of his most streamed tracks. He has collaborated with artists such as Joseph Nkasa on the amapiano track Go Konko.

Pearson launched the Phalombe Muzik Band in Migowi as a way of promoting live performance and inspiring the local music industry.

== Community work ==
Outside music, Pearson has been involved in youth empowerment initiatives. He has organized sports and music activities in Phalombe aimed at inspiring young people and keeping them engaged.

In 2023, he survived flash floods in southern Malawi, an incident that was widely reported in regional media.

== Discography ==
=== Selected singles ===
- Wandilakwira (2020)
- Ndizakukwatira (2022)
- Budget (2022)
- Go Konko (feat. Joseph Nkasa, 2022)
- Galu Ndine (2024)
