= Malawi Women in Mining Association =

- Abbreviation: MAWIMA
- Formation: October 1999
- Founder: Alice Sumani
- Type: Women's association
- Region served: Malawi
- President: Emma Adams
- Affiliations: International Women in Mining

Malawi Women in Mining Association (MAWIMA) is an association of women working in Malawi's mining sector, most of them in artisanal and small-scale mining. It was launched in 2000 to promote and economically empower women miners.

== History ==
MAWIMA was formed in October 1999 with Emma Mphonde as its first president.It was launched on 1 August 2000 by Alice Sumani, then Deputy Minister of Natural Resources and Environmental Affairs, with assistance from the United Nations Development Programme and the Forum for African Women Educationalists Malawi (FAWEMA). At the time of the launch in 2000, when women were estimated to make up 24 per cent of Malawi's miners. A 2014 symposium held to gather artisanal miners' input into Malawi's first Artisanal and Small-Scale Mining Policy is described by the IISD report as having reinvigorated the association. MAWIMA went on to hold a three-day gathering, an annual general meeting, in Lilongwe from 27 to 29 April, its first since 2003. MAWIMA president, Emma Adams, attributed the long gap to a lack of funds. The guest of honour was Mary Chilima, wife of then Vice-President Saulos Chilima. During the meeting, then Minister of Gender Patricia Kaliati, urged MAWIMA to work with the One Village One Product programme to obtain value-addition machinery

== Advocacy ==
In 2015, MAWIMA called for affirmative clauses on women to be included in Malawi's new Mines and Minerals Act, after its president, Emma Adams, said the first draft bill had nothing tangible on the issues facing women in mining. She listed the challenges facing women miners as lack of reliable markets, capital and machinery, difficulty obtaining licences, and poor deals from middlemen. In August 2025, the associations president told Nation Online that ongoing mining reforms had left women out, and that MAWIMA's research had found women's mining cooperatives unaware of the reforms. Moreover the ban on the export of gemstones was reducing the income of her members.

== Membership and structure ==
International Women in Mining reported in 2016 that most MAWIMA members were artisanal miners extracting gemstones and industrial minerals as an alternative to subsistence farming, and that members were seeking sponsorship for equipment to make beads and jewellery for the tourist market. The association is organised by region. In 2016 its regional chairperson for the south was Hellen Chasowa. The IISD report described it Northern Region branch, chaired by mine owner Margaret Banda as having more than 50 members from Mzimba, Mzuzu and Ekwendeni.

== Assessment ==
A 2017 Adam Smith International study found differing views of MAWIMA's effectiveness. One interviewee called it one of the strongest local associations for women in mining in Malawi, acting as a direct link to local government and to the Department of Mines and the Geological Survey Department. Others said it was dominated by small-scale mining business owners more interested in their own businesses, lacked strong governance, and had not passed information on mining law and policy to members who with limited education or communication access. The study concluded that MAWIMA functioned more as a collective of women in artisanal and small-scale mining than as a broader women-in-mining network, and suggested that separate networks were needed for women in technical and professional roles.
