= NGO Gender Coordination Network =

- Abbreviation: NGO-GCN
- Formation: 1998
- Type: Non-governmental organisation network
- Headquarters: Malawi
- Fields: Gender equality, women's rights and advocacy
- Board Chairperson: Maggie Kathewera Banda (elected 2023)
- Website: https://www.ngogcnmw.org/

The Malawian NGO Gender Coordination Network (NGO GCN) is a civil society network established in 1998 to coordinate organisations working on gender equality and women's rights in Malawi.

== History ==
NGO-GCN was established in 1998 to coordinate the work of non-governmental organisations working on gender-related and women's rights issues in Malawi. The network strengthens the capacity of non-governmental organisations to promote gender equality and women's empowerment through civic education, capacity building, advocacy, research, knowledge management and information sharing. In December 2023 it had 51 active civil society member organisations. In 2024 and 2025 its chairperson put the membership at 63 local organisations.

== Organisation and areas of work ==
NGO-GCN operates as a membership network working in five thematic areas, with member organisations grouped into matching clusters: gender-based violence, women in politics and decision-making, gender-related laws, child rights and agriculture and women's economic empowerment. The network bases its work on frameworks including CEDAW, the African Union Protocol on the Rights of Women in Africa, the SADC Protocol on Gender and Development, teh Sustainable Development Goals and Malawi's National Gender Policy. NGO-GCN has a full-time secretariat.

=== Gender based violence ===
In May 2006, Joyce Banda, then Minister of Gender, told the UN Committee on the Elimination of Discrimination Against Women that her ministry had depended heavily on NGO-GCN acting as a lobby group to pass a domestic violence Bill through Parliament.

In 2021, NGO-GCN ran a year-long project titled Women Movements Amplify,under the United Nations Spotlight Initiative, funded by the European Union. It set up women's radio action groups to amplify women's voices on gender-based violence and bring cases to the attention of the authorities. Groups were formed in four traditional authorities of Ntchisi District, and the project also covered Nsanje, Machinga, Dowa, Nkhata Bay and Mzimba Districts.

In August 2023, in a statement signed by then Chairperson Barbara Banda, the network responded to remarks by former Malawi netball player Mary Waya about the conduct of some of the male coaches in African netball. It called on sports associations, governing bodies and law enforcement agencies to investigate the allegations, and on sports organisations to set up reporting mechanisms for players.

in July 2026 after the murder of a woman doctor at Queen Elizabeth Central Hospital in Blantyre, eight months after another Blantyre-based woman doctor was killed, the network called on the Government of Malawi to treat femicide and gender-based violence as a national emergency. It also called for thorough and transparent investigations, faster handling of gender-based violence cases by the courts, stronger legal protections for women, and greater involvement of traditional and religious leaders, men, the media and civil society in prevention.

=== Women's political participation ===
Before the 2009 general elections, NGO-GCN coordinated the 50-50 Campaign, which aimed to increase the number of women in Parliament. The campaign was supported by the Ministry of Women and financed by international donors, and in the 2009 to 2014 parliament, women made up 22.3 per cent of members. Writing about the campaign, political scientists Inge Amundsen and Happy Kayuni identified the campaign's challenges as a lack of full support from political parties, conflict among gender NGOs, and short-termism. During the 2014 campaign, the network gave financial, material and moral support to women candidates regardless of their political affiliation and more than 250 women parliamentary candidates and 2,000 women local council candidates received training. In the May 2014 election the number of women in Parliament fell to 32 from 43 in 2009. The networks national coordinator Emma Kaliya said the reasons for this had yet to be established, whilst the Principal Secretary in the Ministry of Gender, Dr Mary Shawa, attributed the result to the patriarchal nature of Malawian society.

In September 2020, NGO-GCN, the Human Rights Defenders Coalition, Youth and Society and the Women Lawyers Association gave the government seven days to reconstitute parastatal boards that did not comply with the Gender Equality Act, or face court action. The network's chairperson, Barbara Banda, declined a seat on the board of the Technical Entrepreneurial and Vocational Education and Training Authority - calling the appointments illegal. Then Minister of Information Gospel Kazako said the government would not operate on ultimatums, and the State House said more women would be added when institutions nominated their representatives.

In 2025, NGO-GCN was one of the organisations, with the Women's Legal Resources Centre (WOLREC), Oxfam in Malawi and UN Women, leading the Women's Manifesto Movement, a platform of women's rights organisations. President Lazarus Chakwera received an edition of the manifesto at Kamuzu Palace that same year. In May 2026, Kathewera Banda represented the movement with a delegation that presented the manifesto to First Vice President Jane Ansah; the movement was seeking audience with President Peter Mutharika.

=== Regional and international engagement ===
NGO-GCN is a member of Solidarity for African Women's Rights (SOAWR). When the UN Committee on the Elimination of Violence against Women considered Malawi's report in January 2010, representatives of NGO-GCN were members of the Malawi delegation. From 2015 ro 2018, NGO-GCN was one of four non-state partners in UN Women's Gender Based Governance programme, funded by the Royal Norwegian Embassy with an estimated budget of US$2.08 million across all partners. The programme aimed to strengthen the network as a coordinator of gender work in Malawi. Its 201 midterm evaluation found that implementation of the project had been minimal and that member capacity building and dialogue with the private sector had not materialised.

== Leadership ==
Emma Kaliya was listed as the chairperson in 2010. Barbara Banda chaired the board from 2018 to 2023. Maggie Kathewera Banda, executive director of WOLREC, was elected board chairperson at the annual general meeting in Lilongwe on 12 December 2023, with David Odalli as her vice and Wesley Chabwera as Treasurer. Gavelet Mzembe served as the network coordinator.

== See also ==
- Women in Malawi
- Coalition for the Empowerment of Women and Girls
- Women Lawyers Association (Malawi)
