= Tiaone Hendry =

Malawian politician

- Known for: member of the National Assembly from 2025
- Political party: Democratic Progressive Party

Tiaone Hendry is a Malawian politician who is a member of the National Assembly from 2025. She represents Phalombe South.

== Life ==
Hendry took part in the DPP's primaries in Phalombe South but she was not successful. Mary Mpanga was chosen as the party's candidate and the contestants complained that the system favoured the sitting candidate.

At the end of 2024 and before the 2025 election, Hendry, made a substantial donation to her community. She offered a donation of 7 million Kwacha to establish a local football league contest with prizes. She also gave an ambulance vehicle which could be used to take local people to Chiyaleni District hospital. A ceremony was arranged at the Chiyalini Primary school for her donation.

Hendry was successful in the DPP's primaries despite fears that the institutions favoured male candidates.

In the 16 September 2025 election she won the Phalombe South seat for the Democratic Progressive Party. She was the only woman elected in the district. Maggie Kathewera-Banda noted her election and noted that she was 20% of the Phalombe South MPs and this reflected the national position where just over 20% of the MPs are women.

Announcements were made in November about who was to lead the new parliament's main committees. Hendry was chosen as the chair of the Natural Resources, Energy & Climate Change committee. Yona Adadawiza Mkandawire was to be the vice-chair and the two of them could serve until 2030.
