= Mutani Tambala =

Malawian politician

Member of the National Assembly
- Constituency: Neno South

Mutani Elliam Tambala is a Malawian politician who became the MP for Neno South in 2025.

== Life ==
Tambala was an independent candidate in the 2009 election in Neno South. She came second to Reen Bessie Kachere of the DPP.

In 2014 she was a known candidate for the Neno South constituency. She was a member of the People's Party. She caused some consternation when she refused to get involved with the distribution of free maize which the leader of her party, Jane Banda, had arranged.

She was elected to parliament in the 2025 election in September at the same time as Mary Maulidi Khembo also became a Democratic Progressive Party MP. Khembo was elected in Neno East. Activists who had been trying to encourage women candidates held Neno up as "Malawi’s top performer in women’s political representation" as they also had Martha Chapendeka as a councillor in Neno North.

After Tambala was sworn in she said that her priorities included the Neno road. In November 2025, she was chosen to be the chair of the parliamentary committee looking at Education, Science and Technology. Her vice-chair was Professor Golden Chizimba Msilimba and they were both appointed for a term that finishes in 2030.
