= Phalombe District =

District of Malawi

Coordinates: 15°40′S 35°40′E

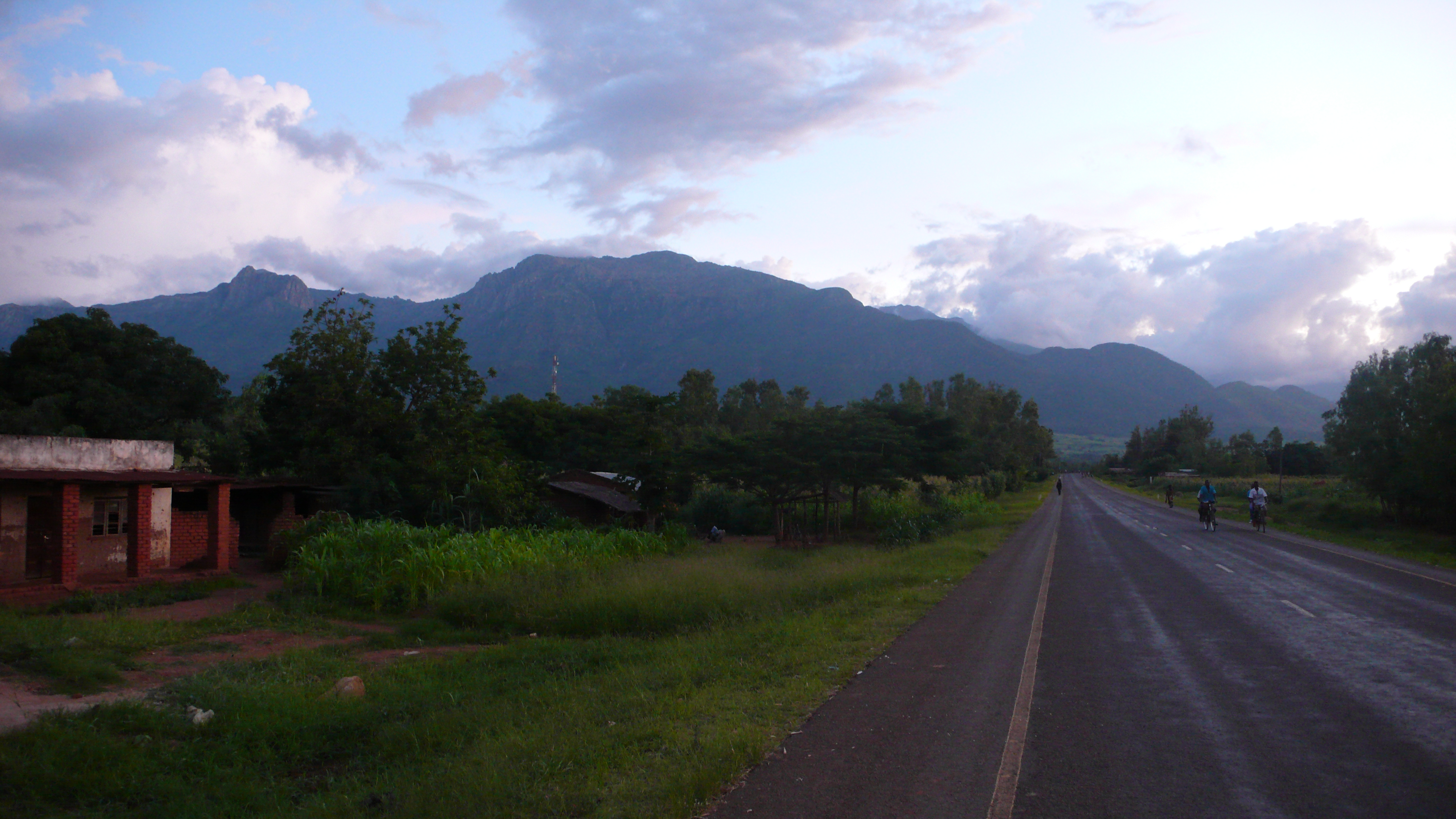
Mulanje View from Phalombe

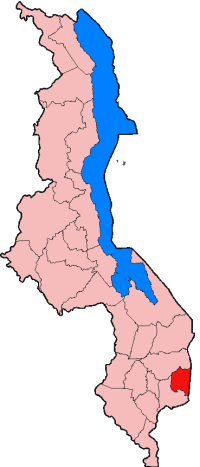
Location of Phalombe District in Malawi

Phalombe is a district in the Southern Region of Malawi. The capital is Phalombe. The district covers an area of 1,394 km.² and has a population of 231,990. Within the district is the Songwe Hill Rare Earth Project which has been identified as of strategic importance to the European Union.

Phalombe district borders Mozambique and it is one of thirteen districts in the Southern region of Malawi. The district has a council which includes MPs, councillors from the district's wards and ex-officio members.

== Demographics ==
At the time of the 2018 Census of Malawi, the distribution of the population of Phalombe District by ethnic group was as follows:

- 94.8% Lomwe
- 3.4% Nyanja
- 0.5% Chewa
- 0.4% Yao
- 0.3% Mang'anja
- 0.2% Ngoni
- 0.1% Tumbuka
- 0.1% Sena
- 0.1% Tonga
- 0.0% Nkhonde
- 0.0% Lambya
- 0.0% Sukwa
- 0.0% Others

== Government and administrative divisions ==
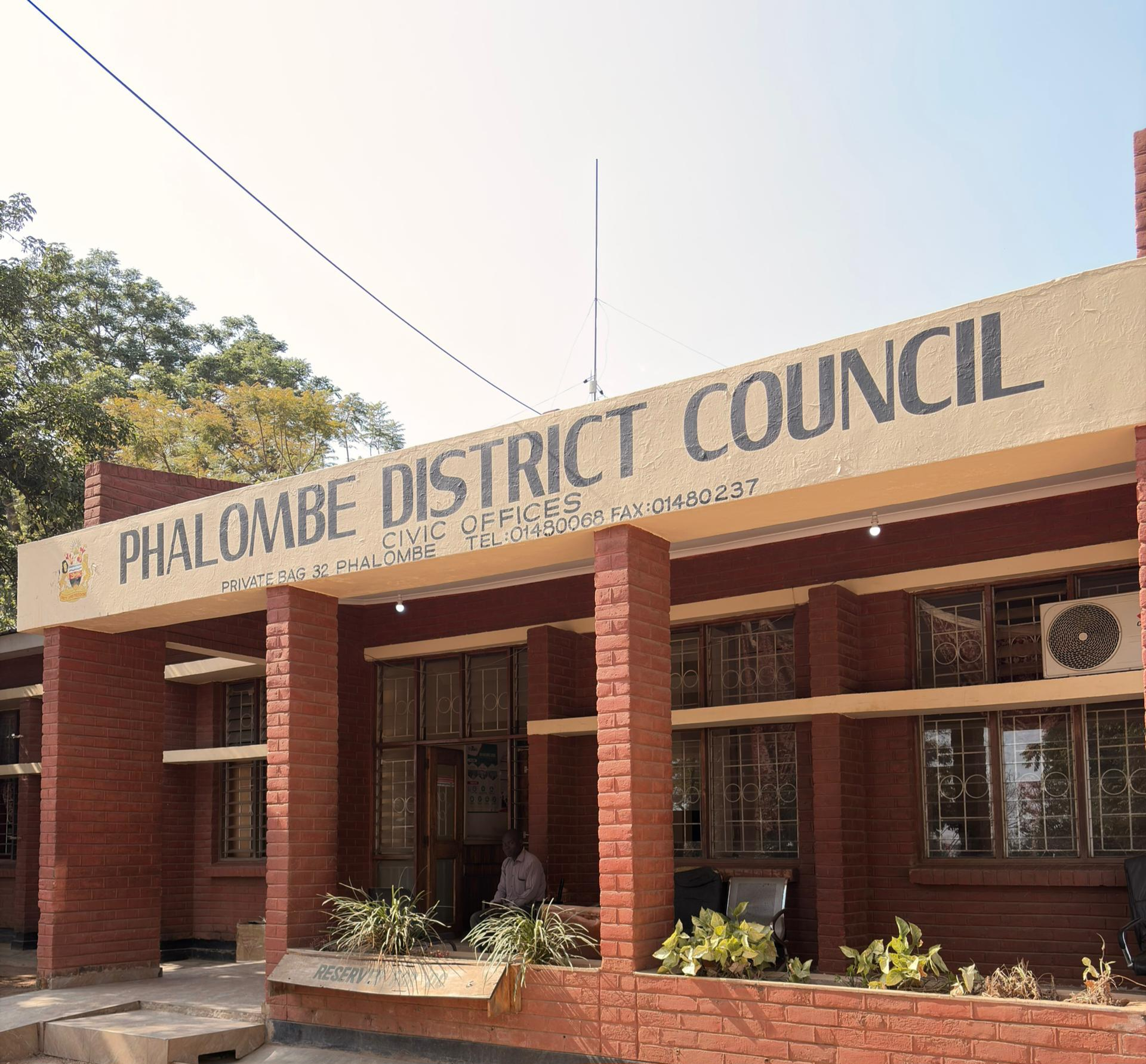
Phalombe District Council offices in 2026

There are five National Assembly constituencies in Phalombe:

- Phalombe - Central
- Phalombe - East
- Phalombe - North
- Phalombe - North East
- Phalombe - South

Since the 2009 election all of these constituencies have been held by members of the Democratic Progressive Party.

In 2025 all of the constituencies were represented by men, with the exception of Phalombe South that was won by Tiaone Hendry of the Democratic Progressive Party. This was same as the previous election where there had been a single woman winner in the Phalombe region.
