= Mary Connie Livuza Mpanga =

Malawaian politician

Mary Connie Livuza Mpanga is a politician in Malawi. She represents Phalombe South in the National Assembly of Malawi.

== Life ==
Mpanga was first elected in 2009 and she became a member of the Democratic Progressive Party (DPP). She is a member of the Malawi Parliamentary Women's Caucus.

Mpanga was an independent MP but following the 2019 election she was among a group of MPs including Naomi Phiri who agreed to support the Democratic Progressive Party. She represents Phalombe South in the National Assembly of Malawi.

In 2024 she was an opposition MP when she was unanimously appointed to be a Parliamentary Service Commissioner. This was a sign of support as the same group had rejected fellow DPP nominated Lonnie Chijere Phiri for the same role. Mpanga's appointment made the commission to be 50% women.

Mpanga had been identified by Parliament's First Deputy Madalitso Kazombo as a "respectable female parliamentarian" together with Lilian Patel and Roseby Gadama in September 2024.
