= Chimwemwe Kussein =

Malawi's ministry of genders's chief gender and development officer

- in 2026
- Occupation: civil servant
- Employer: Ministry of Gender
- Known for: Malawi's chief gender and development officer

Chimwemwe Grace Kussein was Malawi's Ministry of Gender's chief gender and development officer in 2026. She has been involved with encouraging more women to become politicians and to reduce the resulting gender based violence.

== Life ==
Kussein became the chief gender and development officer at the ministry of gender. In 2019 she was, with Sarai Chisala-Tempelhoff of EngenderHealth. They were addressing a meeting of traditional Chewe chiefs in Mponela in Dowa concerning the drive to reduce gender-based violence.

One of the issues was complaints by aspiring women politicians that they were subject to violence and there was little support for their complaints.

In 2024 the Ministry of Gender was considering introducing a quota system to ensure that 40% of members of parliament were women. At the time the percentage of women at the National Assembly was 22%. Kussein was involved in the discussions prior to the 2025 election. She welcomed improvements made in reducing gender based violence in the Dowa District. In 2025 she welcomed a manual developed to advice and assist women aspiring to be politicians. The manual was created by National Initiative for Civic Education (NICE) and the Centre for Civic Society Strengthening using UNDP funding. Another study she welcomed was of Malawian working married women. The local and American researchers found in 2025 that the benefit of a frequently abandoned smart phone was outweighed by the effect of a gift of its cash equivalent over several years.

The shortage of funds affects local climate change responses. Some international funding is available, and only a portion makes it through to women's groups. Kussein has to carry this message in 2026 and that as a result funding is limited.
