= Liana Chapota =

Malawian politician

Deputy Minister of Water and Sanitation of Malawi
- Incumbent
- Assumed office January 31, 2023
- President: Lazarus Chakwera

Personal details
- Born: Lilongwe
- Party: Malawi Congress Party

Liana Kakhobwe Chapota is a Malawian politician and educator. She became the Deputy Minister of Water and Sanitation in Malawi in 2023. She lost her seat in the 2025 Malawian general election.

== Life ==
Chapota was born in the capital city of Lilongwe and she was elected by the voters in the Lilongwe Msozi South constituency in 2019. She was in the Malawi Party.

She was a member of the Malawi Parliamentary Women's Caucus and in 2019 she and Lonnie Phiri came to Scotland for a week to meet Scottish parliamentarians. Phiri chaired and she attended a fringe meeting on 15 October at the 2019 Scottish National Party's annual conference.

She became the Deputy Minister of Water and Sanitation in Malawi, having been appointed by the president of Malawi Lazarus Chakwera. Her term began on January 31, 2023. Access to safe water and sanitation is a challenge in Malawi but she was able to report several improvements. Tree planting was in progress in the areas where rainwater is capture with a target in 2023 of creating 400,000 tree seedlings.

She stood in the 2025 Malawian general election to represent the Salima Central West constituency and lost her seat.

Awards and achievements
Preceded by	Deputy Minister of Water and Sanitation of Malawi	Succeeded by
