= Marium Ajida =

Malawian politician

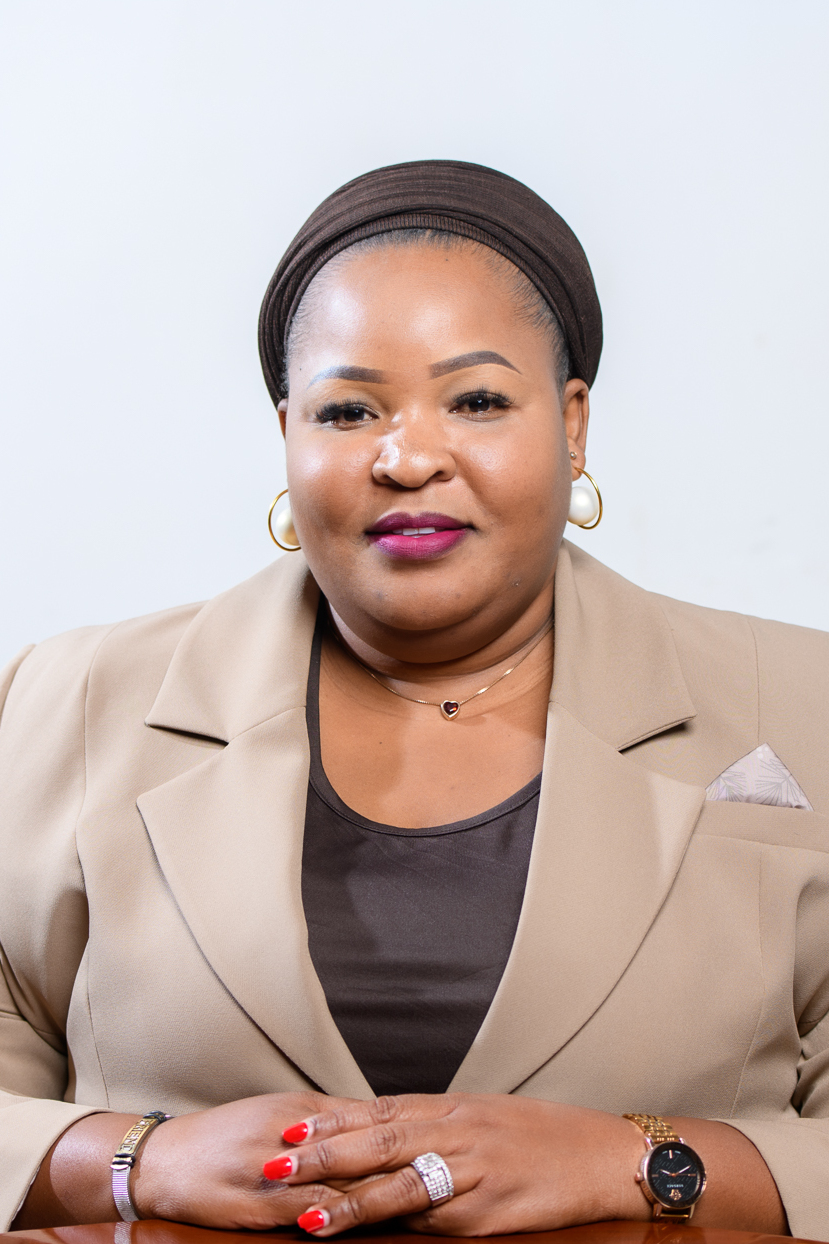
- in 2026

Member of the National Assembly (Malawi)
- Incumbent
- Assumed office 2025
- Constituency: Mulanje Pasani

Personal details
- Party: Independent

Marium Ajida is a Malawian politician who has represented the Mulanje Pasani constituency in the National Assembly from 2025.

== Life ==
Ajida was elected to parliament by the Mulanje Pasani Constituency in 2025 as an independent. There are nine constituencies in Mulanje District and in 2025 all but two were won by men. Four prospective women candidates lost; Ajida and Patricia Kaliati were the only women elected.

In April 2026 Ajida expressed concern about the Constituency Development Fund. She cited examples of poor value for money in Mulanje Pasani where buildings did not reflect the money invested. The Mulanje District council representative said that improvements would happen.

In August 2026 Ajida was involved in debating improvements to financial services. There was a concern that rural areas could find it difficult to manage without cheques because electronic payments required adequate internet access. Ajida noted that cheques could not be retained because of legal issues.
