= Reen Kachere =

Malawian politician

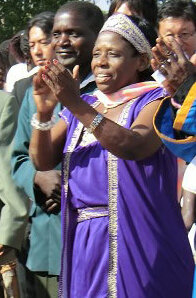
- Kachere in 2013

Member of the National Assembly of Malawi
- In office 2009–2014
- Preceded by: Mutani Tambala
- Succeeded by: Mary Maulidi Khembo
- Constituency: Neno South

Personal details
- Born: 24 April 1954
- Died: 1 August 2022 (aged 68) Lilongwe, Malawi
- Party: Democratic Progressive Party

Reen Bessie Kachere (24 April 1954 – 1 August 2022) was a Malawian politician. She was the minister of gender, child and community development. Prior to the September 2011 cabinet reshuffle, she served as the minister for persons with disabilities and the elderly.

== Life ==
Kachere was the Democratic Progressive Party candidate in the 2009 election in Neno South. She won the seat beating Mutani Tambala who was an independent. She ran for reelection as an independent in the 2014 election, losing to Mary Maulidi Khembo.

== Katsonga–Kachere standoff ==
In 2011 political tensions between former parliamentarian for Neno West Constituency Mark Katsonga Phiri and Kachere developed over development projects in the constituency. She blocked attempts by Katsonga to rehabilitate boreholes and roads because Kachere accused Katsonga of having political motivations behind the projects.

== Death ==
Kachere died in Lilongwe on 1 August 2022.

== Legacy ==
Patricia Kaliati when she was Minister for Gender in 2020 later publicly thanked women's rights activists in Malawi. She named Kachere in a list that also included Faustace Chirwa, Margaret Ali, Emmie Chanika, Emma Kaliya, Mercy Timba and Jean Nkwanda.
