= Faustace Chirwa =

- Occupation: women's rights activist.
- Political party: United Democratic Front, People's Party

Faustace Chirwa is a Malawian women's rights activist and politician. She has been a parliamentary candidate for the United Democratic Front although she is known as a leading women's rights activist.

== Life ==
In 2013 she was the Chairperson for Malawi Council for the Handicapped having been appointed by President Joyce Banda. This council was close to the President and it was much later legally mandated and known as the Malawi Council for Disability Affairs. When she resigned she cited difficulties with her authority as she continued to speak out on important matters.

She stood as the United Democratic Front's candidate for the Chitipa Central constituency in 2014 in support of Atupele Muluzi who was a prospective presidential candidate.

In 2019 she was the deputy spokesperson for Joyce Banda's People's Party. She resigned in protest when Joyce Banda who had been a presidential candidate stood back and recommended Lazarus Chakwera for President in the May 21 Tripartite Elections.

In 2020, Patricia Kaliati who was then the Minister for Gender, gave thanks for the women who had inspired her. She named Chirwa as well as Margaret Ali, Emmie Chanika, Emma Kaliya, Reen Kachere, Barbara Banda and Maggie Kathewera Banda, Mercy Timba and Jean Nkwanda.
