= Anita Kalinde =

Malawian politician

Member of Parliament
- Constituency: Thyolo North

Minister of Water Development and Irrigation
- Incumbent
- Assumed office 2014

Deputy Leader of the House
- Incumbent
- Assumed office 2013

Chair of the Malawi Parliamentary Women's Caucus
- Succeeded by: Jean Kalilani

Personal details
- Spouse: Marshall Mdukulira Mbwatalika
- Occupation: Politician

Anita Kalinde was the MP for Thyolo North in Malawi. She made the news when she had a tussle with the Minister of Home Affairs and Internal Security in parliament.

== Life ==
In 2010 Jean Kalilani took over the chair of the Malawi Parliamentary Women's Caucus, in 2010, after a difficult time when Kalinde was the chair. It was suspected that Kalinde, who was Joyce Banda's niece, had used the position to forward their political ambitions. However the President disliked Banda.

In 2013 she was the house's Deputy leader who had to correct, Juliana Mphande, the second deputy speaker who had lost her way with procedure. In 2014 she was the Minister for Water Development and Irrigation.

== Kalinde–Sangala parliament tussle ==
Kalinde received much media attention when she was involved in a physical attack in parliament with the former Minister of Home Affairs & National Defense, Aaron Sangala in 2011. During a session in parliament on the Robert Chasowa murder case, Kalinde had requested that the Minister of Home Affairs and Internal Security clarify some issues. In his response, Sangala implied that atrocities involving the removal of body parts was common in the previous UDF regime, he noted that Kalinde herself and her deceased husband, Marshall Mdukulira Mbwatalika nicknamed 'The Duke', had been involved in a case where body part had been removed and traded. Kalinde accused Sangala of using delay tactics and diverging from the topic in order to avoid answering the questions. Kalinde requested that Sangala withdraw his statement. Sangala did not withdraw his statement. When the Speaker of Parliament Henry Chimunthu Banda adjourned the proceedings for tea break, she quickly proceeded towards Sangala, grabbed him by the neck. Sangala's shirt was ripped in the process. Some accused Sangala of ripping his own shirt in order to exaggerate the extent of the grab. After a review of the incident, including video footage of the attack, she was suspended for thirty days for the attack. Video material of the attack went viral in both Malawi and abroad.
