= Lilian Patel =

Malawian politician (born 1951)

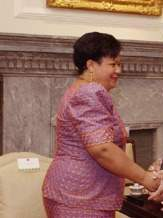
- Born: 21 February 1951 (age 75)
- Occupation: Politician
- Known for: MP for Mangochi South
- Political party: United Democratic Front (UDF)

Lilian Estella Patel (born 21 February 1951) is a Malawian politician. She has represented Mangochi South in the National Assembly for the United Democratic Front (UDF) since 2014 and previously from 1994 to 2009. She has served as a minister with a number of portfolios. In 2024 she was appointed as the Chair of the UDF.

== Life ==
Patel joined the United Democratic Front (UDF) in the early 1990s and she first represented Mangochi South in 1994.

She joined the National Association of Business Women which had been founded in 1990 by Joyce Banda. Other members included Alice Sumani and Mary Kaphwereza Banda and they, Patel and Banda went on to be government ministers.

Patel was the Minister of Women's and Children's Affairs, Community Development and Social Welfare from 1996 to 1999. In 1996 she was one of nine women among the 177 members of the parliament. The idea of a women's caucus was put forward and the nine politicians put aside their party allegiances to work together. They wanted to make sure that whenever there was an issue that was related to women then they would act together. Patel became the first chair of the Malawi Parliamentary Women's Caucus.

There were more women in Malawi's parliament after the 1999 elections and Patel one of them. She continued to chair the caucus. Women related issues were debated in parliament but there was little related change to the law.

Patel served as Minister of Health from 1999 to 2000 and as foreign minister of Malawi from 2000 to 2004. After serving as foreign minister, she was Minister of Labour and Vocational Training from 2004 to 2005.

She lost the election to Yusuf Matumula in 2009 but she regained the seat in 2014.

She has represented Mangochi South in the National Assembly for the United Democratic Front since 2014, She was called one of the longest-serving parliamentarians in 2024 who was loyal to her party.

In 2024 UDF National Convention in Blantyre gathered 1,200 delegates. It was announced that former President Bakili Muluzi was to take the role of patron to the party. He appointed Patel as the chair of the UDF lauding her integrity. She had been identified by Parliament's First Deputy Madalitso Kazombo as a "respectable female parliamentarian" together with Mary Mpanga and Roseby Gadama in September 2024.

Political offices
Preceded by Brown Mpinganjira	Foreign Minister of Malawi; 2000–2004	Succeeded by George Chaponda
