= Aaron Sangala =

Malawian politician (born 1958)

Aaron Sangala (born 1958) is a politician who was appointed Minister of Internal Affairs and Public Security in the cabinet of Malawi in May 2009.

== Artistic and educational career ==
Aaron Sangala was born in 1958, grandson of James Frederick Sangala, a founding member of the Nyasaland African Congress. Sangala worked for Lever Brothers (1974–1981), for the French Embassy teaching modern languages at the French Cultural Centre, and at St. Andrews High School teaching music. He is a founding member of the Sambangoma Cultural Troupe, Capital Theatre, Blantyre Round Table and Tiakalulu Guitar Quartet. With Ricardo Garcia and Bashir Sacranie, he was a founder member of the group Kalulu.

== Political career ==
Sangala was elected as Member of Parliament for Blantyre Ndirande Malabada in 2004. In June 2006 he was appointed as Deputy Minister of Health, in May 2007 became Deputy Minister of Women and Child Development. In 2008 he became Minister of National Defense. He contested the May 2009 General Election on a Democratic Progressive Party (DPP) ticket and was reelected. Sangala was appointed as Minister of Internal affairs and Public Security in the cabinet that became effective on 15 June 2009. He retained this position in the cabinet announced on 9 August 2010. He was infamously involved in a parliament brawl with MP Anita Kalinde in 2011 while serving as Minister of Defense. Sangala was physically assaulted in parliament by Kalinde, in a video that was aired on television and went viral in Malawi.
