= Lonnie Phiri =

Malawian politician

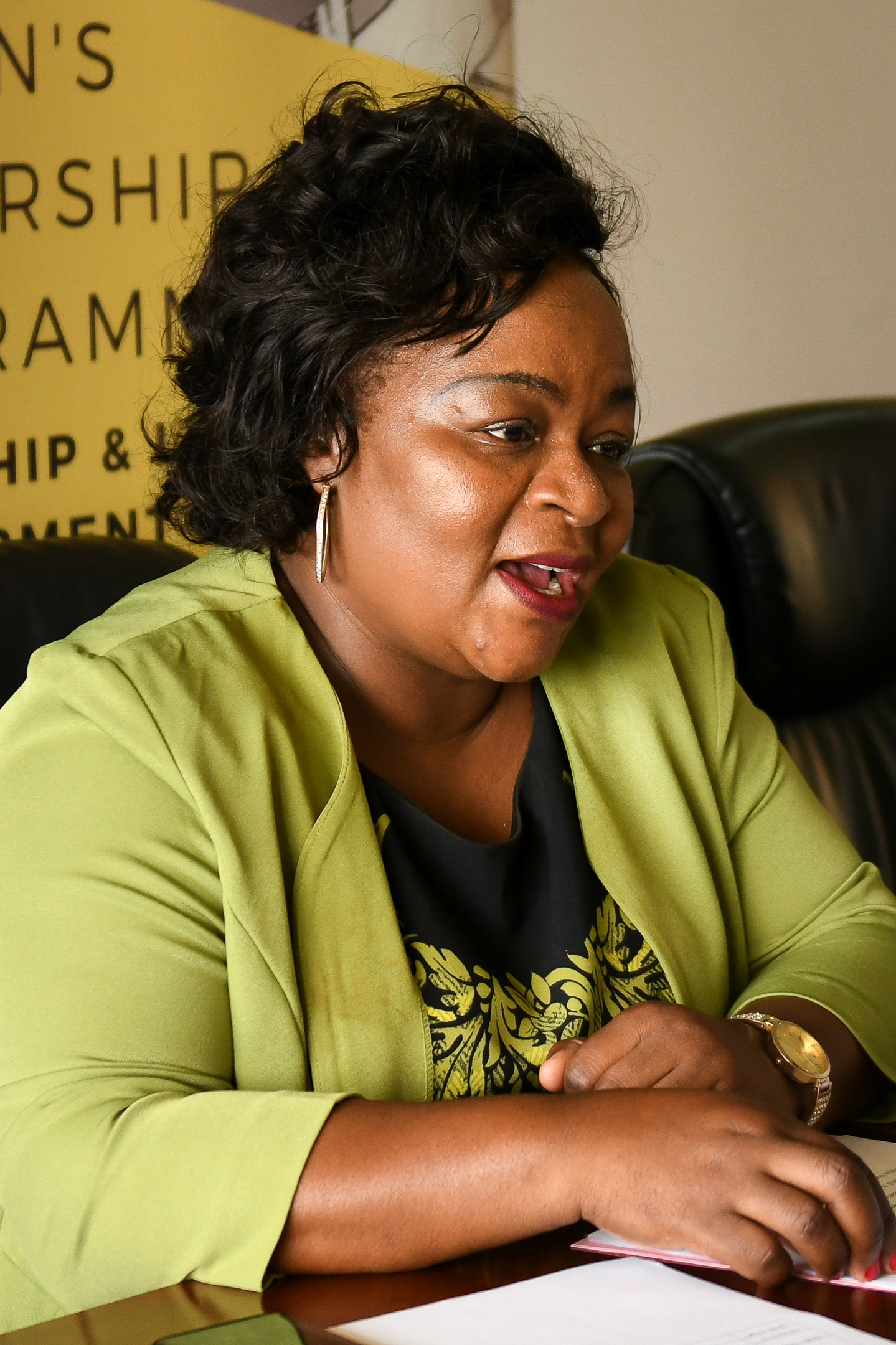
- Chairing the Malawi Parliamentary Women's Caucus
- Occupation: politician
- Political party: Democratic Progressive Party

Lonnie Chijere Phiri is a Democratic Progressive Party Member of Parliament representing a constituency in Zomba in southern Malawi. She was the chair of Malawi's Parliamentary Women Caucus.

== Life ==
She was a member of the Malawi's Parliamentary Women Caucus and in 2019 she and Liana Chapota came to Scotland for a week to meet Scottish parliamentarians. She chaired a fringe meeting at the 2019 Scottish National Party's annual conference in October.

In 2021, she was the elected chair of the Malawi Parliamentary Women's Caucus, whose members are the women MPs who make up a minority of the male-dominated National Assembly. The caucus were concerned that low ambitions and child marriage was endemic in girls in Malawi's primary schools. Caucus members, including Phiri, went to visit schools to encourage the girls to work hard and be ambitious. Phiri wore a school uniform to make the point, that she started in a primary school.

In 2022 she announced that she had funded the installation of solar powered lighting in the 40 mosques in her constituency. The lighting can be used for prayers in the early morning or in the later evening.

In August 2024, her party (the Democratic Progressive Party) was in opposition and, she was nominated to become a Parliamentary Service Commissioner. But her nomination was rejected. One commentator said other members considered her to be disruptive. After that Mary Mpanga was proposed. She was another opposition MP and she was unanimously appointed to be a Parliamentary Service Commissioner. This appointment made the commission to be 50% women.

In the same month (August 2024), Phiri announced that had used the constituency development fund to build a new school. It is called Kachere Junior Primary School and it will teach years 1 to 4. Phiri expected it to be successful as many local children had stopped attending school because the nearest ones were so far away.

On 26 February 2025 Phiri and fellow party-member Grace Kwelepeta had their cars vandalised while they were at parliament. The damage included tyres being punctured and mirrors being smashed. The cars were parked in a secure area when a mob arrived which included Malawi Congress Party supporters. Police were on duty but there were no arrests and when the mob was cleared they inflicted damage on the way. Offers were made to replace tyres, but in April Grace Kwelepeta said that she had given sufficient time for parliament to make good on all the damage to her official car and she intended to go to court.
