= Grace Kwelepeta =

Member of Malawian parliament for Zomba Malosa

- Occupations: teacher and politician
- Known for: Member of the National Assembly of Malawi
- Political party: Democratic Progressive Party

Grace Kwelepeta became the Malawian member of National Assembly of Malawi for Zomba Malosa in 2019. She was a teacher and she takes an interest in education and in particular the education of girls. She has been an executive member of the National Governing Council and a Deputy Minister for Gender.

== Life ==
Kwelepeta studied linguistics and humanities and trained as a teacher. She taught in a secondary school before she entered full-time politics. She joined the Democratic Progressive Party and she became the representative member of parliament for the Zomba Malosa Constituency in 2019. This was a seat previously held by Joyce Banda (who became the President of Malawi). In the assembly nearly 80% of the members are male, but she was one of the five women named in the new President's 24-strong team when Mary Navicha was named as the Minister for Gender and Kelepeta was named as the Deputy Minister for Gender.

At the National Assembly Kwelepeta was an executive member of the National Governing Council. She took an interest in transport,infrastructure and women's rights in the National Assembly.

Kwelepeta takes a continuing interest in education. She encourages students to study and she offers prizes to high performing students and teachers in her constituency. She was invited to attend a girl's retreat for girls by Ulanda Mtamba who was the country director of Advancing Girls Education in Africa (AGE Africa). The annual retreat is held in Zomba for 100 girls from a number of different schools. Kwelepeta and Ulanda Mtamba encouraged the girls to not just look for a job but to become entrepreneurs and create jobs. They were advised to prioritise study over romance. Kwelepeta was hailed as an inspiration by the girls.

In January 2024, she spent a night outside blocking the way of a lorry load of maize in Zomba. The maize was intended for the poor and she wanted to ensure that her constituency was given a good share.

She has been a deputy minister for gender and at the end of 2024 she interrupted a debate about fuel to raise her concerns. She complained to the speaker that women members were being undermined by some male members of the house. She said that this was unacceptable and the Leader of the House Richard Chimwendo Banda agreed with her. He gave a general admonishment and reminder to the house but did not name any member in particular. Edyth Kambalame of The Nation assumed that this implied that several men were involved.

On 26 February 2025 she and fellow party-member Lonnie Phiri had their cars vandalised while they were attending parliament. The damage included tyres being punctured and mirrors being smashed. The cars were parked in a secure area when a mob arrived which included Malawi Congress Party supporters. Police were on duty, but there were no arrests and when the mob was chased away they inflicted damage to the cars. Offers were made to replace tyres, but in April Grace Kwelepeta said that she had given sufficient time for parliament to make good on all the damage to her official car and she intended to go to court.

She was re-elected in the 2025 election. She became the secretary of the Malawi Parliamentary Women's Caucus.
