= Kate Kainja =

Malawian academic and politician (1950–2007)

- Born: 1950; Lilongwe, Malawi
- Died: December 2007 (aged 56–57); York, England
- Occupations: Academic and government minister
- Known for: Minister for Women and Child Development
- Political party: Malawi Congress Party
- Children: 3

Kate Kainja or Kate Catherine Kainja (1950 – December 2007) was a Malawian academic and politician. She was the Minister for Women and Child Development and she served in Hastings Banda's cabinet. She was a member of the Malawi Congress Party.

== Life ==
Kainja was born in Lilongwe in 1950. Her first career was as an academic at the University of Malawi.

She became a lecturer in home economics at Chancellor College which is part of the University of Malawi. In 1990 she presented her paper concerning "The Role of Women in Resource Management"

After independence, Malawi was ruled by its first President Hastings Banda, she was offered a position as a government minister within the cabinet in 1992. In the following year she was the secretary general of the ruling Malawi Congress Party (MCP) when the President held an election to decide if the people wanted his one party state. They did not. She was elected to Malawi's National Assembly in 1994.

In 1999 she won the Dedza South West constituency taking over 16,000 of the 23,000 votes for the Malawi Congress Party.

In 2004 she retained her position as Dedza South West constituency's member of parliament. She had stood for the Malawi Congress Party beating the second place independent by about 1,000 votes. She was the Minister of Gender from 2006 to 2008.

In September of the same year the President appointed Mary Nangwale as the first woman to head the country's police. She was never confirmed in the position because of political in-fighting. Kainja resigned from the MCP because the party refused to ratify Nangwale.

In 2007 Guy Ritchie and Madonna wanted to adopt a Malawian child. Penstone Kilembe wanted to go to the UK to assess their suitability. Kainja was the Minister for Women and Child Development and she prevented Kilembe from travelling to interview the couple as prospective parents for David Banda. Kainja did not object to the adoption but she wanted to prevent Kilembe travelling on a ticket he had requested from the couple. Kainja preferred for the couple to be assessed by someone who was in the UK.

Kainja died in a British hospital in York in December 2007.

== Publications include ==
- The Role of Women in Resource Management, 1990
- National case study on the role of female teachers in the enrolment and persistence of girls in primary schools, 1999 (with Francis Mkandawire)
