= Alice Sumani =

Malawian politician

- Known for: Minister of Gender
- Successor: Joyce Banda (as Minister of Gender)

Alice Sumani or Mrs A. Sumani is a Malawian politician. She has served as the Minister of Gender and the Minister of Mines.

== Lives ==
Sumani joined Malawi's National Association of Business Women which had been founded in 1990 by Joyce Banda. Other members included Lilian Patel and Mary Kaphwereza Banda and they, Sumani and Banda went on to become government ministers.

Sumani became the Minister of Gender in 1993 and she served for a year before being succeeded by Lilian Patel.

In 1994 she was the successful UDF candidate in the Machinga Central constituency. She took the seat again in 1999. She served as the Deputy Minister of Transport and Civil Aviation from 1998 to 1999.

The Malawi Women in Mining Association (MAWIMA) was created in 1999 and launched by Sumani in 2000. 24 per cent of all miners are women so MAWIMA intended to empower them.

She was beaten in the 2004 election at Machinga Central. She gained over 6,000 votes on behalf of the United Democratic Front but she came second to Ellock Maotcha who was an independent. He had over 10,000 votes.
