= Minister of Gender (Malawi) =

Ministries of Gender, Labour and OPC Statutory departments in 2026

The Minister of Gender has been a ministerial position in the cabinet of Malawi under several Presidents. The title and precise role has varied. Mary Navicha became the Minister of Gender, Children, Disability & Social Welfare following the 2025 election.

The Ministry of Gender's chief gender and development officer in 2026 was Chimwemwe Kussein.

== List of officeholders ==
- 1994-1996 Edda E. Chitalo Minister of State for Women’s and Children’s Affairs
- 1996-1999 Lizzie Lossa Minister of Women’s and Children’s Affairs, Community Development and Social Welfare
- 1999-2000 Mary Kaphwereza Banda Minister of Women’s and Children’s Affairs, Community Development
- 2003-2004 Alice Sumani Minister of Gender and Community Services
- 2004-2006 Joyce Banda Minister of Women, Child Welfare and Community Service
- 2006-2008 Kate Kainja-Kaluluma Minister of Women and Child Development
- 2008-2009 Anna Andrew Namathanga Kachikho Minister of Women and Child Development
- 2009-2010 Patricia Kaliati Minister of Gender, Child Development and Community Development
- 2010-2011 Theresa Gloria Mwale Minister of Gender, Child and Community Development
- 2011-2013 Rene Bessie Kachere Minister of Gender, Child and Community Development
- 2013-2014 Mary Clara Makungwa Minister of Gender, Children and Social Welfare
- 2014-2016 Patricia Kaliati Minister of Gender, Children, Disability and Social Welfare
- 2016- currently Jean Kalilani Minister of Gender, Children, Disability and Social Welfare
- missing names
- 2022-currently Patricia Kaliati Minister of Gender, Children, Disability and Social Welfare
- 2025-currently Mary Navicha Minister of Gender, Children, Disability & Social Welfare.
