= Chitipa Central (Malawi Parliament constituency) =

Chitipa Central is a constituency for the National Assembly of Malawi, located in the Chitipa District of Malawi's Northern Region. It elects one Member of Parliament by the first past the post system. The constituency was represented by Democratic Progressive Party MP Clement Fukumele Mukumbwa. He became a deputy minister in 2017. Alinubwila Mwenesongole was elected in 2019.

== History ==
In 2014 Faustace Chirwa, who was at outspoken activist. represented the United Democratic Front unsuccessfully in the election.

=== Election results of 2019 ===
Election results of 2019
Name	Party	Votes
Dr. Moses Ramsey Mlenga	UTM	9,926
Clement Fukumele Mukumbwa	DPP	2,684
Alinubwila Mwenesongole	Ind	16,051
Dryvat Yotam Paul Simwanza	MCP	640
