= Zomba Malosa Constituency =

Malawian electoral constituency

- First-past-the-post constituency for the Parliament of Malawi
- District: Zomba
- Region: Southern Region

Current constituency
- Party: DPP
- Member: Grace Kwelepeta

Zomba Malosa Constituency is a constituency for the National Assembly of Malawi, located in the Zomba District of Malawi's Southern Region. It is one of the 10 constituencies in the district that elects one member of parliament by the first past the post system.

The constituency has several wards, all electing councilors for the Zomba District. In 2009, the member of parliament who represented the constituency was Joyce Banda. In 2019 it was Grace Kwelepeta and in 2026 it was still Kwelepeta.

== Members of parliament ==
Elections	MP	Party	Notes	References
2009	Joyce Banda	DPP	Multi-party system	
2019	Grace Kwelepeta		Multi-party system	
2025	Grace Kwelepeta		Multi-party system	
