= Malawi Parliamentary Women's Caucus =

Cross party group of women who are members of Malawi's National Assembly

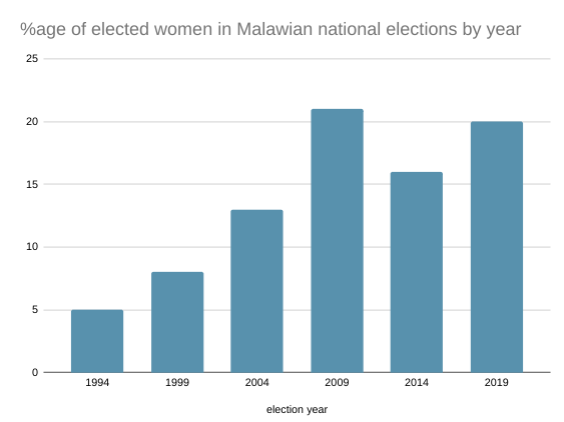
- %age of elected women in Malawian national elections (2025 was again about 20%)
- Formation: 1996
- Founders: Lilian Patel et al
- Purpose: women's representation
- Headquarters: Lilongwe
- Services: Women's rights
- Official language: English
- Chair: Mary Maulidi Khembo (from 2025)
- Website: pwcmalawi.org/pwc-home/

The Malawi Parliamentary Women's Caucus is a cross party group of women who are members of Malawi's National Assembly. It was formed in 1996 when there were nine women members of parliament who wanted to work together across parties whenever there was an issue that was related to women. Thirty years later the government strongly supported the caucus.

== History ==
In 1994, Malawi had a new constitution and democracy. The constitution was claimed to be one of the most "gender-sensitive" in the world.

In 1996, there were nine women among the 177 members of Malawi's parliament. The idea of a women's caucus was put forward and the nine politicians put aside their party allegiances to work together. They wanted to make sure that whenever there was an issue that was related to women then they would act together. Lilian Patel was the Minister of Women's and Children's Affairs, Community Development and Social Welfare and she became the first chair of Malawi’s Parliamentary Women’s Caucus. The caucus worked with USAID and the initial relationship was difficult.

In the early years there was good consensus within the caucus and they received good support from ministries. When they advocated change they would emphasize the advantage to "the family" rather than for women. They argued successfully for an increase on family support and despite being teased they argued through a change to the laws of inheritance to criminalize anyone who disinherited surviving wives or children.

There were more women in Malawi's parliament, nearly double, after the 1999 elections and Patel was one of them and she continued to chair the caucus. Women related issues were debated in parliament but there was little related change to the law. Credit can be claimed by the caucus for the 2020 Employment Act which importantly included gender as a basis of unfair discrimination.

The caucus wasn't noted for its support for the 2006 Prevention of Domestic Violence Act and credit went to minister Joyce Banda. Before the 2009 election the "50/50 Campaign" was launched and the caucus members gave it (and their own reelection) their full support. At the election only three of them were re-elected but there were another forty new women MPs which was a large increase.

In 2010 Jean Kalilani took over the chair of the Malawi Parliamentary Women’s Caucus, in 2010, after a difficult time when Anita Kalinde was impeached. Kalilani was appointed as a minister in the following year and Christina Chiwoko became an interim chairperson until Cecilia Chazama was elected. During this period there were several women related acts but the caucus could claim little credit.

In 2017 domestic violence was in the news when seven women were killed or wounded in attacks. Protests and a petition were organised in Lilongwe and Jessie Kabwila, who was the chair of the Women's Parliamentary Caucus was there is support of the protests. During Kabwila's time as chair of the caucus the age of consent in Malawi was raised to eighteen to prevent child marriage.

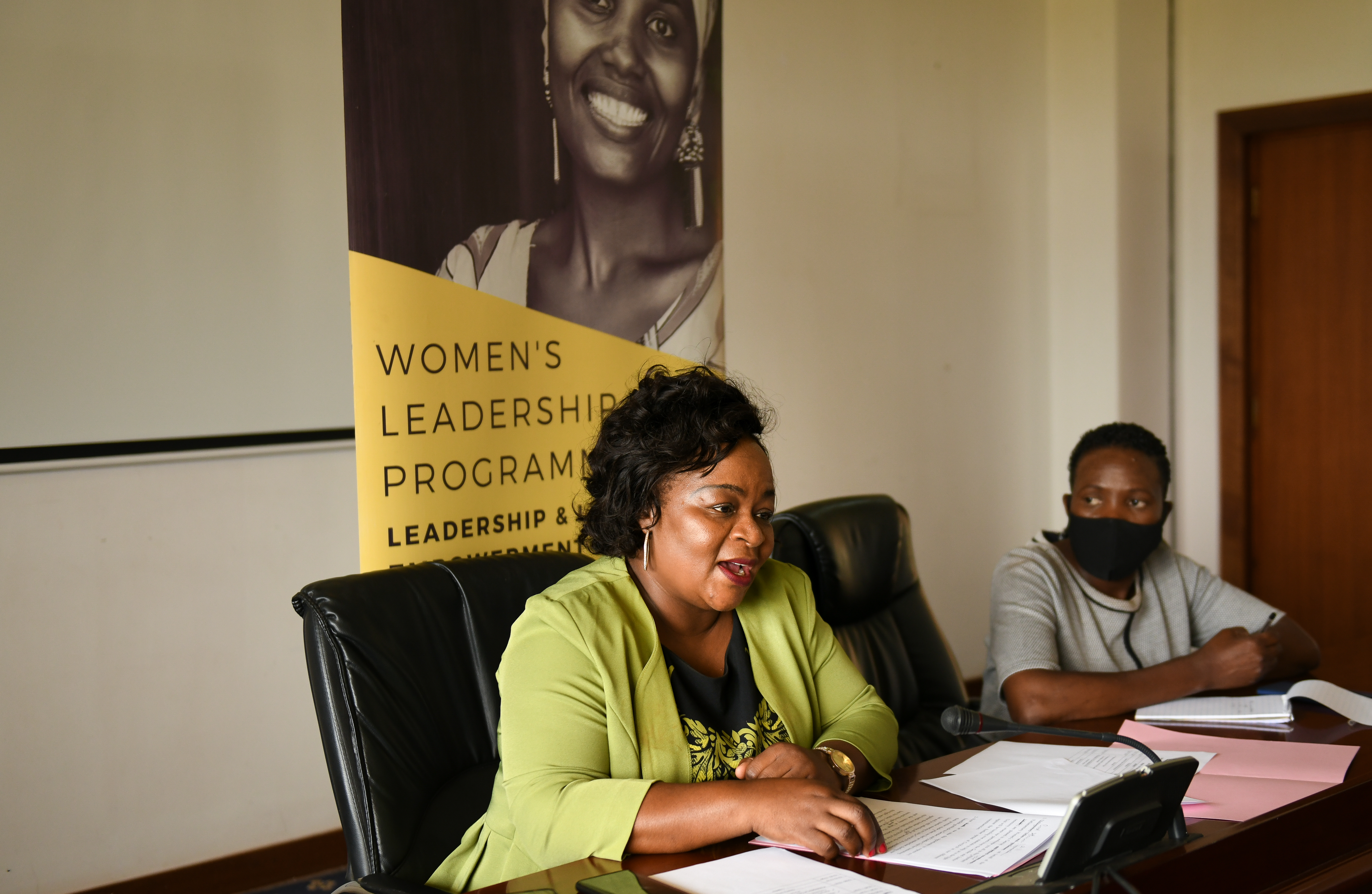
Lonnie Phiri chairing the Parliamentary Women's Caucus during the pandemic in 2020 (photo from GJU)

Lonnie Phiri was a member of the Malawi Parliamentary Women Caucus and in October 2019 she and Liana Chapota came to Scotland for a week to meet Scottish parliamentarians. Lonnie Phiri chaired a fringe meeting at the 2019 Scottish National Party's annual conference.

In 2020, Lonnie Phiri was the elected chair of Malawi's Parliamentary Women Caucus, whose 45 members were still a minority of the male-dominated National Assembly. In 2020 they were encouraged by Oxfam to talk to school children about gender-based violence. In 2021 the caucus were concerned that low ambitions and child marriage was endemic in girls in Malawi's primary schools. Caucus members went to visit schools to encourage the girls to work hard and be ambitious. Phiri wore a copy of the school uniform to make the point that she started in a primary school.

Roseby Gadama became the elected chair of the Malawi Parliamentary Women's Caucus. She had faced tear gas and gunfire protests when she was standing for election in Thondwe and a later study conformed that women candidates faced discrimination during primary elections.

During 2023 the Westminster Centre for Democracy and the Scottish National Party funded a study in collaboration with the Women's caucus. Malawi is one of the four countries on the Scottish government's priority list for partnerships. The study looked at the existing women MPs in the Malawian parliament, their stakeholders, their successes and the barriers they faced in Malawi's society. Each year, the caucus's members have a three day retreat to discuss progress and strategy. The 2023 retreat was in Mangochi and it was funded by the Scottish National Party, Oxfam, the Centre for Civil Society Strengthening and the Westminster Foundation for Democracy.

In February 2024, Gadama visited Edinburgh and she and Chilufya Chileshe attended a meeting of the Scotland Malawi Partnership. Present were Scottish parliamentarians Alasdair Allan and Sarah Boyack and MP Patrick Grady. The meeting heard about the Women's Caucus among other subjects

In the 2025 elections in Malawi, the number of women in parliament increased from 40 to 48, however the total number of seats in the assembly had increased by over 30. The number had increased but the percentage remained a similar figure at about 20%. The MPs included Mary Maulidi Khembo who was a DPP politician representing the Neno South constituency. She was elected to be the new chair of the Women's Caucus in November 2025. She will serve for two years. Grace Kwelepeta became the secretary of the Caucus.

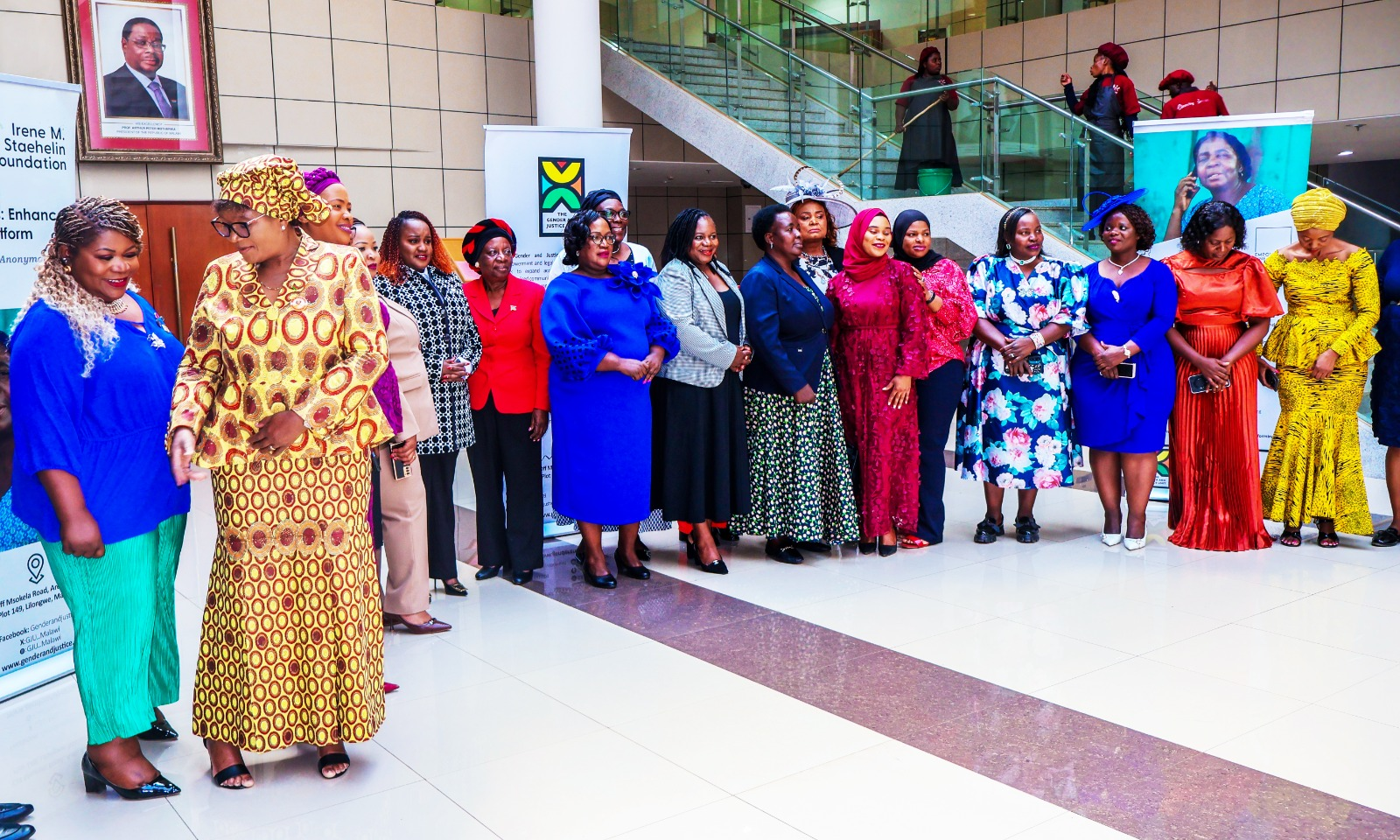
Members of the Parliamentary Women's Caucus in 2026

The caucus's chair, Mary Maulidi Khembo opened a workshop in February 2026 of the caucus, noting the marginal gains made in women's representation in the new parliament. Abiodun Olujimi attended on behalf of the African Women's Leadership network, Fenella Frost represented the UNDP and Fatma Mahomed was from UN Women. In 2026, Esmie Kainja, who was the Secretary for Gender, Children, Disability and Social Welfare spoke of the government's support for the caucus. She noted their shared values and objectives and their efforts to increase gender equality. International comparison of Malawian women in their parliament was given as 23% which was almost exactly equal to the average for the whole of Africa. Other countries like Nigeria are at 4% while Rwanda is about 60% women. The Malawi Parliamentary Women's Caucus were joined by their opposite numbers in Zambia, Mozambique and Zimbabwe in May 2026 (funded by Oxfam). They met in the newly elected Khadija Chunga's constituency. Speakers noted that there was a small increase in the percentage of women MPs in Malawi's parliament and they called on country's electors to create more women MPs - noting that Patricia Kaliati was now serving her fifth term.

== Chairs have included ==
Lilian Patel, Anita Kalinde, Jean Kalilani, Christina Chiwoko, Cecilia Chazama, Jessie Kabwila, Lonnie Phiri, Roseby Gadama and Mary Maulidi Khembo have all been chairs of the caucus.

== See also ==
- Pilirani Buleya
- NGO Gender Coordination Network (NGO GCN)
