= Edda Ella Chitalo =

Malawian politician

- Born: 12 October 1932 (age 94); Blantyre
- Citizenship: Malawi
- Education: Henry Henderson Institute
- Occupation: Politician

Edda Ella Chitalo (born 1932) is a Malawian teacher and politician. She was the Parliamentary Secretary for Health and later a minister with a number of portfolios.

== Life ==
Edda Chitalo was born on 12 October 1932 at Mlanga Village in Blantyre, and raised in the Blantyre Mission established by the Church of Scotland. She attended primary school at Blantyre Girls' School, completing the Standard V examination in 1947. After further study at the Henry Henderson Institute and the girls' school, she passed the Primary School Leaving Certificate Examination in 1949. She continued at the Women's Teacher Training College, where her mother and grandmother had been taught by Miss Beck. She qualified as a teacher in 1951. Chitalo taught at Blantyre Girls' school, where she was later headmistress. By 1962 she had qualified as a domestic science teacher from the Emily McPherson College of Domestic Economy in Melbourne, Australia. In 1970 she was promoted to the level of T2 teacher.

In the 1971 Malawian general election Chitalo became MP as the nominated Malawi Congress Party member for Blantyre. From 1971 to 1975 she was a Parliamentary Secretary for Health. In the early 1980s Chitalo was expelled from the Malawi Congress Party. Forced to give up her parliamentary seat, she retired from active politics for several years. In the multiparty 1994 Malawian general election Chitalo stood as a United Democratic Front candidate for the Blantyre City South-East constituency. She won the seat with 14,993 votes, 80.46% of votes cast. From 1994 to 1996 she was Minister of State for Women's and Children's Affairs. She was among Malawi's delegation to the 1995 World Conference on Women in Beijing. After briefly being Minister of Community Development and Social Welfare in 1996, she was Minister of Physical Planning and Surveys in 1996–97. Between 1997 and 2003 she was a Minister of State in the Office of the President and in the Cabinet responsible for Human Resources Management and Development.

Edda Chitalo retired from politics in the early 2000s.

In 2024 the Malawian President, Lazarus Chakwera, invited her to the Presidential home, Kamuzu Palace, in Lilongwe. It is said that she chose the location where the palace was built in about 1976, after being asked by Hastings Banda, when he was the first President.
