= Keith Somerville =

British journalist and author (1957–2024)

Keith Somerville (27 January 1957 – 19 September 2024) was a British journalist and author, known for his work on African politics and history, and, in later years, wildlife conservation. From 2013 until his death, he was a Senior Research Fellow at the Institute of Commonwealth Studies at the University of London. and a Professor at the Centre for Journalism at the University of Kent. Somerville was a member of the Durrell Institute of Conservation, a member of the IUCN Sustainable Use and Livelihoods Specialist Group, a Fellow of the Zoological Society of London, and a fellow of the Royal Historical Society.

== Education ==
From 1975 to 1978, Somerville completed a BSc in International Politics at the University of Southampton. Then, from 1978 to 1979, at Aberystwyth University, he studied Soviet support for African liberation movements.

== Career ==
=== Journalism ===
Somerville began his career as a journalist with BBC Monitoring in Africa, monitoring foreign radio broadcasts for eight years from 1980. According to an interview with Dr Sue Onslow from the Institute of Commonwealth Studies, this was motivated by his interest in "Soviet theory and Soviet practice of supporting national liberation movements in Southern Africa." Returning to Britain, he worked at the BBC World Service from 1988 to 2005.

=== Author ===
For his book on the history of the ivory trade, Ivory: Power and Poaching in Africa, he jointly won the Marjan-Marsh Award in 2016 with Stephane Crayne. He later wrote on the exploitation and conservation of rhinos in Africa's Threatened Rhinos: A History of Exploitation and Conservation, published posthumously in January 2025.

=== Academia and teaching ===
Somerville was a Senior Research Fellow at the Institute of Commonwealth Studies at the University of London and a Professor at the Centre for Journalism at the University of Kent from 2013 until his death in 2024.
