= Ricardo Garcia (Spanish musician) =

Spanish guitarist

Ricardo Garcia is a Spanish guitarist, leader of the group Flamenco Flow, who is known for his interpretations of Flamenco blended with other musical forms.

== Birth and education ==
Garcia was born in France in 1966 of an Andalusian family. Both his father's family and his mother's family moved to France during the Franco era. His family was musical, and he was taught to play guitar by his uncle Antonio when he was very young. He learned to accompany his mother singing Maria del Carmen. Garcia appeared in his first concert at the age of nine, and since then he performed alone or with his aunt and uncle in all parts of France. In 1988 he was selected to represent France on a cultural tour of Uruguay and Argentina sponsored by the Casa de America Latina. Garcia studied flamenco under Merengue de Cordoba, Paco Serrano and Jose Antonio Rodrigues Munoz between the ages of 15 and 18, while also studying classical guitar. During this period, he fronted a Pat Metheny jazz concert in Paris.

== Performing artist ==
Garcia worked in Malawi, Africa for eight years, coming into contact with musicians with very different musical backgrounds. He learned to incorporate African and Indian elements in his repertoire. He worked closely with Aaron Sangala and Tione Mwera, and collaborated with sitar player and economist Bimal K Lodh in several concerts. Ricardo was the founder of the group Kalulu with Aaron Sangala and Bashir Sacranie. While in Malawi, he often performed solo or with others at the French Cultural centre, The British Council and the University of Malawi. He married Julie Gunn, a language educator from the United Kingdom, when they were both living in Malawi.

Garcia returned to Europe in 1999 and settled in Barcelona. Julie Gunn became his manager in 2001. He performs worldwide as well as in Spain, France and in Scotland, where he has played in the Edinburgh Festival for nineteen years running. He has performed in many other countries in Europe, Asia, Africa and North America. He regularly tours East Africa and has worked there supported by the Spanish Embassy on various tours. He toured to Montreal and Vancouver in 2005–8, and performed in many locations in the USA. From May 8–19, 2006, Garcia was Artist-in-Residence with his group Flamenco Flow at the State Theater, New Brunswick, New Jersey. This led him and Julie to change the nature of their work: incorporating community work, children's workshops and free performances in areas where people can't attend the main paid shows due to geographical or financial constraints.

He has added an educational element to his body of work, teaching residencies at firstly the Dhow Countries Music Academy in Zanzibar, sponsored by the Spanish Embassy, with additional support from SWISS and the Serena Hotel group. More recently in 2017 he taught a residency in the Department of Ethnomusicology at the University of Washington in Seattle. He presented two masterclasses there in January 2020.

He has composed music for the Bollywood movie Tashan in Mumbai, India and has played for two MTV India Unplugged programmes, under the direction of Ranjit Barot.

He has toured Japan twice with saxophonist Yuichiro Tokuda - who he met at the Amman Jazz Festival. Completing the trio in Japan is Masaki Otawa on Taiko and percussion - a CD was recorded in Japan and will launch in 2020.

== Musical style ==
Garcia's performances incorporate flamenco styles that range from free-flowing Alegrías and tangos to the emotive tientos and soleas. Talking of a 2009 performance with Spanish guitarist Eduardo Niebla and India tabla-player Dharmesh Parmar, a critic noted that he contributed Arabic influences to the performances. His ensemble of musicians and dancers also incorporates elements from Indian, African, South American and Caribbean music. Their work shows modern influences such as jazz, Latin jazz, bossa nova, and salsa. According to the Only magazine, he has forged "a unique and devastatingly original, awe-inspiring sound". At the 2010 Edinburgh Festival Fringe, Garcia created a unique blend of Flamenco and Hip-Hop.

== Partial discography ==
- 2004 Set Luna (Julia Sarr, vocalist)
- 2006 Flamenco Flow
- 2007 Flamenco con Fusion
