= Jean Kalilani =

Malawian politician

Honourable Jean Kalilani MP
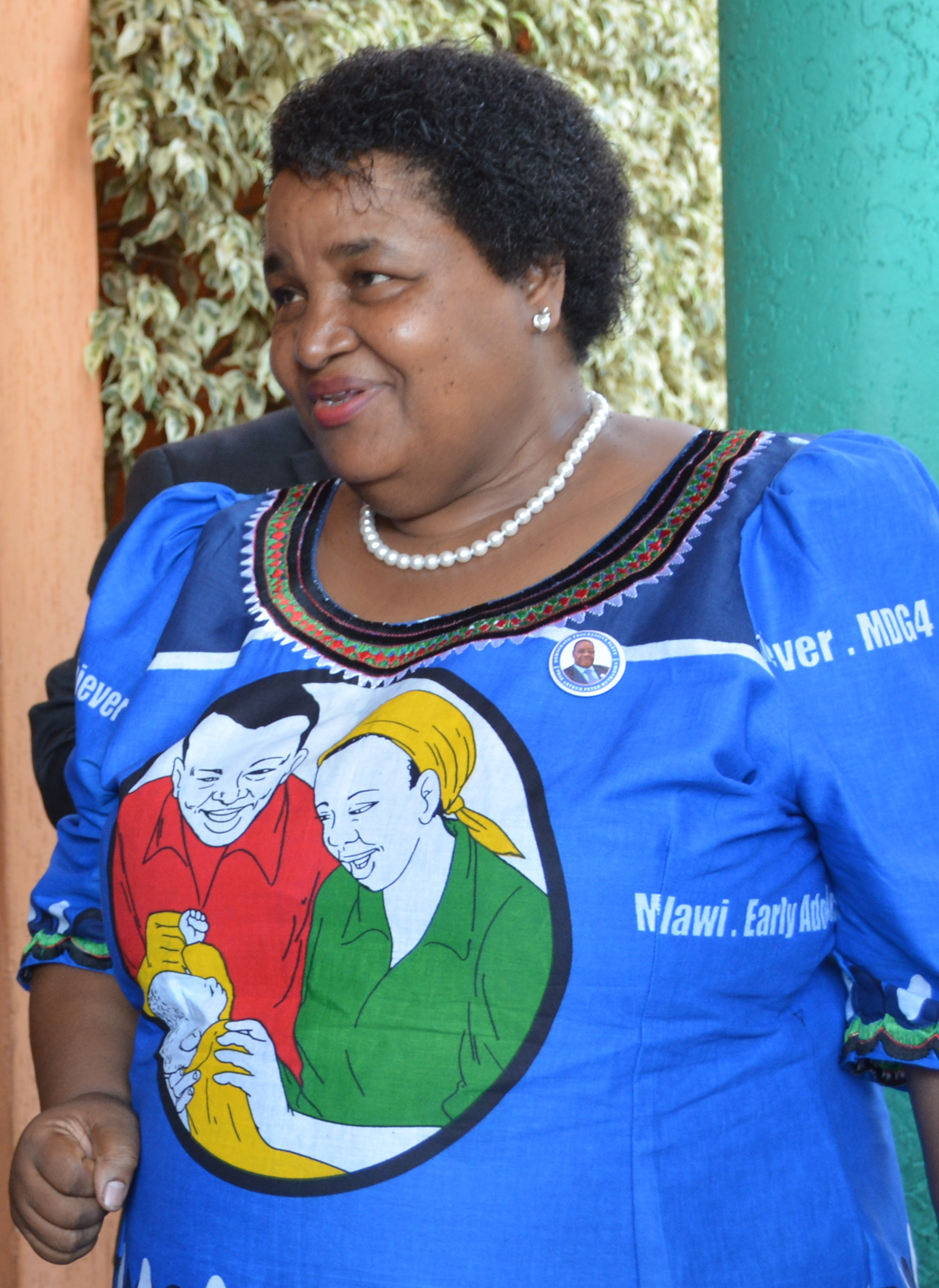
- in 2015

Minister of Gender, Children, Disability and Social Welfare
- Incumbent
- Assumed office 17 June 2017
- President: Peter Mutharika

Member of Parliament for Dowa Central
- Incumbent
- Assumed office ?

Personal details
- Party: Democratic Progressive Party
- Occupation: politician

Jean Alfazema Nachika Kalilani is a Malawian politician who has served in the Cabinet of Malawi as Minister of Home Affairs and Internal Security since 2015. Previously she was Minister of Health from 2014 to 2015. She is also the Secretary General of the Democratic Progressive Party (DPP) and second term Member of Parliament for Dowa Central Constituency.

== Life ==
Kalilani is said to have decided to become a doctor at the age of three when she noticed a large queue of people waiting to see a doctor outside Queen Elizabeth Hospital. She was raised in Blantyre by her middle class parents. She was undeterred when she was told that she could not be a doctor because she was not a man and there was nowhere to become qualified in Malawi. She gained her first degree at Chancellor College. She studied medicine in Marseille in France where she became a doctor of medicine and achieved a master’s degree in tropical medicine at Emory University.

She worked for the World Health Organization in Botswana as a country representative.

In 2010 she was elected to chair of Malawi Parliamentary Women's Caucus, in 2010, after a difficult time when Anita Kalinde was impeached. It was suspected that Anita Kalinde who was Joyce Banda's niece had used the position to forward their political ambitions. Kalilani was appointed as a minister in the following year and Christina Chiwoko became an interim chairperson until Cecilia Chazama was elected.

After DPP candidate Peter Mutharika was elected President, he appointed Kalilani as Minister of Health in June 2014. She was moved to the post of Minister of Home Affairs and Internal Security in August 2015.

Kalilani had been elected to be the DPP's Secretary General. She was replaced in 2014 by order of the DPP's executive committee by Ecrain Julius Kudontoni.

In 2016 she was the Minister for gender, disability and social welfare. The government had passed a number of related acts of legislation so Kalilani worked with the ministry of rural affairs to organise a meeting of lady chiefs. Over two days they were encouraged to use their social capital to publicise this legislation and to encourage others to challenge traditions.

She was invited by the African Union in 2017 to take the lead on gender for an African Union meeting. In the following year she organised celebrations for International Women's Day involving the first lady Gertrude Mutharika and concentrating on women in the countryside. The progress of Malawi on gender was encouraged by the UN's representative Clara Anyangwe and Kalilani was invited to New York to discuss gender related issues at the United Nations.

== Private life ==
Kalilani is the mother of six of her own children including recording artist and aspiring politician Tay Grin. She became a parent to twenty nieces and nephews after their parents died.
