= Emmie Chanika =

Malawian human rights activist (1956–2022)

- Born: 26 May 1956
- Died: 29 July 2022 (aged 66)
- Citizenship: Malawi
- Occupation: Nurse
- Known for: Founded the Civil Liberties Committee (CILIC)
- Notable work: Malawi Lost Decade 1994–2004 (Co‑authored with historian Adamson Sinjani Muula)

Emmie Takomana Chanika (26 May 1956 – 29 July 2022) was a Malawian nurse with the Red Cross before she became a human rights activist. She founded the Civil Liberties Committee.

== Life ==
Chanika was born in 1956. She was the fifth child of Irene Naliyela Chiphal and Moses Takomana.

She trained and worked as a registered nurse and took work with the Red Cross Blood Transfusion service where she was in time a manager. From 1988 the Red Cross began to speak out about human rights.

Chanika began working in 1992 as human rights groups started to form and agitate for political change in Malawi which at the time suffered under the dictatorship of Hastings Kamuzu Banda. Emmie Chanika then founded the Civil Liberties Committee (CILIC), which was established in February 1992 as the first human rights organization in Malawi. Chanika has been its executive director until 2017 when its funding failed. Under the banner of CILIC Chanika has been actively involved in the 1993 Referendum and the 1994 general election Civic Education which led to major democratic change and the end of Hastings Kamuzu Banda's dictatorship in Malawi. Although a trained registered nurse, Emmie Chanika continued to educate herself and among other qualifications obtained her Master of Science degree in Strategic Planning in 2007.

In 1995 the first democratic President of Malawi, Bakili Muluzi appointed Chanika to sit on the Mwanza Murders Commission, where former State President Hastings Kamuzu Banda, his right-hand man John Tembo, and confidante Ms. Cecelia Kadzamira were accused of masterminding the assassination of three cabinet ministers and a member of parliament.

In the years that followed, Emmie Chanika has been a notable women's and children's rights activist, facing intimidation, threats and even physical violence. Many women and children in distress have found their way to the CILIC offices in Blantyre and have received counselling, legal aid and professional advice. Besides promoting democratic values and addressing politically motivated violence Emmie Chanika has also been an early advocate of prison reform in Malawi.

In May 2003, she joined other women's rights activists in denouncing Malawi President Bakili Muluzi's habit of publicly making sexist comments against women. "It is sad to note the president insults women in the presence of his wife, the clergy and leaders of the Muslim society," said Chanika.

Chanika continued to be one of the most courageous and influential human rights activists in Malawi and has also been one of the founding members of the human rights consultative forum HRCC. In the 2011 political crisis in Malawi which saw many Malawians taking to the street in anger with president Bingu Wa Mutharika's oppressive policies Chanika has taken a moderate stance. She has been calling for calm and for dialogue rather than confrontation. This stance has prompted accusations that she is now on the payroll of the Malawi government. Nevertheless, these accusations appear unfounded as Emmie Chanika has continued to be vocal in her criticism of the Malawi government. Emmie Chanika disclosed in a recent interview that her organization CILIC has almost folded because since HIVOS stopped funding CILIC in 2008 it has not received any support from international donors. It appears that CILIC has also been undermined by the government and new civil society organizations who compete for access to donor funds. In spite of lack of funding Chanika was still an active human rights activist and spoke out on the issue of unscrupulous clergy and traditional religious experts labelling children, the handicapped and the elderly as witches.

In 2008 her work was recognised by the University of Surrey whose International Care Ethics (ICE) Observatory awarded her an Human Rights and Nursing Award. The citation noted a lot of her work including serving with the "Malawi Red Cross on the Commission to investigate the deaths of four politicians, alongside Rafiq Hajat."

== Publications ==
Chanika wrote a book on Violence against Women and co-authored two books with medical historian Adamson Sinjani Muula called, Malawi Lost Decade 1994–2004.

== Death and legacy ==
Patricia Kaliati when she was Minister for Gender in 2020 publicly thanked women's rights activists in Malawi. She named Chanika in a list that also included, Reen Kachere, Faustace Chirwa, Margaret Ali, Emma Kaliya, Mercy Timba and Jean Nkwanda.

On 29 July 2022, Emmie Chanika died at the age of 66 after struggling with a stroke.
