= Nicholas Dausi =

Malawian politician

Nicholas Dausi is a Malawian politician. He served the Hastings Banda government in "several capacities" as a collaborator of Banda. Dausi was "accused of withholding information on atrocities committed during the dictatorship", after he himself publicly stated that he had evidence which could help in successfully convicting those who were accused of committing various atrocities during Dr. Banda's rule; but was freed on bail. He has also served as publicist and Vice President of the Malawi Congress Party (MCP). He was Deputy Minister for Presidential Affairs in 2010.
