= Yarico =

- Music: James McConnell
- Lyrics: Carl Miller with additional lyrics by Paul Leigh
- Book: Carl Miller
- Basis: Inkle and Yarico by George Colman the Younger
- Productions: 2016 London Theatre Workshop

Yarico is a musical based on the 18th century comic opera Inkle and Yarico. It tells the 17th-century story of an Amerindian woman, Yarico, who saved the life of, and subsequently fell in love with, British merchant Thomas Inkle, who then sold her into slavery on the island of Barbados. The story was first recorded by Richard Ligon, in his book entitled The True and Exact History of the Island of Barbadoes (1657). Ever since its first staging by George Colman the Younger in 1787, the story became hugely popular, inspiring writers across Europe as well as in America, to produce a number of different treatments of it. The music is by James McConnel, and the book and lyrics are by Carl Miller with additional lyrics by Paul Leigh. The musical played at the London Theatre Workshop from February 17, to March 28, 2015

== Synopsis ==
Early 1700s, on an island in The Antilles

ACT ONE

Early 1700s, on an island in The Antilles. Yarico, a young Amerindian woman, gazes out to sea, longing for something to change her monotonous village life (“There is a Land”). Thomas Inkle, a young, white British man is washed ashore, barely alive. He bemoans the greed and gambling which have caused his fate (“Silver and Gold”), but the discovery that his friend Cicero, a young black British dandy, has also survived leads him to promise to lead a better life (“Sailing to the Indies”). Yarico and her friend Nono fall for Thomas and Cicero respectively, but other islanders trap Thomas and debate whether to kill him in retribution for a previous European massacre of their people (“Ghost Man”). Yarico frees Thomas, disobeying the village.

At Bridgetown, Barbados, news of the two stranded Englishmen inspires a rescue mission, funded by tavern proprietor Polly Pennywell, Back on Yarico's island, Thomas recovers his strength in an isolated cave, tended by Yarico. He asks her to teach him some of her language (“The Lesson”) while Nono and Cicero let their passion for each other overcome their mutual incomprehension (“Hammock”). Thomas tells Yarico she has set him free from the cave of his old life (“The Cave”). Both couples face separation when an English ship arrives, but Yarico and Nono decide to leave home with their lovers, seen by the village Watchman (“Farewell, Yarico”).

On board ship, the sailors take advantage of Thomas's gambling obsession and when he faces ruin provoke him to stake his own wife in “The Dice Game”. He loses, and Yarico becomes the property of the ship. Yarico and Nono wake to their first sight of Barbados, thrilled and unaware of the night's events (“Sailing to the Indies”) until Yarico is taken away.

At the dock, Yarico is sold at auction. Slaves in the woods around sing to try to give her hope (“Spirit Eternal”), but no-one can prevent her becoming the property of Governor Worthy and his wife.

ACT TWO

Bartholomew, one of the slaves preparing an escape from the island, inspires other slaves with righteous anger (“Give Me My Name”) but Yarico is too crushed even to eat or drink. Polly Pennywell takes pity on Nono and Cicero, but they reject Thomas, who returns to London in despair. Lady Worthy adopts Yarico as her favourite, to the irritation of her house slave Jessica. Jessica and an Irish indentured labourer, Frank, fall for each other as they evoke memories of the lands from which they have been driven (“Take a Step”). At a party given by Lady Worthy where the planters and their wives gossip about relationships between white men and black women (“Chocolate”), Yarico collapses while made to recite Shakespeare to the guests. Recognising that Yarico is pregnant, an older slave woman, Ma Cuffe, encourages her to live for the hope her child may bring (“Things We Carry With Us”). The slaves’ brutal work of creating the island's wealth from sugar continues (“Cane, Cane, Sugar Cane”).

When her child is born, Yarico rejects it and remains despairing, until, witnessing the public flogging of Frank and Jessica for miscegenation, she decides to embrace the child and throw in her lot with the rebels (“The Same and Not The Same”). She proposes the plan take advantage of her favoured position with the Worthys and encourages Lady Worthy to invite the island's planters to a ‘cultural evening’ on the night of the escape. As plans for that event and the escape hot up, Thomas returns and offers to buy Yarico's freedom (“Silver and Gold”) but she rejects him decisively.

On the night of the escape, Jessica, broken by destitution and her punishment, reveals the plan in the hope of winning back some favour with the Worthys. The Governor and those militia not away trying to repel a French incursion pursue the escaping slaves through the woods. Only a fire set between the escapees and their pursuers allows Bartholomew and others to get to their rafts and the sea in time. As Yarico and her child run across the beach, Thomas carries the exhausted Ma Cuffe to safety. It was him who set the fire and there is a moment between him and Yarico when he learns she has named her child after him. The island militia start shooting, killing Thomas, and Yarico and her baby have to flee to the rafts to survive. As she journeys to freedom, Yarico tries to forget Thomas (“Forget”).

On an island beach, much like the one from which she looked out to sea as a young woman years before, Yarico promises her child the story of how they came to freedom (“Spirit Eternal”).

== Production ==
Current version of the story, developed by Carl Miller, has been directed by Emily Gray, with choreography by Jeanefer Jean-Charles. The musical's set, and costumes (Sarah Beaton) have been largely influenced by the Caribbean plantation look to emphasize the origins of the story. Music (James McConnell – composer; Zara Nunn – Musical Director, orchestrator) however, is a fusion blend of tribal, jazz, blues and Celtic influences. Running time is approximately 2 hours 20 minutes including a 20-minute interval. The musical was originally staged at the London Theatre Workshop in Fulham, London, with graphic design by Pete Shaw. A television documentary of the story is planned by the musical production company.

== Educational programme ==
Yarico Productions is working in collaboration with an arts and education organisation Trestle, to design a telling of the story custom made for schools, in a workshop format.

Trestle deliver over 200 workshops a year engaging up to 4000 students, and this year developed an educational programme, which will extend the reach of Yarico's story and the issues it addresses – such as gender equality, race, and cultural diversity, among others. The programme includes workshops and educational resources for schools, which provide teachers and students with the skills, and inspiration to explore and understand important social issues. Participants also learn about the techniques used in the theatre production (Yarico).

== Musical numbers ==
Act I

- “A Land Elsewhere” – Yarico
- “Ghost Men” – Company
- “The Lesson” – Thomas and Yarico
- “Hammock” – Cicero and Nono
- “The Cave” – Thomas and Yarico
- “Yarico Farewell” – Watchman
- “The Dice Game” – Company
- “Sailing to The Indies” – Nono and Yarico
- “Spirit Eternal” – Company

Act II

- “Give Me My Name” – Bartholomew and Company
- “Take a Step” – Frank, Jessica and Company
- “Chocolate” – Company
- “The Things We Carry With Us” – Ma Cuffe
- “The Same And Not The Same” – Yarico
- “Silver And Gold” – Thomas
- “Forget” – Yarico
- “Spirit Eternal” – Company

== Cast and characters ==
The following table gives the principal casting information for the major productions of Yarico.

Productions	Yarico	Thomas Inkle	Nono	Cicero	Ma Cuffe
2016 UK Premiere	Liberty Buckland	Alex Spinney	Tori Allen-Martin	Jean-Luke Worrell	Melanie Marshall

Note: in the case of the 2016 UK Premiere, casting also included Michael Moulton, Keisha Amponsa Banson, Michael Mahony, Suzanne Ahmet, Adam Vaughan and Charlotte E Hamblin.

== Critical reception ==
The musical has been well received by the audiences and critics. Paul Vale from TheStage, praised the show, stating: “Exceptional first outing for a promising new British musical”. Remote Goat reviewer, Aline Wates, was particularly impressed with the execution of a number of themes within the story: “I have never been moved so much by a musical, the themes of slavery and diversity of race, gender and culture are powerfully expressed”. Grumpy Gay Critic, James Waygood stated: “A wonderful new musical that is as poignant as it is as easy to be swept away by. Captivating and unexpected, Yarico is unbound excellence”. The show's educational potential has been recognized by a Broadway World reviewer, Gary Naylor, who stated: “One can easily see how this show could be adapted for schools”.

Some of the negative comments about the show can be found in the British Theatre Guide review of the show, stating: “The script could still do with some polishing, but this is a show full of energy and sounds that outweigh any shortcomings”. Everything Theatre reviewer, Helen Dalton, indicated there is not too many powerful songs: “Three of the musical pieces stand out in my mind as strong, memorable and rousing, but the majority of the others I found lacking in power”. Ginger Hibiscus critic, Howard Loyton, stated: “There’s a sense of frustration in the outcome of the story – though the ending is such a stunningly emotive piece of theatre that you’re halfway home before you realise that you never found out what actually happened”
