= Kamuzu Palace =

- Interactive map of the Kamuzu Palace area
- Former names: New State House
- Alternative names: State House (Lilongwe)

General information
- Type: Presidential residence
- Architectural style: Persian-style brick (with modern additions)
- Location: Area 44, Lilongwe, Malawi
- Coordinates: 13.9631°S 33.8517°E
- Opened: 1975; 51 years ago
- Owner: Government of Malawi

Technical details
- Grounds: ~200-acre estate (~555 ha by some sources)

Other information
- Number of rooms: ~300 air-conditioned rooms

Kamuzu Palace (formerly the New State House) is the official residence of the President of the Republic of Malawi, located in Lilongwe. Built by Hastings Kamuzu Banda in 1975, it is one of the largest and most symbolically significant state buildings in the country.

== History ==
Kamuzu Palace was constructed in 1975 during the presidency of Hastings Kamuzu Banda. The structure was built in a Persian-inspired brick architectural style, and the surrounding estate covers roughly 200 acres, with facilities such as a supermarket, school, and residential quarters for staff.

Although Banda oversaw its completion, he reportedly stayed there only briefly. His successor, Bakili Muluzi, declined to occupy the palace, describing it as an “obscene extravagance". In 2004, President Bingu wa Mutharika fully occupied the palace, moving in after his election and declaring it his official residence.

In the 2010s, former president Joyce Banda renamed the building Kamuzu Palace to honor Dr. Hastings Banda, the nation's founding president.

== Site selection and early planning ==
Edda Ella Chitalo then serving as Malawi's Minister of Physical Planning and Surveys, was tasked in the 1970s with selecting the location for the palace. She chose the current site outside Lilongwe for its strategic and symbolic significance. In 2024, she was recognized by President Lazarus Chakwera for her role in the palace's early planning and site selection.

== Recent events ==
Following the 2025 presidential elections, several media reports alleged that Kamuzu Palace had been vandalized and looted. Items including furniture, appliances, and fittings were reportedly missing, while walls and floors had been defaced and damaged.

== Significance ==
Kamuzu Palace remains a central symbol of post-independence Malawi, representing both national pride and political controversy. It embodies the legacy of Dr. Banda's leadership and the ongoing debates about governance, transparency, and the cost of maintaining national monuments.
