= Patricia Kaliati =

Malawian politician and former educator

Patricia Kaliati MP
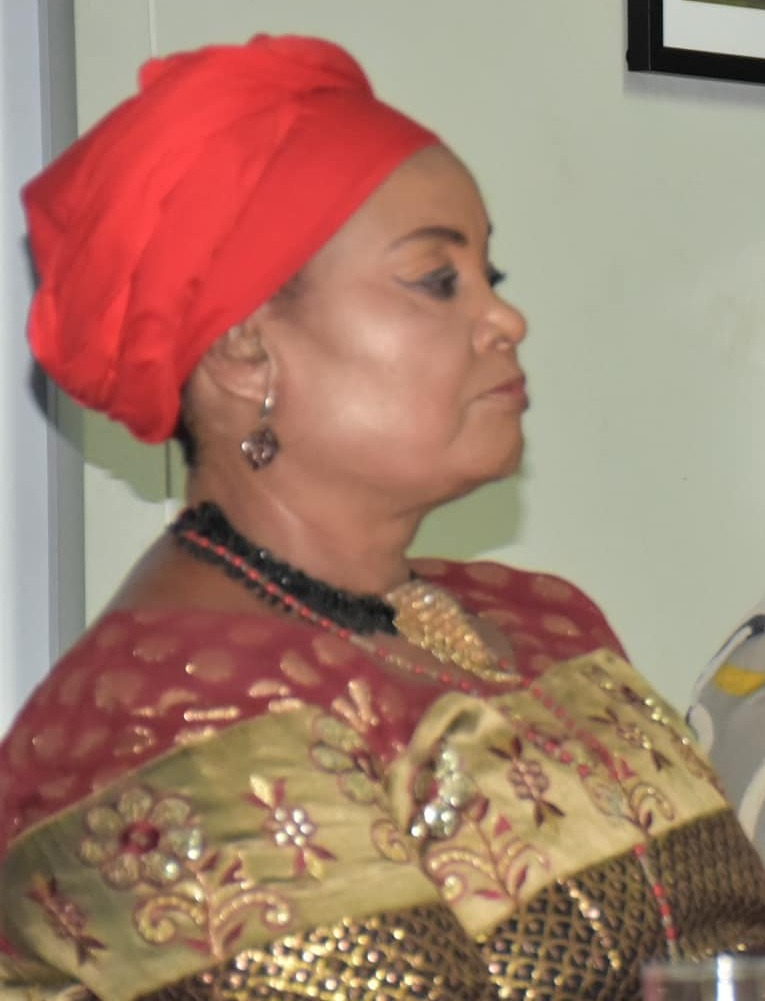

Former Member of Parliament Mulanje West
- In office 19 May 1999 – 23 May 2019
- Succeeded by: Yusuf Witness Ntheda

Minister of Information and Tourism
- In office May 2007 – May 2009
- President: Bingu wa Mutharika

Minister of Gender, Children and Community Development
- In office 15 June 2009 – 9 August 2010
- President: Bingu wa Mutharika

Minister of Information and Civic Education
- In office 11 September 2011 – 10 April 2012
- President: Bingu wa Mutharika
- Succeeded by: Moses Kunkuyu

Personal details
- Born: 1967 (age 58–59)
- Party: United Transformation Movement (2018-Present) Democratic Progressive Party (2005-2018); United Democratic Front (pre-2005)
- Children: 4
- Education: Azteca University
- Occupation: Politician
- Profession: Teacher

Patricia Annie Kaliati is a Malawian politician and former educator who has held various ministerial positions in the Cabinet of Malawi including Minister of Gender. In 2024 she was the Secretary General of the opposition United Transformation Movement, she was arrested before the impending national election. She was elected again in 2025 and she became her party's parliamentary leader.

== Early life and education ==
Kaliati was born in 1967 in the village Nkando, Mulanje, Southern Region, Malawi. She trained as a teacher in 1988 receiving a Primary School Teaching Certificate from Bembeke Teachers College and later obtained a Diploma in Human Resource Management. Upon completion of her formal education, she taught in primary and secondary schools from 1993 to 1999. She is a staunch Catholic. She later credited women's rights activists in Malawi for inspiring her to be ambitious. She later named Faustace Chirwa, Margaret Ali, Emmie Chanika, Emma Kaliya, Reen Kachere, Barbara Banda and Maggie Kathewera Banda, Mercy Timba and Jean Nkwanda in 2020.

== Political career ==
In the 1999 general election Patricia Kaliati was elected Member of Parliament for Mulanje West Constituency on a United Democratic Front ticket, a position she continues to hold. In 2000 she was appointed Deputy Minister of Health to the Bakili Muluzi administration. Kaliati was then shuffled to Deputy Minister of National Public Events (2002–2004) and then Deputy Minister of Local Government. She was re-elected in 2004 and was appointed Minister of Information and Tourism, renamed Minister of Information and Civic Education in May 2007, holding that position until May 2009.

In the May 2009 elections Patricia Kaliati was again elected on the Democratic Progressive Party ticket. Kaliati was appointed Minister of Gender, Children and Community Development in the cabinet that became effective on 15 June 2009. She was dropped from the cabinet on 9 August 2010. She was appointed Minister of Information and Civic Education in September 2011.

In 2014 a case against her brought by the Anti-Corruption Bureau and supported by then Director of Public Prosecutions, Rosemary Kanyuka, was dropped. It had been claimed that Kaliati had taken bribes while serving as Minister of Tourism but no charges were progressed.

At the beginning of 2022 a new cabinet was announced which included Kaliati as the minister of Gender, Community Development & Social Welfare. Agness Nkusa Nkhoma was not mentioned but a later list appeared, with an apology, and Nkorna was named as Kaliati's deputy.

Kaliati was said to be a potential presidential candidate after the death of her party's leader in a plane crash. She was the Secretary General of the opposition United Transformation Movement (UTM) when in October 2024, Kaliati was arrested and charged with "conspiring with others to commit a serious offence" amid rumours of a plot to assassinate President Lazarus Chakwera. Political motives for the arrest were suggested. The Malawi Human Rights Defenders Coalition (HRDC) spokesperson spoke out against her arbitrary detention.

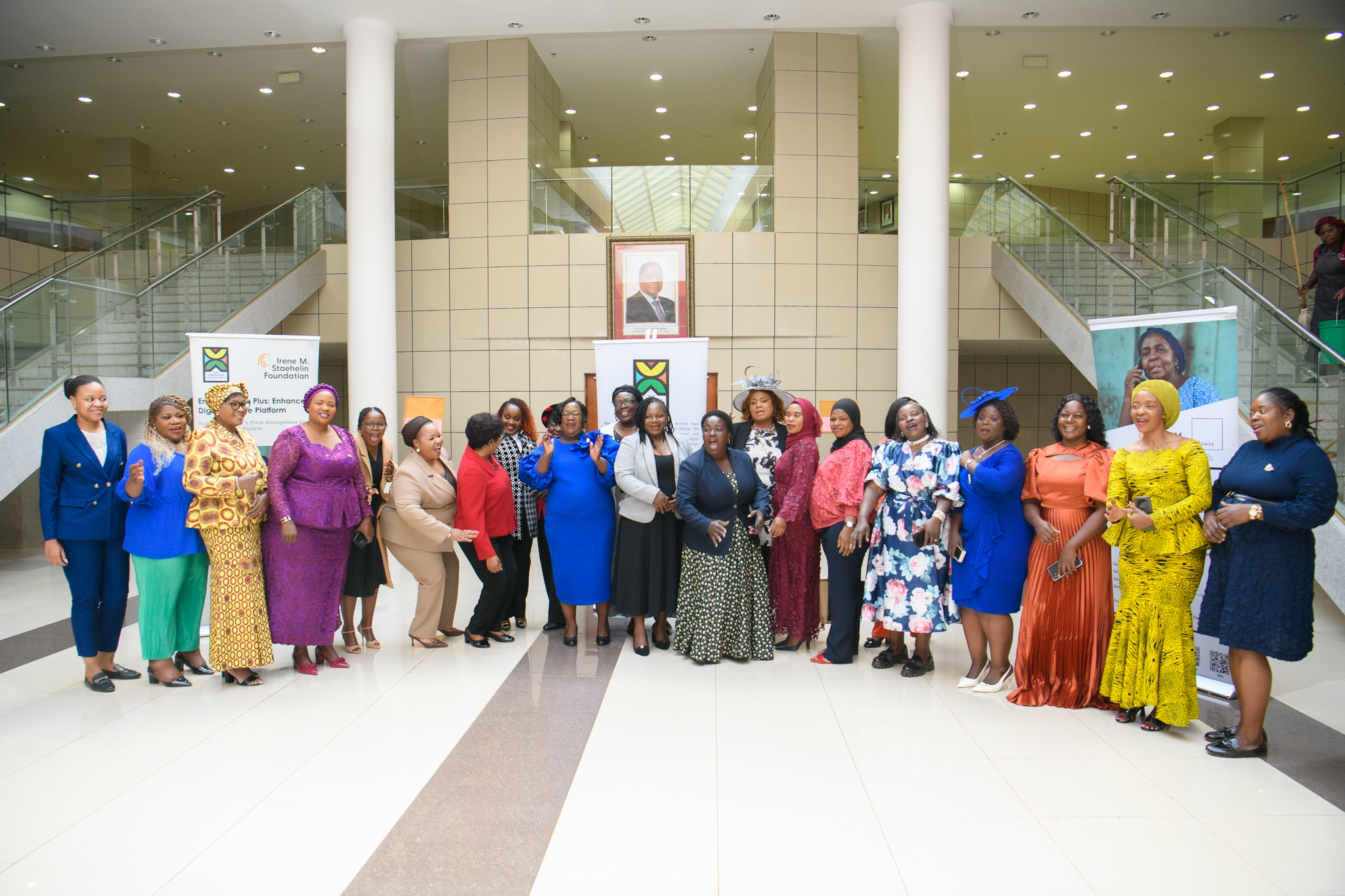
Members of the Malawi Parliamentary Women's Caucus with Kaliati (in hat) in the centre

In October 2025 following the general election, the United Transformation Party was the third largest party in Malawi's parliament. Kaliati was again an MP and she was elected to be the party's leader in parliament with Kenneth Ndovie as her deputy. She called her re-election a blessing when she was sworn in by Fiona Kalemba. Kaliati represented Mulanje West and she was pleased that parliament had decided to make secondary education free in 2026. There are nine constituencies in Mulanje District and in 2025 all but two of them were represented by men. Four prospective women candidates lost and only Marium Ajida and Kaliati were elected.

In November 2025, as Leader of Parliament for UTM, Kaliati called on the Minister of Homeland Security Peter Mukhito to launch a fresh investigation into the 10 June 2024 aircraft crash in the Chikangawa Forest Reserve that killed former Vice-President Saulos Chilima and eight others. She argued that despite the previous inquiry and German expert review, Malawians remained unsatisfied and urged accountability for continued loss of key personnel. She was optimistic that an investigation would be funded in the following February and she spoke out in defence of Mary Chilima who had attracted comment about her mourning.

Kaliati was a member of the Public Accounts Committee which also includes Susan Dossi, Amina Kajiya and Ireen Mambala. That committee conducted a Special Public Inquiry into the Purchase of the Amaryllis Hotel by the Public Service Pension Trust Fund. Their report was published in March 2026 and it found numerous failings and that the sale broke the "fundamental principles that govern the management of [a] public pension asset".

== Controversy ==
Kaliati has been an outspoken and controversial member of the cabinet. In February 2012 Kaliati condemned the Weekend Times (former) tabloid for its page 8 "Action Girl", which she described as pornographic and misogynistic. In 1999, Kaliati reportedly used government funds to provide education bursaries for children of her key supporters and to help win election in Mulanje in 2009. The subsequent investigation of Kaliati by Malawi's Anti Corruption Bureau was stalled in response to political influence.

In March 2012 she was accused of threatening a journalist who had written an article critical of her performance in the cabinet. After the death of President Bingu wa Mutharika on 5 April 2012, she was involved in a constitutional crisis in Malawi and was dubbed as one of the 'midnight six'. On 6 April 2012 Kaliati addressed a press conference as government spokesperson, saying that Vice President Joyce Banda "is not eligible to take over the leadership of this country because she formed her own party". Banda was sworn in as President the next day.

== Personal life ==
As of 2009 Kaliati was married with four children.
