= Emma Kaliya =

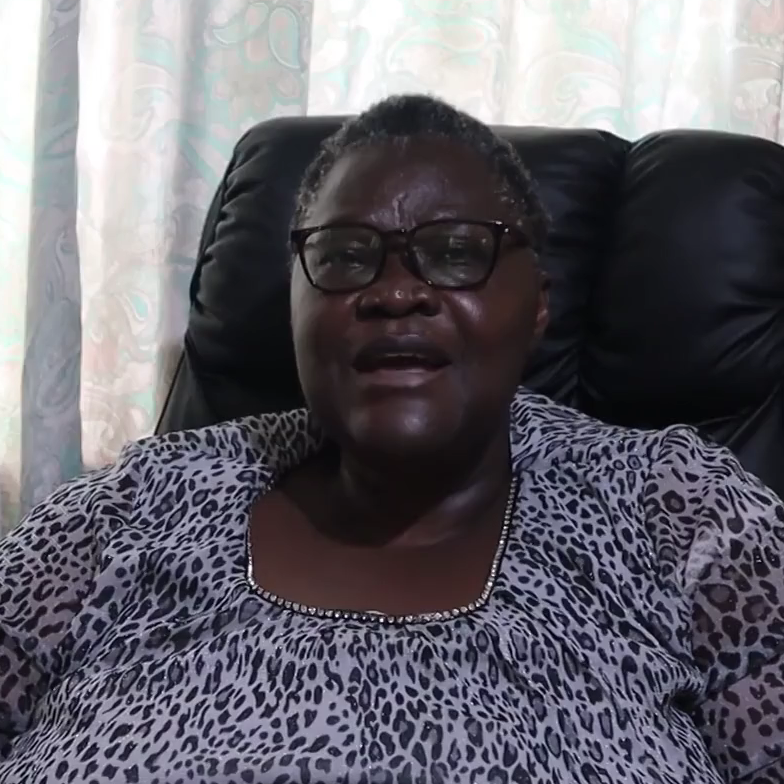
- from a 2025 Voice of America video
- Occupation: human rights activist

Emma Kaliya is a Malawian human and gender rights activist. She leads the Pan African Women's Development and Communications network which is known as FEMNET.

== Life ==
Kaliya was inspired by her father to take an interest in human rights. She has a master's degree.

She campaigned against gender-based violence for many years before the Prevention of Domestic Violence Act was passed by three votes in 2006. There was a drive before the 2014 election to target a 50:50 split of men and women in the National Assembly. Kaliya was the national coordinator for the Gender Coordinating Network NGO and she supported this work. 2,000 women were given lessons in public speaking and 250 women stood as candidates but the result was less than expected. Kaliya believed that the result reflected the country's systemic gender bias.

In 2013 she spoke out on behalf of FEMNET regarding a case of gang rape in Kenya. The victim, "Liz", was rendered unable to walk, while her attackers were sentenced to cut some grass and then released. Kaliya noted that the case was attracting international attention. The authorities were said to be rearresting the men involved. Women from 21 countries joined a protest march and a million signed a petition demanding that not only the attackers but also the police who mishandled the case should be imprisoned.

She went on to campaign to have the minimum age for marriage to be raised to eighteen, which was achieved with the 2015 Marriage, Divorce and Family Relations Act.

In 2017, she was re-elected unopposed as the President of the Pan African Women's Development and Communications network, which is known as FEMNET.

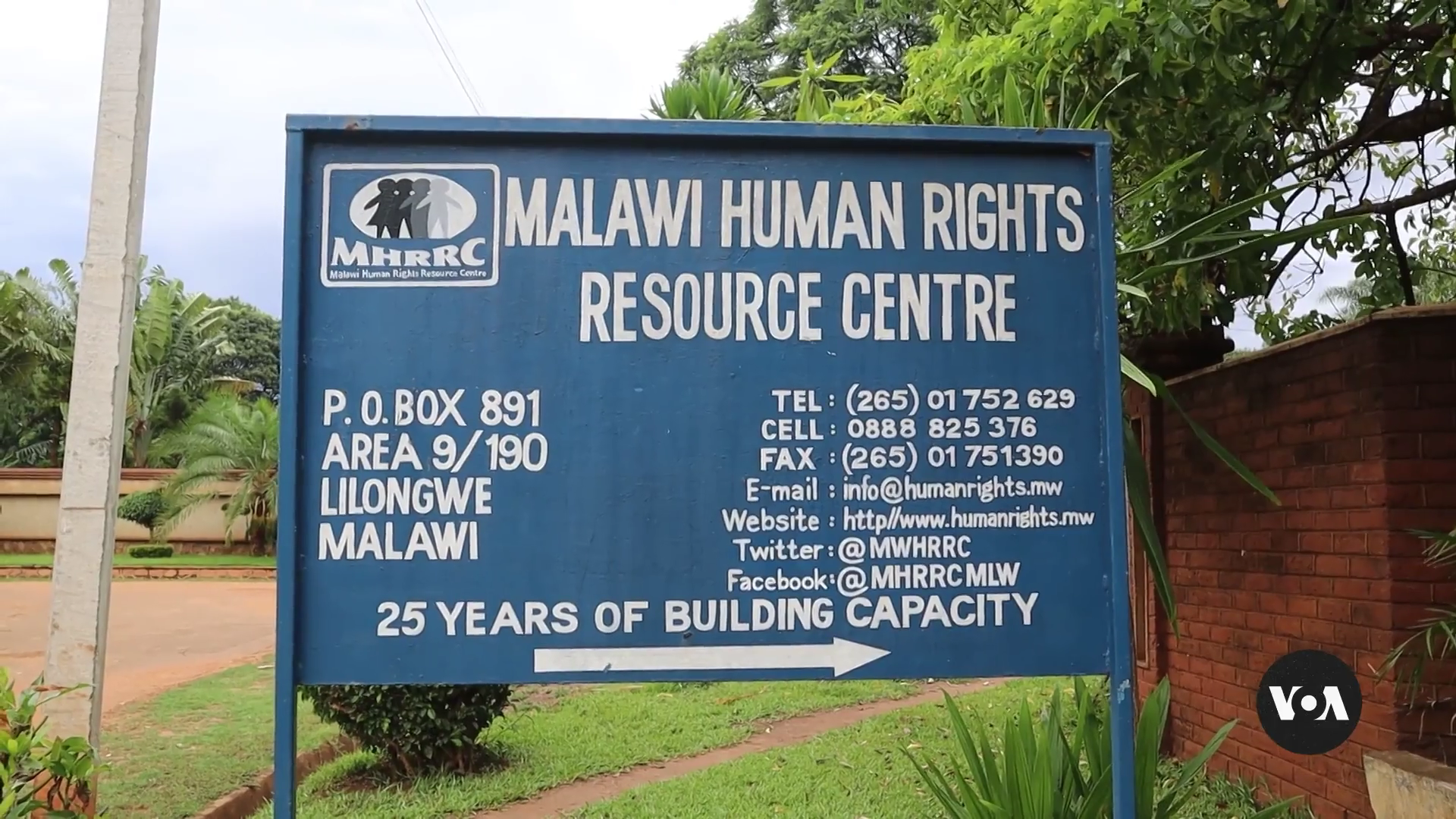
The Malawi Human Rights Centre is in Lilongwe

In 2020, Patricia Kaliati was Malawi's Minister for Gender. She took to her knees and publicly thanked her country's women's rights activists. She singled out Emmie Chanika, Reen Kachere, Faustace Chirwa, Margaret Ali, Mercy Timba, Jean Nkwanda, and Kaliya.

On 9 December 2023, Kaliya was given a lifetime Human Rights Achiever Award. She was not expecting it, but valued it particularly because Justice Redson Kapindu had led the judges. He was one of five judges who had overturned a Malawian election while wearing a bulletproof vest. The award was given jointly by four NGOs, including the Malawi Human Rights Commission.

In January 2025 she was featured by the Voice of America as the leader of the Malawi Human Rights Resource Centre in Lilongwe in a video about the work of orphanage founder Tusayiwe Mkhondya.
