= Mary Maulidi Khembo =

Malawian politician

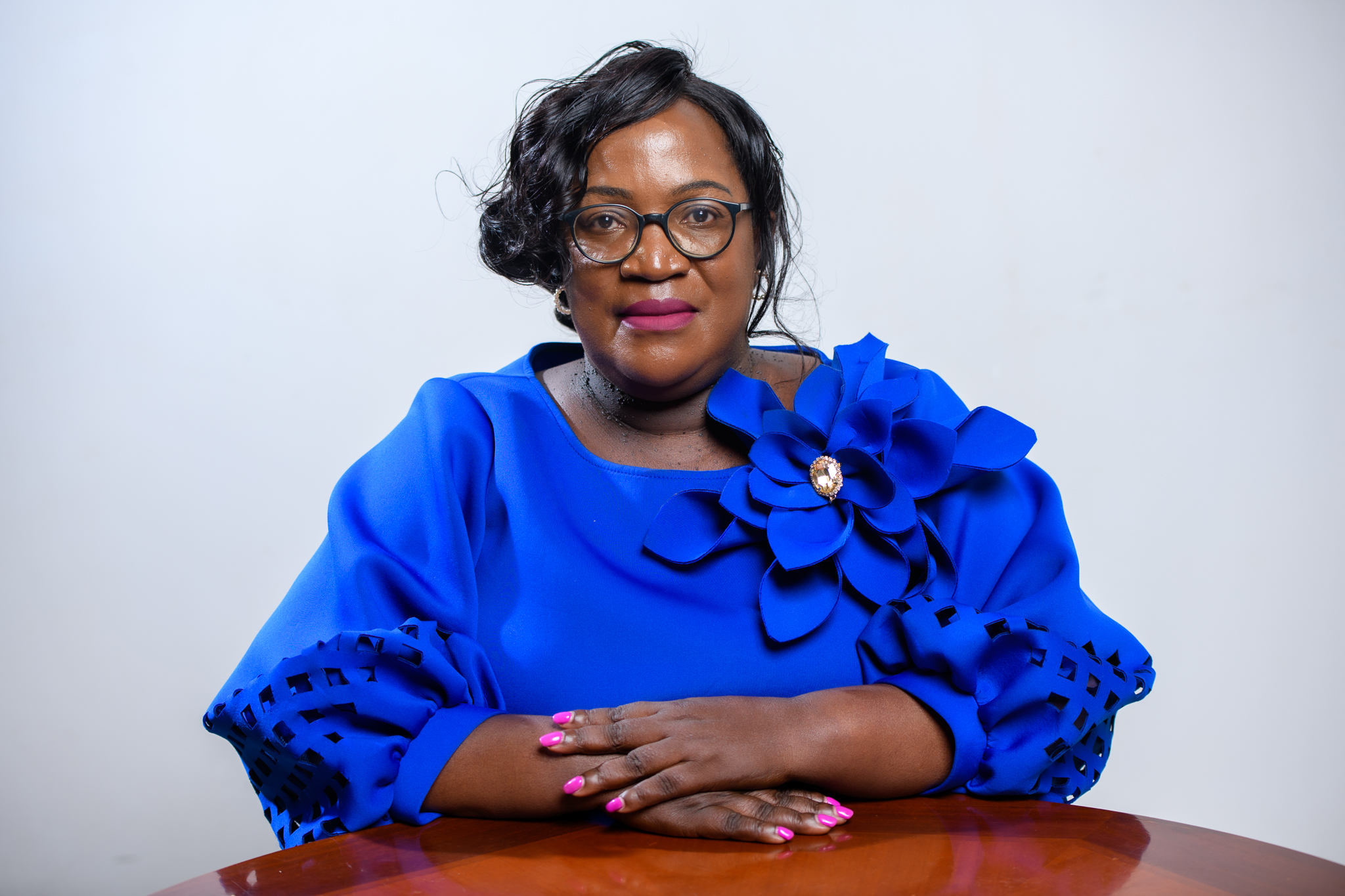
- Honourable Mary Maulidi Khembo MP

Member of Parliament
- Incumbent
- Assumed office 16th September 2026
- Parliamentary group: Malawi Parliamentary Women's Caucus
- Constituency: Neno East

Personal details
- Party: Democratic Progressive Party

Mary Maulidi Khembo is a Malawian politician. She was elected to parliament in the 2025 election where she was chosen to lead the Malawi Parliamentary Women's Caucus.

== Life ==
Khembo was elected in 2014 to the, now superseded, constituency of Neno South Constituency as a member of the Democratic Progressive Party where she served until 2019.

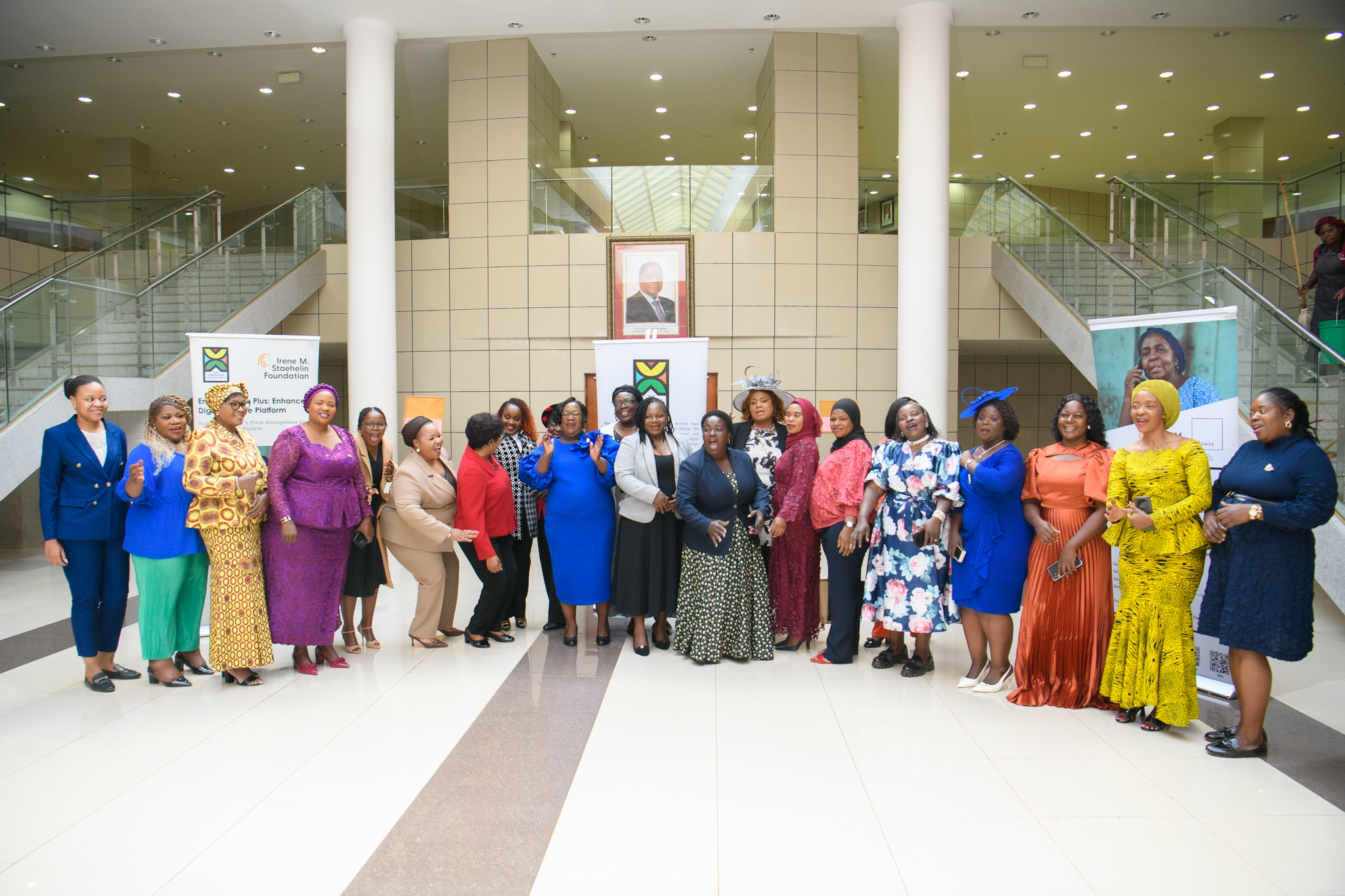
The Women's Caucus of women MPs in 2026

She was elected to parliament in the September 2025 election for the Neno East constituency. This was part of the 'Nthawi Yawo' project which aimed to break down barriers and increase women's participation in politics in Malawi, funded by the United Nations Development Programme. Two other candidates, Patrick Kankwatira and Ismael Pius, made an appeal to the Malawi Electoral Commission claiming irregularities but the case was dismissed.

After taking up her seat in parliament, Khembo was elected to be the new chair of the Malawi Parliamentary Women's Caucus in November. She will serve for two years. In February 2026, an orientation workshop was convened, bringing together the caucus, UN Women and UNDP to lay out the strategic goals of the group. Among the attendees were Abiodun Olujimi, on behalf of the African Women's Leadership network, and Fenella Frost, UNDP Resident Representative, and Fatma Mahomed, Deputy Country Representative of UN Women Malawi.

In July 2026, Khembo presented a report, produced by the Parliamentary Women's Caucus, on gender-based violence in the country to parliament. It called for action across government, local authorities, religious groups, and civil society organisations, amongst others, to tackle the problem.
