= Women in Malawi =

Women in Malawi have participated in the transformation of the country. According to the Oxford Research Encyclopedia of African History, in the pre-colonial period, communities were organized based on principles of matrilineality, which gave women rights to land, property, children, and influence in decision-making.

In more recent times, Malawi gained a reputation for resistance to change when it comes to gender equality and women's empowerment. This was apparent during the one-party era (1966-1994) when Dr. Hastings Kamuzu Banda, the president of Malawi, maintained a paternalistic approach that marginalized access to power and sidelined women's issues. Women have nonetheless been resilient enough to stand up and speak up for themselves, their families, and their communities.

== History ==
=== Precolonial and colonial periods ===
The most significant pre-colonial political formation in Malawi was the Maravi Confederacy, which emerged between the 15th and 16th centuries as a network of related Bantu-speaking people. These were the Chewa, Nyanja, and Tumbuka who acknowledged the supreme authority of a paramount chief known as the Kalonga. The Kalonga ruled from Mankhamba, an area strategically positioned near the southern end of Lake Malawi which served as the heart of a confederacy whose influence extended from the eastern coast of Mozambique to present-day Zambia, and from southern Tanzania to the Zambezi River valley. During this era, women had political power within the community, and Chewa women were thought to have "total control of the rain shrines as mediums."

Among the Mang’anja of southern Malawi, women made decisions about what to grow and helped choose community leaders. For this, they were referred to as "King Makers." Land was distributed for women to use whether they were married, widowed, or never-married.

Women’s access to land for cultivation was not immediately impacted by colonial encroachment. Europeans allowed locals to access and use land on the condition that that they perform thangata: traditional cooperative labor that was adopted and transformed by European estate holders to extract labor from African tenants, in exchange for tenancy and rights to cultivate.

The region saw a significant increase in the slave trade from 1790 to 1860, which destabilized indigenous governments and opened the door to colonial influence. Women were commodified and subject to brutal, dehumanizing treatment.

Under British colonial rule, beginning in 1891, women struggled to maintain their rights, and engaged in public protest, as well as "subversive expression in song, stories, and possession cults." However, British colonial powers advocated for patriarchal structures in the region, and actively discouraged women in leadership roles. Dorothy Tembo writes: "Missionaries abolished the political influence of women and encouraged them to live a life of submission to men."

=== Post-colonial period ===
"In post-colonial Malawi, women did not gain the freedom that they had struggled for during the anti-colonial movements." Women’s roles in politics, for example, were narrowly restricted and primarily confined to supporting men. Kamuzu Banda, the first president of the independent Malawi, selected and controlled traditions to protect his own interest. He intended to empower women through a pseudo-traditional agenda: converting the traditional role of counselor-usually an uncle (Nkhoswe) in Chewa culture from the individual to the state level, rather than extending rights and gender equality through legislation. For example, it was illegal for women to wear trousers until 1994.

Numerous Malawi women, however, engaged in public demonstration and advocacy.The Women’s League performed songs and praise poems called “Kamuzu songs” that helped to create support for Banda's leadership and the Malawi Congress Party.

Rose Chibambo began organising women in 1952 to protest colonial rule and after independence, she was the only woman member of parliament, serving as parliamentary secretary to Banda. She is widely described as Malawi's first female cabinet minister. After her critique of Banda's increasing authoritarian tendencies, she was ousted from the cabinet and spent 30 years in exile in Zambia. As of 2016, her portrait appeared on the K200 bank note.

Vera Chirwa, Malawi's first woman lawyer and a human rights activist, and her husband Orton Chirwa, fought for multiparty democracy in Malawi. As a result, they were arrested on 24 December 1981 and sentenced to death by Banda's government. Chirwa spent 12 years in prison on death row before her ultimate release in January 1993. After her release she founded two rights organisations, Malawi CARER and Women's Voice.

=== 21st-century development and the multiparty era ===
Although the multi-party era that began in 1994 promised and did bring change for women, there were also continuities with the Banda era. His successor, Bakili Muluzi (president 1994–2004), continued a paternalistic approach to women, including favoring the practice of women dancing at political functions. Muluzi also often guaranteed loans for women and provided other favors in exchange for their loyalty. When Bingu wa Mutharika came to power in 2004, he also tried to appear as a champion for women. Mutharika appropriated the moniker “Ngwazi II” and continued the practice of women dancing at political functions.

Women’s rights activists such as Seodi White, Jessie Kabwila, Sarai Chisala-Templehoff, and paramount chief Theresa Kachindamoto have improved the status of women. Kachindamoto championed gender equity in customary law by annulling over 2,500 child marriages under her jurisdiction.

== Health and education ==
=== Education ===
The same percentage — 24.4% — of both girls and boys complete lower secondary school in Malawi as of 2024. According to the World Bank, the female rate in Malawi is lower than the average across Sub-Saharan Africa and other countries in the low-income group.

The gap in adult literacy between Malawi men and women, 15.9%, is larger than the gap within the Sub-Saharan Africa aggregate.

=== Health and wellbeing ===
According to UNICEF, only 51% of women get the recommended four or more pre-natal visits during pregnancy. Twenty-nine percent of adolescents age 15-19 have begun bearing children, with higher rates among rural adolescents (31%) and lower among urban adolescents (21%).

Malawi’s maternal mortality ratio is considered one of the worst in the world at 439 deaths per 100,000 women and the majority of maternal and neonatal deaths occur during the first 48 hours after delivery.

=== Women in science and scholarship ===
Elizabeth Gomani-Chindebvu, who described the Cretaceous crocdilyform Malawisuchus in 1997 was among the first Malawian women to earn a doctorate in paleontology. Mercy Kazima, a professor of mathematics education at the University of Malawi has worked with the University of Stavanger on a Norwegian-funded project to improve mathematics teacher education in Malawi.

Malawian women have led the Circle of Concerned African Women Theologians (the Circle). The theologian Isabel Apawo Phiri became its general coordinator at its 2002 meeting in Addis Ababa, and was succeeded by another Malawian, Fulata Moyo. Rachel NyaGondwe Fiedler received her doctorate from the University of the Free State in 2017 with a history of the Circle from 1989 to 2007, published by Mzuni Press.

Timwa Lipenga, a lecturer in French at Chancellor College (University of Malawi), co-founded Makewana's Daughters, a digital forum for Malawian women writers.

=== Women in environment and agriculture ===
Gloria Majiga-Kamoto received the 2021 Goldman Environmental Prize for Africa for her campaign to enforce Malawi's ban on single-use plastics.

Anita Chitaya, a smallholder farmer and community organiser in Mzimba District, is the subject of Raj Patel's award winning documentary, The Ants and the Grasshopper (2021), which follows her journey to the United States to raise awareness of climate change's effects on Malawian Farmers. Chitaya is a community promoter with Soils, Food and Healthy Communities (SFHC) a farmer-led agroecology organisation based in Ekwendeni. SFHC began in 2000 as a pilot project with 30 farmers, led by Esther Lupafya, and Canadian researcher Rachel Bezner Kerr. After interviews with participating families revealed domestic violence and unequal division of farm labour, the project added gender-equity work to its farming trials.

Dr Tonthoza Uganja founded Sustainable Farming Solutions in 2019, a land restoration enterprise that trains rural women farmers in agroforestry, and received the Schlumberger Foundation Impact Prize in 2026 in recognition of her work.

== Cultural and traditional practices ==
=== Initiation ceremony and puberty ===
Girls’ initiation rituals are far more commonly practiced in the Southern region in Malawi, and are more common in rural than in urban areas. Boys’ initiation rituals are also more common in the South, but similarly prevalent in rural and urban areas. The most commonly reported positive aspects of initiation rituals are teaching about good behavior and social norms. Information on hygiene, health, and reproduction are also frequently reported as positive aspects. The most common activities at initiation rituals revolve around counselling, education, as well as teaching good manners and household skills. UNICEF reports that sexual components include "labia stretching and circumcision, sexual instruction and sexual practices" and are especially prevalent in the South.

In the South, in more than 60% of villages the majority of respondents states that at least some girls participate in sexual initiation rituals.

=== Early and child marriages ===
Malawi passed a law banning child marriage in 2015. However, child marriage remains prevalent according to a 2019 UNICEF survey: About 1 in 10 women married before the age of 15, while 42% were married before the age of 18, compared to their male counterparts at 1% and 6% respectively. Marriage below 15 is particularly widespread in the Southern region while marriage below 18 is highest in the Northern region. Child marriage is both an urban and rural phenomenon, but child marriage among females is more widespread in rural areas than in urban areas. At a national level, 6% of Malawians reported that all, many, or few girls in their villages take part in the Fisi practice. This is a practice in which girls are visited by a hired adult male who performs sexual intercourse with them to conclude the sexual initiation.

The activist Memory Banda campaigned for the child marriage van with the Girls Empowerment Network, whose writing workshops collected girls' testimonies published as I Will Marry When I Want To! Banda has said the law remains a major challenge because of deeply held traditional beliefs.

=== Other harmful practices ===
Wife inheritance, a tradition in which a deceased man’s brother or close relation marries his widow family has continued into the 21st century in Malawi.

Another practice in Malawi is "widow cleansing", a traditional practice in which a widow is expected to have sexual relations "in order to cleanse her".

== Women in political leadership ==
Women’s political participation presents an opportunity to represent the views of a larger group at the Ward and Constituency level, as they tend to interact more frequently with the wider community, in comparison to their male counterparts.

Apart from being the Kings Makers, women in the Republic of Malawi have served traditional roles as rainmakers, who led prayers to bring rains when droughts or famine hit, but that is not all, politically, for the past 17 years women in Malawi have risen to become, chairpersons of the electoral commission, Justice Anastasia Msosa, Justice Dr. Jane Ansah, and the current(2026) electoral commissioner, Justice Annabel Mtalimanja. Malawi has had one woman president, Joyce Banda (2012-2014), who had earlier served as Vice-President. Jane Ansah, a former Supreme Court Judge and chairperson of the Malawi Electoral Commission, became the second woman to hold the vice-presidency when she was sworn in on 4 October 2025 as a running mate to Peter Mutharika. The country has also had female leaders in parliament like the deputy speaker of national assembly-Esther Mcheka Chilenje and then Catherine Gotani Hara who became Parliament's Speaker.

=== Women representation ===
Malawi has had an increase in the number of women leaders. In the Malawi Police Services there have been two female Inspector Generals, Mary Nangwale and Merlyn Yolamu, and in sports, the national netball team, "The Queens", led by players such as Connie Mhone, Mary Waya, and Mwayi Kumwenda, have helped raise the profile of Malawi. Female footballers like Tabitha and Temwa Chawinga who play in the United States of America and France are well known Malawian women.

In August 2018, Rosemary Kanyuka was appointed to be Malawi's Law Commissioner and she received a salary, a fuel and air travel allowance and medical aid for both her and her family. The President was trying to appoint more women and the press spoke of her appointment as part of a "feminocracy" because he had appointed Annabel Mtalimanja to lead the Malawi Electoral Commission, Fiona Kalemba was the Clerk of Parliament, Gertrude Hiwa was Solicitor General and Wandika Phiri was the Prisons Chief Commissioner.

In the Malawian Defence Force, Chanju Samantha Mwale, the army's first woman lawyer was promoted from major to lieutenant colonel in 2016.

Women representation in parliament fell from 23 percent in 2019 to 21 percent in 2025. Women’s parliamentary representation rose from 5% in 1994 to 24% in 2009 but has since (2025) plateaued.

=== Women in the judiciary ===
Anastasia Msosa became the first woman judge of the High Court of Malawi and the first woman on the Supreme Court of Appeal. In June 2013, Parliament confirmed her as Malawi's first female Chief Justice, a post she held until 2015. Ivy Kamanga was one of the five judges of the Constitutional Court who in February 2020 annulled the May 2019 presidential election, the panel received the 2020 Chatham House Prize.

In October 2020 President Lazarus Chakwera appoint twelve judges to the High Court of Malawi, six of them were women: Violet Chipao, Anneline Kanthambi, Maureen Kondowe, Vikochi Chima, Agnes Patemba and Charlotte Wezi Malonda. The press reported the intake as achieving 50-50 gender representation. The appointments came two weeks after women's rights groups had protested in Blantyre against the president's failure to meet the 60-40gender balance required by the Gender Equality Act in earlier public appointments.

The Judiciary's annual report for 2021 profiled 36 judges of the High Court, 14 of them women. They included Dorothy nyaKaunda Kamanga, Rachel Sophie Sikwese and Fiona Mwale appointed in October 2012; Annabel Mtalimanja and Zione Ntaba, appointed in June 2013; Dorothy DeGabriele and Ruth Chinangwa, appointed in October 2016; and Chimwemwe Kamowa, appointed in March 2020. Sikwese was appointed a half-time judge of the United Nations Dispute Tribunal in July 2019, and Mwale chaired the National Child Justice Forum.

Tujilane Chizumila, a former judge of the High Court of Malawi, was appointed Malawi's first woman Ombudsman and served from 2010 to 2015. In January 2017, she was elected a judge of the African Court on Human and People's Rights, and she was re-elected for a second and final six-year in February 2023.

=== Barriers to political participation ===
The cost of participation in politics for women in Malawi remains high. Despite on-going calls for increased female representation at all levels of government, the country continues to grapple with the low involvement of women in politics. During a pre-election period, for at least two years or longer, candidates go around communities positioning themselves for party primary elections distributing money to party cadres who form the primary elections’ electoral college. Village chiefs, church leaders and even ordinary citizens expect to receive money or gifts from the candidates. How much you give sometimes determines how are received in the communities and may determine the outcome of the elections. Traditionally Malawian society expects women to be submissive and docile. When women challenge these norms by speaking out or taking a stand, they are often met with critical labels and subjected to name-calling. A HIVOS report on participation of women leaders in Malawi said, "Women face various challenges to active participation in politics including deeply entrenched patriarchal systems, gender norms, political violence, corruption, intimidation, hatred and character assassination."

Research also suggests that social media has also made it very easy for the spread of fake news. Often times, the authors of such articles do not use their real identities, hence it becomes difficult to follow up on the situation. The study observed that cyberbullying mainly influenced by patriarchy.

=== Advocacy and campaigns ===
Civil society seems the most viable option for speeding up women’s participation in the political process and the legal sphere. A coalition of gender rights advocates calls for legislative quotas to correct the political imbalance. The Gender Coordination Network argues that change requires bold legal reforms.

The fight for gender equality in Malawi is not only led by transnational feminists Networks like Women and Law in Southern Africa (WLSA) but by local NGOs like the Women’s Legal Resource Centre (WOLREC) that have sought to address gender inequality, with specific emphasis on raising local voices against issues affecting women in Malawi.

== National Gender Policy ==
The most important sectoral policy is the National Gender Policy, whose purpose is to strengthen gender mainstreaming and women empowerment at all levels in order to facilitate attainment of gender equality and equity in Malawi.

Malawi’s initial effort at a National Gender Machinery was with the creation of the National Commission on Women in Development (NCWID) in 1987. Efforts of the NCWID resulted in law reviews and the development of a National Platform of Action for implementing the Beijing Platform of Action. In the 1990s Malawi established a Ministry for Women, Children and Community Services (MoWCCS). Malawi has embraced both the Gender and Development (GAD) model and gender mainstreaming approaches. For example, in 2004, the Ministry for Women, Children and Community Services (MoWCCS) was renamed to Ministry of Gender, Children and Community Development (MoGCCD) to embrace the GAD approach. The new Deceased Estates Act protects the spouse’s and children’s share in the estate. Moreover, the Act makes property grabbing an offense, liable for a fine of MK1 Million or imprisonment for up to three years. Currently being implemented include: the National Gender Program; National Gender Policy; National Response to Combat Gender-based Violence; and a 50/50 campaign to increase representation of women in Parliament and Local Government.

== See also ==
- Women in the Media in Malawi
- Malawi Media Women's Association
- Women Lawyers Association (Malawi)
- Women Judges Association of Malawi
- Malawi Parliamentary Women's Caucus
- National Association of Business Women (NABW)
- Malawi Women in Mining Association (MAWIMA)
- NGO Gender Coordination Network (NGO GCN)
