= Fiona Mwale =

Malawian judge (born 1974)

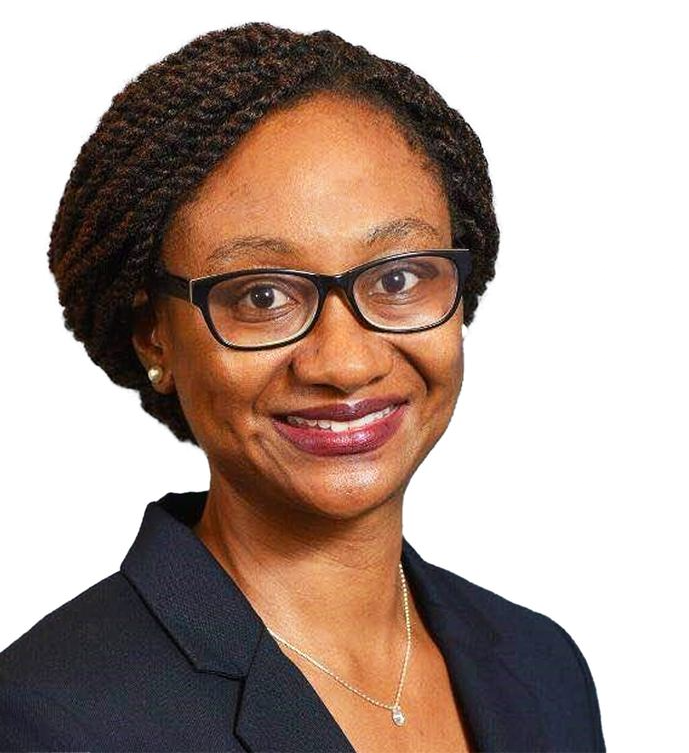
- Mwale in 2025
- Born: 30 October 1974 (age 52)
- Education: University of Leeds, University of Warwick
- Occupation: High Court judge
- Employer: Malawi Human Rights Commission et al
- Title: Justice

Fiona Atupele Mwale (born 30 October 1974) is a Malawian High Court Judge. She approved Madonna's 2017 adoption of Malawian twin girls. She later used the constitution to remove a law that discriminated against a woman's evidence in sexual crimes.

== Life ==
Mwale was born in 1974. She studied law in the UK. She graduated from the University of Leeds before she studied at the University of Warwick for a Master of Laws. She was accepted at the English bar at Gray's Inn.

Mwale was the Malawi Human Rights Commission's Principal Legal Officer before she was appointed as a High Court judge in 2012. Mwale held senior positions in the Women Judges Association of Malawi, serving as its national training coordinator in 2016.

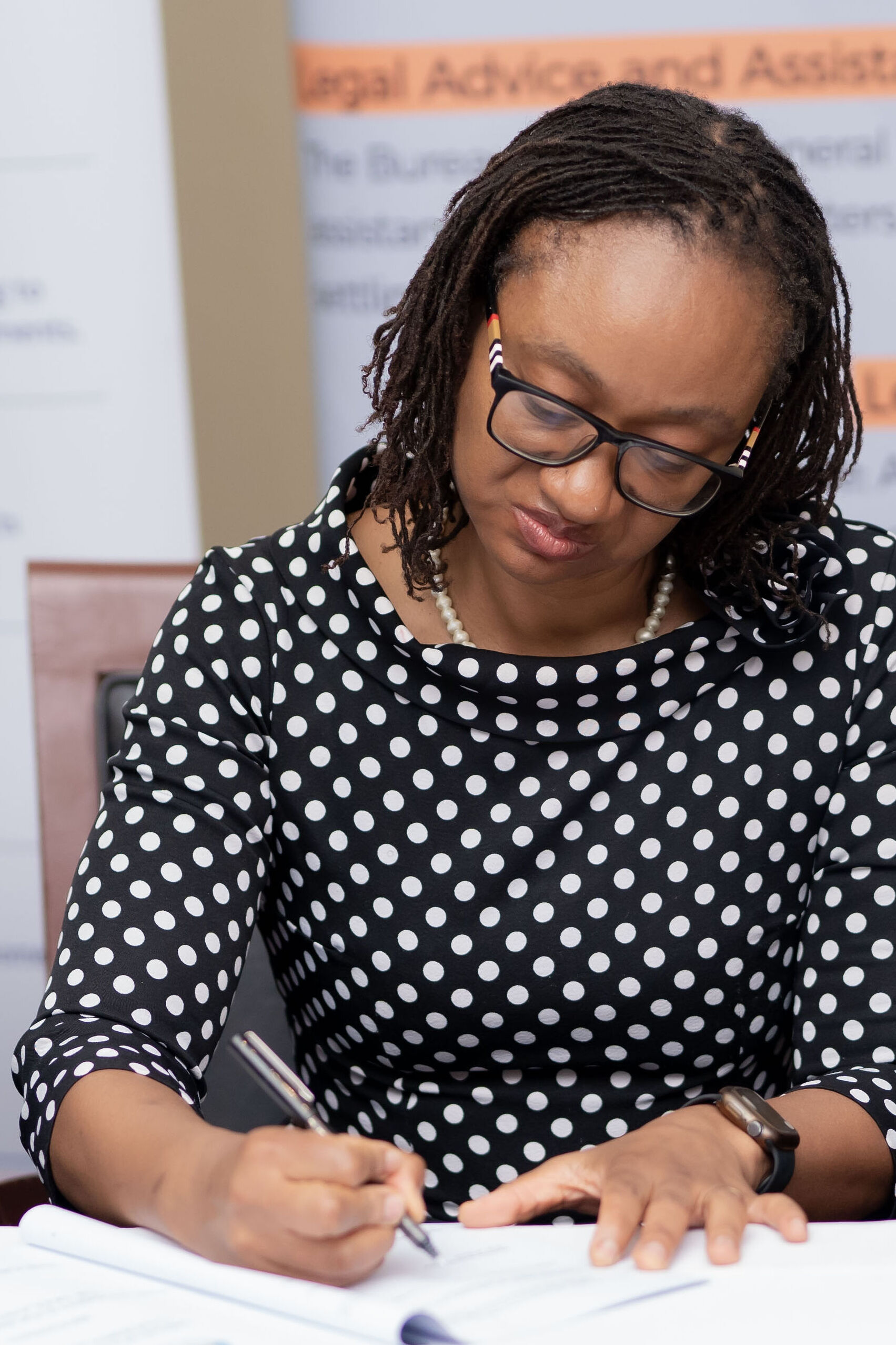
Justice Mwale signing an MOU with the Gender and Justice Unit in 2026

In 2019 she was one of nine women who were judges in Malawi, the others were Justice of Appeal Jane Ansah who led the Malawi Electoral Commission, Dorothy Kamanga, Ivy Kamanga, Rachel Sophie Sikwese, Annabel Mtalimanja, Zione Ntaba and Ruth Chinangwa. Justice Esme Chombo, had been involved in Madonna's adoptions, but in 2019 she was said to be just retired.

In 2020 Justice Mwale was able to overturn the precedent that women are unreliable witnesses in cases of sexual crime. She was able to argue that these were discriminatory as they contradicted Section 20 of the Malawian Constitution which forbids discrimination on the grounds of sex and gender. In the specific case the court had ignored the evidence in a case of a sexual attack on a child who was eleven years old because they set aside the evidence because the child was female and there was no corroborating evidence. Her judgement attracted comment internationally. Mwale believes that a major issue in tackling abuse was the physical distance between abusers and the court system. Victims and the accused had to travel large distances and this made it difficult for witnesses to give evidence.

In 2023 she was given a lifetime achievement award by the Women's Lawyers Association of Malawi.

In 2024 Fiona Mwale was an (unsuccessful) candidate for the UN's Committee on the Rights of the Child. She stood at the same time as Boniface Massah who was a candidate for the UN's Committee on the Rights of Persons with Disabilities.

Following the 2025 election there was a number of petitions by losing candidates. Mwale rejected case number 85 in which Clement Mwale tried unsuccessfully to overturn the election of Khadija Chunga.

== Adoption ==
Mwale was tasked with approving Madonna's proposed adoption of 4 year-old twins in 2017. Their mother had died and their father had agreed to the proposed adoption. Mwale noted that she was confident that Madonna could supply a good childhood to the twins and she asked Madonna "uncomfortable questions" particularly on her motives. Mwale said she believed that Madonna was "motivated by her desire to offer a home, love, protection and guidance to the infants."

Mwale did not address the question of the twins being taken abroad as the issue had previously been addressed by the Supreme Court, however she noted that she was dealing with Malawi's most precious resource, its children. After the case was settled she spoke out advising that Malawi adopt the Hague Convention on Inter-country Adoption, a convention that addresses the issue of "foreigners fly[ing] in to adopt a child".

== Private life ==
She is married and they have children.
