= Ruth Chinangwa =

- Born: 6 April 1980 (age 46)
- Known for: High court judge

Ruth Fletcher Chinangwa (born 6 April 1980) is a Malawian high court judge.

== Life ==
Chinangwa was born in 1980.

She is married and has children. She holds a Bachelor of Laws (Hons) Chinangwa attended the University of Malawi and she studied law and graduated in 2003. Three years later she achieved a master's degree at the University of Zimbabwe in Women's Law.

She joined the Judiciary as a Senior Resident Magistrate.

Chinangwa became a High Court judge on 14 October 2016 when she and three others were appointed by President Peter Mutharika. She had been Lilongwe's Chief Resident Magistrate. The other three appointed were Joseph Chigona, Dorothy de Grabrielle and George Bakuwa and they brought the total number of the country's judges to 25.

In 2019 she was one of nine women who were judges in Malawi, the others were Justice of Appeal Jane Ansah who led the Malawi Electoral Commission, Dorothy Kamanga, Ivy Kamanga, Rachel Sophie Sikwese, Annabel Mtalimanja, Zione Ntaba and Fiona Mwale. Justice Esme Chombo, had been involved in Madonna's adoptions, but in 2019 she was said to be just retired.

In June 2024 ex-vice-president Cassim Chilumpha was again being tried for treason in a reconvened case led by Chinangwa. Chilumpha had originally been arrested in 2006 for treason and his case had been set aside in 2023. Chinangwa said that this did not prevent further legal action. She questioned the high cost of the jury trial in September 2024 noting that money would need to be set aside to pay for a jury and the cost would be significant.

== Private life ==
She is married and has children.
