= Rachel Sophie Sikwese =

Malawian judge (born 1970)

- Born: 9 February 1970 (age 56)
- Education: University of Malawi; Indiana University School of Law
- Occupation: High Court judge
- Spouse: Gracian Zibelu Banda (1997–2013)

Rachel Sophie Sikwese (born 9 February 1970) is a Malawian judge. She served on the High Court of Malawi and on a United Nations (UN) tribunal.

== Life ==
Sikwese was born in 1970. She studied law at the University of Malawi and graduated in 1997. In the following year she was serving as a magistrate. Three years later she graduated from Indiana University School of Law with a master of laws degree in 2000.

In 2004, she took the chair of Malawi's Industrial Relations Court. She has written about labour law and industrial relations.

In 2012, she became a High Court judge when she was sworn in by President Joyce Banda. She was one of several judges sworn in and President Banda assured them that she did not intend to use her presidential power to interfere with the judiciary. She was a joint author and editor of "Labour Law in Malawi" in 2012.

In 2019, she was one of nine women who were judges in Malawi, the others were Justice of Appeal Jane Ansah who led the Malawi Electoral Commission, Dorothy Kamanga, Ivy Kamanga, Fiona Mwale, Annabel Mtalimanja, Zione Ntaba and Ruth Chinangwa. Justice Esme Chombo, had been involved in Madonna's adoptions, but in 2019 she was said to be just retired.

The United Nations Dispute Tribunal recognised Sikwese as an international judge in 2019. She was sworn in by the United Nations Secretary-General Antonio Guterres and she would serve there for seven years as one of the six half-time judges. She began the appointment at the same time as Justice Eleanor Donaldson-Honeywell of Trinidad and Tobago, Justice Francis Belle of Barbados and Justice Margaret Tibulya of Uganda.

One of her monographs was published by the International Encyclopedia for Labour Law and Industrial Relations. In 2024, she wrote an article for UN Today explaining the UN's internal laws and how they were applied in practice to its employees.

== Private life ==
Sikwese married in 1997 to Gracian Zibelu Banda and they had children. The marriage was dissolved in 2013 and she and her husband disputed the ownership of items. That resulted in a case between them that was judged in the Supreme Court in 2015 by several judges led by Jane Ansah.
