= Zione Ntaba =

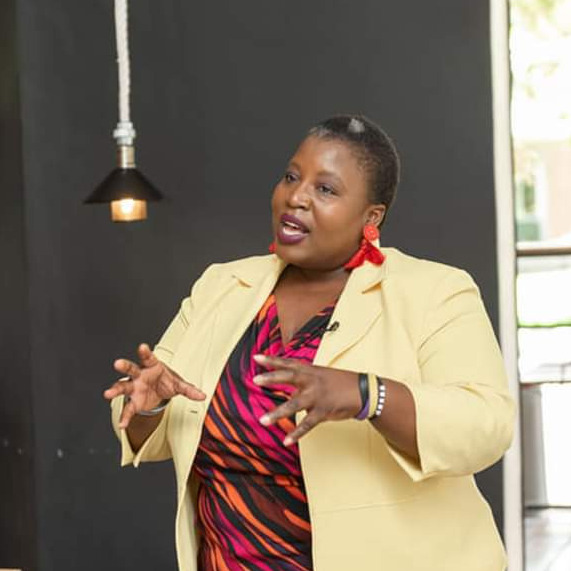
- Ntaba in 2026
- Born: 11 April 1978 (age 48)
- Education: University of Malawi, Institute of Advanced Legal Studies at the University of London
- Occupation: High Court Judge

Zione Jane Veronica Ntaba (born 11 April 1978) is a Malawian High Court judge. She leads the legal support group Justice Advocacy Africa in Malawi.

== Life ==
Ntabe was born in 1978. She studied law at the University of Malawi and in 2007 she obtained a masters degree in Advanced Legislative Drafting from the Institute of Advanced Legal Studies at the University of London,

In 2009 she was in America taking a course organised by Justice Advocacy Africa at the National Institute for Trial Advocacy.

She became a High Court Judge on 19 June 2013.

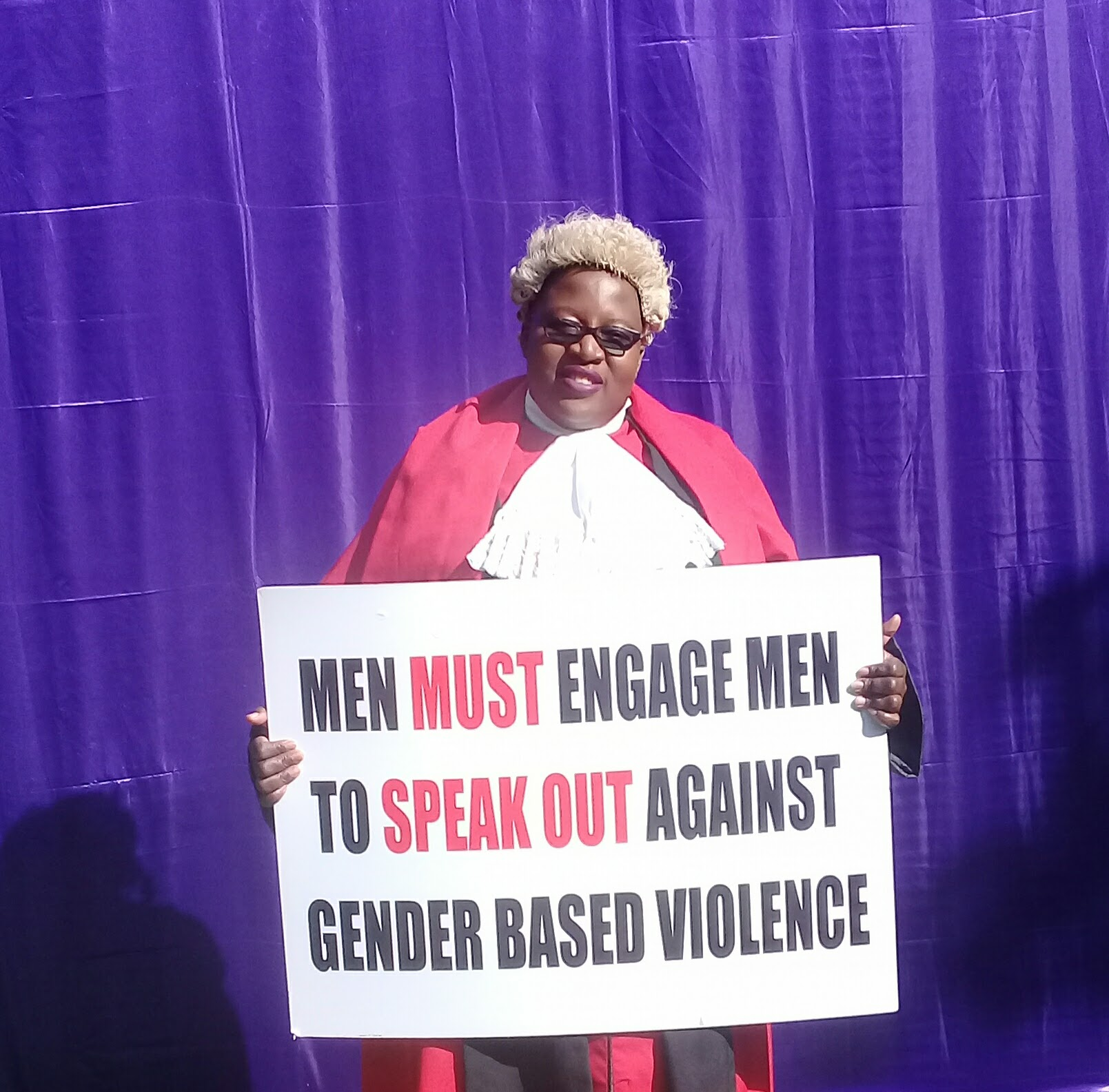
Justice Zione Ntaba

In 2019 she was one of nine women who were judges in Malawi, the others were Jane Ansah who later became Vice President of Malawi, Dorothy Kamanga, Ivy Kamanga, Rachel Sophie Sikwese, Annabel Mtalimanja, Fiona Mwale and Ruth Chinangwa. Ntaba had to recuse herself from a case she was judging in 2019 concerning the murder of an albino man, MacDonald Masambuka. Testimony given by one of the accused was that the murder was the idea of Peter Mutharika and Hetherwick Ntaba. Mutharika was a previous President of Malawi at the time and Hetherwick Ntaba was her father's brother. (The case was later judged by Dorothy Kamanga).

Ntaba is involved with Justice Advocacy Africa since it began in 2009 and its pro bono work to further justice in Malawi, Uganda, Kenya, and Botswana. She is the Program Director for Malawi and she is a member of their board. Ntaba was programmes coordinator of the Women Judges Association of Malawi in 2017, when she led the association's commemoration of the Sixteen Days of Activism against Gender-Based Violence at Dzaleka refugee camp.

In 2022 the Lands Minister Kezzie Msukwa was arrested by the Anti-Corruption Bureau while he was receiving treatment at a hospital. He applied for a judicial review and Ntaba set aside the arrest, but she did not grant the review. Her decision created some debate and the Malawi Law Society issued a statement which was interpreted at a rebuke of her action. They argued that if there was no review then an arrest could not be set aside.

In 2024 she cautioned the country's executive for failing to legalise customary marriages. She ruled that they should legalise customary marriages that had taken place since 2015. She said this should be done within three months. The case arose because of a couple who divorced and the woman found out that she had few rights because she was not legally married. She and her partner had a traditional marriage and they and the community thought they were married. A 2015 marriage law made conditions that included the need to publish an intention to marry before the wedding. The act required that traditional leaders should be made into registrars but this had not happened. Ntaba made a more generous settlement for the woman.

In a 2025 speech, she said that there is relatively little enforcement of anti-human trafficking law in the country.
