= Fiona Kalemba =

Malawian Clerk of Parliament

- Occupation: civil servant
- Employer: Malawian parliament
- Known for: Clerk of Parliament

Fiona Kalemba is a Malawian civil servant. She became the Director General / Clerk of Parliament in 2016, the most senior civil servant position in the Malawian parliament.

== Career ==
Kalemba was chosen as the Clerk of Parliament following interviews of prospective candidates. A small group of MPs argued that she had not been the winning applicant but that she had been chosen by President Peter Mutharika because she was a woman. The case went to the high court in 2015. The judge agreed that she may have been chosen because she was a woman, but that was the President's right and positive discrimination was not illegal in Malawi.

Kalemba was sworn-in in January 2016. She became the most senior civil servant in parliament. By 2018 the press was citing her appointment as evidence of "a feminocracy". The President had appointed Annabel Mtalimanja to lead the Malawi Electoral Commission, Gertrude Hiwa was Solicitor General, Wandika Phiri was the Prisons Chief Commissioner and Rosemary Kanyuka became the Law Commissioner.

In March 2020 Kalemba accompanied the Speaker of the House, Catherine Gotani Hara, on a trip to Scotland where she was hosted by the Scotland Malawi Partnership. They were accompanied by civil servants and while there they met other visiting Malawian MPs.

In 2021 a former deputy speaker, Clement Chiwaya, visited her office in his wheelchair. He was annoyed that parliament was not covering accidental damage to his car after he left parliament. He had smuggled in a gun and he died when he shot himself.

Following Malawi's 2025 General Election the house needed to appoint a new speaker. Five members put their names forward, but Kalemba barred the last as the constitution required four candidates. Sameer Suleman won with a majority over Peter Dimba. The third and fourth candidates had no votes even though they were allowed to vote for themselves.

Kalemba welcomed the new MPs, and the new speaker Sameer Suleman, to a parliamentary introduction course. The new MPs course was funded by the United Nations Development Programme (UNDP) and it focused on the role of parliamentary committees. Kalemba emphasised the committee's importance as the "engine room of parliament".
