= Maxon Mbendera =

Malawian lawyer (1958–2016)

Justice Maxon Mbendera SC (4 November 1958 – 18 August 2016) was a judge of the Malawi Supreme Court of Appeal and the chairman of the Malawi Electoral Commission.

Mbendera held an LLB (Hons) from the University of Malawi and an LLM in International Trade and Investment Law. In 1981, he was admitted to the Malawi Bar and worked for Savjani & Co. for 13 years. He then set up his own law firm, which he led for 15 years until he was appointed Judge of the High Court in 2009. During his time at the bar, Mbendera served as secretary of the Malawi Law Society from 1993 to 1995, and later its president from 1999 to 2001.

Mbendera served as Malawi's Attorney General from 2011 to 2012. He was appointed as a judge of the Supreme Court of Malawi at the end of 2012. That same year, he was appointed chairman of the Malawi Electoral Commission. His term as chairperson was expected to end in October 2016. At his death in August 2016, Mbendera was survived by his wife and four children.
