= Kanyuka =

Kanyuka is a surname. Notable people with the surname include:

- Patrick Kanyuka (born 1987), Congolese football defender
- Rosemary Kanyuka, Malawian lawyer and diplomat
