= Supreme Court of Appeal =

Supreme Court of Appeal may refer to:

- The Supreme Court of Appeal (Malawi) Supreme Court of Appeal in Malawi
- The Supreme Court of Appeal, an appellate court in South Africa
- The Newfoundland Supreme Court of Appeal
- The West Virginia Supreme Court of Appeals

It may also refer to other Courts of Appeal.
