= Rosemary Kanyuka =

Malawian lawyer and diplomat

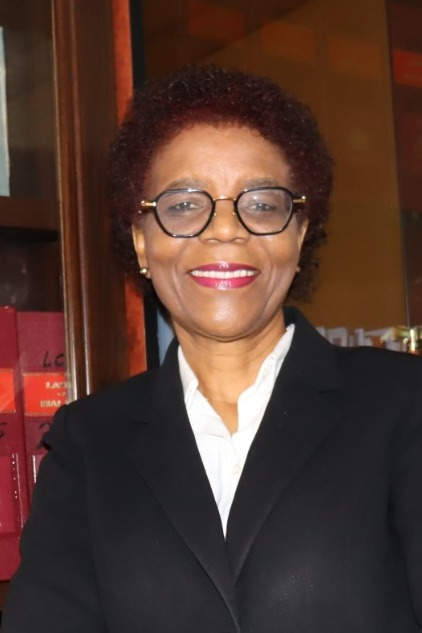
- Kanyuka in 2026
- Preceded by: Gertrude Hiwa

Personal details
- Education: University of Malawi
- Occupation: Lawyer and diplomat
- Known for: Director of Public Prosecutions

Rosemary Kumitsonyo Kanyuka is a Malawian lawyer and diplomat who has served as Malawi's director of public prosecutions and deputy ambassador to Japan. In 2018 she was appointed to lead the Malawi Law Commission.

== Life ==
Kanyuka graduated in law from Chancellor College, University of Malawi.

The British Council paid for her to attend a meeting in Trinity College, Cambridge in 1995 where she discussed the current state of the country's provisional constitution. She was then employed in a legal practise in Lilongwe and she noted that the constitution laid down terms that favoured an equality between the sexes but the requirements were not being enforced. Women were enduring inadequate laws because the constitution allowed for a Law Commissioner to enforce the constitution, but there was no appointed Law Commissioner.

She became the Director of Private Prosecutions and she permitted a case by the Anti-Corruption Bureau against Minister of Gender Patricia Kaliati for corruption. The case was later abandoned.

Between 2012 and 2017 she was her country's deputy ambassador (Deputy Head of Mission) to Japan.

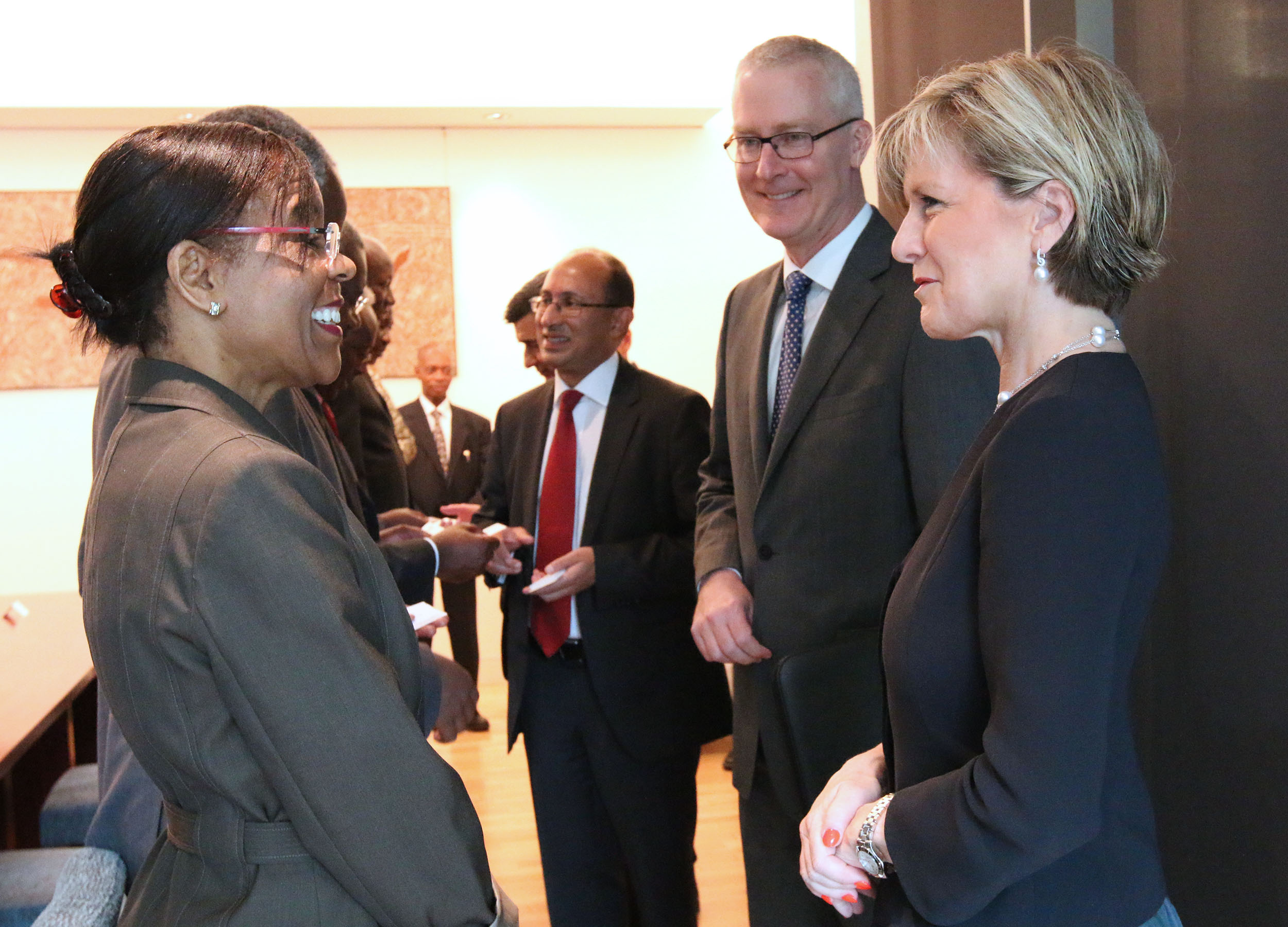
Rosemary Kanyuka and Julie Bishop in Japan in 2014

In August 2018, she became a director of the Reserve Bank of Malawi and in the November she was appointed to be Malawi's Law Commissioner by the President for a term of as many as five years. She received a salary, a fuel and air travel allowance and medical aid for both her and her family. The President was trying to appoint more women and the press spoke of her appointment as part of a feminocracy as he had appointed Annabel Mtalimanja to lead the Malawi Electoral Commission, Fiona Kalemba as the Clerk of Parliament, Gertrude Hiwa as Solicitor General and Wandika Phiri as the Prisons Chief Commissioner.

Malawi's former minister Uladi Mussa was facing bribery charges in 2019 relating to the granting of Malawi citizenship to Burundians after less than a year of Malawi residence. Kanyuka proposed to enforce the existing seven year residency rule required for citizenship and to create a designated committee to review applications.

Kanyuka (last but two) among the retiring HR Commissioners in 2026

Kanyuka was one of Malawi's Human Rights Commissioners as part of her position as law commissioner.

She was elected to be the vice-President of the Commonwealth Association of Law Reform Agencies in Malta in April 2025.

In May 2026, Kanyuka still served as Malawi's Law Commissioner. In line with Section 4 of the Human Rights Commission Act and the constitution, she and the Ombudsman Grace Malera, called for nominations to serve as one of the new human rights commissioners.

== Private life ==
Kanyuka is an elder in a church in Lilongwe.
