= Supreme Court of Appeal (Malawi) =

Court of the Malawi government

Supreme Court of Appeal in Malawi had, prior to the 1995 Constitution of Malawi, been presided over by Judges who also sat in the High Court. The 1995 constitution of the Republic of Malawi created the Malawi Supreme court of Appeal with its own Justices of Appeal.

== Composition and organisation ==
According to Section 105 of the Constitution of Malawi, the Supreme Court consists of the Chief Justice and such other number of judges not being less than three.

The Chief Justice is appointed by the President of the Republic of Malawi and confirmed by the Malawi National Assembly by a majority of two thirds of members present and voting. The other Judges of the Supreme court are appointed by the President of the Republic of Malawi from amongst serving judges of the High Court of Malawi on recommendation of the Judicial Service Commission.

The Supreme Court of Appeal has jurisdiction only in appeals from the High Court or other lower courts or tribunals. It is composed of the Chief Justice and Justices of Appeal. A sitting of the Supreme Court was presided by three Justices of Appeal which would at times include the Chief Justice except in Constitutional matters where five Justices of Appeal have to preside. From 2018, the Chief Justice issued a Practice Direction requiring the Chief Justice or such other senior Justice of Appeal to sit with at least six other Justices of Appeal on all matters. The Supreme Court judges include Ivy C. Kamanga from 2020 and Dorothy nyaKaunda Kamanga from 2022. The Lord Chief Justice from 2022 was Rizine R. Mzikamanda,

== Powers ==
The Supreme court of Appeal is the highest Appellate Court on all matters, civil or criminal, including Constitutional matters. It hears all appeals from the High court which has original jurisdiction over all matters, including constitutional matters.

== Nature and effects of judgements ==
According to Section 105 (2) of the Malawi Constitution, the judgements of the Supreme Court Of Appeal are taken in majority in writing with reasons for the decisions. Any matter, not being an interlocutory one, is determined by the Malawi Supreme Court of Appeal comprising an uneven number of justices of Appeal not being less than three in number.

And according to section 104 (2) of the Malawi Constitution, the judgements of the Supreme Court of Appeal are final on any matter,whether civil or criminal, including any constitutional matter in issue and are binding on all lower courts in Malawi.

== See also ==
- Constitution of Malawi
