= World Refugee Day =

Annual international day organised by the UN

- Official name: World Refugee Day
- Observed by: Worldwide
- Type: International, cultural
- Significance: Awareness day for refugees; Anti-discrimination day
- Date: 20 June
- Frequency: Every year
- Related to: Refugee Week

World Refugee Day is an international day organised every year on 20 June by the United Nations. It is designed to celebrate and honour refugees from around the world. The day was first established on 20 June 2001, in recognition of the 50th anniversary of the 1951 Convention Relating to the Status of Refugees.

The event aims to recognise the strength of the refugees who have fled the conflict and persecution of their country in hope of finding sanctuary and living a better life. World Refugee Day builds the concept of understanding for their plight which shows one's resilience and courage in the rebuilding of their future.

The day is seen as an opportunity for everyone to experience, understand and celebrate "the rich diversity" of the communities of refugees. Events such as theatre, dance, films, and music aim to allow refugee community organisations, voluntary and statutory organisations, local councils, and schools to host events during the week in order to honour the cause.

World Refugee Day is also celebrated through World Refugee Week and is designed to provide an important chance for asylum seekers and refugees to be seen, listened to and valued by the community that they are living in.

== Background ==
A refugee is an individual who leaves their country due to the ramifications of war, conflict persecutions and violence that they have faced within their home country. Through the process of crossing international borders, some refugees are often found to leave everything behind carrying only the minimal clothing and possessions; with the plan to find safety and haven in a different country.

The 1951 Refugee Convention acknowledges a refugee as an individual who is unable to return to their country of origin owing to the founded fear of being affected by their race, religion, participation of a social group or in different political opinions.

=== Impact on the globe ===
Refugees play a role in the globe as when they are positioned to have access to the legal employment opportunities in their host country, they are able to utilises their knowledge to assist in filling the gap of a country's labour market. These inclusions in society create a more diverse in culture and multiculturalisation which provides the community with the opportunity to learn from each other.

Majority of the refugees come from backgrounds where they have been formally employed and can assist their new country in contributing to the security of the country as well as their revenue. Through having refugees in a country, the hosts also need to prepare for an increase in the cost of services such as access to healthcare of education which is provided by the government. They are also able to create the ability to contribute to society by acting as a mediator in different intercultural exchanges, this means that the country will be able to experience a more effective socio-cultural diversity within the community.

== History ==
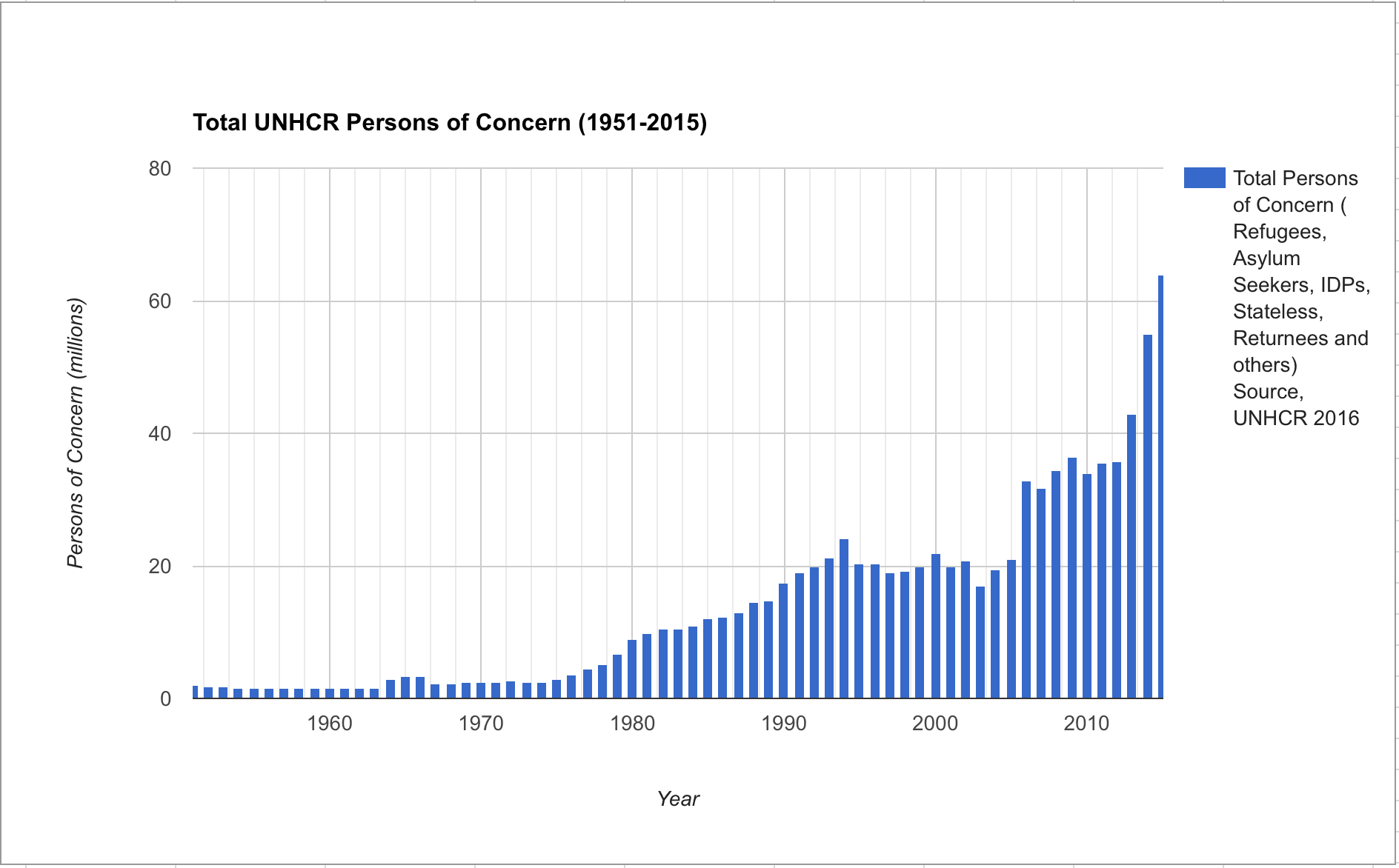
Graph showing the growth in the total number of UNCHR Persons of Concern

On 4 December 2000, the United Nations General Assembly in Resolution 55/76 acknowledged that, 2001 and onwards, 20 June would be celebrated as World Refugee Day. The resolution saw that 2001 marked the 50th anniversary of the 1951 Convention relating to the Status of Refugees. The convention had commemorated refugees to honour, raise awareness and solicit support to those affected around the globe.

African Refugee Day had been formally celebrated in several countries prior to 2000. The UN noted that the Organization of African Unity (OAU) had agreed to have International Refugee Day coincide with Africa Refugee Day on 20 June.

The United Nations High Commissioner for Refugees started the #WithRefugees petition to send a message to the people of the action, solidarity, and responsibility on behalf of refugees to governments worldwide. There have been projects and resources that have been put into place which aims to spread the word to educate people about the way of life for refugees. The United Nations works along with the community to try to end the refugee crisis and find homes for displaced people worldwide.

In 1967, the United Nations had expanded the number of people who would apply for a refugee status because of the acts of the 1951 Convention which had defined a refugee as an individual or person who had been forced to flee their homes because of World War II. This came to be known as the 1967 Protocol. The protocol at the time had removed the time limitations and geographical definitions of what it meant to be a refugee.

== The United Nation Action – The General Assembly ==
As one of the six principal cores of the United Nations, the General Assembly is responsible for the main policymaking and representative of issues around the globe. Upon the Fiftieth anniversary of the Office of the United Nations there has been a resolution which is attained by the general assembly specifically to cater for the refugees and World Refugee Day. The eight key goals are as follows:

1. Commends the Office of the United Nations High Commissioner for Refugees in regards of its lead and push for coordination within international action for refugees. it acknowledges the process of the protection and aid to refugees and other persons of concern, which aims to create a suitable outcome for their problems of refugees entering the country.
2. Pays to the humanitarian workers and the staff of the Office of the High Commissioner in the aid of the refugees this is because they are the individuals who risk their lives while they are on the job.
3. Reaffirms its support for the activities of the Office of the High Commissioner, this will be simultaneous to the results of the general assembly, on behalf of the returnees, and identity of the internally displaced persons. The cause of an internally displaced person is the causes of internal displacement, including armed conflict, generalised violence, human rights violations, and "natural and man-made disasters", either through a sudden or slow onset.
4. Notes the main role of movements with the global society, for both regional and non-governmental organisations, this includes the participation of refugees in laws that affect their lives. The Protocol obliges States to comply with the substantive provisions of the 1951 Convention to all individuals who are covered by the definition of a refugee without any limitation of date. Although related to the Convention, the Protocol is still an independent instrument, which is an accession to which is not limited to States parties to the Convention.
5. Recognises that the High Commissioner will contribute to evaluating the principles of the United Nations, this will be those in relations to peace, human rights and development. This aims to recall the right of individuals to create self-determination, by virtue of which they have the right freely to determine their own political status and to pursue their economic, social and cultural development within themselves.
6. Notes that this convention will set out the overarching concepts for international refugee protection. The developments in the international human rights law also reinforce the principle that the Convention will be applied without discrimination to anyone as to their sex, age, disability, sexuality, or other prohibited grounds of discrimination. The Convention also stipulates that, there is only the exceptions, that a refugees should not be penalized for their illegal entry or stay.
7. Acknowledges the Organisation of African Unity that has agreed that an international refugee day will coincide with Africa Refugee Day. Africa Refugee Day was also a celebration on 20 June every year and as a gesture to express solidarity with the continent of Africa, The United Nations, on 4 December 2000, adopted a resolution that World Refugee Day would be held on 20 June, starting in 2001. The day was the 50th anniversary of the UN's 1951 convention relating to the status of refugees. The conclusion of the resolution noted that the Organisation of African Unity would coordinate Africa Refugee Day with the new World Refugee Day.
8. World Refugee Day will be celebrated on the 20th of June. It also is celebrated during the week which is the annual activity that was organised by Austcare in Sydney 1986, which aims to inform the community about refuges and their positive contribution to the Australian society.

== Convention and protocol relating to the status of refugees ==
The Universal Declaration of Human Rights 1948 recognises the right that a person has to seek asylum from persecution in other countries, the united nation protocol has highlighted that they will indifferently and equally be reinforced to the principles that they will face no discrimination as to their sex, age, disability, sexuality, or other prohibited grounds of discrimination.

The status of refugee also highlights that the convention will include a variety of safeguards for the expulsion of refugees. It is stated that through the principles and rights of these refugee where there are no derogations that can be made. It describes this idea that a refugee will be expel or return against his or her will to a country where they feel threaten to their life.

The convention and protocol allow for refugees to have rights in a country for asylum without the persecution from their own home country.

The convention consolidates previous international instruments which also relates to refugees, and it will aim to provide the most comprehensive codification of the rights of refugees at the international level. It is a convention of a status and rights-based instrument and is ultimately under pinned by a number of fundamental principles, most notably the non-discrimination, non-penalisation and non-refoulement roles.

The convention ultimately puts down the law where basic minimum standards for the treatment of refugees, without prejudice to States granting more favourable treatment must be met. This means that refugees have the rights to have access to the courts, to primary education, to work, and the provision for documentation, including a refugee travel document in passport form.

Additionally, the Convention does not apply to those individuals for whom there are serious reasons for considering that they have committed war crimes or crimes against humanity. This also includes serious non-political crimes, or those who are guilty of acts contrary to the purposes and principles of the United Nations.

== Commemorations ==
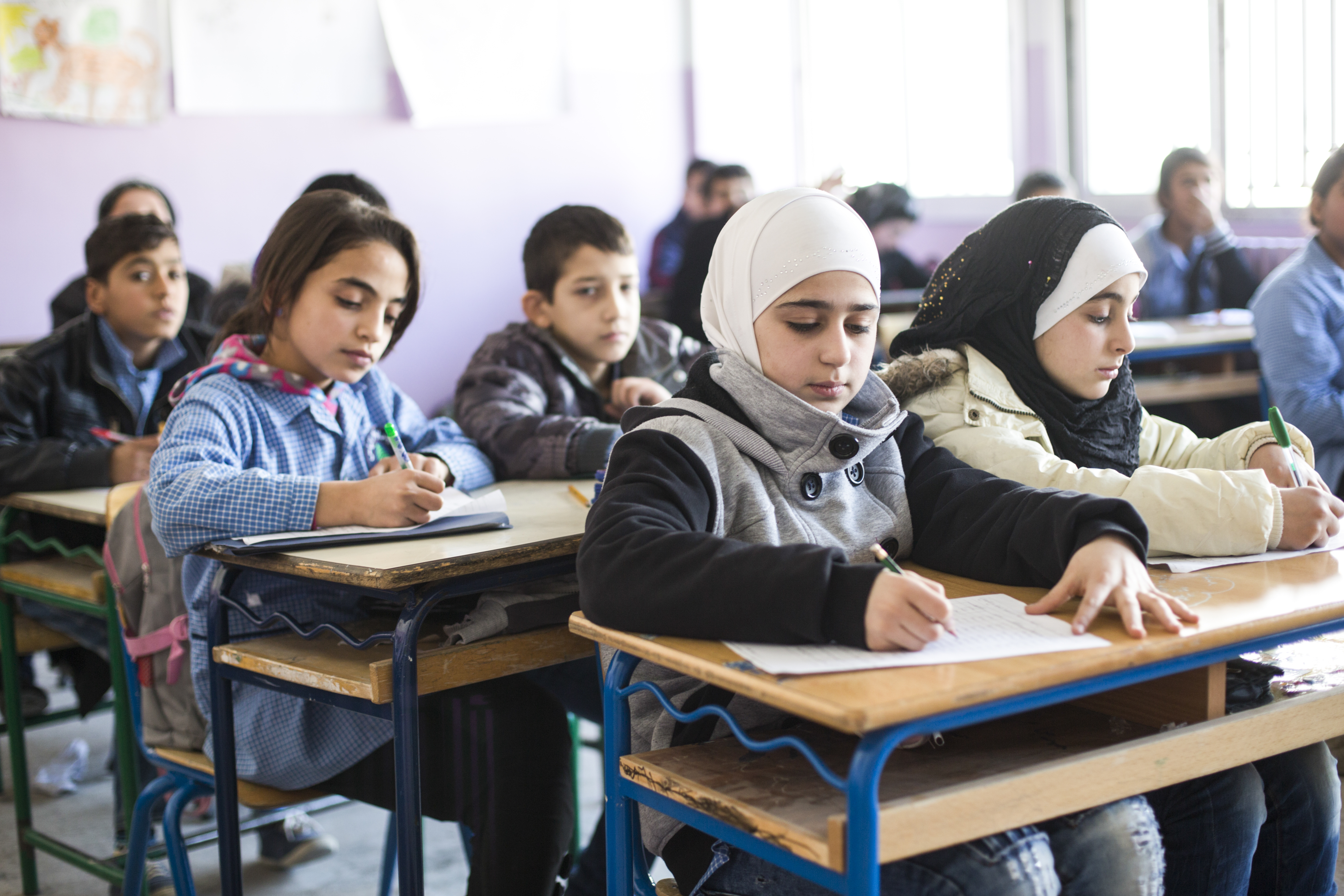
World Refugee Day aims to enable everyone to stand together to celebrate the strength, courage and perseverance of millions of individuals.

Each year on 20 June the United Nations, United Nations Refugee Agency (UNHCR) and civic groups around the world host World Refugee Day events in order to draw the public's attention to the millions of refugees and Internally displaced persons worldwide who have been forced to flee their homes due to war, conflict and persecution.

The annual commemoration is marked by a variety of events in more than 100 countries, involving government officials, humanitarian aid workers, celebrities, civilians and the forcibly displaced themselves.

The UNHCR puts out messages on each World Refugee Day:

- 2026: This year, World Refegee Day forcuses on the right of all to seek and live in safety.
- 2025: This year, World Refugee Day focuses on solidarity with refugees.
- 2024: This year, World Refugee Day focuses on solidarity with refugees – for a world where refugees are welcomed.
- 2020: The COVID-19 pandemic is a sharp reminder of how we are all intimately connected to each other and to nature.
- 2019: Filippo Grandi today pledged to do all he could to help millions of forcibly displaced people "not just to get by, but also to thrive."
- 2018: Today, World Refugee Day, is a time for solidarity with refugees

UNHCR designates a theme for each World Refugee Day campaign.

- 2023: Hope away from home. A world where refugees are always included. "This year, World Refugee Day focuses on the power of inclusion and solutions for refugees.
  "Including refugees in the communities where they have found safety after fleeing conflict and persecution is the most effective way to support them in restarting their lives and enable them to contribute to the countries hosting them.
  "It's also the best way to prepare them to return home and rebuild their countries, when conditions allow them to do so safely and voluntarily, or to thrive if they are resettled to another country."

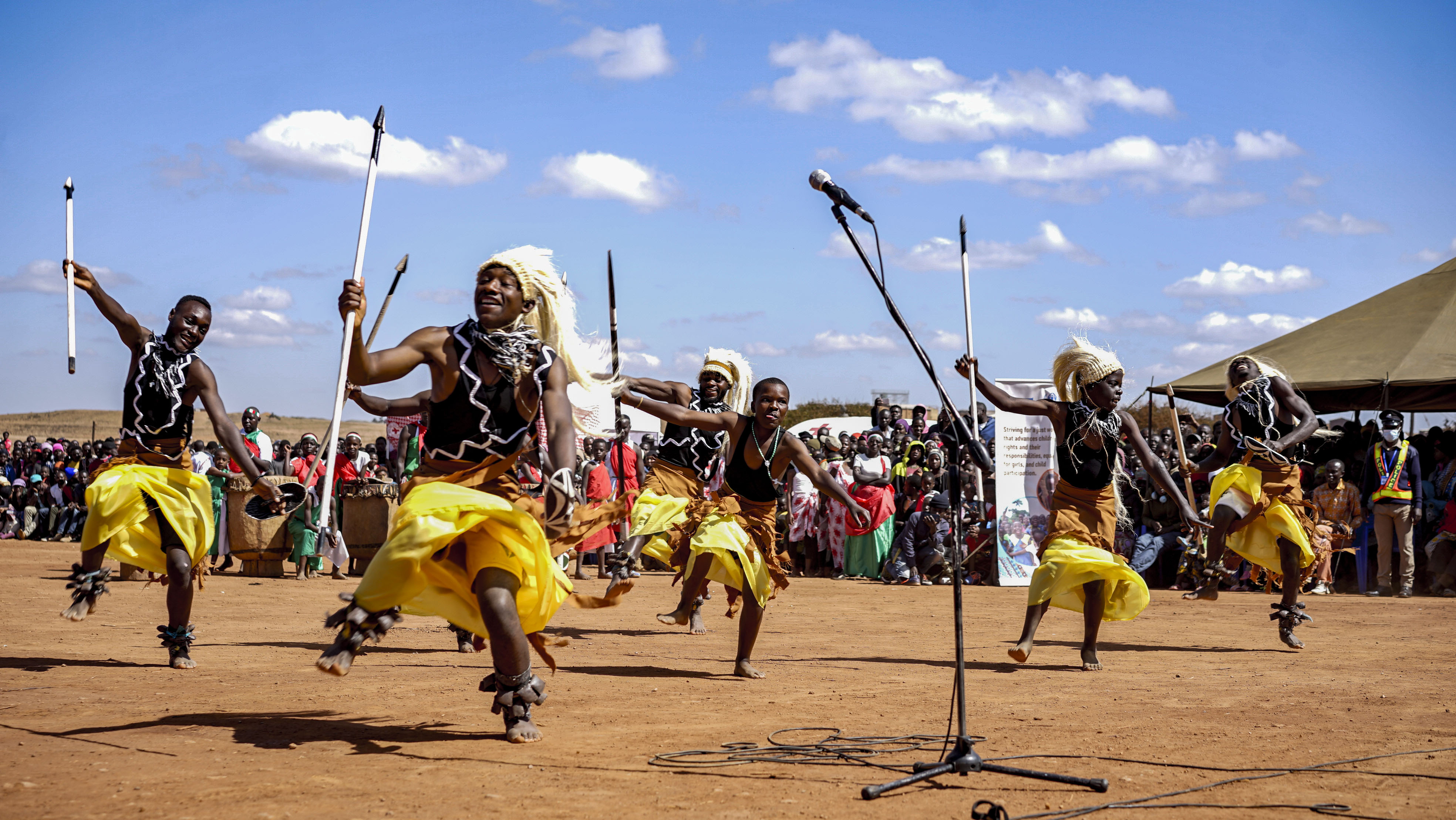
Rwandan cultural dance on World Refugee Day in 2022 in Dzaleka Refugee Camp

- 2022: Whoever. Wherever. Whenever. Everyone has the right to seek safety. "Whoever they are, people forced to flee should be treated with dignity. Anyone can seek protection, regardless of who they are or what they believe. It is non-negotiable: seeking safety is a human right.
  "Wherever they come from, people forced to flee should be welcomed. Refugees come from all over the globe. To get out of harm's way, they might take a plane, a boat, or travel on foot. What remains universal is the right to seek safety.
  "Whenever people are forced to flee, they have a right to be protected. Whatever the threat – war, violence, persecution – everyone deserves protection. Everyone has a right to be safe."
- 2021: Together we can achieve anything: 2021's theme aimed to help heal by expanding refugees' access to health care, sexual and reproductive health, nutrition, and mental health services. the concept of learn is to enable talented individuals to be provided with the opportunity to go to university and have a scholarship to ensure they are provided with a chance to use their knowledge to help others in the community. further, the concept of shine where the concept of sport is being used to enrich the lives of people forced to flee their home country and aims to boost their mental health and help them gain confidence, forge new friendships, and feel welcomed into the society that they are now in.
- 2020: Every Actions Counts

The COVID-19 pandemic along with the anti-racism protests was evidence to show how desperately the need to fight for a more inclusive and equal world, the movement where a world where no one is left behind. It highlights that everyone has to have a role to play in order to bring about change within the community. Everyone ultimately can make a difference. This aims to create the efforts to create a more just, inclusive, and equal world.

- 2019: Take A Step on World Refugee Day

This theme highlights the idea and focuses on the notion that we all need to take a step weather big or small to step in solidarity with refugees from around the globe. This day provides an opportunity to show globally that we all are with refugees every step of the way.

- 2018: Now More Than Ever, We Need to Stand with Refugees

The year aims to highlight, as the United Nations of high commissioner stated that it's time to recognise the humanity of refugees in action, it is to challenge ourselves, and others, to join them, in the aims to receive and supporting refugees in our schools, neighbourhoods, and workplaces no matter where we are.

- 2017: Embracing Refugees to celebrate our Common Humanity

The year supports refugees all over the world, the day aims to show people that they must stand with them in their plight, and honour the courage, strength and determination of women, men and children who are forced to flee their homeland though threat of persecution, conflict and violence, without having the promise of a better life.

- 2016: We stand together with refugees

With the petition of #WithRefugees petition, aims to send a message to different governments that they must work together and do their fair share for refugees and ensure that they are treated fairly and are given the same opportunities for the aims of rebuilding their lives.

- 2015: With courage let us all combine

The year aimed to show public support for refugees' courage from individuals, government officials, host communities, companies, celebrities, school children and the general public, among others.

- 2014: Migrants and Refugees: Towards a Better World

The year highlighted that although humanitarians can help as a palliative, but political solutions are needed. Without this push for change, conflict and the mass suffering of refugees will continue.

- 2013: Take 1 minute to support a family forced to flee

The year aims to concur three things, learn to listen to the stories that families have been thought, take action by attending World Refugee Day events, and Spread the word by following events on social media and share with everyone on how individuals celebrate World Refugee Day.

- 2012: 1 family torn apart by war is too many

The year urged industrialised countries not to close their doors to asylum seekers or try to lessen their obligations to refugees. The UN High Commissioner for Refugees argued "In any case, no wall will be high enough to prevent people from coming".

- 2010: 1 refugee forced to flee is too many

There are many reasons to which one must flee their country but with so many people having do leave means that everyone in their host country must give them the respect for their strength to push through.

- 2009: Real People, Real Needs

Individuals are able to show their support by participating in actives such as educating people about refugees and creating awareness of how different people's experiences are around the world.

- 2008: Protection

The nation aims to appreciate the struggle represents a humanitarian emergency, many individuals face discrimination and exclusion from the community they are in therefore by creating this day is enables people to learn the struggles of refugees and understand their perseverance in life.

- 2007: Perseverance

The international community seeks to draw attention to the plight of refugees and celebrate their courage and resilience in leaving their everyday to start a new life sometimes in a country where they are unfamiliar with the language.

- 2006: Hope

The day will shine a light on the rights, needs and dreams of refugees, helping to mobilise political will and the resources that are available so that the refugees can not only survive but also thrive in the growing community that they are in.

- 2005: Courage

All refugees have different stories of their anguish from how they have been able to leave their country and leave everything behind, they all share a common thread of uncommon courage, it is the courage not only to survive, but to persevere and rebuild their shattered lives.

- 2004: A place to call Home

This gives refugees the opportunity to feel like they belong they are faced with an uncertain future in a strange land, the sense of loss and alienation will be overwhelming. To lose one's home can be to lose one's very identity. The country aims to make these individuals feel less alienated.

- 2003: Refugee Youth: Building the Future

Education will aim to help people forced to flee build better futures, children should be given the opportunity to learn and be in a safe learning environment so that they are able to be given the future that they deserve.

- 2002: Tolerance

The day is a focus on three so-called durable solutions – repatriation to their homeland; possibilities to live in the country of first asylum; or resettlement to a third country, it aims to highlight the tolerance which is needed from an individual whom had to restart their lives with no sense of direction.

- 2001: Respect

Individuals and community groups are encouraged to mark the day by attending a local World Refugee Day event, watching and sharing World Refugee Day videos, and raising awareness for refugees on social media.

== See also ==
- International Migrants Day
- International Refugee Day campaign
- No Border network
- No one is illegal
- Right of asylum
- United Nations
- United Nations High Commissioner for Refugees
