= International Day of Women Judges =

Annual celebration of women judges

International Day of Women Judges holds every March 10 to recognize the contributions of women judges worldwide and is part of global effort to ensuring gender equality and to address gender-related judicial integrity issues. It aims to incorporate women's representation issues into judicial systems.

== Background ==
On April 26, 2021, the United Nations General Assembly declared the day by a resolution adopted by consensus. The day was observed globally for the first time on March 10, 2022.

== Internationally ==
=== Afghanistan ===
When the Taliban government came to power women judges had to hide their qualifications. They were assisted by colleagues in the UK who helped them emigrate and reestablish their careers.

=== Malawi ===
The Women Judges Association of Malawi (WOJAM) marks the International Day of Women Judges annually. In 2025 under the theme "Women in Justice and Justice for Women," it brought over 450 secondary school students into court registries in Mzuzu, Blantyre and Zomba to meet judges and observe court proceedings.
