= Jane Ansah =

Vice President of Malawi since 2025

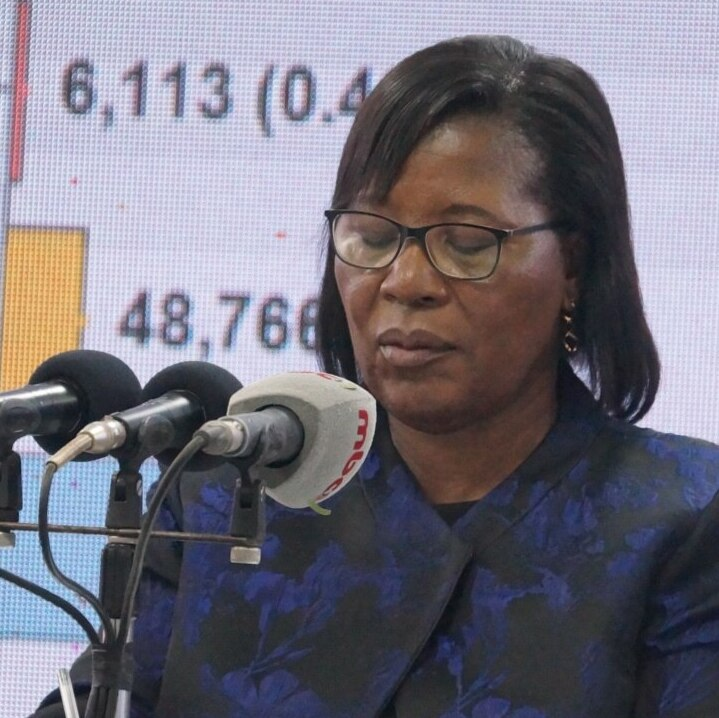
- Ansah in 2020

9th Vice-President of Malawi
- Incumbent
- Assumed office 4 October 2025
- President: Peter Mutharika
- Preceded by: Michael Usi

Chairperson of the Malawi Electoral Commission
- In office October 2016 – 21 May 2020
- Preceded by: Maxon Mbendera
- Succeeded by: Chifundo Kachale

Judge of the Supreme Court of Appeal of Malawi
- In office 2011–2016

Attorney General of Malawi
- In office 2006–2011
- Preceded by: Ralph Kasambara
- Succeeded by: Maxon Mbendera

Personal details
- Born: 11 October 1955 (age 70) Nkhoma, Lilongwe District, Federation of Rhodesia and Nyasaland (now Malawi)
- Party: Democratic Progressive Party (since 2025)
- Spouse: Bishop Dr. Joseph Addo Ansah
- Children: 3
- Education: University of Malawi; University of Nottingham
- Occupation: Judge • Politician

Jane Mayemu Ansah, S.C. (born 11 October 1955) is a Malawian politician, lawyer and from 2025, the Vice-President of Malawi.

She served as a judge on Malawi's High Court from 1998, as the first female Attorney General in Malawi from 2006 to 2011, and then as a judge on the Supreme Court of Appeal in 2011.

Ansah served as the chairperson of the Malawi Electoral Commission (MEC) from 2016 to 2020, and is most known for her actions in that position during the 2019 Malawian general election. Her role in this position sparked nation-wide protests both in support and in opposition to her role due to alleged election irregularities, leading demonstrators to call for her resignation. In July 2020, Ansah resigned and left Malawi, but in 2025 she was elected after she became a vice-presidential candidate for the Democratic Progressive Party (DPP) in Malawi.

== Career ==
Ansah served as a High Court judge from December 1998. She then served as Attorney General of Malawi from 2006 to 2011. She was appointed as a judge on the Supreme Court of Appeal in 2011. One of the appeal cases she presided over in 2015 was the divorce settlement for Rachel Sophie Sikwese, who was a fellow High Court judge.

Ansah was appointed to Chairperson of the Malawi Electoral Commission in October 2016 succeeding Justice Maxon Mbendera.

=== 2019 Malawi elections misconducts ===
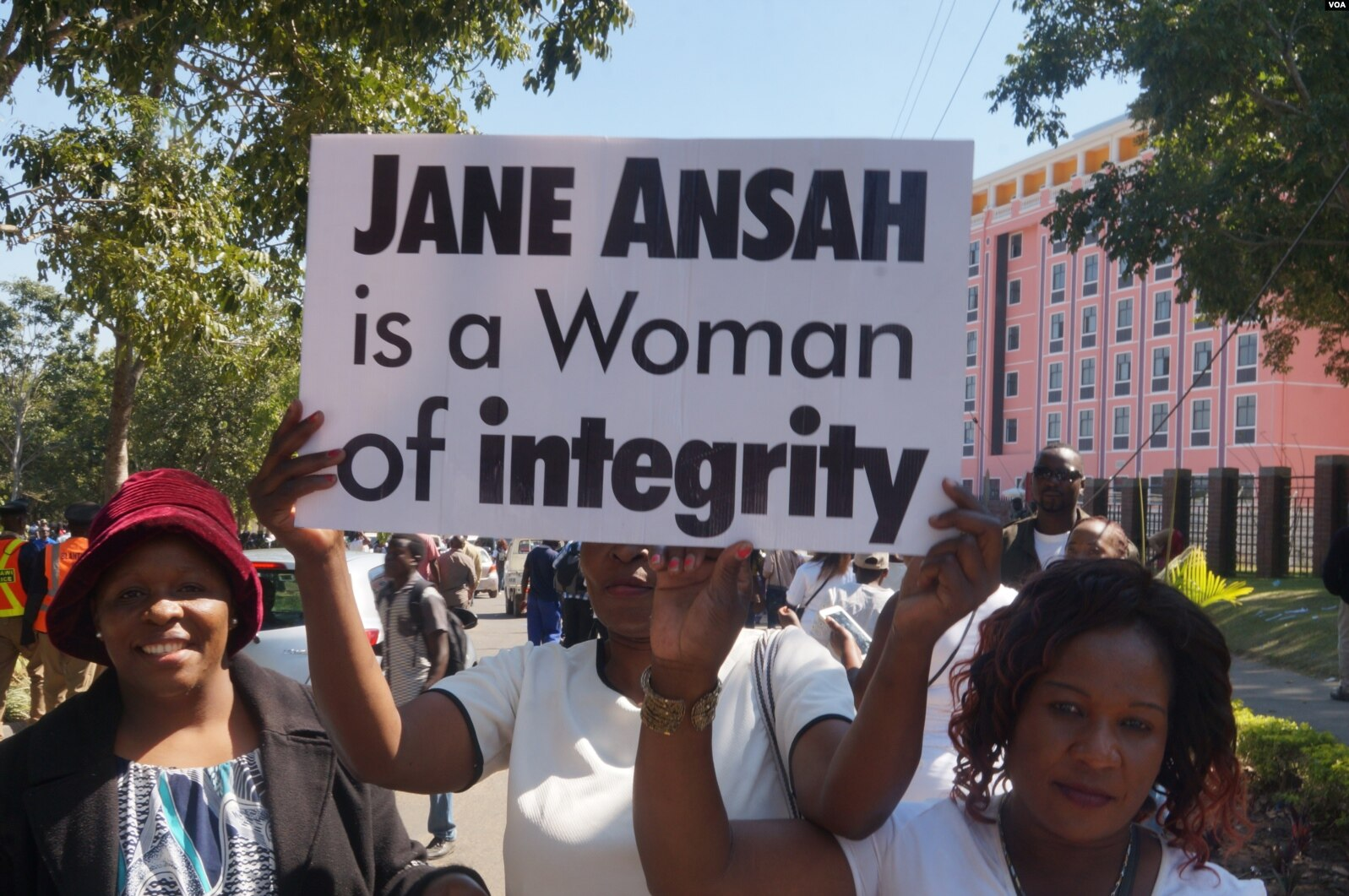
Jane Ansah supporters and placard

Ansah was accused of mismanaging the 2019 Malawian general election which led to the Jane Ansah Must Fall campaign in which nation-wide anti-Jane Ansah protests calling for her resignation occurred in June and July 2019. A group of women (pro-Jane Ansah camp), led by Seodi White and Minister of Gender Mary Navicha argued that Ansah was a victim of sexism and gender discrimination. They staged counter protests in solidarity with Jane Ansah and her role in the elections. Thousands of women marched in defense of her role in the elections, many wearing shirts written "I am Jane Ansah". Both the High Court of Malawi (sitting as a Constitutional Court) and the Supreme Court of Malawi in their respective rulings which nullified the elections, found the electoral commission under her leadership negligent.

Calls for Jane Ansah were intensified by the wave of demonstrations that were led by Civil society group Human Rights Defenders Coalition (HRDC) that was led by Timothy Mtambo, Gift Trapence, Billy Mayaya, Luke Tembo, Mcdonald Sembereka and others. Other groups also demanded that Ansah resign, with Malawi Congress Party Diaspora Network Chairperson, Chalo Mvula, also adding calls for Ansah to go.

=== Resignation ===
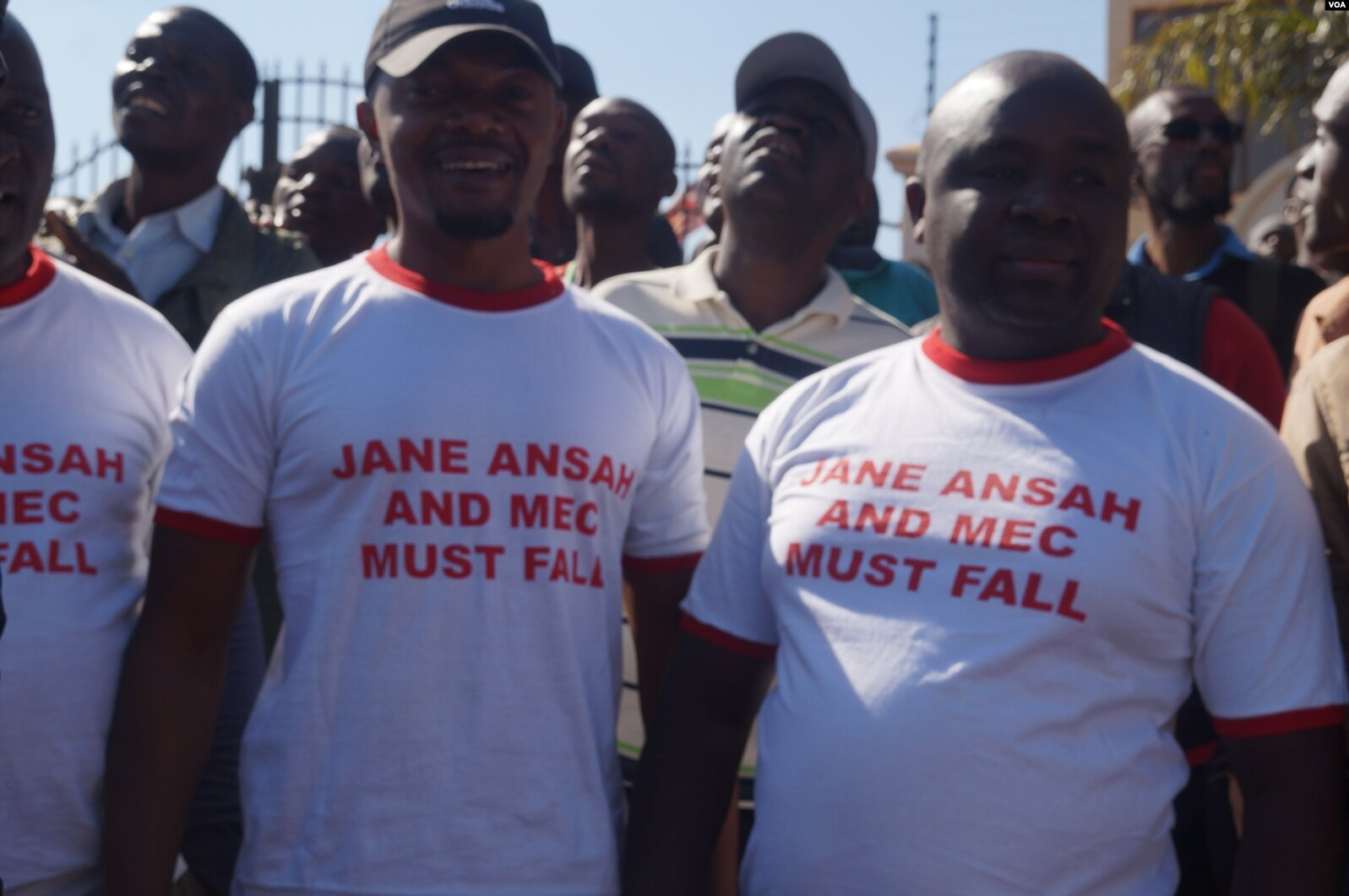
People wearing T-shirts opposing Jane Ansah

On 21 May 2020, Ansah announced her resignation as chairperson of the Malawi Electoral Commission after two successive court rulings confirmed massive irregularities in the 2019 elections. Consequently the courts ordered that fresh presidential elections be held. On 22 May 2020 President Arthur Peter Mutharika accepted her resignation. On 7 June 2020, President Mutharika appointed Justice Dr. Chifundo Kachale as the new MEC chairperson replacing Judge Ansah.

=== Continued activity in politics ===
In April 2025 she became a Democratic Progressive Party candidate for the National Assembly. In July, she became a vice-presidential candidate for the DPP, supporting ex-President Peter Mutharika. They were elected after gathering more than 50% of the votes.

== Controversies ==
In December 2025, Ansah faced public criticism for allegedly planning a private trip to the United Kingdom to attend her husband’s 80th birthday with an entourage of about 16 people at an estimated cost of K2.3 billion, which commentators said appeared to contravene government austerity measures her administration had announced to reduce public spending. In response to the criticism, on 24 December, the Government of Malawi stated that the earlier memorandum circulating about a K2.3 billion budget for the trip was fake and did not originate from any official government office. Ansah’s planned UK visit would include herself and five officials at an estimated cost of K168 million.

== Private life ==
Ansah is a married to a Ghanaian minister and they run a church in Lilongwe where they are both ministers. They have three children and one daughter is also a church minister. In 2025 they had been married for 42 years and all of their children live in the UK. In October 2025 she held a thanksgiving service at Christ-Citadel International Church in Area 47, Lilongwe to celebrate her 70th birthday.
