= Dzaleka Refugee Camp =

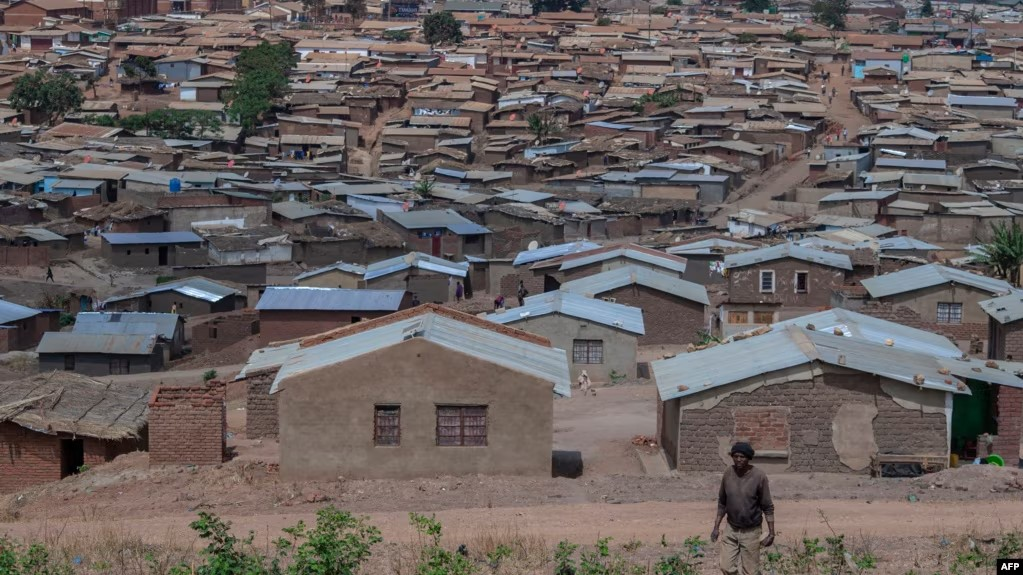
- Dzaleka Refugee Camp in 2024

- Location in Malawi
- Country: Malawi
- Region: Dowa District

Government
  - Camp Manager: Gerald Chiganda (2025)
- Time zone: GMT
  - Summer (DST): GMT
- Website: Dzaleka.com

Dzaleka Refugee Camp is in Malawi's Dowa District, 41 kilometres from Lilongwe. 93% of the approximately 52,000 people (in 2024) who live there are women or children. Nearly all of Malawi's refugees live here. The new refugees originate from the Democratic Republic of the Congo, Burundi, Rwanda, and Somalia but they have arrived from elsewhere. The UNHCR and the Malawian government made the camp a home for refugees in 1994.

== History ==
The camp is in the highlands of Malawi's Dowa District, about forty kilometres from Lilongwe It had been a prison for political prisoners. There were less than a hundred prisoners there in 1960 farming sisal and creating string, rope and mats. By the 1970s, the farm now had about 400 prisoners and the conditions were described as appalling with regular beatings and torture. Reading material was minimal - it included the Bible and the Koran. Three of the prisoners, John Liwomba, Bernard Njakare and George Ndomondo would later enter the church as ministers.

During the 1990s there was political unrest and strife in Somalia (1991), Burundi (1993), Rwanda (1994) and the DRC (1993). Hundreds of thousands of refugees sought shelter from genocide, rape and war in nearby countries. Malawi was not an obvious destination geographically but it was relatively peaceful. Some refugees sheltered in Tanzania and the DRC and then continued on to Malawi.

Dzaleka became a refugee camp in 1994, after an agreement was made with the UNHCR and refugees were moved from Lilongwe market to here. There were initially about a thousand, but by 2003 there were 6,000. In 2008 it was 10,000 and in 2010 it was 16,000. The camp was designed to take 12,000 residents. The refugees are not given access to Malawian citizenship and with the exception of a few patients in Queen Elizabeth Central Hospital they are denied access to the facilities open to citizens. It was reported in 2012 that shops set up outside the camp by refugees were attacked and looted as locals objected to the competition.

Most of the residents are from the Democratic Republic of the Congo with less from Burundi, Ethiopia, Rwanda and Somali. The camp has been supported by UNHCR since it began. The camp did not appear on the official map of Malawi in 2011.

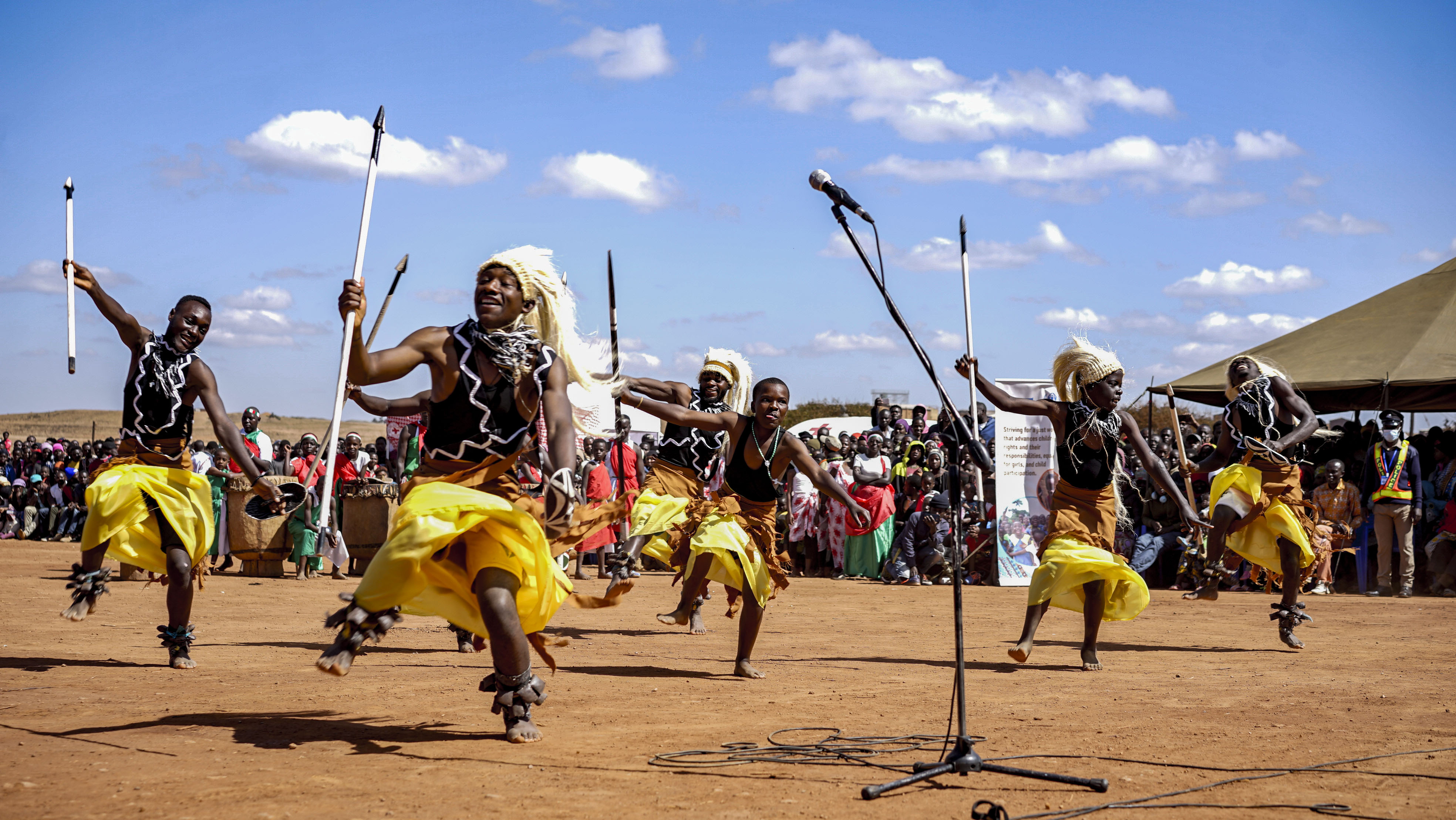
Rwandan cultural dance on World Refugee Day 2022 in Dzaleka

In 2014, Trésor Nzengu Mpauni (aka Menes La Plume), who was a refugee from Lubumbashi, started what became an annual arts and culture event called the Tumaini Festival. The festival became the largest source of external funding as it attracted 50,000 people who came to see over 100 artists in 2023.

In 2017 the Women Judges Association of Malawi marked the 16 Days of Activism against Gender-Based Violence at Dzaleka Refugee Camp in keeping with that year's campaign theme, "leave no one behind". Its programmes coordinator, Justice Zione Ntaba, said many women and girls did not report gender-based violence because they believed that being poor meant justice would not favour them, and urged judges not to take sides in such cases. The leader of the group Women in Action at the camp, Cecilia Pango, said women often suffered in silence, partly through fear of attackers within the camp who came from different countries.

At the end of 2020 two Malawians, Ndapile Mkuwu and Zola Manyungwa, decided to use OpenStreetMap to create a map of the refugee camp. They created a project named MapMalawi. They were undergraduates at the University of Malawi. They obtained a grant and permission to fly drones over the camp. The pictures from the drones allowed local volunteers and the African Drone and Data Academy to create a map. The map showed water points, dumping sites, schools and hospitals.

== Education and innovation ==
Dzaleka Refugee Camp has developed a growing education sector supported by humanitarian organizations, community-led initiatives, and refugee volunteers. The camp contains Dzaleka CDSS primary school and other primary and secondary schools, early childhood centers and vocational training programs. Due to rapid population growth and limited infrastructure, many schools experience overcrowding, shortages of learning materials, and limited classroom space.

In addition to formal education, refugee-led organizations and youth groups within the camp provide tutoring, language classes, digital literacy training, and vocational skills programs. Some students participate in online and distance-learning opportunities offered through partnerships with international institutions and non-governmental organizations.

Community initiatives have included computer training, media production, small business development, and digital mapping projects such with OpenStreetMap and drone-based mapping programs used to improve humanitarian planning and infrastructure documentation.

Education in Dzaleka is supported by the camp's own culture.

== 2024 and on ==
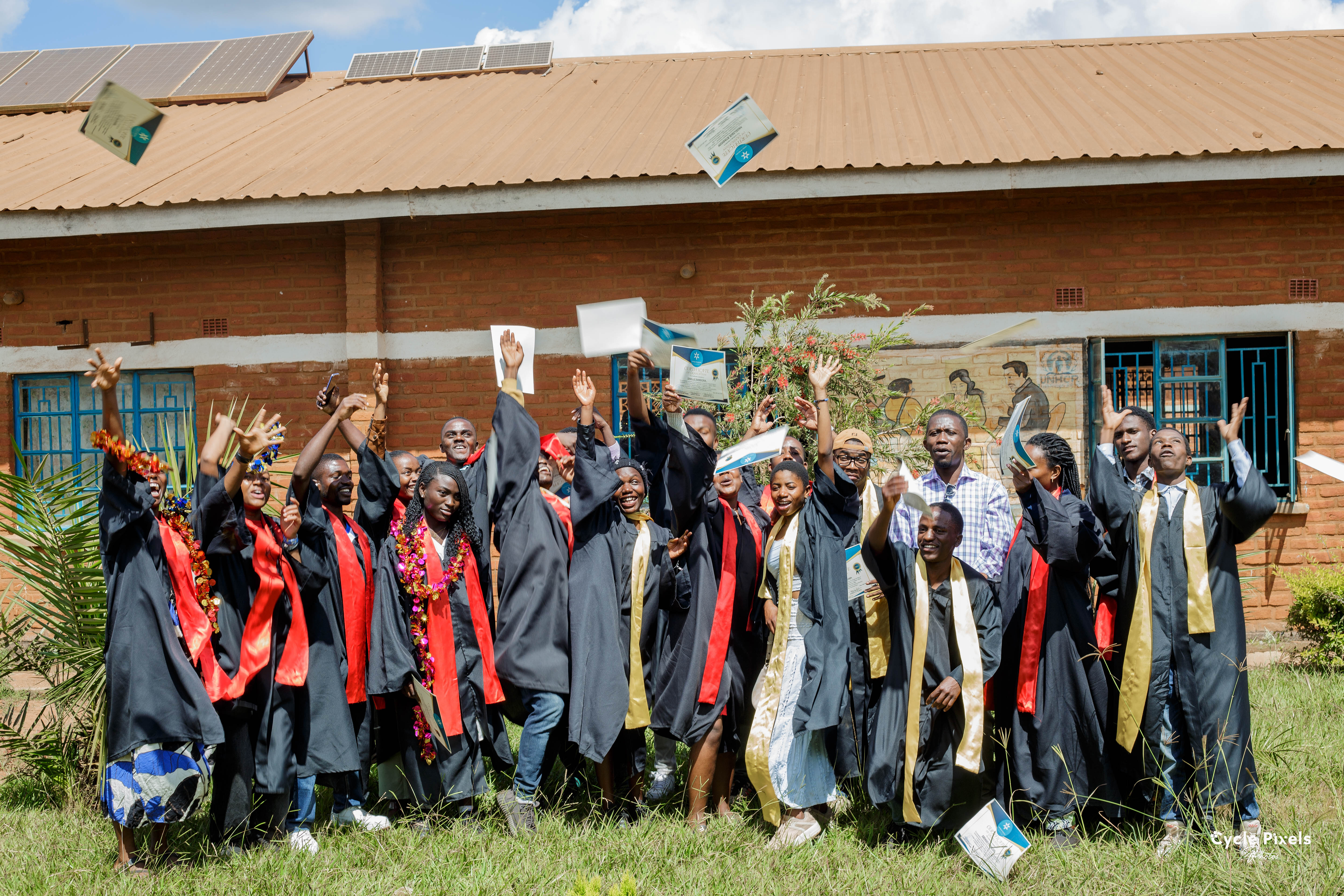
Umoja Ni Nguvu 2026 graduates

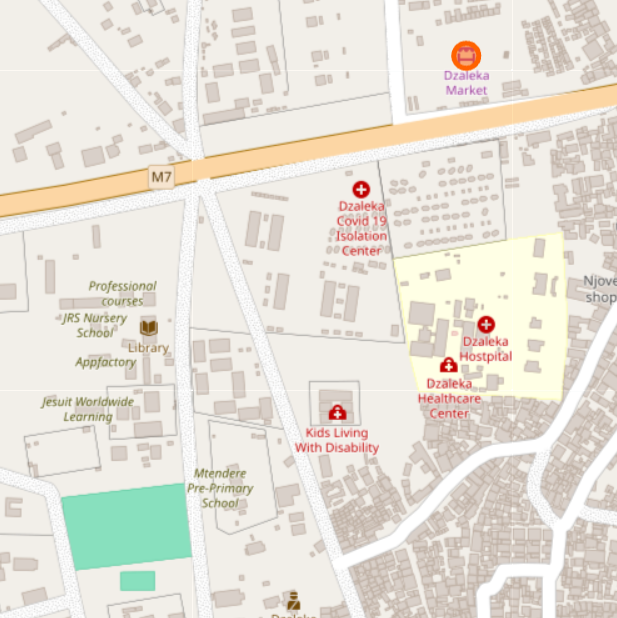
OpenStreetmap of Dzaleka market, hospital and school in 2025

93% of the approximately 52,000 people (in 2024) who live there are women or children. Nearly all of Malawi's refugees live here as the total is estimated to be below 57,000 in 2024. At that time there were 300 new refugees in the camp every day. The camp feeds itself by subsistence farming.

New refugees in 2024 originate from the DRC, Burundi, and Rwanda. In 2024 Malawi's government was planning a new refugee camp to ease overcrowding.

In 2024 4,000 households shared an insurance payout that was innovative. Humanitarian groups had taken out insurance against bad weather. The El Nino phenomena had led to crop failures. The amount of money received ($33 per household per month) would not cover the cost of lost crops but it would help to mitigate some of the effects.

A major income in the camp comes from people smuggling. Ethiopians pay criminal gangs to smuggle them into South Africa where they can work for friends and relatives. The Ethiopians are billeted with people living in the camp and they can earn substantial sums. If people assist with taking them to the border they can be paid a good sum for a single activity. The police try and crack down but they are bribed. Despite the income the people of Dzaleka want the smuggling to stop because they see how the Ethiopians are treated badly.

The UNHCR announced in 2025 that they had only 12% of the funds required to support the refugees who live there. This is at a time when the World Food Programme is also reducing its support. Payments of $10.30 to family members were reduced to less than $9 in February, and there were no more payments planned. 200 new refugees arrived each month and the number of UNHCR workers was reduced from over 40 to 3 as international funding cuts made their effect.

== Media and community platforms ==
Refugee-led digital platforms such as Dzaleka.com and Dzaleka Service have emerged to document community activities, education, entrepreneurship, and cultural life within the camp.
