= Francis Belle =

Barbadian lawyer and judge

Francis Belle is a Barbadian lawyer and judge who has worked as a lawyer and a judge in a number of Commonwealth countries in the Caribbean.

== Career ==
Belle earned Bachelor of Arts and Bachelor of Laws degrees from the University of the West Indies. From 1986 to 1993, he worked as a lawyer in Bridgetown, Barbados. In 1993, he moved to the British Virgin Islands where he worked as Crown counsel until 1997. In 1997, Belle moved to Saint Kitts and Nevis where he worked as the Director of Public Prosecutions for two years; he moved back to the British Virgin Islands in 1998 and worked with a law firm until 2003. In 2003, he was awarded a Master of Arts in Conflict Analysis and Resolution from Nova Southeastern University.

In 2004, Belle was appointed by the Judicial and Legal Services Commission of the Caribbean Community as a High Court Judge of the Eastern Caribbean Supreme Court. In this role, his first assignment was to reside in and hear cases from Grenada. In 2005, his assignment was changed to sitting on the High Court in Saint Kitts and Nevis. He remained in Saint Kitts until 2010, when he was transferred to sit on the High Court in Saint Lucia.

In 2019 he was elected to serve half-time as a judge in the United Nations Dispute Tribunal, began the seven year appointment at the same time as Justice Eleanor Donaldson-Honeywell of Trinidad and Tobago, Justice Rachel Sophie Sikwese of Malawi and Justice Margaret Tibulya of Uganda.
