= National Registration Bureau =

Government department responsible for civil registration and identity in Malawi

Agency overview
- Formed: 2007 (established in policy/implementation); National Registration Act 2010 (statutory mandate)
- Preceding agency: Registrar General
- Jurisdiction: Malawi
- Headquarters: Capital Hill Lilongwe, Malawi
- Minister responsible: Peter Mukhito
- Agency executive: Patrick Machika, Principal Secretary
- Parent agency: Ministry of Home Affairs and Internal Security (Government of Malawi)
- Website: https://www.nrb.gov.mw/

National Registration Bureau (NRB) is the government department of the Republic of Malawi responsible for civil registration (births, deaths, marriages), registration of persons (national identity), and for establishing and maintaining the National Registration and Identification System (NRIS). The NRB is administered under the Ministry of Home Affairs and Internal Security and operates under the National Registration Act (2010).

NRB implements and maintains Malawi’s civil registration and national identification systems. Its core responsibilities are registering vital events (births, deaths, marriages), issuing related certificates, and managing identity documents for citizens and resident foreigners. The NRB also leads the roll-out and maintenance of the National Registration and Identification System (NRIS), a digital platform intended to provide a single, interoperable identity backbone for government and private-sector services.

== History and legal basis ==
The modern statutory framework for national registration in Malawi is provided by the National Registration Act (2010), which establishes the registration system, provides for appointment of a Director (Registrar), and sets out powers, offences and record-keeping requirements. The NRB’s functions and responsibilities were later operationalised through government policy, project investments and decentralisation to district registration offices.

Malawi’s push to build an integrated National Registration and Identification System (NRIS) accelerated in the 2010s with technical and financial support from development partners (including UNDP, USAID, the European Union and other agencies). The NRB commenced issuance of birth and death certificates nationwide in August 2015 and has since undertaken mass registration exercises and system pilots towards universal coverage.

== Mandate and functions ==
Under statute and government policy, NRB’s principal functions include:

- Establishing, managing and maintaining the National Registration and Identification System (NRIS).
- Registration of births, deaths, marriages and other vital events and issuance of certified certificates.
- Registration of citizens and issuance of National Identity Cards (for Malawians aged 16 and over) and identity cards for resident foreigners.
- Providing registration data and vital statistics for planning, governance and service delivery.
- Coordinating district registration offices and training registration staff; integrating registration points at health facilities and other public service outlets.
- The NRB’s mandate emphasises both civil registration (vital events) and population identification (IDs), aligning civil registry data with the digital identity database to enable a single source of identity for public and private services.

== Organisation and governance ==
The NRB is organised as a government department reporting to the Minister responsible for Home Affairs and Internal Security. Its internal structure is typically presented in an organisational chart (organogram) that includes a Director (Registrar), deputy directors, technical units (registration, ICT/NRIS, vital statistics, legal/compliance, corporate services), and decentralised district registration offices operating through District Commissioner offices.

NRB works through a combination of centralised systems (national database and head office functions) and devolved operations (district registration offices, health-facility registration points and other partner registration locations) to reach rural and urban populations.

== Key initiatives and projects ==
=== National Registration and Identification System (NRIS) ===
NRIS is the NRB’s core digital programme: a national database and IT platform that links civil registration records (births, deaths, marriages) to identity records and identity-management processes (enrolment, biometric capture for persons aged 16+, card issuance, renewals and identity verification). The NRIS project has been supported by international partners and development finance to build systems, procurement, training and rollout.

=== Mass registration and ID issuance (2017 onward) ===
NRB carried out mass registration drives (notably the nationwide registration of citizens for national ID issuance starting in 2017) to expand coverage of identity documentation for persons aged 16 and above and de-duplicate identity records. These drives aimed to provide secure identity credentials and to support inclusion in services such as banking and social programmes.

=== Civil registration improvements & decentralisation ===
Since 2015 NRB has expanded the issuance of birth and death certificates and worked to decentralise registration to district offices and health facilities (including partnerships with the Christian Health Association of Malawi and public hospitals) to improve timely registration of vital events. NRB has published forms and procedural guidance to standardise registration at health and community levels.

=== Strategic planning and donor partnership ===
NRB has developed multi-year strategic plans (for example the 2025–2030 strategic plan) and engaged partners (UNDP, EU, IOM, USAID and others) to support capacity building, system integration, digital ID solutions (including mobile/digital ID options) and improved vital statistics for planning.

== Partnerships and funding ==
To implement NRIS and civil registration reforms, NRB collaborates with a range of partners: UNDP (technical and coordination support), USAID, the European Union, IOM, UNICEF (on CRVS strengthening), bilateral donors and civil society organisations. Funding has supported system procurement, training, field pilots, outreach campaigns and the production/distribution of certificates and identity cards.

== Importance and impacts ==
A functioning NRB and a reliable civil registration and national identity system underpin a range of governance and development outcomes:

- Legal identity — enables citizens to prove age, nationality and identity, which is necessary for access to education, health, voting, banking and social protection.
- Public administration & planning — accurate vital statistics and identity data support evidence-based planning, resource allocation and service delivery.
- Financial inclusion & security — the National ID has been adopted by some national regulators and institutions as primary ID for financial transactions, facilitating customer identification and anti-fraud measures.

== Challenges and criticisms ==
Public reports and civil society statements have highlighted implementation challenges common to national registration programmes, including:

- Coverage gaps — under-registration of births and incomplete coverage in remote areas remain challenges for achieving universal civil registration.
- Operational constraints — needs for continued investment in ICT systems, staff training, logistics for card production/distribution and decentralised service delivery.
- Privacy, data protection and trust — as NRIS centralises identity and biometric data, stakeholders (including civil society) stress the need for robust legal and technical safeguards on data protection, transparency about use of data and redress mechanisms during mass registration exercises. Civil society groups have issued public statements during registration drives urging safeguards and clarity.

NRB and partners have publicly acknowledged these issues and are pursuing system improvements, legal/operational safeguards and outreach to increase uptake and trust.
