= Anastasia Msosa =

Malawian judge

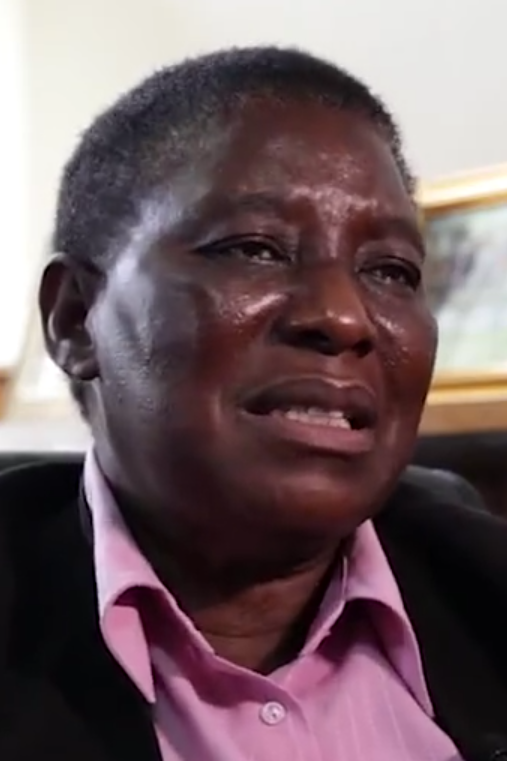
- Chief Justice Msosa in 2015

Chief Justice of Malawi
- In office 2013–2015
- Preceded by: Lovemore Munlo
- Succeeded by: Andrew Nyirenda

Personal details
- Born: 1950 (age 75–76) Malawi
- Profession: Judge

Anastasia Msosa (born 1950) is a Malawian judge who served as Chief Justice of Malawi from 2013 to 2015. She was the first woman to hold the position. She previously served as chairperson of the Malawi Electoral Commission and played a role in overseeing the country's early multiparty elections.

== Life ==
Msosa was born in 1950 in the country in Dedza. Her mother could not write and her father was a veterinarian. She was one of seven children. She attended Likuni Girls school before she was of three girls in a class of fifty at Bunda College of Agriculture. She decided to study law and after completing the onerous requirements and the course, she graduated aged 2025 from Chancellor College in Zomba.

Msosa began her legal career as a state advocate in 1975 and later worked in the Department of Legal Aid. In 2000, she was appointed Registrar General.

In 1992, she became the first Malawian woman appointed as a judge of the High Court. She was elevated to the Supreme Court of Appeal in 1997.

She served as the first woman chairperson of the Malawi Electoral Commission from 1993 to 1998, overseeing the country's first multiparty elections, and was later reappointed to the position from 2004 to 2012.

In 2013, she was appointed Chief Justice of Malawi, succeeding Lovemore Munlo. She retired in 2015 upon reaching the mandatory retirement age.

In February 2014 the Women Judges Association of Malawi held a dinner at the Bingu International Convention Centre in Lilongwe to mark her life and career, at which President Joyce Banda presented her with an award.

== Personal life ==
Msosa is married to accountant Anderson Msosa and they have seven children.
