= Malawi Law Commission =

Malawian Law Commission

Malawi Electoral Commission
Agency overview
- Formed: 1994; 32 years ago
- Jurisdiction: Malawi
- Status: Independent regulatory agency
- Headquarters: Lilongwe, Malawi
- Agency executive: Rosemary Kanyuka, Law Commission
- Website: lawcom.gov.mw/

The Malawi Law Commission is a constitutional body established in 1994 by the new constitution after the population voted for a multi-party state.

== History ==
Although the constitution was created in 1994, the first Law Commissioner was not appointed until 1996, and the commission did not become fully operational until 1998. The Law Commission Act operated from July 1998. The commission is required to be independent on any authority. The law commissioner also serves as a member of the Malawi Human Rights Commission.

The first Law Commissioner was Justice Elton Singini, a High Court judge, who was appointed in 1996. He served for just over a decade. Gertrude Hiwa was appointed Law Commissioner in June 2008 and was reappointed in 2013.

In 2015 the commission recommended that the existing abortion laws should be liberalised. They argued that this would reduce the number of women who died as a result of illegal abortions.

Rosemary Kanyuka was appointed Law Commissioner in August 2018 by the president of Malawi for a five-year term. She received a salary, a fuel and air travel allowance and medical aid.

In 2024 Kanyuka address parliament's legal affairs committee to encourage them to address the problem that the existing laws were not being complied with. She gave an example of the vagrancy laws which although they contained archaic terms like vagabond they were effective laws. In 2017 the vagrancy laws had been declared unconstitutional whereas they just needed to be applied correctly.
