= Rizine Mzikamanda =

Malawian judge

Rezine Robert Mzikamanda is a Malawian judge who has served as the Chief Justice of Malawi since he was officially appointed to the position on 7 January 2022 by President of Malawi Lazarus Chakwera.

Mzikamanda chaired the board of the Women Judges Association of Malawi in 2017, while serving as a judge of the Malawi Supreme Court of Appeal.
