= Seodi White =

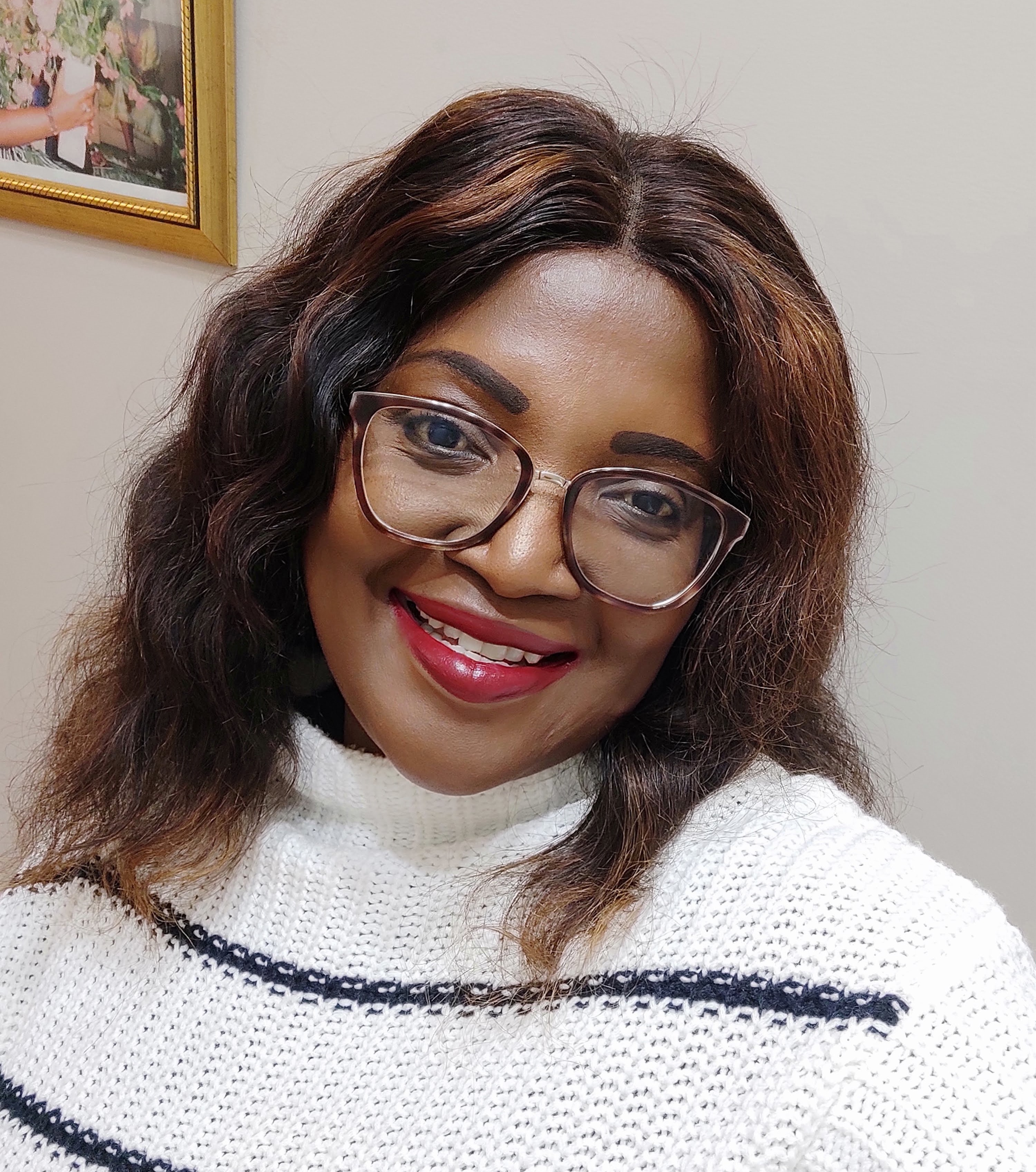
- Seodi White
- Citizenship: Malawi
- Education: LL.B. (Law) University of Botswana Master’s University of Sussex
- Occupation: Lawyer Women's Right Activist
- Awards: Malawi Human Rights Commission Award

Seodi Venekai-Rudo White is a social development lawyer and women's rights activist. She was Chief Director responsible for Public Sector Reforms in the Office of the President and Cabinet from 2017 until September 2020.

== Life ==
White obtained her law degree from the University of Botswana and is admitted to practice as an attorney in Botswana. She has a master's degree in Gender and Development from the University of Sussex in the United Kingdom. She is certified in Complete Modern Law Practice Curriculum provided by The Institute for the Future of Law Practice.

White formed the Women and Law in Southern Africa Malawi Office (WLSA Malawi) in 1998 where she oversaw implementation of 19 research, training and advocacy programmes with results including reforms in national law, including the passing of the “Prevention of Domestic Violence Act 2006” which is a law in Malawi which protects of women in Malawi from the shackles of domestic violence and recognises their dignity and provides for security in the home. In addition, she also facilitated the passing of the “Deceased Estates (Inheritance, Succession and Protection) Act 2011” which is a law that criminalises the dispossession of widows upon the death of their husbands and therefore offers enhanced protection of women's rights particularly protection from poverty and hardship when their spouses die. White has also fought against violence against women, and child marriage. She has given a TED lecture on some of the strategies used to overcome gender bias and injustice.

In 2017 she became a full-time civil servant when the President appointed her Chief Director for Public Reforms at the Office of President and Cabinet. She was Chief Director responsible for Public Sector Reforms in the Office of the President and Cabinet Malawi until September 2020. She led the public sector reforms programme in the government of Malawi and as well as in State Owned Corporations (SOEs). She coordinated the initiation of reforms in ministries, agencies and departments. She provided Technical and Strategic Leadership in the development of two key strategic and ground-breaking Policies namely, The Malawi National Public Sector Reforms Policy and the National Public Service Management Policy. These policies are aimed at revitalising the public service in Malawi. She provided technical advice and leadership in the development and approval of Malawi's new Public Service Bill which had not been reviewed since its initial inception in 1994. This Bill aims to strengthen accountability, performance, and coordination in Malawi's Public Service.

In 2007, she taught Graduate Studies at the University of Toronto as a Dame Nita Barrow Visiting Scholar where she gave a public lecture on Feminisation of HIV. She has taught courses at the International Law Institute (ILI) in Kampala Uganda in 2010 and 2011. She is also a guest lecturer at University of North Carolina, Department of African, African American, and Diaspora Studies and Curriculum in Global Studies where she has been teaching Change Management and Gender Justice since 2007 intermittently.

== Publications ==
=== Books ===
- White, Seodi Venekai-Rudo; Kachika, Tinyade; Chipasula, Maggie; Ngwira, N. (2005). White, Seodi Venekai-Rudo (ed.). Women in Malawi: A Profile of Women in Malawi. Beyond inequalities. Women and Law in Southern Africa, Research and Education Trust. ISBN 9781779100245.
- White, Seodi Venekai-Rudo (2002). Dispossessing the Widow: Gender Based Violence in Malawi. Kachere Books. Christian Literature Association in Malawi. ISBN 9789990816556.
- Bonga, Violet; White, Seodi (2000). In search of justice: Women and the administration of justice. Dzuka Publishing Company. ISBN 9789990817690.

=== Book chapters ===
- Kanyongolo, Ngeyi Ruth; White, Seodi (2017). "Legislating against the Odds: Lessons Learned from Efforts to Legislate against Marital Rape in Malawi". In Randall, Melanie; Koshan, Jennifer; Nyaundi, Patricia (eds.). The Right to Say No: Marital Rape and Law Reform in Canada, Ghana, Kenya and Malawi. Bloomsbury Professional. ISBN 9781782258605.

=== Articles ===
- Kathewera-Banda, Maggie; Gomile-Chidyaonga, Flossie; Hendriks, Sarah; Kachika, Tinyade; Mitole, Zunzo; White, Seodi (9 March 2006). "Sexual violence and women's vulnerability to HIV transmission in Malawi: a rights issue". International Social Science Journal. 57 (186): 649–660. doi:10.1111/j.1468-2451.2005.00582.x.
- White, Seodi (2010-02-01). "Extreme poverty and its impact on women's vulnerability to HIV transmission: a rights issue". The International Journal of Human Rights. 14 (1): 75–91. doi:10.1080/13642980902933704. ISSN 1364-2987. S2CID 145173620.
- White, Seodi (2005). Can the Law Reduce HIV Transmission among Women?. Southern African Regional Gender Mainstreaming Symposium.

== Accolades ==
- Malawi Human Rights Commission Award - 2004
