= Women Judges Association of Malawi =

Association of judicial officers in Malawi

- Abbreviation: WOJAM
- Formation: 2011; 15 years ago
- Type: Nonprofit
- Location: Malawi
- Board Chair: Rizine Mzikamanda
- President: Jean Kayira
- Affiliations: International Association of Women Judges
- Website: https://www.wojam.org/

The Women Judges Association of Malawi (WOJAM) is a professional association of judicial officers in Malawi and the Malawian chapter of the International Association of Women Judges (IAWJ). Registered in 2011, it works to improve women's access to justice through research on gender-related law, public legal education, training of justice sector actors and mentorship, and its membership is also open to male judicial officers.

== History ==
In February 2014 WOJAM organised a fundraising dinner at the Bingu International Conference Centre in Lilongwe to mark the life and career of Anastasia Msosa, the first woman to serve as Chief Justice of Malawi, at which President Joyce Banda (the first woman to serve as president of Malawi) presented her with an award. Proceeds of the dinner were to support people in need.

== Governance ==
The association has both a president and a board chair. In 2017 the president was Justice Esme Chombo of the High Court. While the board was chaired by Justice Rezine Mzikamanda of the Malawi Supreme Court of Appeal who later became Chief Justice of Malawi. Justice Jean Kayira of the High Court was president as of 2025; Justice Fiona Mwale served as the associations national training coordinator; and, Justice Zione Ntaba served as the programs coordinator in 2017.

== Activities ==
WOJAM works to improve women's access to justice through training of judicial officers and other criminal justice actors, public legal education, and legal clinics and camp courts run with the Women Lawyers Association of Malawi. It has argued for a more proportionate number of female judicial officers and for court facilities within reach of rural communities, noting that people in areas without a nearby court must travel long distances or meet transport costs to seek judicial services.

In September2016 the association ran training to orient the courts on the Trafficking in Persons Act. Its national training coordinator, Justice Mwale said that the Act required courts to take account of victims' needs rather than focusing only on punishing offenders and that sentencing should address compensation, counselling and medical treatment as well as the tracing of assets and proceeds.

In March 2017 WOJAM hosted a three-day judicial exchange programme in Lilongwe with the South African chapter of the International Association of Women Judges, drawing 60 participants from the two countries, in collaboration with the Democratic Governance and Rights Unit of the University of Cape Town. The association's president, Esme Chombo, said that magistrates in remote areas often wait a long time for copies of newly enacted legislation, so that some decisions do not reflect current law, and that WOJAM had begun a sensitization campaign to make new legislation more accessible to magistrates and the public outside the main centres.

In December 2017 the association marked the 16 Days of Activism against Gender-Based Violence at the Dzaleka Refugee Camp in Dowa, holding the event with refugees and asylum seekers in keeping with that year's campaign theme, "leave no one behind". Its programmes coordinator, Justice Zione Ntaba, said many women and girls did not report gender-based violence because they believed that being poor meant justice would not favour them, and urged judges not to take sides in such cases. The leader of the women at the camp, Cecilia Pango, said women there often suffered in silence,partly through fear of attackers with the camp who came from different countries.

WOJAM also runs a Nzotheka programme, promoting girls' education through school visits and role modeling. In January 2025 the association named Alice Catherine Kavwejne, a woman in her nineties from Ntchisi who had educated eleven children alone after her husbands death in 1982, as a role model under the programme. The association has also run school visits in Balaka and Ntchisi and has spoken publicly on the dignity and rights of elderly people.

WOJAM marks the International Day of Women Judges annually on 10 March. In 2025 under the theme "Women in Justice and Justice for Women," it brought 454 secondary school students into court registries in Mzuzu, Blantyre and Zomba to meet judges and observe court proceedings.

== Sexual violence project ==
Between March 2017 and February 2019 WOJAM ran a project with the International Association of Women Judges title "Women Judges Lead the Fight to Demand Justice and Accountability for Sexual Violence." financed by the United Nations Trust Fund to End Violence against Women. The project aimed to improve how Malawian criminal justice actors investigate, prosecute, adjudicate and sentence sexual violence cases and how they treat complainants, and to give women and girls better knowledge of their rights and how to report sexual violence. The project ran in the four judicial divisions of Lilongwe, Blantyre, Zomba and Mzuzu.

== Partnerships ==
In November 2017 EOJAM signed a Memorandum of Association with the Lilongwe Urban Women Forum, funded by ActionAid Malawi, under which the association agreed to run literacy programmes with the forum's members and to support women in peri-urban Lilongwe through literacy work and outreach clinics. the agreement was signed at Chinsapo Township in Lilongwe.

In May 2026 WOJAM was among six institutions that signed a three-year memorandum of understanding with the Gender and Justice Unit (GJU) to strengthen legal and psychosocial services for survivors of gender-based violence in eleven districts. The other signatories were the Legal Aid Bureau, the National Initiative for Civic Education Trust, Trust Psychosocial Support Services and Malawi Police FM.

== See also ==
- Judiciary of Malawi
- International Association of Women Judges
- Women Lawyers Association of Malawi
