= Gertrude Hiwa =

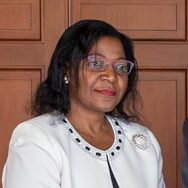
- in 2018
- Education: University of Malawi's Chancellor College and the University of the West Indies
- Occupation: lawyer
- Known for: Solicitor general

Gertrude Lynn Hiwa is a Malawian lawyer and law commissioner. She was appointed as Malawi's Law Commissioner in 2008 and 2013. She then became the Solicitor general in 2018. She served until 2020 and she was reappointed in 2025.

== Life ==
Hiwa graduated in law from the University of Malawi's Chancellor College in 1992. She then studied for her master's degree at the University of the West Indies which she obtained in 1996.

Hiwa was appointed as a Law Commissioner in June 2008. She was involved with discussions about Malawi's voting system. She was reappointed in 2013. As the law commissioner she served on the Malawi Human Rights Commission. When her contract ended in June 2018 she continued to be employed and some alleged that this was against the constitution.

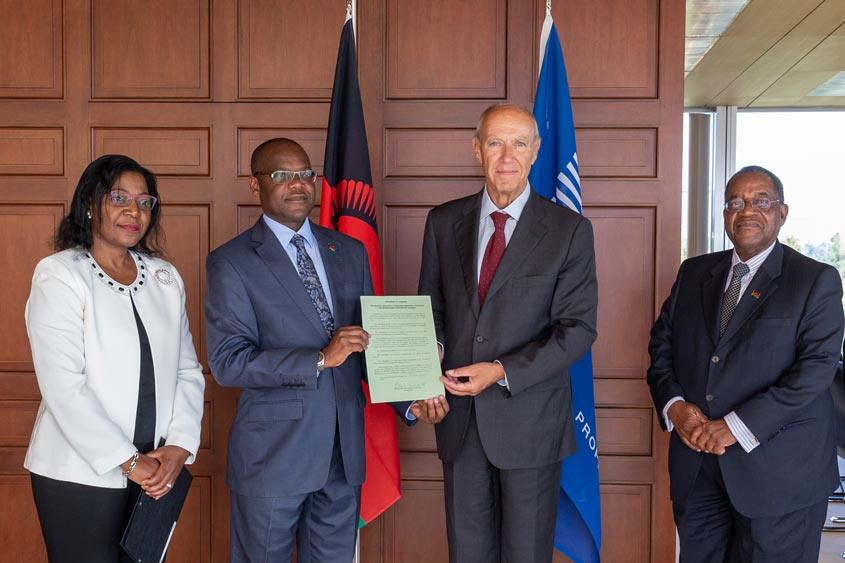
Gertrude Hiwa, Samuel Tembenu, Francis Gurry of WIPO and Ambassador Robert Salama in 2018

President Peter Mutharika had appointed Hiwa as Malawi's Solicitor General. She replaced Jane Chikaya Banda who had been named as the new Principal Secretary at the scandal ridden Minister of Lands.

In 2018, as a result of a finance scandal known as Cashgate, Hiwa formed an Asset Forfeiture Unit (AFU) to seek the return of money. Cashgate had lowered the confidence in the country's partners and the Ministry of Justice and Constitutional Affairs wanted money to be returned. The unit had the power to seize money where if had been obtained illegally. She served as Solicitor General until 2020.

In October 2025 she returned to the role of Solicitor General after the recent election as several new positions were announced. She became the Solicitor General and Secretary for Justice working closely with the Minister of Justice and Constitutional Affairs, Honourable Charles Mhango. In February she and the Minister for Justice met the United Nations co-ordinator, Rebecca Adda-Dontoh. Funding cuts seemed likely and Hiwa and Charles Mhango emphasised the importance of funding, access to justice and the rule of law.

In October 2026 the Judicial Service Commission was formed with members chosen by the President with instructions to remain independent. The commission was made up of Justice Dorothy Kamanga, Ellen Chapita Banda, Edith Wakondiye Chikagwa, Dick Sankhulani, Arthur Chibwana, Shabir Latif SC, Chikosa Banda, Dr Rabiya Hanif and Victor Mhango.
