= Ivy Kamanga =

Malawian judge

- in 2026
- Born: 10 October 1968 (age 57)
- Education: University of Malawi, University of London
- Occupation: judge
- Known for: Supreme Court Judge

Ivy Kamanga (born 10 October 1968) is a Malawian judge. She was one of the five judges who rejected the result of the 2019 Malawian general election. In 2020 she received the Chatham House Prize and she was made a Supreme Court Judge.

== Life ==
Kamanga was born in 1968 and she graduated in law from the University of Malawi in 1992. She began work as a lawyer and she joined the judiciary in 1995. She later took a Masters degree at the University of London in 2009.

In March 2013 she was in hiding, after death threats, after she was appointed to judge a high profile case against Presidential candidate Peter Mutharika and eleven others. Peter Mutharika was accused of treason for trying to take over the country after the death of the previous President - who was his elder brother. Joyce Banda was the legal replacement and Peter Mutharika tried to prevent her from taking office. In July, Kamanga stood down from the case citing a conflict of interest - as her children were friends with the accused's children.

Following a shooting in September 2013, a corruption scandal known as Cashgate was revealed. The entire cabinet were sacked and 70 people were arrested, after it was estimated that over $30 million of government money had been stolen. Money had been paid to businesses in return for bribes. It was Kamanga who sent the first former senior official to jail in 2014. Treza Senzani who had been a tourism civil servant and she had pleaded guilty. She was sentenced to three year with hard labour.

Kamanga became the chair of Malawi's Women Judges Association (WOJAM).

In 2019 she was one of five judges who overturned the result of the 2019 Malawian general election. Justices Healey Potani, Dingiswayo Madise, Michael Tembo, Professor Redson Kapindu and Kamanga had spent months studying reports before deciding that fresh elections were required. They had resisted pressure and they gave their verdict together, after arriving in bulletproof vests accompanied by security. In the following year, the Chatham House Prize was awarded to her and the four other judges. The prize was awarded under the supervision of Gladys Gondwe, Registrar of the Supreme Court, and in Malawi which was a break in tradition as it was normally awarded in London. The five constitutional court judges were applauded in the British parliament. This was the first overturning of a Presidential election in Africa. The Economist made Malawi its "Country of the Year" and Freedom House noted that Malawi was the only country where democracy had improved in 2020. The next election confirmed that the electorate wanted a change of President.

Hilda Macheso, Ivy Kamanga, Tiwa Savage, Esther Bonyonga and Habiba Osman discussing GBV at the Malawi Human Rights Commission in 2026.

In 2020 Kamanga became a Supreme Court Judge after being recommended by President Lazarus Chakwera. President Chakwera promoted a number of judges which included Kamanga, Agnes Patemba and Healey Potani who had been involved in cases that had allowed his re-election.

Kamanga sentenced two men to death in the high court in 2020 after they were found guilty of killing a young albino child, although it was noted that recent death sentences have not been carried out. In the same year she gave a life sentence to Aubrey Kalulu who had given a ten year old girl HIV.

After the 2022 Kenyan Presidential Election there was a dispute about the result. Kamanga was one of five international judges who were asked to observe the loser's unsuccessful petition to the Supreme Court.

In January 2025 she visited a 93 year old women in Ntchisi who had brought up and educated her eleven children. She went on behalf of the Women Judges Association of Malawi as she is a trustee. Alice Catherine "Gogo" Kavwenje had been a widow since 1992 and she had sold agricultural produce to allow her children to gain an education. The Women Judges Association of Malawi wanted to recognise her as a role model for the education of children.

== Personal life ==
Kamanga is married and they have children.
