= Dorothy Kamanga =

Malawian supreme court judge

- Born: Ophrah Dorothy Kamanga; 6 October 1970 (age 56)
- Education: University of Malawi and the University of Cape Town
- Occupation: judge
- Known for: supreme court judge

Dorothy NyaKaunda Kamanga (born 6 October 1970) became a Malawian supreme court judge in 2022.

== Life ==
Kamanga was born in 1970. She entered private practice after she graduated in law from the University of Malawi in 1995 and two years later took a master's degree in the US at Rutgers University in Women Studies.

She obtained her masters (LLM) degree from Cape Town University. She was appointed as Registrar in 2008 and she served until 2012. She became a High Court Judge in 2013. She was appointed with three other judges by President Joyce Banda.

Kamanga was involved in a case about prostitution in Malawi. Eleven sex workers were arrested in 2009 in the southern city of Mwanza. They were taken to a hospital and forcibly given HIV tests. The positive results of the tests were later read out in open court. The sex workers later sued the Malawi government for "damages as compensation for violation of their constitutional rights and trauma suffered as a result of actions of the police and a hospital”. Kamanga ruled that the sex workers should be compensated, and that the actions of the police and health workers were "irrational, unjust, unfair and unreasonable."

Kamanga became a Malawian supreme court judge in 2022. She was one of four new judges appointed by President Chakwera who reassured them of their independence.

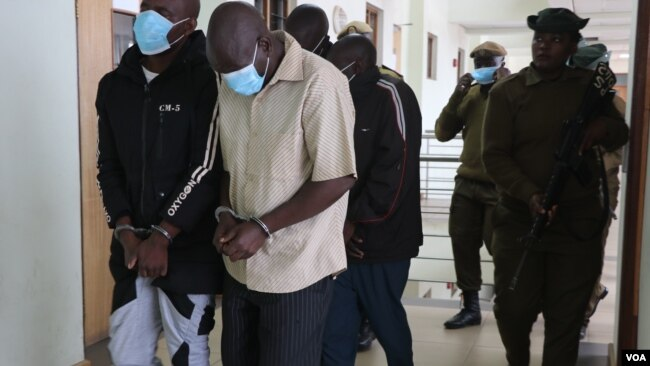
Murderers of an albino man after sentencing by Kamanga in 2022

In June 2022 she sentenced five men to life imprisonment with hard labour for planning and then murdering an albino man in 2018. The case was to have been tried in 2019 by Zione Ntaba but she had recused herself. The five included the man's brother, a member of the Catholic priesthood, a member of the police and a medical worker. People attacking albinos is not an unusual crime in southern Africa and in this case they had extracted human tissue. The government particularly support punishing people associated with crimes against people with albinism.

During the national 2025 elections, Kamanga led the Judicial Commission on Elections. Violence against women during the election was anticipated. The Ministry of Gender's chief gender and development officer, Chimwemwe Kussein said that more laws were being prepared to prevent it.

In October 2026 the Judicial Service Commission was formed with members chosen by the President with instructions to remain independent. The commission was made up of the Solicitor General Gertrude Hiwa, Ellen Chapita Banda, Edith Wakondiye Chikagwa, Dick Sankhulani, Arthur Chibwana, Shabir Latif SC, Chikosa Banda, Dr Rabiya Hanif and Victor Mhango.

== Private life ==
She is married and they have children.
