= Annabel Mtalimanja =

Malawian high court judge

- Born: Annabel Tembo; 26 July 1976 (age 50)
- Education: University of Malawi; University of Melbourne
- Occupation: Judge
- Parent(s): Ruth and John Tembo

Chairperson of the Malawi Electoral Commission
- Incumbent
- Assumed office 21 June 2024
- Preceded by: Chifundo Kachale

Annabel Mtalimanja (born 26 July 1976) is a Malawian High Court judge who has served as the chairperson of the Malawi Electoral Commission since 2024.

== Early life and education ==
Mtalimanja was born in 1976 and her parents were Ruth and John Tembo. Her father was a leading politician and president of the Malawi Congress Party.

She studied law at the University of Malawi and graduated in 1999. She completed her master's degree in law at the University of Melbourne in 2005. She worked at the Ministry of Justice and Constitutional Affairs rising to be Administrator General. In 2013, she was appointed as a High Court Judge.

She became a Fellow of Chartered Institute of Arbitrators in 2021. In the same year, she was part of a five judge panel for a constitutional court led by the new attorney general Thabo Chakaka Nyirenda. It was an unusual case as the Democratic Progressive Party were arguing that an election should be overturned because it had been overseen by members of the Malawi Election Commission who had been illegally appointed. The case was thrown out when it was pointed out that the illegal appointments had been made by the DPP. They were now trying to benefit with this case from their own illegality.

Mtalimanja was a high court judge when she was nominated to lead the Malawi Electoral Commission by the Judicial Service Commission. She was appointed by the President Lazurus Chakwera, and she will serve for four years. She was sworn in as the new chair on 24 June 2024 by the Chief Justice Rizine Robert Mzikamanda at the same time as Limbikani Kamlongera and Phillip Kambulire who were new commissioners.

In October 2024, four of the leading political parties held a press conference where they accused Mtalimanja of favouring the Malawi Congress Party because her father was a leading member of that party. They accused her of bringing in a system to rig the next election. The system in question, Smartmatic, had been chosen some time before Mtalimanja became the new chair of the MEC.

In November 2024, Mtalimanja and the MEC announced the charges made for those wanting to contest an election. The fees were increased but it was noted that candidates who were women or who were disabled would only be charged half of the fees. Mtalimanja announced that these reduced fees would not apply to Presidential candidates but only to other election contests.

== Honours and recognition ==
In October 2025, Mtalimanja was honoured by the Institute of Marketing in Malawi with its “Life Achiever Award” in recognition of her role as Chairperson of the Malawi Electoral Commission during the 2025 general elections.

In December 2025, she was also honoured at the National Product Magazine (NPM) Year End Awards for exemplary service and leadership in managing the 2025 general elections.

Personality of the Year Award 2025 https://malawifreedomnetwork.com/2025/12/16/mec-chairperson-mtalimanja-honoured-with-personality-of-the-year-2025-award/
