= Malawi Electoral Commission =

Malawian national electoral body

Agency overview
- Formed: December 15, 1993; 32 years ago
- Jurisdiction: Malawi
- Status: Independent regulatory agency
- Headquarters: Chisankho House Lilongwe, Malawi
- Agency executives: Annabel Mtalimanja, Chairperson; Andrew Mpesi, Chief Elections Officer
- Website: mec.org.mw

Malawi Electoral Commission (MEC) is an independent electoral management body charged with managing, organising and supervising presidential, parliamentary and local government elections in the Republic of Malawi. The Commission derives its mandate from the Constitution of Malawi and a set of enabling statutes, and is responsible for voter registration, boundary delimitation of constituencies, candidate nomination, voter and civic education, results management and the conduct of referendums and by-elections.

The MEC administers elections in Malawi. Created by the Constitution and the Electoral Commission Act and the Parliamentary and Presidential Elections Act, MEC's mission is to deliver elections in accordance with Malawian law. The Commission is composed of a Chairperson and Commissioners appointed by the President and supported by a permanent secretariat and technical departments.

== History ==
=== Origins ===
The Malawi Electoral Commission is grounded in Malawi’s post-1994 constitutional order and the Constitution (1995), the Parliamentary and Presidential Elections Act, the Local Government Elections Act and the Electoral Commission Act (1998).

=== History ===
- 1994 onward: After the end of one-party rule, Malawi established regular multiparty elections; over time the legal and institutional framework for elections was strengthened.
- 2019 – 2020: The May 2019 tripartite elections were widely contested. In February 2020 Malawi’s courts annulled the 2019 presidential result, citing irregularities and failures in the electoral process that implicated the administration of the election; the Court ordered fresh presidential elections, a decision later upheld on appeal. The annulment and subsequent 2020 fresh election remain among the most significant judicial interventions in Malawi’s electoral history and prompted debates about MEC’s procedures, handling of complaints, and the need for reforms.
- 2020s reforms and technology adoption: In the lead up to later national elections MEC introduced and piloted new technologies and processes (including biometric voter registration pilots, Electoral Management Devices and Results Management System dry runs) and published strategic plans to strengthen the voter register and results management.
- 2023 The MEC moved its headquarters from Blantyre to Lilongwe at the behest of the President Lazarus Chakwera.
- 2025 The new President Mutharika directed that the MEC should return to Blantyre. The MEC went to court to resist the instruction. The President's office said that the reason was to save money, but others feared a political motive.

== Structure and governance ==
The commissioners are nominated by political parties in Malawi who have achieved 10% of the popular vote. The Commission publishes its Commissioners and leadership on its official website. Anastasia Msosa became the MEC's first woman chairperson in 1993

In 2016 the President Peter Mutharika appointed largely new commissioners to serve from 6 June. There had been reports of dubious expense claims. Elvey Mtafu was the only reappointment. New members included Jean Mathanga, Rev Clifford Baloyi from Livingstonia Synod CCAP, Rev Killion Mgawi, Yahaya M’madi, Moffat Banda, former deputy governor of Reserve Bank of Malawi Mary Nkosi and activist Linda Kunje.

Annabel Mtalimanja, was sworn in as chair in June 2024. Two commissioners were sworn in, in June 2024 these were Rev. Phillip P.J. Kambulire and Dr. Limbikani Kamlongera. They joined Caroline Mfune, Richard Chapweteka and Dr Emmanuel Fabiano who had been appointed in 2021 and they were reappointed for another term in June 2025.

== Functions and responsibilities ==
MEC’s principal functions include:

- Voter registration — maintaining and updating the national voter register, including piloting and rolling out biometric or electronic registration systems in cooperation with the National Registration Bureau where required by policy.
- Election administration — planning, staffing, resourcing and managing polling on election day(s), counting and tabulation procedures, and announcing results according to law.
- Results management — developing and operating systems (such as a Results Management System) to capture and transmit results securely and transparently; MEC has conducted RMS dry-runs as part of preparations for national polls.
- Candidate and political party regulation — receiving and vetting nomination papers, enforcing electoral regulations, and ensuring compliance with nomination rules set out in electoral laws.
- Civic and voter education — running programmes to inform voters about registration, polling procedures and electoral rights to improve participation and inclusivity.
- Cooperation with observers and stakeholders — accrediting and liaising with domestic and international observer missions, political parties, civil society and the media to foster transparency.

== Key initiatives and reforms ==
In recent years MEC has pursued institutional reforms and technological updates aimed at strengthening the credibility and efficiency of elections:

- Biometric and electronic voter registration pilots — initiatives and pilots to improve the accuracy of the voter roll and reduce incidents of multiple registration or "ghost" voters, often working with the National Registration Bureau and with international technical partners.
- Electoral Management Devices (EMDs) and Biometric Voter Verification (BVV) — procurement and deployment of portable devices to verify voters and speed verification on polling day. News and MEC releases report procurement and reception of BVV/EMD kits in the mid-2020s.
- Results Management System (RMS) testing — dry-runs of electronic results transmission systems to identify and address technical or logistical weaknesses prior to nationwide use.
- Strategic planning — publication of multi-year strategic plans (for example 2023–2028) setting objectives on voter register credibility, inclusivity, transparency and capacity building.

== Election observation and international engagement ==
MEC engages with international and regional organisations, donor partners, technical assistance providers and domestic observer groups to support election preparations, training and monitoring. The Commission routinely accredits observer missions and holds briefings for stakeholders prior to major polls. Analyses by regional election bodies and policy institutes have also engaged with MEC on reforms and post-election assessments.

== Criticism and controversies ==
MEC has faced criticism at various times from political parties, civil society and the media over issues such as handling of complaints, the credibility of results, transparency of internal procedures, and perceived partisanship. The administration of the May 2019 tripartite elections prompted widespread protests and legal challenges. In February 2020 Malawi’s courts nullified the 2019 presidential result and ordered a fresh election, a judgment that directly criticised aspects of how the electoral process was conducted. The episode stimulated public debate on MEC’s independence, accountability and the need for procedural and technological reforms. MEC’s handling of requests (for example relating to audits or audits of electronic systems) and the pace of technology roll-out have also been points of contention in the public domain. MEC publishes court rulings and its responses where legal challenges occur.

== Notable elections administered ==
- 1994 general election: Malawi’s first multiparty election following the end of one-party rule.
- 2019 Tripartite elections and 2020 fresh presidential election: The May 2019 elections were annulled by the courts in 2020 and a fresh presidential election took place under close domestic and international scrutiny. This sequence remains an important episode in MEC’s institutional history.
