= LGBTQ rights in Malawi =

- Malawi
- Legal status: Illegal since 1891 (as British Central Africa Protectorate)
- Penalty: Up to 14 years imprisonment, with or without corporal punishment for men; Up to 5 years imprisonment for women (rarely enforced, repeal proposed)
- Gender identity: No
- Military: No
- Discrimination protections: Limited protection against hate speech based on sexual preference and gender identity.

Family rights
- Recognition of relationships: No recognition of same-sex unions
- Adoption: No

Lesbian, gay, bisexual, transgender, and queer (LGBTQ) people in Malawi face legal challenges not experienced by non-LGBTQ residents. Both male and female expressions of same-sex sexual activity are illegal within the nation. The Penal Code prohibits "carnal knowledge against the order of nature", attempts to commit "carnal knowledge against the order of nature", and acts of "gross indecency". Homosexuality among men is punishable by up to 14 years in prison in the country, while homosexuality among women is also punishable by up to five years in prison. There are no broad legal protections for LGBTQ rights in the country.

Malawi is a highly conservative country. There is no recognition of same-sex unions in the country. Homosexual activities are also illegal in Malawi. The maximum punishment for homosexuality among men is 14 years of imprisonment in the country, while the maximum punishment for homosexuality among women is five years of imprisonment, though rarely enforced.

In late December 2009, a trans woman, Tiwonge Chimbalanga, and a man, Steven Monjeza, were arrested after holding a traditional "engagement" party. On 18 May 2010, they were found guilty of having committed "unnatural offenses" and "indecent practices between males". On 29 May 2010, then President Bingu wa Mutharika pardoned both individuals.

On 26 June 2021, the country's first ever pride parade was held in Lilongwe, organised by the Nyasa Rainbow Alliance, with the 50+ attendees delivering a petition to the city's officials demanding marriage equality and better access to healthcare for LGBTQ people despite the country's anti-LGBTQ laws.

== History ==
=== Colonial era ===
During colonial times, a Zimbabwean boxer from Nyasaland, named Dhuri, traveled throughout Malawi. Dhuri openly engaged in sexual relations with boys in order to win his boxing matches; his success was attributed to the muthi generated by having sex with other men. Although many knew that he had sex with men, he achieved resounding success.

=== 21st century ===
In July 2005, Reverend Dr. Nick Henderson was elected by the Lake Malawi diocese to serve as its bishop, but conservative members challenged the election. In December, the Anglican Church of Central Africa (ACCA) overturned the election. According to Archbishop Bernard Malango, who led the ACCA, "He has actively demonstrated that he was not of sound faith—that's what the Court of Confirmation decided." The bishops concluded that Henderson's involvement with the Modern Church, which supported LGBTQ rights, made him "unsuitable". A four-year struggle by laity and priests to overturn the ACCA's decision then ensued. The matter was eventually settled when Henderson asked his supporters to agree to the election of the Venerable Francis Kaulanda as bishop. Kaulanda had been one of Henderson's sabbatical study priests.

In September 2009, Mary Shawa, secretary for nutrition, HIV, and AIDS in the president's office, argued that Malawi must give gay people access to HIV and AIDS services. She said, "There is a need to incorporate a human rights approach in the delivery of HIV and AIDS services to such risk groups like men who have sexual intercourse with men if we have to fight AIDS."

In February 2010, Peter Sawali was arrested for putting up posters on a busy road in Blantyre that read "Gay rights are human rights". He was charged with conduct likely to cause a breach of the peace. He was subsequently convicted and sentenced to clean the premises of Blantyre Magistrates Court for 60 days.

In April 2010, President Bingu wa Mutharika condemned acts of homosexuality. He said, "Malawians are even aping cultures they do not understand. They are saying a man should marry a fellow man. This is evil and bad before the eyes of God. There are certain things we Malawians just do not do."

In July 2011, Undule Mwakasungula, the chairperson of the Human Rights Consultative Committee, and Gift Trapence, executive director of the Centre for Development of People, reportedly went into hiding after being threatened with arrest for treason. President Mutharika was quoted as saying, "I will ... hunt you in your homes. You will not hide, I will smoke you out, muziwanso. You should go back to your fathers and mothers from the West, who have sent you." Two months earlier, George Chaponda, Malawi's Justice and Constitutional Affairs Minister, claimed that recent withdrawals of foreign aid by various countries were the fault of Mwakasungula and Trapence. He said, "The country is suffering because of the conduct of some leaders of the civil society. Those people are not patriotic. Some donors have withdrawn their aid and everybody is suffering."

The U.S. Department of State's 2011 human rights report found that,

An environment conducive to discrimination based on sexual orientation was created and maintained by senior government officials. On World Tourism Day in September [2011], the tourism minister [Daniel Liwimbi] said it was not proper for citizens to engage in same-sex sexual activity as "very un-Malawian." The mistaken notion that western donor countries were withholding financial aid unless the country permits same sex marriages enhanced a homophobic environment. In October[,] the Malawi Council of Churches declared that the country needed aid, and millions of innocent citizens should not be penalized because same-sex sexual activity was outlawed.

In February 2014, the Muslim Association of Malawi (MAM) called for gay people to be condemned to death, saying "the offenders need to be handed death penalty as a way of making sure that the issue is curbed".

In January 2016, spokesperson for the People's Party Ken Msonda posted on Facebook several statements that Malawian gays "are worse than dogs", that gays and lesbians are "sons and daughters of the devil" and that they should be killed. The Malawi Law Society criticised these statements and filed charges against Msonda in court, while also asking police and the Malawi Human Rights Commission to investigate Msonda's statements as hate speech. The case against Msonda got under way, pushed by the law society, the Centre for Human Rights and Rehabilitation (CHRR) and LGBTQ rights advocates at the Centre for Peoples Development (CEDEP). Several other civil society organizations expressed interest in joining the case, including Youth and Children Rights Shield (YOCRIS), the Forum for National Development (FND), and the Counseling for the Adolescent Youth Organization (CAYO). However, the case against Msonda was taken over and then discontinued by Kachale, Malawi's director of public prosecution, who intervened on 21 January.

In January 2016, a gay Malawian man, Eric Sambisa, from Blantyre in southern Malawi. acknowledged to an interviewer that he is gay and said that he is tired of being treated as a second-class citizen by what he called "the homophobic Malawian government and homophobic Malawian society" by saying "Kill us or give us our rights". He was briefly detained by police after his story was published and went briefly into hiding during that time.

An October 2018 report by Human Rights Watch found that members of the LGBTQ community are vulnerable to arbitrary arrest, physical violence and discrimination. The report recommends that same-sex consensual activity should be decriminalised in order to ensure that members of the LGBTQ community are better protected.

In 2021 the country's first-ever Pride parade was held in Lilongwe with about 50 people taking part.

== Legality of same-sex sexual activity ==
=== Statutes ===
The Malawi Penal Code provides:

Any female person who, whether in public or private, commits any act of gross indecency with another female person, or procures another female person to commit any act of gross indecency with her, or attempts to procure the commission of any such act by any female person with herself or with another female person, whether in public or private, shall be guilty of an offence and shall be liable to imprisonment for five years.

— Section 137A: Indecent practices between females

Any person who—

- (a) has carnal knowledge of any person against the order of nature; or ...
- (c) permits a male person to have carnal knowledge of him or her against the order of nature,

shall be guilty of a felony and shall be liable to imprisonment for fourteen years, with or without corporal punishment.

— Section 153. Unnatural offences

Any person who attempts to commit any of the offences specified in the last preceding section shall be guilty of a felony and shall be liable to imprisonment for seven years, with or without corporal punishment.

— Section 154: Attempt to commit unnatural offences

Any male person who, whether in public or private, commits any act of gross indecency with another male person, or procures another male person to commit any act of gross indecency with him, or attempts to procure the commission of any such act by any male person with himself or with another male person, whether in public or private, shall be guilty of a felony and shall be liable to imprisonment for five years, with or without corporal punishment [under Section 28 of the Penal Code].

— Section 156: Indecent practices between males

The news media reported in December 2011 that these statutes had been sent to the Malawi Law Commission (MLC) for review, quoting Ephraim Chiume, Malawi's justice minister. However, a high-level delegation of legal experts appointed by the International Bar Association's Human Rights Institute found in January 2012 that the MLC had not, in fact, been asked specifically to review these statutes.

On 18 May 2012, President Joyce Banda announced her intention to repeal the laws criminalizing same-sex sexual activity. On 5 November, the Malawian government suspended all laws that criminalized homosexuality. Attorney General and Minister of Justice Ralph Kasambara ordered police not to arrest LGBTQ individuals, pending a review from the National Assembly. Three days later, he reversed himself, saying, "There was no such announcement and there was no discussion on same-sex marriage." The Malawi Law Society argued that it was unconstitutional for ministers to arbitrarily suspend any law and would set a dangerous precedent for the future. Religious leaders were strongly against the suspension.

In November 2013, the Malawi High Court announced its intention to review the constitutionality of the law by accepting an appeal. The focus of the appeal is the case of three prisoners Amon Champyuni, Mathews Bello and Musa Chiwisi, who were convicted in 2011 and are serving sentences ranging from 10 to 14 years for practicing homosexuality. In January 2014, the court's deliberations on the issue were delayed pending a determination by the Supreme Court on whether the High Court can proceed to review an issue of constitutionality. As of 2019, there have been no ruling.

In September 2016, President Peter Mutharika said that he "wants gay rights protected" and proposed a referendum on decriminalising homosexuality and legalising same-sex marriage. However, in October 2015, a State House spokesperson has said the president's comments are his own personal opinion on the subject and not a policy.

On 9 February 2016, the High Court in Mzuzu has ordered the Malawi Police Service, the Director of Public Prosecutions to continue arresting and prosecuting gays and lesbians who commit homosexual offences in Malawi. High Court Judge Dingiswayo Madise granted an injunction requested by anti-gay pastors seeking an end to the government's moratorium on arrests under the country's anti-homosexuality law during court deliberations on that law's constitutionality. The prosecutions will continue pending a judicial review of the decisions, conduct and abdication of legal and constitutional duty by the Minister of Justice and Constitutional Affairs, the Director of Public Prosecutions and the Malawi Police Service.

=== Malawi Constitution ===
The Malawi Constitution does not specifically prohibit discrimination on the grounds of sexual orientation. Human rights lawyer Chrispine Sibande, however, argued in 2010 that discrimination is prohibited under Section 20 of the constitution, which provides that "all persons are, under any law, guaranteed equal and effective protection against discrimination on grounds of race, colour, sex, language, religion, political or other opinion, nationality, ethnic or social origin, disability, property, birth or other status." There has no been no official legal ruling to this effect.

== Recognition of same-sex unions ==
On 17 April 2015, the Marriage, Divorce and Family Relations Law came into force and banned all same-sex marriages and unions. While the law was praised for raising the minimum age of heterosexual marriages from 16 to 18, it was at the same time condemned for the exclusion of homosexual couples and for its language stating that one's gender is assigned at birth. The new law does not allow people who have undergone gender reassignment surgery to marry someone of that person's prior gender and also draws comparisons of gay sex to rape and sexual harassment.

== Discrimination protections ==
There is no broad legal protection against discrimination based on sexual orientation or gender identity. However, since 2019, there is limited protection against hate speech based on gender identity and sexual preference.

The Communications (Broadcasting) Regulations 2019, defines "hate messages" as a "speech intended to degrade, intimidate or incite violence or prejudicial action against a person or group of people base on their race, gender, ethnicity, nationality, religion, gender identity, disability, language ability, moral or policital views, socio-economic class, occupation or physical appearance, mental capacity and any other distinction that might be considered by some as a libility." In addition:

- Section 22 (1-d) states that a licensee shall not broadcast content that "is likely to incite or perpetuate hatred or vilify any person or section of the society on account of race, ethnicity, nationality, gender, sexual preference, age, disability, religion, culture or any other status of that person or section of the society."
- Section 30(2-d) states a licensee, or its employee, shall not broadcast live any matter which "is likely to incite or perpetuate hatred or vilify any person or section of the society on account of race, ethnicity, nationality, gender, sexual preference, age, disability, religion, culture or any other status of that person or section of the society."

== Living conditions ==
In 2014, an HIV study showed that Malawi has a population of 1.84% Men who have Sex with Men (MSM), or 38,784 people. The population was seen as having increased due to decriminalization of homosexuality, the influence of LGBTQ rights groups, and media awareness about homosexuality.

Cohabitation, socializing at LGBTQ nightclubs, and socializing at universities is common for homosexual Malawians. Many homosexuals also experience embarrassment, and physical and verbal abuse at local universities for their sexualities.

=== Prisons ===
In prisons, non-consensual sex (intercrural or anal) and prostitution is common between men, due to overcrowded environments, physiological needs, lack of food, age mixing, and sex-trading. Often homosexuality is associated with violence, coercion, corruption, and power struggles. Tent structures called makatani, rest houses, are used by inmates for a private place to have sex. Sex is also often traded for cigarettes, Indian hemp (chamba), food, or protection. Prostitution, called "short time", is often conducted by young effeminate boys, who may dress and accessorize like women. Some consensual homosexual relationships also exist in Malawian prisons.

=== Mining industry ===
In both Malawian and Zimbabwean mines, men have been known to practice mutual masturbation as well as nkotshane relationships. In Zimbabwean mines, men who engaged in intercrural sex were seen as possessing muthi, and their semen was used in muthi medicine.

=== Criminal conviction and subsequent pardon of Malawian couple ===
In late December 2009, a trans woman, Tiwonge Chimbalanga, and a man, Steven Monjeza, were arrested after holding a traditional "chinkhoswe" (engagement ceremony) and then jailed separately in Blantyre. Magistrate Nyakwawa Usiwausiwa subsequently denied bail, allegedly for their own protection. "The public out there is angry with them."

In a ruling made public on 22 February 2010, High Court Chief Justice Lovemore G. Munlo denied the defendants' motion for a Constitutional Court to be convened to rule on the constitutionality of Sections 153 and 156 of the Penal Code. He wrote, "From the totality of the documents that are before me, I have come to the conclusion that the criminal proceedings that are before the Chief Resident Magistrate Court do not expressly and substantially relate to or concern the interpretation or application of the Constitution."

On 18 May 2010, the defendants were found guilty of having committed "unnatural offenses" and "indecent practices between males" under the Malawi Penal Code. Magistrate Usiwausiwa imposed the maximum penalty of 14 years in prison with hard labour. He said, "I will give you a scaring sentence so that the public be protected from people like you so that we are not tempted to emulate this horrendous example. We are sitting here to represent the Malawi society, which I do not believe is ready at this point in time to see its sons getting married to other sons or conducting engagement ceremonies."

The trial and sentences were condemned by regional human rights organizations including AIDS and Rights Alliance for Southern Africa, the Southern Africa Litigation Centre, the Centre for the Development of People, and the Centre for Human Rights and Rehabilitation. In addition, international human rights organizations such as Amnesty International and the International Gay and Lesbian Human Rights Commission reacted with condemnation, as did donor entities and governments such as the United States, the United Kingdom, Germany, Norway, the African Development Bank, the European Union, and the World Bank.

However, the Malawi Council of Churches (a grouping of up to 22 Protestant churches) advised the Malawi government to maintain the laws that criminalize same-sex sexual acts and asked international organizations to "respect Malawi's cultural and religious values and refrain from using aid as a means of forcing the country to legalise sinful acts like homosexuality in the name of human rights".

The International Women's Health Coalition and Gender Dynamix identified the imprisonment of Chimbalanga, in particular, as an issue of transphobia. The groups criticized international reporting of the trial and the sentencing of Chimbalanga because most media outlets did not report Chimbalanga's gender identity in their coverage of the issue of marriage equality for same-sex couples.

On 29 May 2010, then President Bingu wa Mutharika pardoned both individuals during a visit by Ban Ki-moon, the United Nations Secretary-General.

A high-level delegation of legal experts appointed by the International Bar Association's Human Rights Institute conducted a fact-finding mission in Malawi in January 2012. Some government representatives told the delegation that Chimbalanga and Monjeza were not, in fact, gay and had been funded by international organizations. The delegation, however, was unable to corroborate this assertion.

Chimbalanga eventually sought and was granted refugee status in South Africa. Monjeza married another woman and then left her, accusing her of trying to access his money. He became a petty criminal, spent time in jail and was reported to have died of unknown causes in July 2012.

=== Subsequent arrests ===
On 7 December 2015, two men Cuthbert Kulemela, 19, and Kelvin Gonani, 39 were arrested while having sex for alleged homosexual activity. However, on 15 December 2015, the government of Malawi announced that charges have been dropped against them. In a statement, Justice Minister Samuel Tembenu reaffirmed Malawi's moratorium on arrests and prosecutions for alleged violations of the country's anti-gay law.

In April 2018, police arrested a man named Limbane Sibande in Mzuzu on suspicion of being gay and charged him with indecency. The arrest was reportedly made for an alleged violation of Section 156 of the Penal Code (indecent practices between males) rather than under the country's main anti-gay law, Section 153 (carnal knowledge of any person against the order of nature).

== International pressure ==
=== Reports and recommendations under the International Covenant on Civil and Political Rights ===
==== Observations of the United Nations Human Rights Committee ====
Malawi became a party to the International Covenant on Civil and Political Rights on 22 December 1993. Under Article 40 of the Covenant, Malawi was required to submit its initial report by 21 March 1995. Malawi failed to honour its reporting obligations for more than 17 years, despite numerous reminders. The United Nations Human Rights Committee (UNHRC) in June 2012 made "provisional concluding observations" in the absence of Malawi's report.

The Committee is concerned about allegations regarding reported cases of violence and discrimination against people engaging in same-sex relationships in ...[Malawi], as well as allegations of incitement to violence against them by some public officials and authorities, despite section 20 of the Constitution, which guarantees equality of persons and prohibits discrimination. The Committee is also concerned about sections 153 and 156 of the Penal Code, which criminalize homosexuality, and about the new amendment to the Penal Code, section 137A, which also criminalizes same-sex relationships between women (arts. 2, 3 and 26). [Malawi] ... should amend its Penal Code to decriminalize homosexuality between adults of both sexes, and conduct awareness-raising campaigns to educate the population on this issue. [Malawi] ... should also take appropriate steps to protect persons engaged in same-sex consensual relationships against discrimination and violence on the basis of their sexual orientation, and ensure that public officials and public authorities refrain from using language that may encourage hatred and violence against them. In this regard, [Malawi] ... should prosecute persons allegedly responsible for such acts of discrimination and violence, and punish those who are convicted.

In an oral response provided to the UNHRC, the Malawi delegation said,

The Government of Malawi has referred to the Law Commission for review of all legislation referred to above. The review process will be thorough and consultative. The Malawi Law Commission is an independent body and its recommendations are seriously considered by the Government of Malawi.

==== Malawi's initial report ====
In its long-overdue initial report to the UNHRC dated 13 July 2012, Malawi stated,

In terms of discrimination based on sexual orientation, the vast majority of society has not accepted homosexuality and homosexuality is not practiced in the open. It is therefore very unlikely that cases of discrimination and violence based on sexual orientation would be reported. ... The State has prosecuted individuals ... for engaging in homosexual acts. For example, in the highly publicized case of the Republic v. Tiwonge Chimbalanga and Steven Monjeza (Criminal Case number 359 of 2009 Magistrates Court) two male individuals were tried and convicted of the offence of indecent practices between males, however they were later pardoned and released. ... Despite recent debate over homosexuality in Malawi, the general consensus still remains, that is, the majority of Malawians do not support homosexuality. In order to take the minority views into account, the relevant laws that criminalize such practices have since been referred to the Law Commission for a comprehensive review.

=== 2010–2011 Universal Periodic Review ===
The United Nations Human Rights Council (UNHRC) in March 2011 completed a Universal Periodic Review of the human rights situation in Malawi.

==== Recommendations of the UPR ====
During the review, Sweden,

expressed concerns at the existing discrimination based on sexual orientation. Sweden recalled Malawi's ratification of the International Covenant on Civil and Political Rights as well as the basic principle of non-discrimination, which also underpinned the African Charter on Human and Peoples' Rights and the Universal Declaration of Human Rights.

Sweden recommended that Malawi,

Fulfill its obligations under international human rights law and review its national legislation, as a matter of urgency, to decriminalize same-sex relationships and prohibit discrimination on any grounds, including sexual orientation.

Mexico recommended that Malawi,

Completely overhaul the legal system to ensure the compliance of the Constitution and all other domestic legislation with international human rights obligations and standards and, in this regard, amend and/or derogate all legal provisions, including customary law, which result in discrimination, especially on the basis of sexual orientation.

France recommended that Malawi,

Put in place a moratorium on convictions for same-sex relationships and, over time, decriminalize homosexuality in order to fully apply the principle of equality and non-discrimination among all persons.

Canada, Germany, Australia, the United Kingdom, Italy, Austria, Ireland, and Luxembourg generally recommended that Malawi reform its Penal Code to end discrimination, hostility, and violence against people based on their sexual orientation or gender identity.

The United States,

commended Malawi for progress in aligning its national legislation with some international human rights conventions, but was concerned by the criminalization of homosexual activity. It noted that it viewed the decriminalization of homosexuality as integral to the continued protection of universal human rights in Malawi, and crucial to the urgent need to fight the spread of HIV/AIDS.

The United States recommended that Malawi, "Decriminalize homosexual activity."

Spain recommended that Malawi,

Derogate legislation that criminalizes same-sex activities between consenting adults and adopt measures to combat incitement to hatred for reasons of sexual orientation or gender identity, and allow the registration of [non-governmental organizations] ... that defend matters of sexual orientation and gender identity without discrimination.

Switzerland recommended that Malawi,

Review domestic legislation with a view to decriminalizing homosexual relations and prohibiting all forms of discrimination, in compliance with Malawi's international commitments. Release immediately and unconditionally all persons currently deprived of their liberty only for this reason.

Norway recommended that Malawi,

On the question of the rights of sexual minorities, review laws in order to ensure that legislation is brought into line with international human rights norms.

==== Malawi's response ====
Malawi did not support any of the preceding recommendations.

Malawi stated that "it had no plans to legalize homosexuality. The wishes of the people of Malawi in this regard should be respected. It noted that there was no international consensus on gay rights or on the right of gay persons to marry. Malawi should not be unduly singled out and unnecessarily pressured to legalize homosexuality. Malawi recalled that a resolution on gay rights considered for adoption by the United Nations in 2008 had been defeated."

Malawi stated that "there was no homophobia or incitement against gay people. The law simply outlawed unnatural acts, which could even be committed in a sexual relationship between a man and a woman."

Regarding gay marriage, Malawi said "it was a process, even in countries that had made recommendations in that regard. Malawi's Law Commission was working on laws that needed to be updated." Also, "Malawi emphasized that it had no law criminalizing such marriage, but a law proscribing unnatural offences. It noted Malawi's historical background. Malawi had been a British protectorate, and when it had gained its independence, it had adopted all the laws then in force, including that regarding unnatural acts. In 1994, Malawi had adopted a new Constitution, under which a Law Commission had been established that was mandated with the task of reviewing all laws to ensure that they were consistent with the Constitution."

On 4 January 2017, thousands of people across the country's 28 districts participated in protests led by the Episcopal Conference of Malawi and the Evangelical Association of Malawi against legalizing homosexuality as well as abortion.

== Summary table ==
| Same-sex sexual activity legal | No (Penalty: Up to 14 years imprisonment for men, up to 5 years imprisonment for women; rarely enforced, repeal proposed) |
| Equal age of consent | No |
| Anti-discrimination laws in employment only | No |
| Anti-discrimination laws in the provision of goods and services | No |
| Anti-discrimination laws in all other areas (Incl. indirect discrimination, hate speech) | No / Yes (hate speech ban based on gender identity and sexual preference, only in broadcasting) |
| Same-sex marriages | No |
| Recognition of same-sex couples | No |
| Step-child adoption by same-sex couples | No |
| Joint adoption by same-sex couples | No |
| Gays and lesbians allowed to serve openly in the military | No |
| Right to change legal gender | No |
| Access to IVF for lesbians | No |
| Commercial surrogacy for gay male couples | No |
| MSMs allowed to donate blood | No |

== See also ==
- Human rights in Malawi
- LGBTQ rights in Africa
