= Gertrude Rubadiri =

Malawian teacher and freedom fighter (1927–2021)

- Born: Gertrude Mabel Olive Uzanda; 8 March 1927
- Died: 28 January 2021 (aged 93)
- Occupation: Teacher
- Spouse: David Rubadiri (m. 1957; died 2018)
- Children: 5
- Relatives: Victoria Rubadiri, granddaughter

Gertrude Mabel Olive Rubadiri (née Uzanda, 8 March 1927 – 28 January 2021) was a Malawian teacher who was active in the nationalist movement in Nyasaland. She was detained with her husband, the poet and diplomat David Rubadiri, during the Nyasaland State of Emergency of 1959. In 2014 she was among twenty figures honoured in the Living Legends project at the Cultural and Museum Centre Karonga.

== Early life and education ==
Gertrude Uzanda was born on 8 March 1927 at Livingstonia in northern Nyasaland, the eldest of three children. She was educated in Southern Rhodesia and South Africa, attending Hope Fountain and Marianhill, before studying at the University of Fort Hare, where she graduated with a degree in home economics and qualified as a teacher. Robert Mugabe was a former classmate of hers at Fort Hare and the Malawian ten students were Orton Chirwa, Wellington Manoah Chirwa and Harry Bwanausi, Walter Dyson Chona, Edward D. Mwasi, Henry Blasius Masauko Chipembere, Moir Chisuse, Vincent Gondwe and Vida Mungwira. Vida was the first Malawian woman to become a medical doctor. They were not in a white university but their syllabuses and exams were from Rhodes University.

== Marriage and nationalist activity ==
She married James David Rubadiri on 14 September 1957; the couple taught together at Dedza Secondary School. Their son Kwame Rubadiri was born in Dedza on 11 June 1958. Together, they had five children: sons Kwame, Sekou, Tengo and Lunga and daughter Lindiwe. David Rubadiri later took a second wife, Ugandan nurse Janet.

Both Rubadiris were active in the Nyasaland African Congress and were imprisoned during the independence struggle; the two were arrested during Operation Sunrise. In her autobiography, the lawyer and activist Vera Chirwa, who describes Gertrude Rubadiri as her cousin, recalls encountering the couple under arrest at Chileka Airport at the start of the 1959 state of emergency, before the detainees were flown to Southern Rhodesia.

== Career ==
Rubadiri worked as a secondary school teacher. She accompanied her husband through his diplomatic and academic career, which included periods in exile. Besides teaching at Dedza Secondary School, she also taught at Wandegeya Primary School in Kampala, Uganda, Nairobi's Loreto Convent Valley Road Primary School and Gaborone Secondary School in Gaborone, Botswana.

In later life, the couple lived on a smallholding in Malawi. Her husband died on 15 September 2018, a day after their sixty-first wedding anniversary.

== Recognition ==
In November 2014, Rubadiri was one of twenty people honoured as "living legends" at the Cultural and Museum Centre Karonga, alongside her husband and the politician Rose Chibambo. Rubadiri died on 28 January 2021, at the age of 93.

Her daughter, Lindiwe Rubadiri-Mujugira, and her granddaughter, the broadcaster Victoria Rubadiri, published an account of Rubadiri's life in the Society of Malawi Journal in 2021.
