= Orton Chirwa =

Malawian politician (1919–1992)

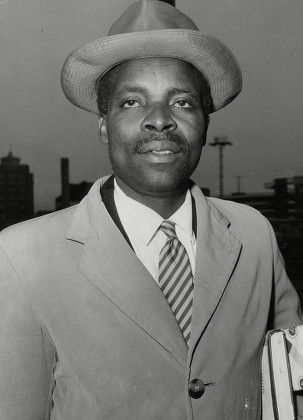
- Orton Chirwa

1st Malawi Congress Party President and Founder
- In office 30 September 1959 – April 1960
- Succeeded by: Dr. Hastings Banda

1st Malawi-born Minister of Justice and Attorney General
- In office 1964 till Cabinet Crisis of 1964
- Preceded by: Alan Munro
- Succeeded by: Bryan Clieve Roberts

Personal details
- Born: Orton Edgar Ching'oli Chirwa; 30 January 1919
- Died: 20 October 1992 (aged 73) Zomba prison, Malawi
- Spouse: Vera Chirwa
- Occupation: Lawyer, politician
- Known for: First Malawi black barrister, Minister of Justice, 1981–92 imprisonment

Orton Chirwa (30 January 1919 – 20 October 1992) was a lawyer and political leader in colonial Nyasaland and after independence became Malawi's Minister of Justice and Attorney General. After a dispute with Malawi's autocratic President Hastings Kamuzu Banda, he and his wife Vera were exiled. After being kidnapped abroad they were tried in Malawi on charges of treason and sentenced to death. Amnesty International named the couple prisoners of conscience. After spending nearly eleven years on death row in Malawi, Orton Chirwa died in prison on 20 October 1992.

== Early life ==
The early life of Orton Edgar Ching'oli Chirwa is sparsely documented. He was educated at Fort Hare University in South Africa that served only black students, but all of their exams were from Rhodes University. There were ten students from what is now Malawi. These were Vida Mungwira, Wellington Manoah Chirwa, Harry Bwanausi, Walter Dyson Chona, Edward D. Mwasi, Henry Blasius Masauko Chipembere, Moir Chisuse, Vincent Gondwe and Gertrude Rubadiri. They were not in a white university but their syllabuses were from Rhodes University.

In 1951 Chriwa wrote a long memorandum arguing against federation with Southern Rhodesia which was presented to Colonial Secretary James Griffiths and Commonwealth Relations Secretary Patrick Gordon-Walker during their visit to Nyasaland, in August and September 1951, to gauge Africans' sentiments on this subject. During the Lancaster House Conference convened in 1952 to discuss federation, wearing academic robes he "captivated crowds with his carefully argued attacks on the federal plan at village markets and meeting halls." He had by this time already been in correspondence for four years with Hastings Banda, who was to become the president of the country after independence. Despite widespread opposition, Nyasaland was integrated into the Federation of Rhodesia and Nyasaland in 1953. In 1954, Chirwa joined with Charles Matinga and Andrew Mponda in forming the short-lived Nyasaland Progressive Association, dedicated to working within the new reality of the federation. During 1954 - 1956, approximately, Chirwa was an instructor at Domasi Teacher Training College, where, along with David Rubadiri and Alec Nyasulu, he reportedly was active in infusing his students with nationalist political consciousness.

== Political life ==
In 1959, the British Colonial Government banned the Nyasaland African Congress (NAC) and arrested most of the political party's leaders, including Orton Chirwa and Banda in a mass swoop known as Operation Sunrise. Orton Chirwa was detained in Khami Jail near Bulawayo in Southern Rhodesia for a short time before, on 1 August 1959, being released. He became the first president of the Malawi Congress Party(MCP), a successor-party to the NAC formed on 30 September 1959. There was some opposition to this appointment, notably from Kanyama Chiume, who considered him tainted by his previous association with the Federation-tolerant Nyasaland Progressive Association. It has been suggested that the British government might have harbored hopes of Chirwa taking the leadership reins as a moderate nationalist, but it soon became clear that he was merely "keeping the seat warm" for Banda.

In November 1959 when he visited Iain Macleod, the Colonial Secretary in the Conservative government under Harold Macmillan, he made clear that MCP would only negotiate independence with Banda as its head. Three days after Banda was released from Gwelo Prison on 2 April 1960, Orton Chirwa together with other NAC leaders invited him to stand for President of the MCP. Chirwa stood down and Dr. Banda took over the leadership of the Malawi Congress Party which subsequently led Malawi to independence in 1964.

Harold Macmillan visited Nyasaland in 1960, and Chirwa organized a protest on 25 January in Blantyre which was noted in the British newspapers for its rowdiness. During the run-up to elections in 1962 and again in 1963, he was vocal in his condemnation of attempts by other Africans to form political parties in opposition to the MCP, with himself and David Rubadira by this time openly advocating totalitarian rule by the MCP.

Orton Chirwa was named Parliamentary Secretary in the Ministry of Justice, (a position slightly short of Minister) in Dr. Banda's interim administration which took office in 1962. In the run-up to the 1964 National Assembly elections, he was active in promoting the use of "traditional courts" as an alternative to the existing judiciary, a controversial move in that these courts were subject to significant political influence, and was heavily criticised by the Chief Justice for this and by the Governor, Glyn Jones, for failing to investigate and prosecute hundreds of cases of politically motivated intimidation, in the form of assaults, murders, arson and crop destruction, as well as cases of intimation against Jehovah's Witnesses. In 1963, he threatened to bring charges against the Nyasaland Times under the Sedition Act because of that newspaper's reporting on opposition political parties.

He became independent Malawi's Minister of Justice and Attorney General in 1964, but resigned after a short time along with other ministers in the Cabinet Crisis of 1964. Attempting a reconciliation with Banda in the aftermath, he was badly beaten up by Banda's bodyguard after a meeting with Banda at Government House. On 23 October 1964, sub-Chief Timbiri from Chirwa's Nkahata Bay constituency, was murdered in Zomba. Police said they had evidence Chirwa was involved. He fled to Dar es Salaam early in November, together with his wife, Vera Chirwa.

=== Exile and capture ===
Forced by Banda's authoritarian policies to leave Malawi, the Chirwas settled in Tanzania where Orton taught and practised law. He formed a new political party, the Malawi Freedom Movement, which appears to have had little active support inside Malawi, a one-party state with Banda its president for life. During a visit to Zambia with their youngest son, Fumbani, the Chirwas were kidnapped and arrested on Christmas Eve 1981 in eastern Zambia by Malawi security forces and taken back to Malawi on charges of high treason, although it was alleged they were trying to enter Malawi.

=== Trial ===
Ironically, the Chirwas were tried by a "traditional" court of the kind whose introduction Orton himself had championed in 1962. Both lawyers, they conducted their own defence as traditional courts did not allow defence lawyers in a trial lasting two months in front of judges appointed by Dr. Banda. This case demonstrated the deficiencies in the system. At the end of their appeal in 1983, the minority of the appellate judges that had legal training opposed the guilty verdict, but it was over-ruled by the majority composed of traditional chiefs.

At their trial, the Chirwas claimed that they had been abducted from Zambia in December 1981. This, and the charge that they had conspired to overthrow the government outside Malawi, should have meant that the traditional courts had no jurisdiction. The case could still have been heard in Malawi's High Court, but that court required proof of guilt beyond reasonable doubt. The treason case heard against the Chirwas by the Southern Region Traditional Court in 1983 was based on handwritten documents said to have been found on them when arrested, and a police officer's "expert" testimony that they were indeed in Orton Chirwa's handwriting. An unsigned statement said to have been made by Orton Chirwa, but repudiated by him, and a transcript said to have been made of a taped interview he had given were also admitted as evidence. The Chirwas were not allowed to call witnesses from outside Malawi and were both sentenced to death and taken to the central prison in Zomba.

On the Chirwas' appeal to the National Traditional Court of Appeal, the refusal of the lower court to allow defence witnesses, its admission of the unsigned statement and its acceptance of a police officer as an expert witness were all criticised, and minority of the judges did not accept that creating unpublished handwritten documents amounted to treason. However the appeal court came to the startling conclusion that, even if the Traditional courts had no jurisdiction in law, they had a traditional right to try the Chirwas, and that (despite the deficiencies in the lower court's handling of the case), their decision was correct and should stand. The death sentences were commuted, but Orton Chirwa later died in prison. Vera Chirwa was released from prison in 1993 after over 11 years in prison, mostly in solitary confinement.

=== Imprisonment and death ===
In Zomba Prison Orton Chirwa was held in solitary confinement and not allowed any outside contact. For eight years he was not even permitted to see his wife Vera who was being held in the same prison. In 1990, Amnesty International launched an investigation into their fate and named the couple prisoners of conscience. In autumn 1992, when a delegation of British legal experts was allowed to visit Orton and Vera at the prison, the Chirwas were able to meet again for the first time in 8 years. According to the British lawyers, at the time of the meeting he was partially deaf and blind due to untreated cataracts. Orton died in his cell 3 weeks later at the age of 73.

=== Family ===
Nkhondo Chirwa, second son of Orton and Vera, died unexpectedly on 18 October 2016 in Kendal, Cumbria, England, hometown for him and his children for many years. He is buried in Parkside cemetery Kendal. At his funeral tributes were paid to Amnesty International for their efforts on behalf of the Chirwa family.
