= Rubadiri =

Rubadiri is a surname. Notable people with the surname include:

- David Rubadiri (1930–2018), Malawian diplomat
- Victoria Rubadiri (born 1989), Kenyan journalist
