= Victoria Rubadiri =

Kenyan journalist

- Born: Victoria Rubadiri; 28 January 1987 (age 39)
- Education: Temple University
- Occupation: Journalist
- Employer: CNN
- Title: News Presenter
- Father: Kwame Rubadiri
- Relatives: David Rubadiri, grandfather Gertrude Rubadiri, grandmother
- Awards: BBC World News Komla Dumor Award

Victoria Rubadiri (born 28 January 1987) is a Kenyan award-winning journalist and correspondent with CNN International in Kenya. In 2020, she won the 2020 BBC World News Komla Dumor Award, becoming the second Kenyan recipient of the honor.

== Early life and education ==
Rubadiri was born in Kenya and spent part of her childhood with her father Kwame Rubadiri and mother Emmy in the United States. She began early education at Nairobi Pentecostal Academy and Rusinga School, before relocating to New Jersey at the age of 10. She later attended Atlantic City High School.

Rubadiri earned a bachelor's degree in broadcast journalism in 2009, from Temple University in Philadelphia, Pennsylvania. Prior to becoming a television anchor, she worked as a radio presenter at Capital FM in Nairobi.

Rubadiri is the granddaughter of the deceased Malawian poet and diplomat David Rubadiri and his wife teacher and independence activist Gertrude Rubadiri. In 2021 Rubadiri and her aunt Lindiwe Rubadiri-Mujugira published an account of her grandmother's life in the Society of Malawi Journal.

== Career ==
Rubadiri began her media career in the United States interning at WMGM – NBC 40 TV as an assignment desk editor in 2007. She later worked as a personal assistant at the Angela Crockett Company in Brooklyn, New York. Upon returning to Kenya in 2010, she joined Capital FM as a business reporter and news presenter. She later moved to NTV Kenya in 2013, where she served as a news anchor, reporter, and script editor co-anchoring the prime time edition alongside Larry Madowo and Mark Maasai. In May 2018, Rubadiri moved to Citizen TV, where she co-anchored Sunday Live with Jeff Koinange in the Citizen Weekend primetime bulletin. In 2020, she was awarded the BBC World News Komla Dumor Award She officially joined CNN International in April 2024.
