= Ministry of Justice (Malawi) =

Government ministry of Togo

Malawi Ministry of Justice and Constitutional Affairs in 2026

The Ministry of Justice (MoJ) of Malawi provides legal advice and services to the government's ministries and departments, as well as the general public. The Ministry represents the government in civil litigation cases and prosecutes criminal cases on behalf of the State, drafts legislation, and vets agreements and treaties on behalf of the government. The Ministry of Justice and Constitutional Affairs contains the following departments:

- The Attorney General's Chambers
- Solicitor General's Chambers
- Directorate of Public Prosecutions
- Department of Registrar General
- Department of Administrator General

The ministry follows the direction of the Minister of Justice and Constitutional Affairs, and is under the supervision of the Solicitor General and Secretary for Justice. It was not uncommon for the Minister of Justice to serve simultaneously as the Attorney General. The current (2026) Minister of Justice is Charles Mhango. Frank Mbeta became Attorney General, Gertrude Hiwa was Solicitor General and Fostino Maele was Director of Public Prosecutions from October 2025.

== List of ministers of justice (mainly post-independence in 1964) ==
- Alan Munro (1957–1963)
- Orton Chirwa (1964) [1st Malawi-born Minister of Justice and Attorney General]
- Bryan Clieve Roberts (1965–1973) [Minister of Justice and Attorney General]
- Hastings Kamuzu Banda (1973–1991)
- Friday Makuta (1992–1993)
- Lovemore Munlo (1993–1994)
- Wehnam Nakanga (1994–1995)
- Collins Chizumira (1995–1996)
- Cassim Chilumpha (1996–1998)
- Peter H. Fachi (1999–2003)
- Henry Dama Phoya (2007–2008)
- Peter Mutharika (2009–2010)
- George Chaponda (2010–2011)
- Ephraim Chiume (2011–2012)
- Ralph Kasambara (2012–2013)
- Samuel Tembenu(2014–2019)
- Bright Msaka(2019–2020)
- Titus Mvalo (2020–2025)
- Charles Mhango (2025–present)

== See also ==
- Justice ministry
- Politics of Malawi
