= Samuel Tembenu =

Politician in Malawi

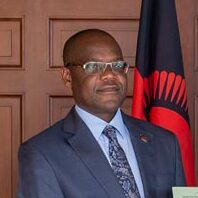
- in 2018
- Born: Samuel Tembenu; 1965 (age 60–61); Salima, Malawi
- Occupations: Activist; politician

Samuel Tembenu (born 1965) is a Malawian politician and lawyer who was former Minister of Justice and Constitutional Affairs of Malawi from 2014 to 2019. He is a Member of Parliament for Dedza North East Constituency. He was succeeded by Bright Msaka (2019–2020).

== Life ==
Tembenu was born in 1965 in [Salima District], Malawi. He attended the University of Malawi, Chancelor College where he graduated with a Law degree. He has had a thriving career as a private practice lawyer, managing his firm. He has a master's degree from the University of Northumbria. In 2014, Tembenu was appointed Minister of Justice, a position he held up until 2019.

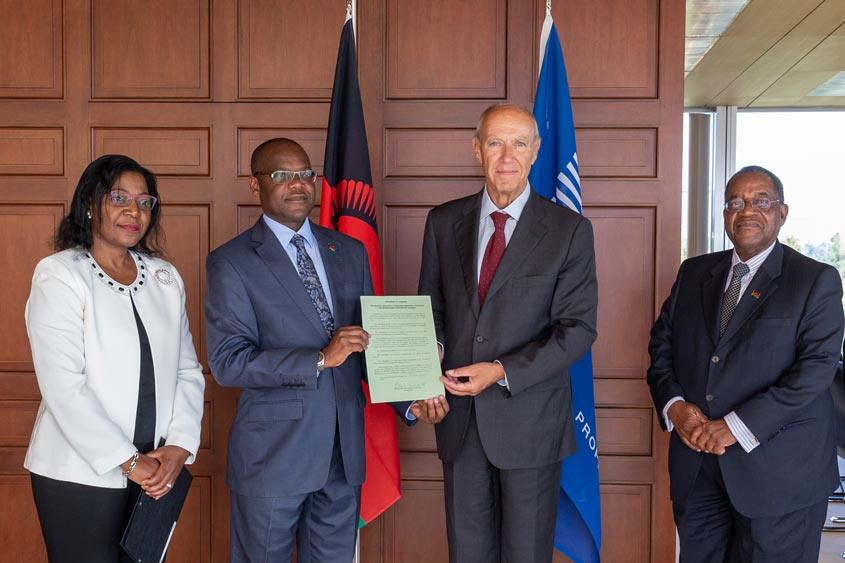
Gertrude Hiwa, Tembenu, Francis Gurry of WIPO and Ambassador Robert Salama in 2018

In 2019 the Constitutional Court nullified the Presidential election which the former President, Peter Mutharika, was reported to have won. The court considered the evidence which included the used of Tippex and decided that another election was required. Mutharika appealled against this decision and Tembenu as his lawyer argued his position.

In 2021 ex-President Peter Mutharika was called to answer enquiries by the Anti-Corruption Bureau (ACB). Tembenu was his lawyer. The ACB wanted to ask Mutharika about 1.5 billion Kwatcha's worth of cement that had been imported using the then President Mutharika's authority. It was alleged that his staff may have used his authority and the ACB wanted to understand how this might have happened.

Awards and achievements
Preceded by Ralph Kasambara	Minister of Justice and Constitutional Affairs of Malawi	Succeeded by Bright Msaka
