= Titus Mvalo =

Politician in Malawi

Honourable Titus Mvalo SC
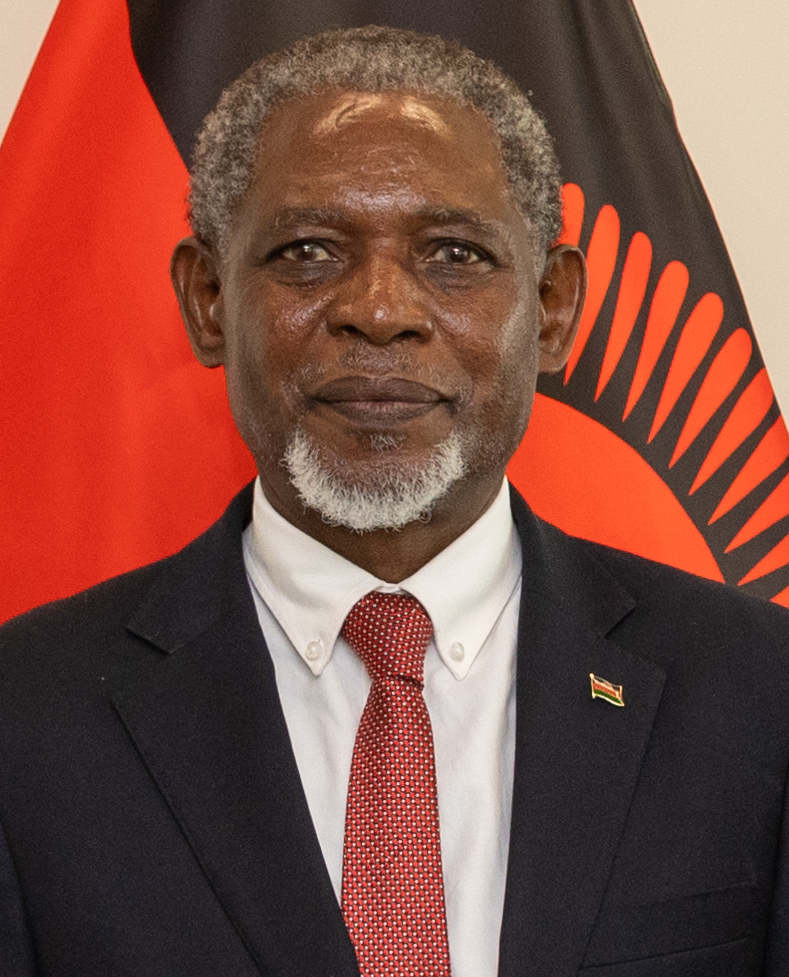
- Mvalo in 2023

Minister of Justice of Malawi
- In office 8 July 2020 – 15 September 2025
- President: Lazarus Chakwera
- Preceded by: Bright Msaka
- Succeeded by: Charles Mhango

Personal details
- Born: Titus Songiso Mvalo; 1964 (age 61–62) Dowa, Malawi
- Party: Malawi Congress Party
- Occupation: Lawyer; politician; educator

Titus Edward Songiso Mvalo SC (born 1964) is a Malawian lawyer, politician, and educator who is the current Minister of Justice of Malawi from July 2020. He is a Member of Parliament for Dowa North East Constituency as well as a lawyer for Madonna in Malawi. He is notable for proposing the abolition of death penalty in Malawi.

== Personal life ==
Mvalo was born in 1964 in Dowa, Malawi. He attended Dowa Secondary School. He has a Master's Degree in Public Policy and Administration.

Political offices
Preceded by Bright Msaka	Minister of Justice of Malawi; 2020–present	Incumbent
