= Bryan Roberts =

Bryan Roberts may refer to:

- Sailor Roberts (Bryan W. Roberts, 1931–1995), American poker player
- Bryan Clieve Roberts (1923–1996), British lawyer, civil servant and colonial administrator
