= Capital Hill Cashgate Scandal =

Malawi government scandal

Capital Hill Cashgate Scandal or "Cashgate" is a financial scandal involving looting, theft and corruption that happened at Capital Hill, the seat of Government of Malawi. The scandal was uncovered during the administration of President Joyce Banda, though it is believed to have begun prior to her taking office.

The scandal first came to light in September 2013, when an accounts assistant in the Ministry of Environment was found with several thousand dollars (USD) in his car. A week later, the Budget Director in the Ministry of Finance was shot outside his home, and several other civil servants were found hiding large sums of money, thus unravelling what came to be known as the "Cashgate" scandal.

Following Cashgate's revelation, the British government sponsored an independent audit into the scandal, focusing on transactions made through Malawi's electronic financial management system. The first audit – released to the public in February 2014 – demonstrated that 16 Malawian companies received illicit payments from the government between April and September 2013 for goods and services that were not performed. All told, the audit found that an estimated $32 million (USD) was stolen during the six-month period under review. In October, 2013, more than 70 people were arrested in connection to Cashgate – many of whom were subsequently tried and convicted. President Joyce Banda also fired her entire cabinet.

In October 2014, Baker Tilly provided the Government of Malawi with a confidential report summarizing individual case files from its original audit. The report – intended to be private and "provided to assist Malawian law enforcement agencies only" – outlines individuals and companies involved in illicit Cashgate-related transactions. It found the primary beneficiary of the scandal to be Osward Lutepo, who has since been sentenced to 11 years in prison.

In November, 2014, after signs that Cashgate-related corruption extended beyond the term of the British government's audit, the German government initiated another audit to review potential theft dating back to 2009, under then-President Bingu wa Mutharika. The results of this audit have not yet been revealed. Several donor countries have since suspended foreign aid funding to Malawi as the scandal is deliberated.

Cashgate remains a high-profile political dispute in Malawi. Current President Lazarus Chakwera and his Tonse Alliance continue to allege Banda's guilt in the scandal, though there is no evidence supporting this claim. Likewise, Banda and her People's Party (PP) have long speculated both Mutharikas’ involvement in Cashgate, citing the mysterious murder of the head of Malawi's Anti-Corruption Bureau, a failure to enact financial reforms and suspicious wealth accumulation of high-ranking DPP members. However, no link between either the former or current President Mutharika and Cashgate has been established.

== Background ==
Most governments of countries have Public Financial Management (PFM) systems that they use to manage the flow of funds across various levels of government. These accounting systems enable a centralised and efficient management of government funds (generally income and expenditure) across departments and enable the money a government receives or spends to be reconciled with the actual funds in the government's bank accounts, countrywide. Due to the vast sums that pass through government bank accounts, it is important that PFM systems be robust and effective at managing government funds (be they raised from taxes, donors, dividends, etc.), detecting and resolving problems.

In 1995 the government of Malawi began implementing a PFM known as an Integrated Financial Management Information System (IFMIS) backed by the World Bank. This system was intended to replace the manual systems that were previously in place. If properly implemented and managed, the IFMIS system automatically links planned budget and actual cash budget demands, allowing managers to efficiently schedule expenditures to minimize cashflow problems and improve public service delivery. Thus, the main reasons for the IFMIS were efficient expenditure control, to provide timely budgeting and accurate financial information across government, to provide a state-of-the-art computerised accounting system and to provide a standardised integrated financial management reporting system across government. A pilot project was launched in five ministries, but was met by many problems, resulting in the termination of the contract with the first supplier. Among the problems encountered during the pilot trial were severe mismanagement, technical problems, funding shortages, disagreements among members of the project (there were three distinct suppliers), insufficient training and staffing cultural challenges, resulting in long delays.

By 2003, the World Bank was financing an IFMIS in Malawi sourced from the CODA Group, to be implemented by a South Africa-based reseller called UES. In 2004, Professor Lise Rakner, a Political scientist and senior researcher at the Chr. Michelsen Institute (CMI) in Norway, the largest centre for development research in Scandinavia published a report in collaboration with researchers from the UK's Department for International Development (DFID) and the Institute of Policy Research and Analysis, titled The budget as theatre – the formal and informal institutional makings of the budget process in Malawi. The report found that "the proposed electronic system, IFMIS, is not being implemented, resented for removing discretionary power to reallocate resources." The report also found that, in addition to rampant fraud and corruption in procurements and disbursements, there were "no adequate records of staff and pensions and advances, leading to problems of ghost workers, especially in the education sector. Staff not paid and not motivated. Incomplete and doctored records: auditing not done."

That same year, a peer-reviewed article in November 2004 identified 21 issues that needed to be resolved for the IFMIS to work properly. For some reason, those issues could not be resolved. In May 2005, the Government decided to adopt and implement an EPICOR-based IFMIS following the study tour to Tanzania in March 2005, and a contract with Soft-Tech Consultants was signed in July 2005.

In November 2005, the new IFMIS was formally introduced and customised to Malawi's own specific requirements across 50 ministries and government entities. According to the UK-sponsored audit – led by accounting firm Baker Tilly – the IFMIS operated as follows:

"IFMIS generates payments to suppliers entered onto the system. In turn, cheques are raised for payment to suppliers and others which are then printed on Reserve Bank of Malawi (RBM) cheques. This function is currently centralized at the Accountant General’s Department. All the payment vouchers, less the supporting documents from the various Ministries, are manually brought to the Accountant General’s Department for verification before cheques are processed. The IFMIS system is designed to enable the GoM to monitor its budget and cash position."

However, reviews of Malawi's IFMIS revealed significant control weaknesses within the system. The GoM suspected that "a number of perpetrators had exploited these weaknesses through collusion, resulting in financial loss to the government exchequer."

=== IFMIS as a Mechanism for Cashgate ===
The government of Malawi soon recognized that the IFMIS was vulnerable to misuse and corruption and commissioned Soft-Tech Consulting Limited – the software solutions technology company that initially implemented the IFMIS – to investigate any illegal exploitation of the system. It is believed that the cash gate scandal caused financial loss to the government.

Soft-Tech found that "perpetrators were able to transfer funds from the government bank accounts to the vendor accounts for goods and services that were never supplied and then to delete these transactions from the IFMIS system." The government and Soft-Tech believed that "the system was manipulated to release funds without lawful authority, create and approve unauthorized payments, issue cheques through the Accountant General’s Department and transfer funds into supplier accounts without authorisation." A subsequent audit revealed that, within IFMIS, "a significant number of transactions had been deleted."

== Cashgate's Unfolding ==
In September 2013, Victor Sithole, a young accounts assistant in Malawi's Environment Ministry was found with roughly $300,000 (USD) in the trunk of his car. A week later, on 13 September, Paul Mphwiyo, Budget Director in Malawi's Ministry of Finance, was shot by armed men who were waiting for him just outside the gate of his house in Lilongwe Area 43. Mphwiyo's wife rushed him to a nearby health clinic, where doctors managed to stabilise his condition. He was transferred to Kamuzu Central Hospital and the next day flown to South Africa for specialist treatment.

In the ensuing days, stories began to emerge that millions of dollars had been embezzled by government officials colluding to defraud the state. Some claimed Paul Mphwiyo was clean, and acting to close the loopholes, others claimed that he was implicated in the corruption. Before long, a web of plots of how civil servants were siphoning funds from government coffers were rife on social media, blogs and online news sources.

=== Initial reaction ===
Upon the emergence of a large-scale corruption scandal, Malawi became enmeshed in chaos and speculation. President Joyce Banda's administration maintained that the looting was made possible because of loopholes in the IFMIS, and also suggested that Mphwiyo may have been shot by the scandal's perpetrators because he was on the verge of busting a corruption syndicate. President Banda – then still a member of the DPP – announced a plan to address the loopholes in the IFMIS and investigate the plunder of public resources. She enlisted a Cabinet Commission chaired by the Minister of Good Governance, Christopher Daza, to oversee this plan and communicate its findings to Malawi's donors.

However, many foreign donors began suspending aid in response to the scandal. On 11 October 2013, Norway froze all budget support to Malawi. In November 2013, Britain followed Norway to delay budget support. The American government said it did not plan to suspend aid since the aid it gives goes to NGOs, not directly to the government, and the IMF delayed a loan worth $20 million. The aid suspended by the EU, Britain and Norway collectively amounted to around $150 million.

By December civil society groups were protesting against the government's handling of the scandal, saying the government was not doing enough to get to the bottom of the matter, and to finalise the investigation. There were numerous calls for the president to resign, however President Banda rejected these calls, saying the scandal was a "golden opportunity" for her government to clean up the civil service in Malawi. With support from the British government, she then initiated a forensic audit into Cashgate and began to take action against the scandal.

=== Cabinet Reshuffling and Arrests ===
The same week in which Malawi's donors suspended their foreign aid, President Joyce Banda sacked her cabinet. On 15 October, a new cabinet was appointed, and notably the former Finance Minister Ken Lipenga, and the former Justice Minister Ralph Kasambara were not included, suggesting that they had been implicated in Cashgate. Additionally, approximately 50 bank accounts, including those of government officials, were frozen. People began to speculate whether the two were implicated in the saga because no formal explanation was given as to why they were dropped.

Malawi's Anti-Corruption Bureau (ACB) also began an investigation into illicit financial activity among civil servants, and started making arrests in connection with Cashgate. Included in the ACB's initial arrests were Alice Namata, a principal administrative officer in the Ministry of Wildlife and Tourism, Robert Nantchito, an accounts assistant in the Ministry of Lands who was working with the Ministry of Trade, and Maxwell Namata. Soon after, one Pika Manondo, a suspect believed to be behind Mphwiyo's shooting was put on an Interpol list.

Later in October, the ACB continued to make arrests. Chazika Munthali, the principal accountant in the Office of President and Cabinet, was charged with approving three vouchers totaling MK 1 billion (~US$2.3 million) to International Procurement Services, a company belonging to one Osward Lutepo, a senior official in the ruling People's Party and Deputy Director of Recruitment and Sensitisation, who eventually became the prime Cashgate suspect. The high-profile arrests continued through October and November, with two other suspects arrested over payments received despite no services provided. By November, more than 50 people had been arrested in connection with the scandal, and on 8 November, the former Justice Minister Ralph Kasambara was arrested for allegedly masterminding the shooting of Paul Mphwiyo. Kasambara would be rearrested on 27 January 2014, for money laundering charges, which he has denied.

It was Ivy Kamanga who sent the first former senior official to jail in 2014. Treza Senzani who had been a tourism civil servant had pleaded guilty and she was sentenced to three year with hard labour.

== Baker Tilly Forensic Audits ==
British accounting firm Baker Tilly was enlisted by the UK's Department of International Development (DFID) to conduct a forensic audit of possible corruption during the period of September to April 2013. It issued two reports of the audit: the first, made public in February 2014, traced approximately $32 million (USD) of stolen funds to 16 Malawian companies, though it did not provide specific transactions or names; the second, delivered confidentially to the Government of Malawi, detailed names of companies and individuals involved in dozens of illegal transactions.

The February 2014 Baker Tilly report found that a total of MK 13,671,396,751 (Malawian Kwacha) was misappropriated during the six-month period of 2013: More than MK 6 billion (45%) in Cashgate transactions; nearly MK 4 billion (29%) in payments with no supporting documents; and MK 3.6 billion (26%) in inflated procurement prices. The report concludes:

"Overall, we have identified funding misappropriation and theft of GoM [Government of Malawi] funds. We have seen funds transferred between unrelated companies, individuals withdrawing funds from unconnected organizations and inflated prices paid to companies with limited or no trading history and very large cash withdrawals. We do not believe the receivers of these funds are therefore the ultimate beneficiary in all cases. However, in our opinion further specific detailed work is needed to support the Malawi Law Enforcement Agencies in investigating these matters across international jurisdictions. In this regard we encourage the international donors to continue to support oversight and thus to support ongoing investigations in order to ensure convictions and, if possible, reparations."

Later in 2014, the British government provided the Auditor General of the Government of Malawi and the Malawi Law Enforcement Agencies with a second report that summarized 53 Cashgate case files. The total financial loss from Cashgate was found to be slightly higher than previously estimated (up to MK 15.5 billion). This report also detailed civil servants, companies, banks, Ministries and other individuals and organizations involved in illicit Cashgate transactions.

The second report demonstrated that Osward Lutepo – who was linked to several businesses implicated in Cashgate – was the primary beneficiary of the scandal, along with a number of other businessmen. Former commander of the Malawi Defence Forces, General Henry Odillo, was also mentioned. Neither President Peter Mutharika nor former President Joyce Banda were cited in this report as linked to Cashgate.
