= Alexious Kamangila =

Malawian lawyer and whistleblower

- Citizenship: Malawian
- Education: University of Malawi
- Occupation: Lawyer
- Years active: 2020s–present
- Known for: Public allegations of corruption within Malawi’s judiciary; whistleblowing advocacy

Alexious Kamangila is a Malawian lawyer and human rights advocate known for public allegations of corruption within Malawi's judiciary and legal profession.

== Career ==
Kamangila came to national public attention in 2024 after making public allegations of corruption involving members of Malawi's judiciary and legal sector. According to media reports, his claims triggered public debate and reactions from civil society organisations and professional bodies.

In February 2025, the All Africa Conference of Churches (AACC) publicly called on the Government of Malawi to protect whistle-blowers, including Kamangila, citing his role in exposing alleged corruption.

He has also publicly criticised the handling of high-profile corruption-related cases and called for government action on alleged corruption in the judiciary.

== Legal controversies ==
Kamangila has been involved in legal disputes connected to his public statements and legal practice.

According to reports, a Malawian court found him guilty of perjury in relation to a sworn affidavit filed in connection with a criminal case, with the Malawi Law Society stating it could not take disciplinary action without a High Court directive. In February 2026, it also declined a request by Kamangila to represent him in a K250 million defamation suit brought by High Court Judge Kenan Manda, stating that the matter did not meet the threshold for institutional legal support. In March 2026, during preliminary proceedings in the defamation case filed against him by Judge Manda, Kamangila submitted a witness list that included Chief Justice Rizine Mzikamanda, Deputy Chief Justice Lovemore Chikopa and several officials from the Malawi Law Society. Court records indicated that some of the witnesses would be subpoenaed to testify.

In May 2026, the High Court of Malawi found Kamangila liable in the defamation case brought by Judge Kenan Manda and ordered him to pay damages. The court also directed him to remove the statements found to be defamatory, with the amount of compensatory, aggravated and exemplary damages to be assessed separately by the Registrar of the High Court and Supreme Court of Appeal.

Media reports have also indicated he faced defamation-related legal disputes linked to his corruption allegations against members of the judiciary.

In February 2026, Kamangila made further public corruption allegations during a Facebook broadcast, describing a Finance Bank of Malawi (FBM) payout judgement as "outright corruption" and alleging that senior judicial officers had manipulated the judgement. In the same period, he publicly criticised Attorney General Frank Mbeta, stating that Malawi's anti-corruption efforts could not succeed while Mbeta remained in office.

== Public profile ==
Kamangila has described himself as a campaigner against corruption within the justice system and has used social media platforms to publicise his views and allegations regarding judicial accountability.
