= Mandala House =

Oldest house in Blantyre

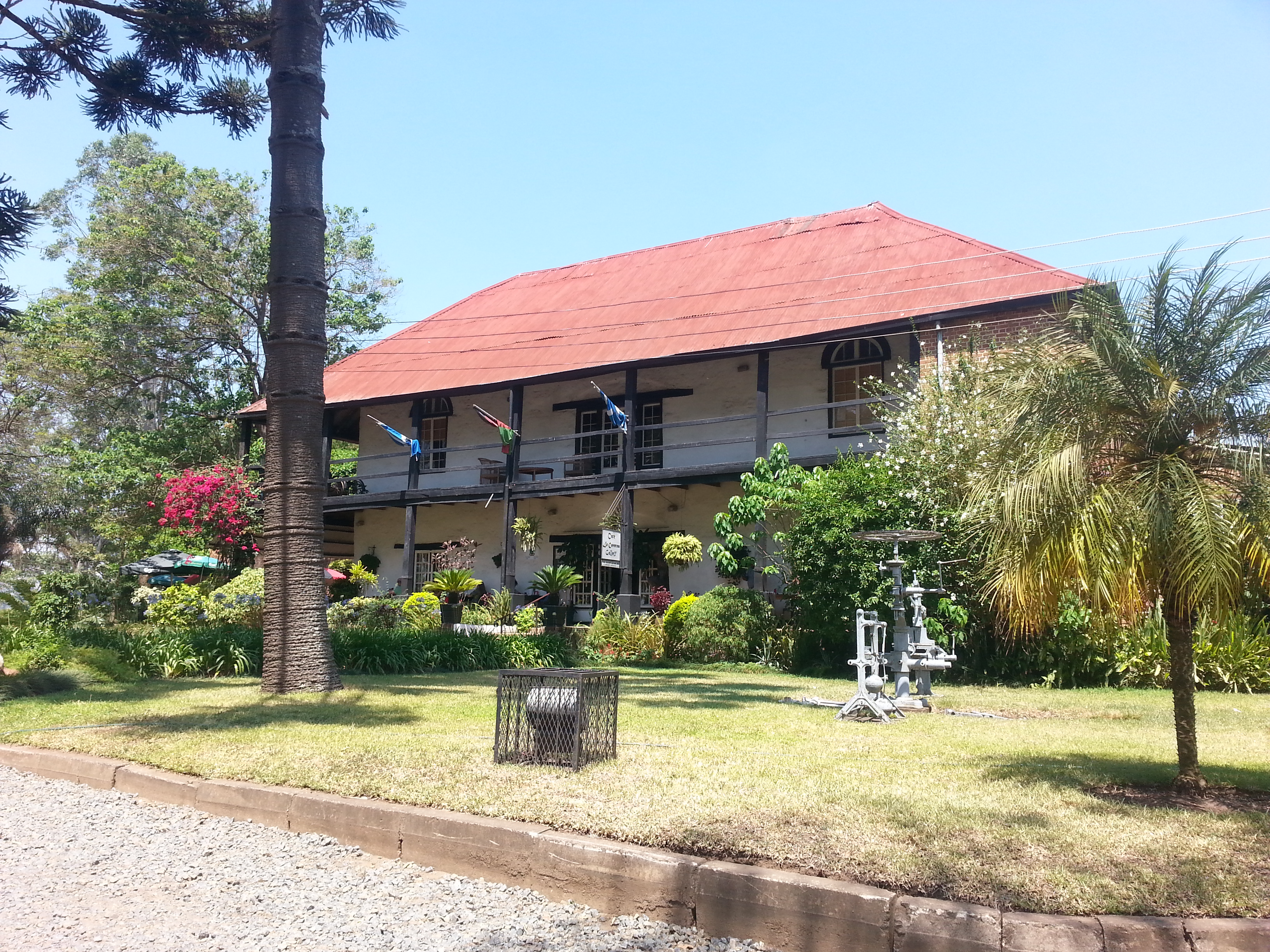
- Interactive map of the Mandala House area

General information
- Completed: 1882

Technical details
- Material: bricks, mud, wood

Mandala House is a historic site located in Blantyre, Malawi. The building was formerly a residence built in 1882 by the African Lakes Corporation. The building served as the Scottish company's headquarters and it was also the base for the Standard Bank. It is the oldest European style house in Blantyre.

== Description ==
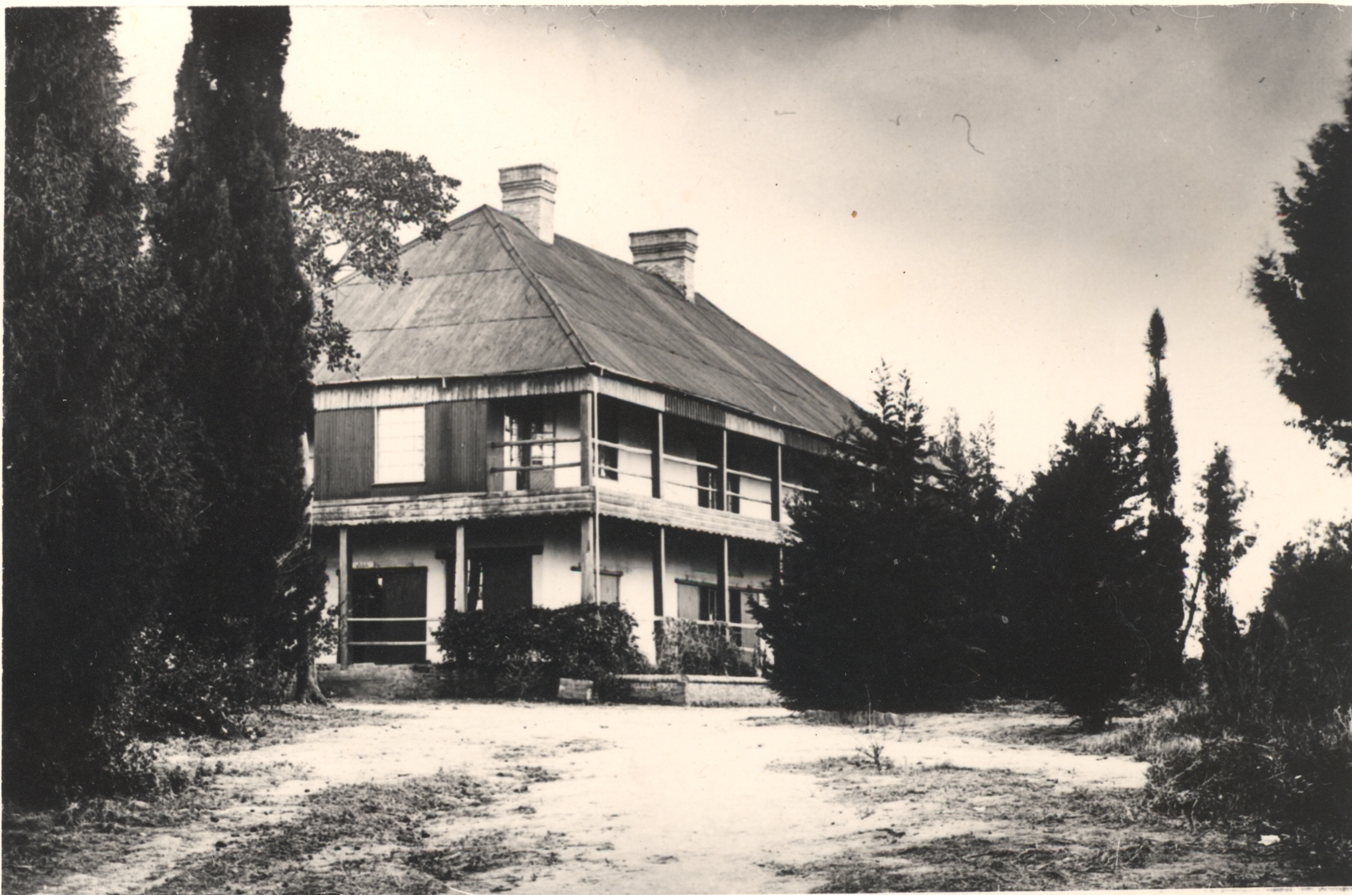

The house was built in 1882 for their managers of African Lakes Corporation, although by the following year it was also the headquarters of the Standard Bank. In 1895 the bank began to import British coinage which could be kept in the bank's vault - which still survives.

The house is built in the colonial style and is wrapped by an encasing veranda. The site includes a garden on the property, and currently is a managed historical site that is home to the "Mandala Cafe", the "La Caverna" art gallery, and the main library and offices of the Society of Malawi, Historical and Scientific.

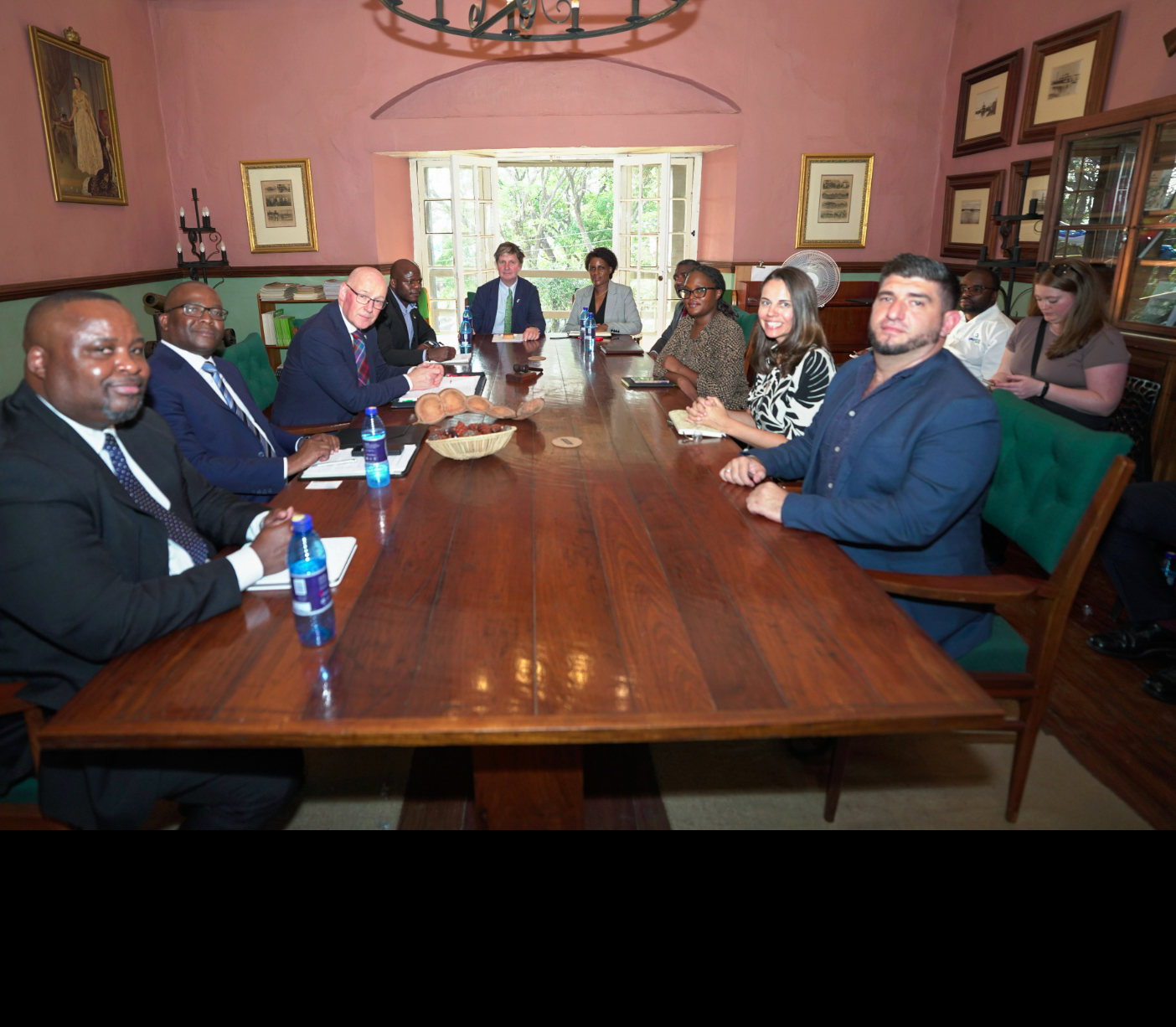
Scottish First Minister John Swinney inside Mandala House

In 2025 the Scottish First Minister, John Swinney, visited Malawi for four days and he attended a meeting hosted in the house. The house had been the main office of the Africa Lakes Company in Malawi, but the company was based in Glasgow in Scotland. It is the oldest European style house and it was built from bricks and mud. The design included a veranda but it was also intended to be defensive in case of conflict.
