= Malawi University of Business and Applied Sciences =

Public university in Blantyre, Malawi

Malawi University of Business and Applied Science
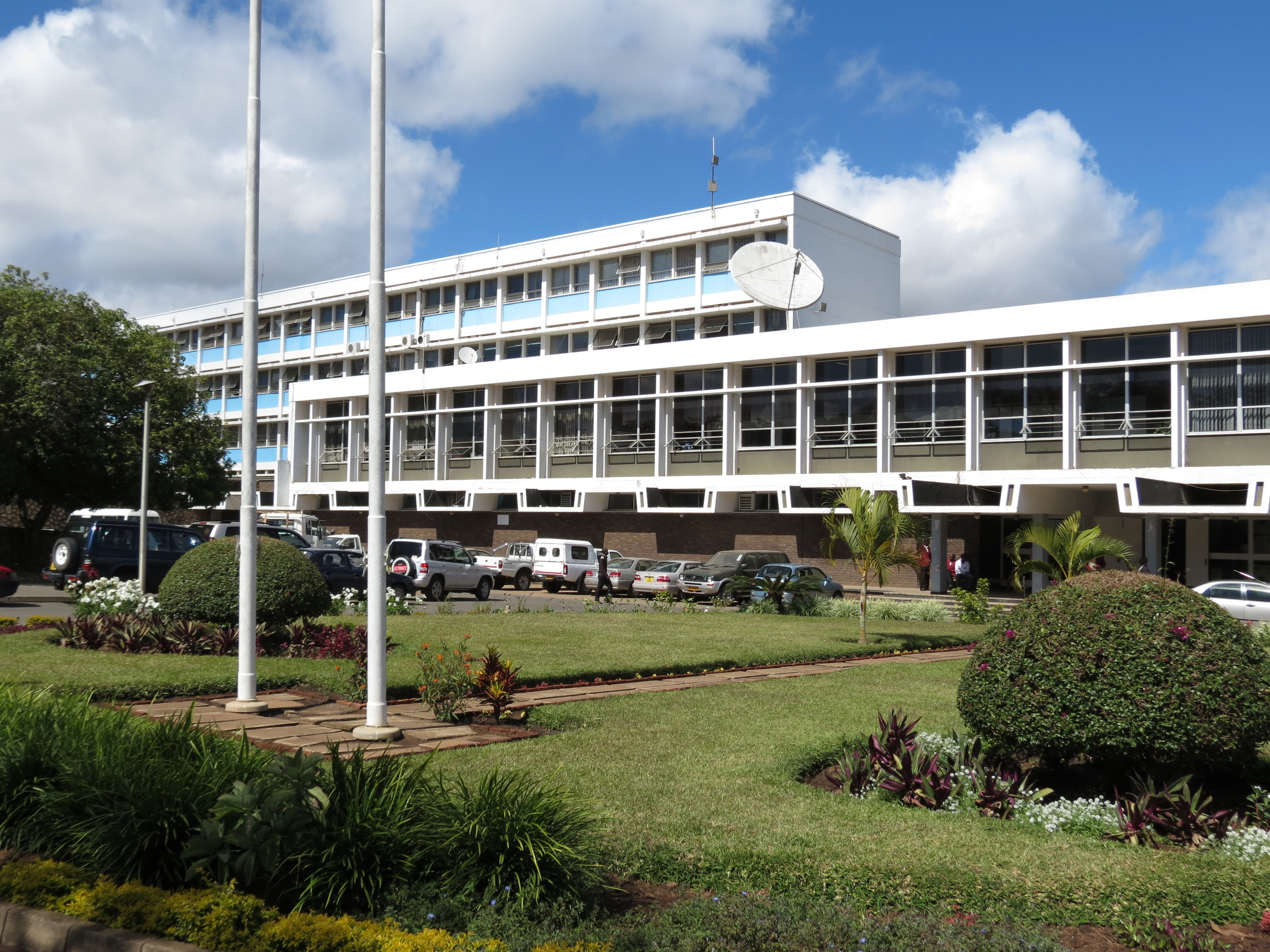
- Former names: The Malawi Polytechnic
- Type: Public
- Established: 2019
- Vice-Chancellor: Nancy Chitera
- Location: Blantyre, Malawi; 15°48′18″S 35°2′19″E
- Website: www.mubas.ac.mw

The Malawi University of Business and Applied Science (MUBAS) is a public university based in the city of Blantyre, Malawi. In 2025, 320 students graduated.

== History ==
The facility was originally named the Malawi Polytechnic when it was part of the University of Malawi, which was founded in 1965. The new MUBAS university was established in 2019 by Malawi's president through the University of Business and Applied Sciences Act.

In 2021, associate professor Nancy Chitera was appointed as the acting vice-chancellor.

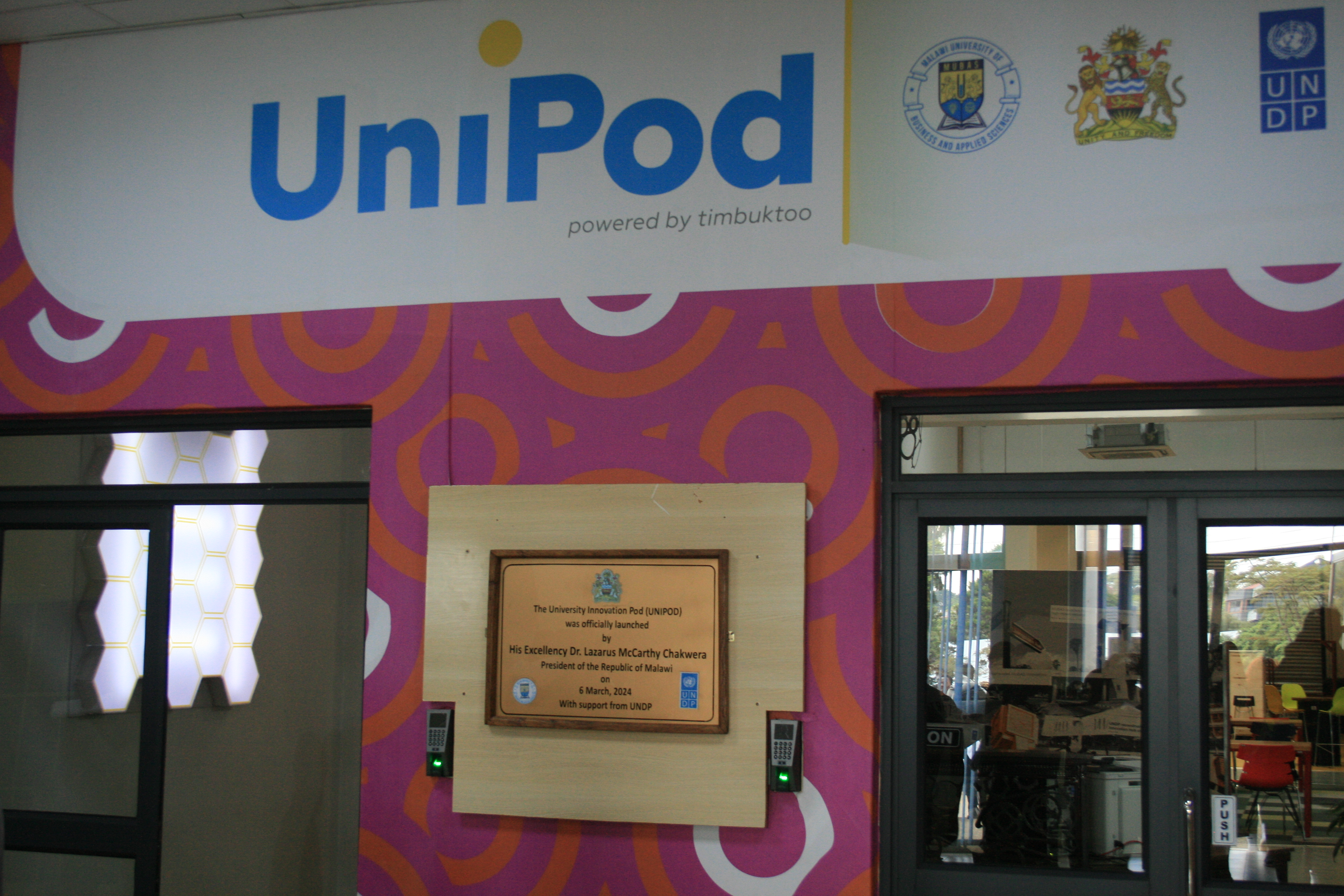
The UNIPOD in 2026

In 2022, the university created a 'UniPod', a workstation area housing several machines that allow students to rapidly experiment and create new prototypes. It was opened by the president in 2024. The Pod project was funded by the United Nations Development Programme, which asked universities to demonstrate their contemporary impact. The UniPod was involved in the development of devices that allow a computer to be controlled by someone's eye movements. The development was developed by MUBAS graduate Chimwemwe Liwonde, who won a national social impact competition organised by the Malawi Communications Regulatory Authority in 2026.

== Organisation ==
MUBAS has five schools, consisting of Science and Technology, Engineering, the Built Environment, Business and Economics, Education, and the Communication and Media School.

In 2025, the school's seventh graduation ceremony concluded with the graduation of 320 students.

In 2026, a new Open and Distance e-Learning campus was being built. The minister of education, Bright Msaka, saw this as essential for Malawi, with plans to triple enrollment to 30,000 students by 2030. Associate Professor Nancy Chitera, the vice chancellor of the university, announced in 2026 that MUBAS would manufacture and assemble tractors, maize shellers, crop planters and maize harvesters. MUBAS had made a substantial investment and planned to create new tractors within three years.

== Alumni ==
Rachel Kachaje, who became Malawi's Minister for Disabilities, attended evening courses at the university.
