= Jacqueline McLaren =

Scottish politician

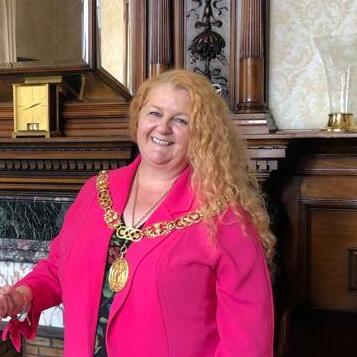

Lord Provost of Glasgow
- Incumbent
- Assumed office 19 May 2022
- Preceded by: Philip Braat

Member of Glasgow City Council
- Incumbent
- Assumed office 5 May 2022
- Constituency: Canal Ward

Lord Lieutenant of the City of Glasgow
- Incumbent
- Assumed office 19 May 2022
- Monarch: Charles III
- Preceded by: Philip Braat

Personal details
- Born: c. 1965 Maryhill, Glasgow, Scotland
- Party: Scottish National Party
- Children: 1
- Occupation: Politician

Jacqueline McLaren (born c.1965) is a Scottish National Party councillor in Glasgow. She became the Lord Provost of Glasgow in 2022.

== Life ==
McLaren was born in about 1965 and was brought up in the Maryhill area of Glasgow. Some of her early work was for Boots the Chemist.

She became a politician after she was a leading figure in a campaign to save school buses in 2015.

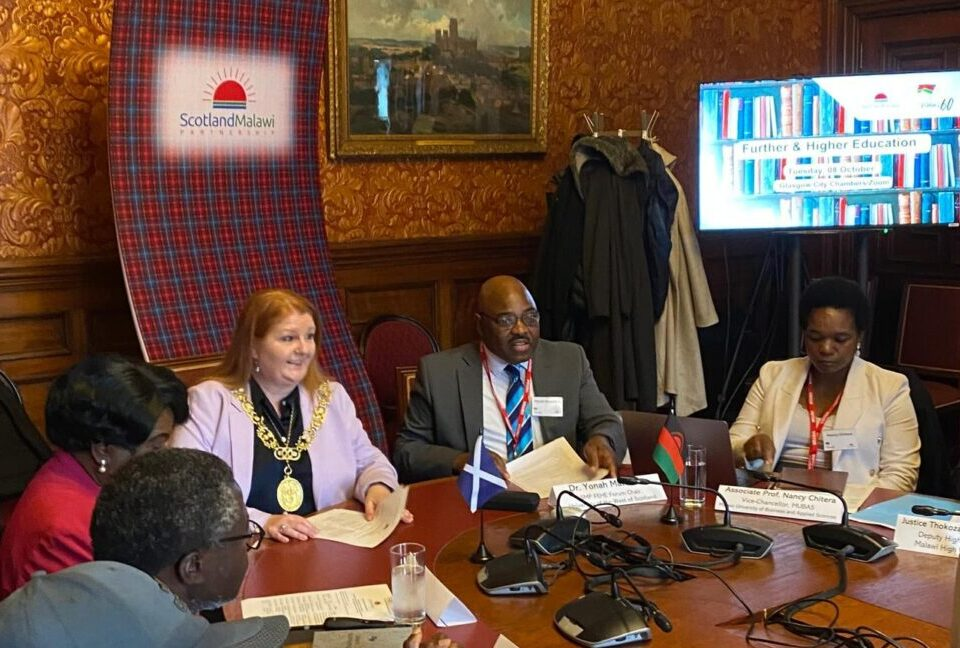
Scotland Malawi Partnership's Further & Higher Education Forum in October 2024. L to R: Wapulumuka Mulwafu, Address Malata, Jacqueline McLaren, Dr Yonah Matemba and Nancy Chitera

McLaren became the Lord Provost of Glasgow in 2022, succeeding Philip Braat. The position dates from 1450 and she also became Lord Lieutenant and Glasgow's First Citizen. There are four Lord Provosts in Scotland but she is the only woman. She has an official residence, where she replaced the artwork to reflect that she is an ordinary woman. Glasgow and Edinburgh's Lord Provosts serve as co-presidents of the Scotland Malawi Partnership and she continued this tradition.

HMS Glasgow was christened on 22 May 2025 at BAE Scotstoun by Catherine, Princess of Wales. McLaren attended together with William, Prince of Wales, Second Sea Lord, Vice Admiral Sir Martin Connell, the managing director of BAE Systems Maritime – Naval Ships, Simon Lister.

== Personal life ==
She and her partner, Ian McCarthy, have a son who trained to be a doctor.

== Awards ==
The University of Strathclyde awarded her an honorary degree.
