= Rachel Kachaje =

Malawian disability activist and politician

- Born: 5 May 1958; Kasungu District
- Died: 3 September 2020 (aged 62)
- Education: evening courses at Malawi Polytechnic
- Employer: National Bank
- Known for: Minister for Disability
- Spouse: Gibson Kachaje

Rachel Kachaje (5 May 1958 – 3 September 2020) was a Malawian disability activist. She became Malawi's minister for disability in 2013.

== Life ==
Kachaje was born in 1958 in Linga Village in Kasungu District. She lost her ability to walk when she was three due to polio. Her parents could not afford a wheelchair so she was carried to Kanjedza Primary School by her mother or one of her seven siblings. Her father worked for the Malawi Broadcasting Corporation and her mother brewed Kachasu.

She attended Chichiri Secondary in Blantyre after mobility issues meant that she could not exploit the place she had won at HHI Secondary School. At one point she was nearly drowned after she set out to pull herself across a river using the remains of a washed away bridge.

She stayed at home for a year after she failed to get to university. She was first employed by the National Bank who got her details from a failed application to the Malawi Council for the Handicapped. She worked as a telephone operator, but her ambition led her to apply to Malawi Polytechnic. She took various evening courses but her success did not automatically lead to promotion.

In 2001 she joined the Southern African Federation of the Disabled and in the following year she became their first woman chair. In 2002 she co-founded Disability Women in Africa.

Joyce Banda became Malawi's first woman President and she chose Kacheje to be the Minister of Disability and Elderly Affairs in 2013 even though she was not an elected politician.

She died in 2020 and she was buried with military honours. Joyce Banda spoke at her funeral. She missed out on receiving an honorary degree from Stellenbosch University that was scheduled for December 2020. That years virtual Afrinead conference was dedicated to her memory.

== Personal life ==
She married Gibson Kachaje from Nsalu in Lilongwe in 1986.
