= Thabo Chakaka Nyirenda =

Malawian lawyer and former attorney general

Honourable Thabo Chakaka Nyirenda

Attorney General of Malawi

Senior Counsel
- In office 27 August 2021 – 27 October 2025
- President: Lazarus Chakwera
- Preceded by: Chikosa Silungwe
- Succeeded by: Frank Mbeta

Personal details
- Born: 9 May 1982 (age 44) Mphompha, Rumphi District, Malawi
- Spouse: Thokozire Jere
- Children: 3
- Education: University of Malawi; University of Sussex

Thabo Chakaka Nyirenda SC (born 9 May 1982) is a Malawian legal practitioner who served as the 20th attorney general of the Republic of Malawi between 2021 and 2025. In his capacity as the attorney general, he held several ex officio positions, including as head of the Malawi Bar and as hairperson of the Malawi Council for Legal Education, who oversees standards of legal training and professional development within the Republic. Prior to his appointment as the attorney general, Nyirenda served as an in-house legal counsel and manager of the Ethics and Compliance division of the Reserve Bank of Malawi, where he played a role in strengthening legal and regulatory frameworks for financial integrity and institutional accountability.

== Education ==
In 2001, Nyirenda joined the former Chancellor College of the University of Malawi, where he was initially enrolled to earn a Bachelor of Arts in Humanities (BAH). One year into his career, he crossed to the Faculty of Law, where he graduated with a Bachelor of Laws (LLB) in 2006. In 2018, he received a Master of Laws Degree (LLM) in International Financial Law from the University of Sussex in the United Kingdom.

During his university studies, Nyirenda actively participated in various extracurricular and leadership initiatives, both locally and internationally. While a student at University of Malawi, he served as director of Publications, Information, and Publicity for his Students’ Union. Later—during his postgraduate studies at the University of Sussex—he was elected as the Black Students' Representative within the National Union of Students, advocating for the interests of students with non-European heritage throughout the United Kingdom.

== Career ==
Nyirenda worked as a senior legal aid advocate from 2006 to 2008. He joined the Malawian Ministry of Justice and Constitutional Affairs in August 2008 as a senior state advocate, where he worked as government lawyer in both criminal and civil suits. He was also employed at the Reserve Bank of Malawi as a legal counselor from July 2010.

On 27 August 2021, President Lazarus Chakwera of Malawi appointed Nyirenda to Attorney General, replacing Chikosa Silungwe. As attorney general, Nyirenda's primary contributions have been in financial regulation, central banking law, and sovereign debt. On July 4, 2025, In recognition of his leadership and expertise—particularly in the domains of public law, commercial law, financial regulation, and central banking—Nyirenda was titled Senior Counsel (SC), the Malawian equivalent of King's Counsel (KC), making him the youngest ever person to receive this title.

== Family ==
Nyirenda has been married to Thokozire Jere since 2010. Together they have three children: one son, named Dumisani; and two daughters, named Chimango and Thembisile.
