= Gift Trapence =

Malawian human rights activist

- Citizenship: Malawi
- Occupation: Human rights activist
- Organization(s): Centre for the Development of People (CEDEP), Human Rights Defenders Coalition (HRDC)
- Known for: LGBTQ+ rights advocacy, Pro-democracy activism

Gift Trapence is a Malawian human rights defender. He is the executive director of the Centre for the Development of People (CEDEP), an organisation advocating for the rights of marginalised communities, including LGBTQ+ individuals. Trapence also serves as the chairperson of the Human Rights Defenders Coalition (HRDC), a national network of human rights organizations in Malawi.

== Activism and career ==
Trapence, as executive director of the Centre for the Development of People (CEDEP), advocates for the rights of LGBTQI+ individuals in Malawi, where same-sex relations are criminalised. Under Trapence's leadership, CEDEP supports marginalised communities through resources and representation.

Trapence also chairs the Human Rights Defenders Coalition (HRDC), an organization in Malawi's human rights and governance landscape. The HRDC has led protests against corruption, impunity, and electoral irregularities. Following the disputed 2019 Malawian presidential election, Trapence and the HRDC organised demonstrations demanding electoral justice. These protests contributed to the Constitutional Court's annulment of the election results and the order for a new election in 2020.

== Arrest and legal challenges ==
In March 2020, he and other Human Rights Defenders Coalition (HRDC) leaders was arrested, accusing them of inciting violence. The charges were later dropped. Organisations like Front Line Defenders and the World Organisation Against Torture (OMCT) have documented his legal challenges, highlighting the difficulties activists face in the country.

== Publications ==
Trapence has contributed to research and publications focusing on human rights, HIV/AIDS, and the challenges faced by key populations in Malawi.

- Readiness for Use of HIV Preexposure Prophylaxis Among Men Who Have Sex With Men in Malawi: Qualitative Focus Group and Interview Study. DOI: 10.2196/26177
- HIV Prevalence, Risks for HIV Infection, and Human Rights among Men Who Have Sex with Men (MSM) in Malawi, Namibia, and Botswana
- Feasibility of a combination HIV prevention program for men who have sex with men in Blantyre, Malawi. DOI: 10.1097
- A qualitative assessment of health seeking practices among and provision practices for men who have sex with men in Malawi.
- Stigma, Health Care Access, and HIV Knowledge Among Men Who Have Sex with Men (MSM) in Malawi, Namibia, and Botswana.
