= Frank Mbeta =

Attorney General of Malawi

Honourable Frank Farouk Mbeta

Attorney General of Malawi
- Incumbent
- Assumed office 27 October 2025
- President: Peter Mutharika
- Preceded by: Thabo Chakaka Nyirenda

Personal details
- Party: Democratic Progressive Party
- Education: University of Malawi
- Profession: Lawyer

Frank Farouk Mbeta is a Malawian lawyer who was appointed Attorney General of the Republic of Malawi in October 2025. He has also represented clients in several high-profile cases.

== Career ==
Mbeta was one of the lead lawyers representing President Peter Mutharika during the 2019 presidential election case before the Constitutional Court.

He has handled commercial and constitutional litigation in his private practice in Blantyre.

In October 2025, he was appointed as the 21st Attorney General of the Republic of Malawi.

== Legal issues and controversies ==
In October 2020, the Anti‑Corruption Bureau announced it planned to prosecute Mbeta for alleged bribery dating to 2015, accusing him of offering 2 million Kwacha to an MRA ICT manager to delete files. He has also been linked by media reports to allegations of judge-shopping and improper influence in commercial disputes. Local media also reported that he withdrew from defending foreign minister George Chaponda in a corruption-related case in 2017 under uncertain circumstances. However, no actual conviction was made.

In February 2026, lawyer Alexious Kamangila alleged that Malawi’s anti-corruption efforts could not succeed while Mbeta served as Attorney General. Few days later, activist Sylvester Namiwa also called on Mbeta to resign from his position following corruption allegations. Namiwa made the remarks during a media briefing, after writing to the Office of the Attorney General raising similar concerns.

In March 2026, Mbeta was implicated in controversy surrounding the purchase of the Amaryllis Hotel in Blantyre using public pension funds. He was scheduled to appear before Parliament’s Public Accounts Committee investigating the transaction but asked to be excused due to other commitments, prompting the committee to order that he be summoned to appear at a later date. He later declined to appear before the committee again, stating in a communication to Parliament that proper legal procedures had not been followed in summoning him. Mbeta said he remained willing to testify but requested that he be scheduled as the final witness and be given seven day's notice before appearing. On 25 March, Mbeta appeared before the committee, where he denied involvement in the deal and said his role had been limited to legal advice. He also told the committee that trustees of the Public Service Pension Trust Fund had failed to conduct adequate due diligence before the transaction.
