= Mary Shawa =

Malawian former public official

Dr. Mary Shawa
- Citizenship: Malawian
- Education: Master's Degree in Clinical Nutrition and Dietetics. Postgraduate Diploma in Community Development and Resources PhD in Nutrition with a specialization in Public Health and Socioeconomics.
- Alma mater: King's College, University of London University of Malawi.
- Occupations: A senior public health specialist at Plan International Malawi and the Honorary President of the charity Chifundo & Chinasa
- Years active: 39 years
- Employer(s): Ministry of Gender, Children, Disabilities and Social Welfare
- Known for: Malawian public official, academic, and public health specialist.
- Notable work: A prominent Advocate for Public Health An Instrumental for negotiating for the United Nations Sustainable Development Goals (SDGs) and the African Union Agenda 2063 on behalf of Malawi.

Mary Shawa is a Malawian former public official. From 2004 through 2012, she was the Principal Secretary for Nutrition, HIV and AIDS in the Ministry of Health and Population, and then she was the Principal Secretary of the Ministry of Gender, Children, Disabilities and Social Welfare before her retirement from civil service in 2018.

== Education ==
Shawa has a master's degree in clinical nutrition dietetics, a diploma in agriculture, a PhD in nutrition and socioeconomic development, and a postgraduate diploma in community development and resources.

== Career ==
In November 2004, Shawa became the Principal Secretary for Nutrition, HIV and AIDS in the Ministry of Health and Population in Malawi. In 2005, she participated in a public debate about planned changes to the law to criminalize the deliberate spread of HIV. In 2008, she announced the government decision to replace financial support with food for Malawian civil servants with HIV. In July 2010, she participated in a public health campaign with other political leaders.

In April 2012, after Joyce Banda became president of Malawi, Shawa was appointed as the Principal Secretary of the Ministry of Gender, Children, Disabilities and Social Welfare. In 2014, she shared her perspective on the causes of domestic violence with Voice of America, "The most common violence with the women perpetrate against men is denying their conjugal rights. It is the highly reported violence and that particular violence is what results in women being battered being hacked and so forth." In 2016, she pushed for increased focus on childhood nutrition. During her tenure, she was also responsible for the health and safety of people with albinism. Despite evidence of a market for body parts motivating the murder of Malawians with albinism, Shawa said ministry research showed no market existed, and that people attempting to find a market would instead find undercover police officers.

After retiring from the civil service June 19 2018, she remained the honorary president of Chifundo & Chinasa charity.

Shawa called on Malawians to vote for a "God-fearing" candidate in the 2019 Malawian general election.

In 2021 she was working as a senior public health specialist at Plan International Malawi.

=== Selected publications ===
- Prevention of mother-to-child transmission of HIV and the health-related Millennium Development Goals: time for a public health approach, The Lancet, July 16, 2011, DOI:https://doi.org/10.1016/S0140-6736(10)62303-3 (co author with 17 others)
- Prevalence of Sexual Violence Against Children and Use of Social Services — Seven Countries, 2007–2013, Morbidity and Mortality Weekly Report, 2015 Jun 5 (co-author with 18 others)
