= Vera Chirwa =

Malawian born lawyer and human and civil rights activist

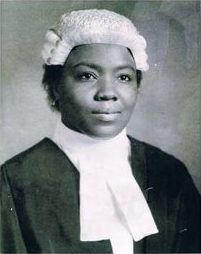
- Chirwa in the 1960s
- Born: 26 May 1932 (age 94); Nyasaland
- Occupation: Lawyer
- Known for: Malawi's first woman lawyer 1981–1993 detention
- Notable work: Fearless Fighter
- Spouse: Orton Chirwa

Vera Mlangazua Chirwa (born 26 May 1932) is a Malawi-born lawyer and human and civil rights activist. She was Malawi's first woman lawyer and a founding member of the Malawi Congress Party and the Nyasaland African Women's League. She fought for multiparty democratic rule in Malawi and was charged with treason, tried and sentenced to death by President Kamuzu Banda. She spent 12 years on death row. She was married to lawyer Orton Chirwa, Malawian Minister of Justice and Attorney General, who later died in prison.

== Early life ==
Vera Chirwa was born in Malawi (then Nyasaland) on 26 May 1932.

== Political career ==
In the early 1950s, Vera Chirwa joined forces with Rose Chibambo to form the Nyasaland African Women's League, which worked with the Nyasaland African Congress to gain Nyasaland's separation from the unpopular Federation of Rhodesia and Nyasaland. She became Nyasaland's first woman lawyer, and was a founding member of the Malawi Congress Party in 1959. After Nyasaland gained self-government in 1961 and became the independent state of Malawi two years later, Orton Chirwa, Vera's husband, became a senior figure in the new government as Minister of Justice and Attorney General.

After having a falling out with Kamuzu Banda, Chirwa and her husband were declared enemies of the state.

=== Exile and capture ===
The couple were forced into exile in Tanzania a few weeks later by Banda. They lived in Tanzania, but traveled to Zambia, Great Britain and the United States of America. On Christmas Eve 1981, Vera and Orton Chirwa were kidnapped in the East of Zambia by Malawi security forces and taken back to Malawi to face charges of high treason.

=== Trial ===
The Chirwas were tried by a “traditional” court. Both lawyers, conducted their own defense, as traditional courts did not allow defence lawyers in a trial lasting two months in front of judges appointed by Dr. Banda. This case of demonstrated the deficiencies in the system. At the end of their appeal in 1983, the minority of the appellate judges that had legal training opposed the guilty verdict, but it was overruled by the majority composed of traditional chiefs. On the day of the trial Vera defiantly raised her hand to speak and looking the magistrate straight in the eye asked him on what grounds they were accused. Questioning the court was forbidden and the response she received was, "Nothing but you are culprit!".

At their trial, the Chirwas claimed that they had been abducted from Zambia in December 1981. This, and the charge that they had conspired to overthrow the government outside Malawi, should have meant that the Traditional courts had no jurisdiction. The case could still have been heard in Malawi's High Court, but that court required proof of guilt beyond reasonable doubt. The treason case heard against the Chirwas by the Southern Region Traditional Court in 1983 was based on handwritten documents said to have been found in a bag belonging to Vera when she was arrested, and a police officer's “expert” testimony that they were indeed in Orton Chirwa's handwriting. An unsigned statement said to have been made by Orton Chirwa, but repudiated by him, and a transcript said to have been made of a taped interview he had given were also admitted as evidence. This evidence, dubious as it was, was evidence only against Orton Chirwa, not Vera. The only case against her was that the documents were said to have been found in her bag, which she denied. The Chirwas were not allowed to call witnesses from outside Malawi and were both sentenced to death. After the trial, the couple were taken to the central prison in Zomba. According to Chirwa, "En route we forgave the people who gave false testimonies, the judges and even the President." It was the last time she and her husband traveled together.

On the Chirwas' appeal to the National Traditional Court of Appeal, the refusal of the lower court to allow defence witnesses, its admission of Orton Chirwa's unsigned statement and its acceptance of a police officer as an expert witness were all criticised, and minority of the judges did not accept that his creation of an unpublished handwritten documents amounted to treason. However the appeal court came to the startling conclusion that, even if the Traditional courts had no jurisdiction in law, they had a traditional right to try the Chirwas, and that (despite the deficiencies in the lower court's handling of the case), their decision was correct and should stand. The death sentences were commuted, but Orton Chirwa later died in prison.

=== Imprisonment and release ===
Conditions in the female ward were tough. Chirwa was subjected to torture and other forms of brutality. She slept on the cement floor, refused to eat the vile food, and was denied visitors, letters from her husband and the right to go outside. She remained in prison on death row for 12 years but remained hopeful for release. She credits her Christian faith for enabling her to keep hope and faith.

In 1990 Amnesty International launched an urgent action to release Orton and Vera Chirwa. In autumn 1992, when a delegation of British legal experts was allowed to pay them a visit, the Chirwas were allowed to see one another again for the first time in 8 years. Orton died in his cell 3 weeks later at the age of 73. Chirwa was not able to attend the funeral.

Banda pardoned her for "humanitarian reasons", and she was released on January 24, 1993 when the country was transitioning to a multi-party state following the end of Banda's rule.

== Current career ==
=== Human rights activism ===
In 2000, she was made the Special Reporter on prison conditions in Africa for the African Commission on Human and Peoples' Rights. She also founded the NGO Malawi Centre for Advice, Research and Education on Rights (Malawi CARER) and heads this organization. She campaigned for an end of the death penalty. She continued her fight for human and political rights under the Bakili Muluzi and the Bingu wa Mutharika governments. She also works for Women's Voice, a gender rights organization.

=== Political activism ===
Chirwa continues to fight for political rights and has attempted to stand as an independent candidate for president, a challenging task in a country with a party system for someone who is not an established politician.

== Vera Chirwa Human Rights Award ==
The Vera Chirwa Human Rights award is awarded by the Centre for Human Rights at the University of Pretoria in South Africa to an individual "who best epitomises the true African human rights lawyer" and has "made an outstanding contribution to the protection and promotion of human rights in Africa." Recipients are alumni of the Master of Laws programs in Human Rights and Democratization at the University of Pretoria. In 2006 when Chtrwa center received UNESCO Prize, Vera Chirwa human rights award was established.

Previous winners of the prize are:

- 2020: Prof Benyam Mezmur
- 2019: Judge Lydia Mugambe-Ssali (Uganda)
- 2019 Journalist Joojo Cobbinah (Ghana)
- 2017: Melanie Smuts (South Africa) and Musu Bakoto Sawo (The Gambia)
- 2015: Prof Christopher Mbazira (Uganda) and Salima Namusobya (Uganda)
- 2014: Leda Hasila Limann (Ghana)
- 2013: Augustin Kounkiné Somé (Burkina Faso)
- 2012: Dr Lilian Chenwi (Cameroon)
- 2012: Monica Mbaru (Kenya)
- 2011: Mr Thulani Maseko (Swaziland)
- 2010: Mr Yoseph Mulugeta (Ethiopia)
- 2009: Mr Gabriel Shumba (Zimbabwe)
- 2008: Mr Julius Osega (Uganda) (posthumously)
- 2007: Ms Nana Oye Lithur(Ghana)
- 2006: Mr Melron Nicol-Wilson (Sierra Leone, LLM in Human Rights and Constitutional Practice, 1998)

== Publications ==
- Fearless Fighter, autobiography(McMillan Publishing) - 2007

== See also ==
- First women lawyers around the world
