= Bright Msaka =

Malawian politician

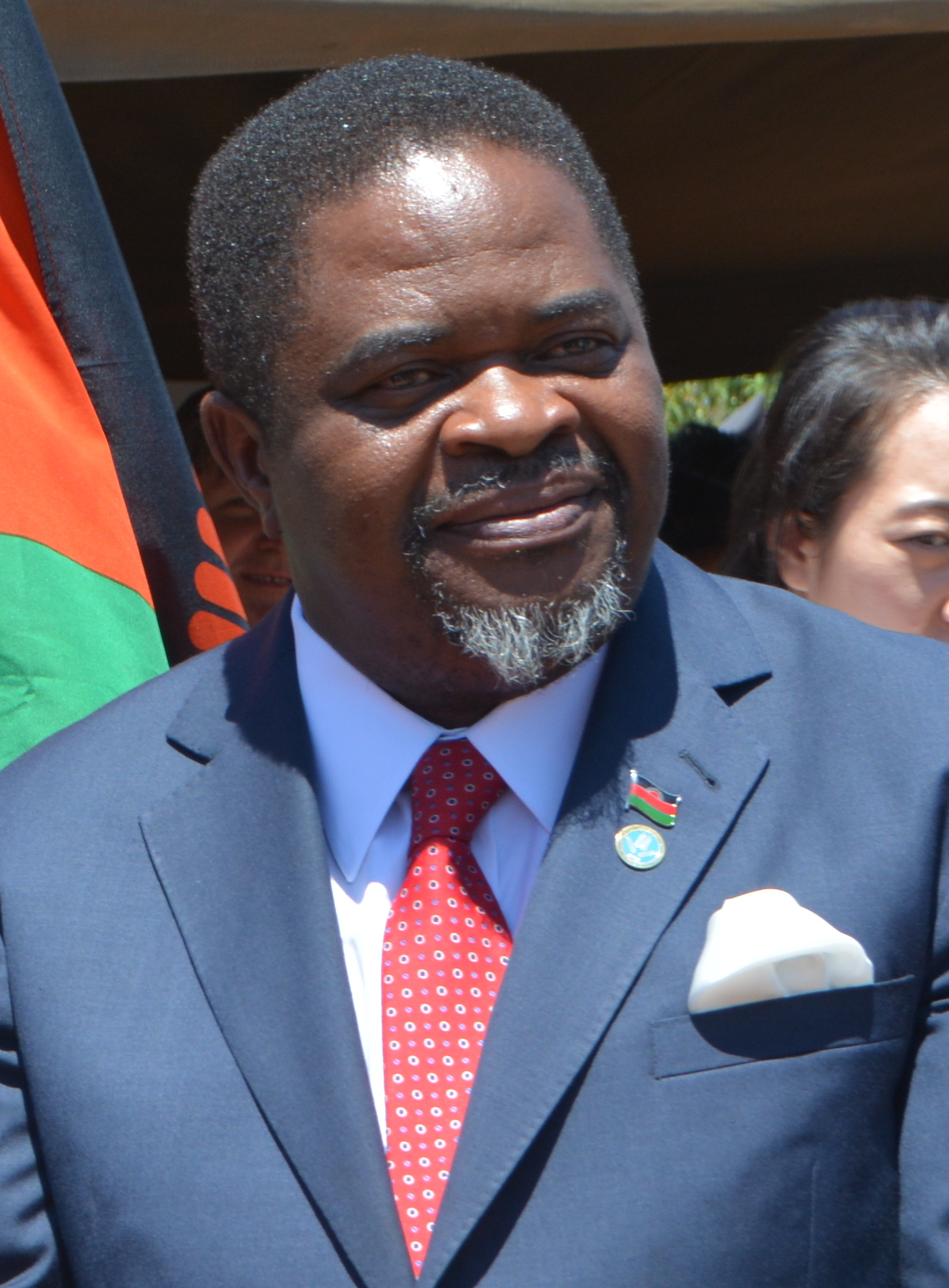

Minister of Lands, Housing and Urban Development of Malawi
- In office 19 June 2014 – April 2015
- President: Peter Mutharika

Personal details
- Born: Malawi
- Party: Democratic Progressive Party (Malawi)

Bright Msaka is a Malawian politician and educator. He has been Minister of Natural Resources, Energy and Mining and the Minister of Justice. In 2025 he became the Minister of Education who introduced free secondary education after he succeeded Madalitso Wirima Kambauwa.

== Life ==
He was born 4 October 1959. Between 2000 and 2003 he was ambassador to Portugal, Sweden, Norway, Denmark, Finland and Iceland. He was appointed as the Minister of Lands, Housing and Urban Development, having been appointed to the position in 2014 by former president of Malawi Peter Mutharika. His term began on 23 June 2014. He served in that capacity until April 2015. From April 2015 to 2017 he was the Minister of Natural Resources, Energy and Mining.

He stood for election in 2019 in the Machinga – Likwenu constituency replacing Mwalone Jangiya who stood aside and recommended Msaka. He was appointed as Minister of Justice from June 2019 to June 2020.

He lost his seat in the 2025 election. However he became the Minister of Education and he announced the introduction of universal free secondary education. In the following year he commended Malawi University of Business and Applied Sciences (MUBAS) and its vice chancellor Nancy Chitera for their ambitious plans. The plans included assembling and making agricultural equipment, making lime, cement and gold mining.

Awards and achievements
Preceded by	Minister of Lands, Housing and Urban Development of Malawi	Succeeded by
