= Nancy Chitera =

Malawian academic

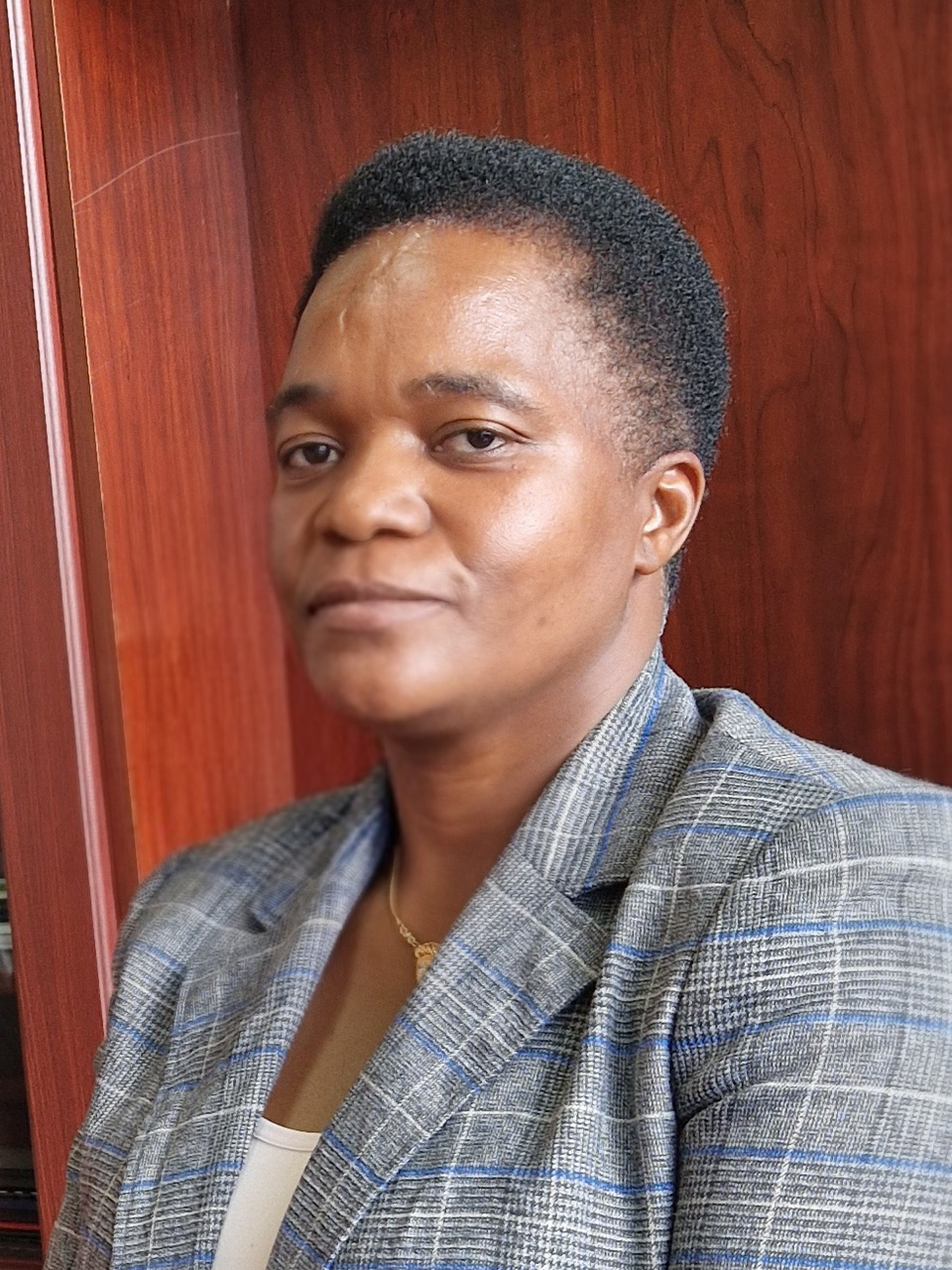
- Chitera in 2026
- Education: University of Malawi, University of Witwatersrand
- Occupation: Vice-chancellor
- Employer: MUBAS

Nancy Chitera is a Malawian academic who became the vice chancellor of Malawi University of Business and Applied Sciences.

== Life ==
Chitera has a bachelor's degree in teaching science together with a master's degree in maths science and a doctorate in the education of mathematics. Her first degrees were obtained from the University of Malawi and her PhD was from the University of Witwatersrand.

The President of Malawi approved her to be Malawi University of Business and Applied Sciences (MUBAS)'s acting vice-chancellor in 2021, until a more substantive candidate could be found.

At the beginning of 2022 MUBAS faced a crisis when it was feared that over 300 students might have to leave because they could not pay their fees. Chitera was able to announce that the fees would be covered by a large donation by the First Capital Bank.

Six universities from Malawi have a close relationship with Scotland. In January 2023 she and the five other vice-chancellors addressed the Scottish Parliament's relevant committee. In 2024 she was in Glasgow with Glasgow's Lord Provost and the Scotland Malawi Partnership's Further and Higher Education committee.

In 2024 she was at her university's first graduation ceremony of their first class to receive degrees. The President of Malawi Lazarus Chakwera, who was the university's chancellor, attended.

In 2026 she announced that MUBAS had invested 5 billion kwacha in order that the university could start to build agricultural equipment. It is planned to build tractors at their stand alone company. MUBAS also has interests in mining. They have a company who intend to manufacture cement and lime and to enter the gold mining business.
