= Ralph Kasambara =

Malawian lawyer (1969–2024)

Raphael Kasambara

President & Chairman of the Malawi Law Society
- In office 2003–2004
- Preceded by: John Katsala
- Succeeded by: Charles Mhango

Attorney General of Malawi
- In office 2004–2006
- Succeeded by: Jane Ansah

Minister of Justice and Attorney General
- In office 2012–2013
- Preceded by: Ephraim Mganda Chiume
- Succeeded by: Anthony Kamanga

Personal details
- Born: Raphael Kasambara; 26 September 1969 Nkhata Bay, Malawi
- Died: 7 June 2024 (aged 54) Lilongwe, Malawi
- Spouse: Margaret Namizinga
- Occupation: Lawyer, politician
- Known for: Malawian lawyer, Minister of Justice, Attorney General of Malawi, President of the Malawi Law Society
- Nickname: Ralph

Raphael Kasambara (26 September 1969 – 7 June 2024) was a Malawian lawyer, jurist, academic and convicted criminal who served as the Minister of Justice and Attorney General. He served twice as Attorney General under the administration of Presidents Bingu wa Mutharika and Joyce Banda, before being removed from office following allegations of involvement in the 2013 Malawi Capital Hill Cashgate Scandal. He was convicted and sentenced to 13 years in jail in 2016 for conspiracy to murder a civil servant and had been on bail at the time of his death.

== Early life ==
Kasambara was born in Nkhata Bay on 26 September 1969.

== Career ==
Kasambara was a law teacher at Chancellor College, University of Malawi. He served as president and chairman of the Malawi Law Society from 2003 to 2004. He was an Attorney General under Bingu wa Mutharika's first administration. He later became the lawyer for Joyce Banda who was being sidelined by the Mutharika administration. He was also the lawyer of Zambian President Michael Sata.

On 26 April 2012, President Joyce Banda appointed Kasambara as minister of justice and attorney general. On 10 October, a few days after returning from a trip to the UN, Banda sacked her cabinet and replaced Kasambara with Fahad Assani in the new cabinet, which was announced on 15 October 2013.

== Arrests and conviction ==
Kasambara became a vocal critic of President Mutharika's administration, advocating for his impeachment and commenting that he "wants to be a dictator". Kasambara was arrested on 14 February 2012 after a group of would-be arsonists went to his offices with petrol bombs and were subdued by him and his supporters. When they called the police, the police arrested him and five others on charges of 'kidnapping' and 'torturing' the three men. He was taken to jail, released on bail, and re-arrested for a 'fraudulent bail process'.

On 8 November 2013, Kasambara was arrested on suspicion of involvement in the September shooting of whistleblower Paul Mphwiyo following the Capital Hill Cashgate Scandal. He was subsequently denied bail, but later released on bail. He was rearrested on money laundering charges on 27 January 2014.

On 21 July 2016, he was convicted by the High Court for conspiring to murder Paul Mphwiyo. On 30 August 2016, he was given a 13-year jail term for conspiracy to murder a civil servant, in a crime believed to be linked to a multi-million dollar corruption ring.

== Death ==
Kasambara was found dead at a lodge in the Lilongwe suburb of Area 47 in Malawi, on the evening of 7 June 2024. He was 54. Preliminary results of an autopsy showed that he had died due to heart failure. The police report noted that "different types of drugs and alcohol" were found in the same room where his body was discovered. His funeral was held on 10 June 2024 in the Northern Region, during which an aircraft carrying Vice President Saulos Chilima and nine others crashed on their way to attend the ceremony, killing everyone on board.

== Publications ==
- "Civic Education in Malawi Since 1992: An Appraisal", in Kings M. Phiri and Kenneth R. Ross, Democratisation in Malawi: A Stocktaking (book), Kacehere Publishing – 1998
- The Legal Regime for Foreign Direct Investment in Malawi (article), UNIMA Students Law Journal – 2000
