= Bryan Clieve Roberts =

British lawyer

Sir Bryan Clieve Roberts KCMG, QC (22 March 1923 – 6 December 1996) was a British lawyer, civil servant and colonial administrator.

== Biography ==
Born in Southsea, Hampshire, Brian Roberts attended Whitgift School in Croydon and Magdalen College, Oxford. During the Second World War he was commissioned into the Royal Artillery and Royal Horse Artillery and served in France, the Netherlands, Belgium and Germany.

Roberts returned to civilian life in 1946 and was called to the Bar as a member of Gray's Inn in 1950. He entered the chambers of Viscount Hailsham, and thereafter had a spell in the Treasury Solicitor's Department before joining the Colonial legal service in 1953. He was appointed as Crown Counsel in Northern Rhodesia and rose to become Director of Public Prosecutions.

In 1960, Roberts was appointed attorney general of Nyasaland and would play an important role in the transition to independence and formation of the new Malawi state. In 1961 he was appointed Queen's Counsel for the Federation of Rhodesia and Nyasaland. He is particularly noted for helping to establish the legal profession in the newly independent state, and laying the foundations of legal training in the country. Between 1965 and 1972 Roberts was also at various times Permanent Secretary to the Office of the President, Secretary to the Cabinet, and Head of the Malawi Civil Service whilst also chairing the Malawi Army Council, the National Security and Intelligence Council, and the National Development and Planning Council. He concurrently held the offices of Attorney-General and Secretary for Justice from July 1965 to May 1972.

Roberts returned to Britain in 1972 and was knighted the following year. In later life, he became Secretary of Commissions for the lay magistracy, was appointed metropolitan stipendary magistrate and served as Chairman of the Commonwealth Magistrates' and Judges' Association.

Brian Roberts died in London on 6 December 1996 and is buried at Kensal Green Cemetery.
