= Society of Malawi, Historical and Scientific =

Organization

Society of Malawi
- Predecessor: The Nyasaland Society
- Merged into: 1964
- Purpose: To promote interest in literary, historical and scientific matters that relate to Malawi, as well as to discover and record facts and information about Malawi which might otherwise be lost.
- Products: Malawi Society bi-annual journal
- Key people: Patron: President of Malawi

The Society of Malawi, Historical and Scientific is a not-for-profit organisation established in 1946, as the Nyasaland Society. It changed its name after Malawi gained independence in 1964. The society aims to promote interest in literary, historical and scientific matters, discover and record facts and information about Malawi. It also acquires books relating to Malawi. The patron of the library is the president of Malawi.

== Programmes ==
The society publishes a journal twice yearly. The journal, called The Society of Malawi Journal since 1965, and formerly The Nyasaland Journal, is edited by David Stuart-Mogg. Stuart-Mogg is an amateur historian and Fellow of the Royal Geographical Society.

It also has a reference library and archives located at the historic Mandala House, Malawi's oldest standing building in Blantyre, built in 1882. The library is open to both the public and society members.

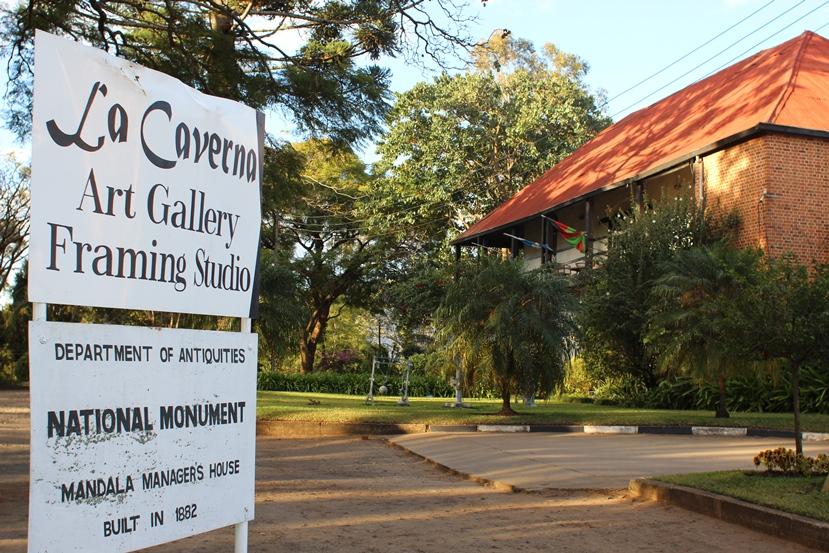
Mandala Manager's House, Malawi's oldest building

== The Transport Museum at the Heritage Centre, Blantyre ==
The society also runs a transport museum, located in the Heritage Centre in Limbe on land granted by the Malawi Railways with the proviso that the history of transport in Malawi be preserved with emphasis on the railways' role in opening up Nyasaland, a landlocked country, to the sea. Exhibits at the museum cover the period from 1867 to 1996 and include fully captioned photographs, artifacts, and other items of interest.

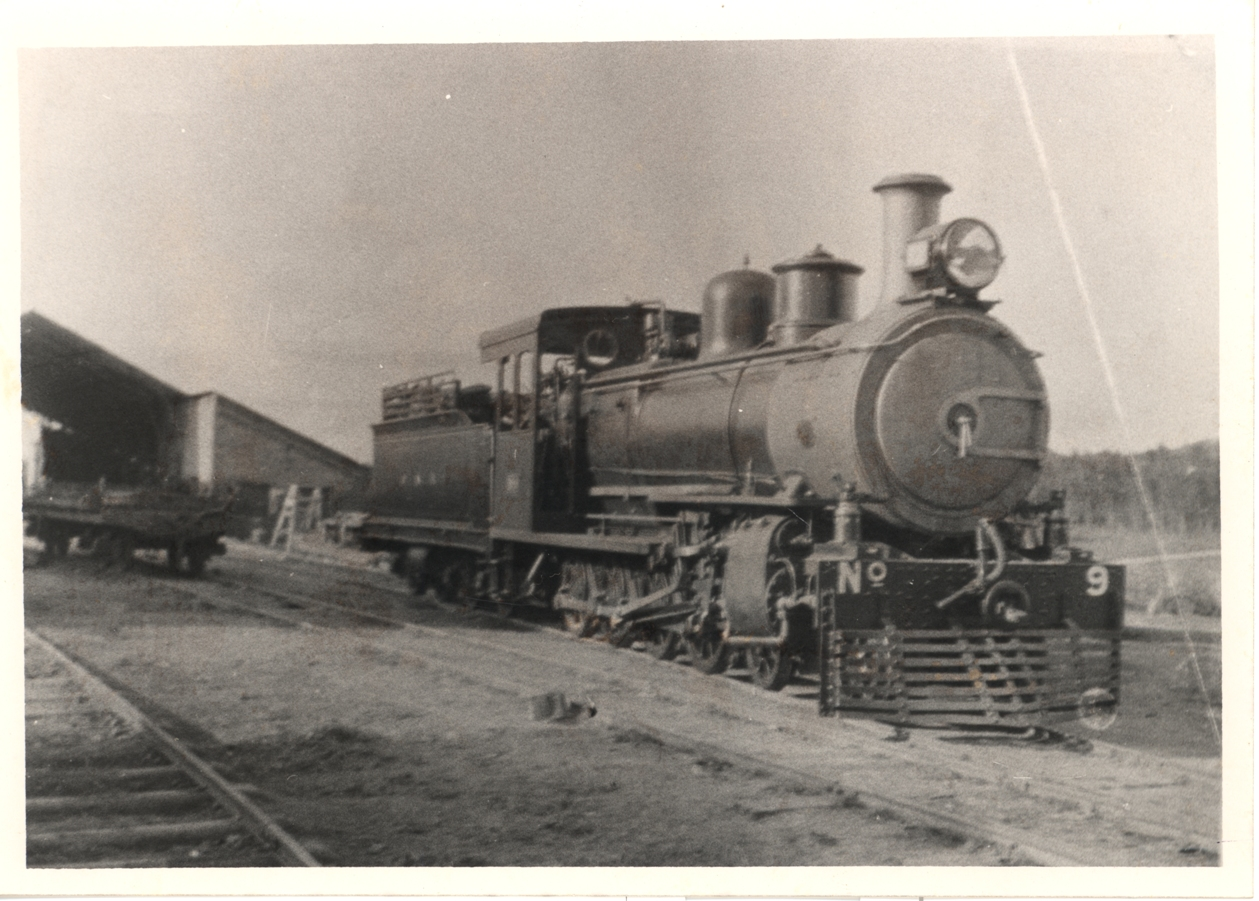
Locomotive Number 9 at Limbe, May 1924
