= David Rubadiri =

Malawian diplomat and academic (1930–2018)

- Born: James David Ribadiri; 19 July 1930; Liuli, British Tanganyika
- Died: 15 September 2018 (aged 88); Mzuzu, Malawi
- Citizenship: Malawian
- Education: King's College, Budo; Makerere University; University of Bristol; King's College, Cambridge
- Occupations: Diplomat, academic and writer
- Spouse: Gertrude Rubadiri

James David Rubadiri (19 July 1930 – 15 September 2018), known as David Rubadiri, was a Malawian diplomat, academic, poet, playwright, and novelist.

Considered one of the most celebrated East African poets to emerge after independence, he served as Malawi’s first ambassador to the United States and the United Nations before spending decades in exile teaching at various universities. He returned to Malawi in 1994 and was reappointed ambassador to the United Nations before becoming Vice Chancellor of the University of Malawi.

== Life ==
Rubadiri was born on 19 July 1930 at Liuli, on the Tanganyika shore of Lake Nyasa (now Lake Malawi). His parents were Malawian, and his father worked as a teacher and in the colonial civil service. Rubadiri spent his early childhood in Tanganyika but grew up and attended school in Nyasaland (now Malawi).

From 1941 to 1950, he attended King's College, Budo, a prestigious school in Uganda established to train the sons of kings and chiefs. At Budo, he was a contemporary of the poet Okot p’Bitek. Following secondary school, he spent a year (1950–1951) at the Domasi Teacher Training School near Zomba.

Rubadiri attended Makerere University College in Kampala, Uganda, from 1952 to 1956, where he studied English Literature and History. He graduated with a First Class Honours BA. During his time at Makerere, he was elected President of the Students' Union, a role that allowed him to travel to Turkey and Germany. It was at Makerere that he met Jomo Kenyatta, an encounter that inspired Rubadiri to take an active role in politics.

After graduating from Makerere, Rubadiri studied for a Diploma in Education at the University of Bristol. He returned to Nyasaland around 1957 to teach History and English at Dedza Secondary School. On 14 September 1957, he married Gertrude Mabel Olive Rubadiri (née Uzanda), a fellow teacher. They went on to have five children together.

Rubadiri became increasingly involved in the nationalist movement against colonial rule. While teaching at Dedza, he clashed with colonial authorities after organizing a student meeting addressed by the nationalist leader Hastings Banda. As a result, he was transferred to Blantyre to serve as an Education Officer.

During the Nyasaland emergency on 1959, Rubadiri and his wife Gertrude were arrested as part of Operation Sunrise. He was detained at Khami Prison in Bulawayo (in present-day Zimbabwe), where he organised classes for fellow prisoners in English, History, Latin, and Science. Upon his release, he was known as a "Prison Graduate". He subsequently won a scholarship to King's College, Cambridge, where he completed an MA in English Literature between 1960 and 1962. Following his studies, he became the Principal of Soche Hill College in Limbe.

During his time at Soche Hill College, he reflected on his early life and education:

...for quite a number of us who have in many parts grown up, grown up not in the African traditional village, but have been uprooted as youngsters and grown up in missions and gone to mission schools and have come face to face with the power that the white man yielded as a governor, have had to come to a time when you feel you’ve got to feel the ground under your feet and try to start growing roots, as it were, to reach towards something which will nourish what one is keeping in the head.

When Malawi gained independence in 1964, President Hastings Banda appointed Rubadiri as the country's first Ambassador to the United States and the United Nations. However, his tenure was short-lived. Following the 1964 Cabinet Crisis and a growing ideological rift with Banda, Rubadiri resigned his post in 1965.

Rubadiri fled the county with the assistance of Paul Theroux. He accepted a teaching position at Makerere University, where he worked in the Extra-Mural Department and as a senior lecturer between 1968 and 1975. During this period, he also served as President of the Association for Commonwealth Literature and Language Studies. During his time in Uganda, he married his second wife, Janet, a nurse, with whom he had four children.

The rise of Idi Amin's dictatorship in Uganda forced Rubadiri and his family to flee to Kenya, where Rubadiri taught at the University of Nairobi until 1985. During his time in Kenya, he served on the Executive Committee of the National Theatre. Subsequently, he moved to Botswana, serving as Professor of Education and Dean of the Department of Languages and Social Science Education at the University of Botswana from 1984 until the mid-1990s.

During an interview in 1986 in Gabarone, Rubadiri reflected on his years away from Malawi:

My home is in Malawi. I was born there, and all my values in life, all my vices and virtues, are Malawian. Still, I'm grateful that through my experiences, through accidents of history and of time and place, I have been made to understand what it is to be an African and a full human being. Because if I had not had that chance and also shared it with my children by moving from one country of this contintent to another, we all, by sheer accident, would have been denied this larger knowledge of ourselves as part of the family of mankind. I would have remained a flag Malawian if this issue of principles had not arisen. But I am glad I am more than that today—I am a Malawian beyond a flag Malawian.

Following the end of Hastings Banda's rule and the transition to multi-party democracy in Malawi, Rubadiri returned home. President Bakili Muluzi appointed him as Malawi's Permanent Representative to the United Nations. He served in this capacity until 2000.

In 2000, he was named Vice-Chancellor of the University of Malawi, a position he held until his retirement in 2005. In 2005, he received an honorary doctorate from the University of Strathclyde.

James David Rubadiri died on 15 September 2018 in Mzuzu, Malawi.

== Literary work ==
David Rubadiri is widely considered a pioneer of creative writing in East Africa, although he is not well known outside the continent. While his writing career spanned poetry, the novel, and drama, he is best known for his verse. An early poem, Stanley Meets Mutesa, first appeared in an anthology in the late 1950s, and then again in Langston Hughes' Poems from Black Africa. It has become one of the most anthologized in collections of African poetry, and was one of three of Rubadiri's poems to appear in Origin East Africa, an early entry into the Heinemann African Writers Series. His verse also appeared regularly in journals include Transition and Black Orpheus while elsewhere he played a siignficant role as an editor and anthologist.

David Rubadiri's creative output was most diverse during the 1960s, producing and acting in Othello, writing his own drama, Come to Tea, which was broadcast on the BBC World Service, and publishing his only novel, No Bride Price. No Bride Price was published in 1967 and drew on the author's experiences as a diplomat and political activist. It tells the story of a young civil servant, Lombe, whose life, and that of his lover, are turned upside-down by a coup.

In his review of the novel, Okot p'Bitek concludes:

Rubadiri handles his characters with love and care. They are all very real as are their human situations. Written in simple sentences No Bride Price makes engrossing reading. The short chapters compel you to go on and on, and when you come to the end you want more. The title, like the grim picture of the soldier on the cover, have little to do with the contents of this first novel, but the East African Publishing House must be congratulated on bringing out yet another attractive book.

Rubadiri's poetry continued to appear in anthologies in the 1970s and 1980s, and in 2004 his own collection of poems, An African Thunderstorm and other Poems, appeared.

== Published works ==
=== Novels ===
- Rubadiri, David (1967). No Bride Price. Nairobi: East African Publishing House.

=== Poetry collections ===
- Rubadiri, David (2004). An African Thunderstorm & Other Poems. Poets of Africa. Vol. 17. Nairobi: East African Educational Publishers.

=== Edited poetry anthologies ===
- Rutherfoord, Peggy, ed. (1958). Darkness And Light: An Anthology Of African Writing. London: Faith Press.
- Hughes, Langston, ed. (1963). Poems from Black Africa. Bloomington: Indiana University Press.
- Cook, David, ed. (1965). Origin East Africa: A Makerere Anthology. London: Heinemann Educational Books.
- Okola, Lennard, ed. (1967). Drum Beat: East African Poems. Modern African Library. Nairobi: East African Publishing House.
- Sergeant, Howard, ed. (1970). Pergamon Poets 2: Poetry from Africa. Oxford: Pergamon Press.
- Cook, David; Rubadiri, David, eds. (1971). Poems from East Africa. African Writers Series. Vol. 96. London: Heinemann Educational.
- Fraser, Robert (1975). Reading African Poetry: An Introduction for Schools. London: Collins.
- Kariara, Jonathan; Kitonga, Ellen (1976). An Introduction to East African Poetry. Nairobi: Oxford University Press.
- Blackburn, Dougal; Horsfall, Alfred; Wanjala, Chris, eds. (1978). Attachments to the Sun. London: Edward Arnold.
- Rubadiri, David, ed. (1989). Growing Up with Poetry: An Anthology for Secondary Schools. Oxford: Heinemann.

=== Poems ===
- Rubadiri, David (1964). "On Parting from a First `White' Love". Transition (12): 32.
- — (1965). "A Smile". Transition (20): 24.
- — (1965). "Tears". Transition (20): 24.
- — (1966). "An African Thunderstorm". Présence Africaine. Nouvelle série (57): 338.
- — (1966). "A negro labourer in Liverpool". Présence Africaine. Nouvelle série (57): 337.
- — (1967). "On meeting a West African Boat Train at Waterloo Station". Black Orpheus (21): 37.
- — (1967). "Thoughts After Work". Black Orpheus (21): 38.
- — (1967). "Black Child". Black Orpheus (21): 38.
- — (1968). "Christopher Okigbo". Transition (35): 46.

=== Plays ===
- Rubadiri, David (1965). "Come to Tea". The New African. 4 (5). London: Gransight Holdings Ltd: 106–107.

=== Essays ===
- Rubadiri, David (1963). "Seven African Writers by Moore Gerald London, Oxford University Press, 1962. Pp. 108. 4s". The Journal of Modern African Studies. 1 (3): 419–420.
- — (1964). "Why African Literature?". Transition (15): 39–42.
- — (1964). "Africa: An African Evaluation". The Annals of the American Academy of Political and Social Science. 354 (1): 84–90.
- — (1965). "Makerere Revisited (A Symposium on Goldthorpe's Book)". Makerere Journal (11): 8–9.
- — (1968). "The Theme of National Identity in East African Writing". In Goodwin, K. L. (ed.). National Identity: Papers Delivered at the Commonwealth Literature Conference, Brisbane, 1968. Heinemann Educational Books. pp. 51–56.
- — (1971). "The Development of Writing in East Africa". In Heywood, Christopher (ed.). Perspectives on African Literature. Heinemann Educational Books. pp. 148–156.
- — (1982). "David Rubadiri Interviews Okot p'Bitek". Ife Studies in African Literature and the Arts (ISALA). 1: 18–36.

== Sources ==
- Benson, Eugene; Conolly, L.W. (2005). Encyclopedia of Post-Colonial Literatures in English. Abingdon: Routledge.
- "Dr Henrik Larsson, a model footballer". The Herald. Glasgow. 5 May 2005.
- Gikandi, Simon (2006). "Preface: Modernism in the World". Modernism/modernity. 13 (3): 419–424.
- Gikandi, Simon (2009). The Routledge Encyclopedia of African Literature. London: Routledge.
- Herdeck, Donald E. (1973). African Authors: A Companion to Black African Writing. Volume 1: 1300-1973. Washington D.C.: Black Orpheus Press.
- Jahn, Janheinz (1972). Who's Who in African Literature. Tübingen: Horst Erdmann Verlag.
- Killam, G.D. (1973). African Writers on African Writing. Evanston: Northwestern University Press.
- Lindfors, Bernth (2002). Africa Talks Back: Interviews with Anglophone African Authors. Trenton: Africa World Press.
- Lwanda, John Chipembere (2018). "James David Rubadiri". The Society of Malawi Journal. 71 (2): 46–53.
- "Malawian diplomat and poet David Rubadiri dies". Daily Nation. Nairobi. 15 September 2018.
- Mapanje, Jack (1989). "Censoring the African poem". Index on Censorship. 18 (9): 7–11.
- Mphande, Lupenga (1996). "Dr. Hastings Kamuzu Banda and the Malawi Writers Group: The (un)Making of a Cultural Tradition". Research in African Literatures. 27 (1): 80–101.
- p'Bitek, Okot (1967). "No Bride Price by David Rubadiri". Transition. 32: 61–62.
- Theroux, Paul (2003). Dark Star Safari: Overland from Cairo to Cape Town. Boston: Houghton Mifflin.
- Segal, Ronald (1961). Political Africa: A Who's who of Personalities and Parties. New York: Praeger.
- Vail, Leroy; White, Landeg (1990). "Of chameleons and paramount chiefs: the case of the Malawian poet Jack Mapanje". Review of African Political Economy. 17 (48): 26–49.
- Wright, Laurence (1990). "Aspects of Shakespeare in Post-Colonial Africa". Shakespeare in Southern Africa. 4: 31–50.
- Zell, Hans M.; Silver, Helene (1971). A Reader's Guide to African Literature. New York: Africana Publishing Corporation.
