= Malawi–United States relations =

- Malawi: United States

Diplomatic mission
- Embassy of Malawi, Washington D.C.: United States Embassy, Lilongwe

The United States established diplomatic relations with Malawi in 1964 after Malawi gained independence from the United Kingdom. Malawi's transition from a one-party state to a multi-party democracy significantly strengthened the already cordial U.S. relationship with Malawi. Significant numbers of Malawians study in the United States. The United States has an active Peace Corps program, Centers for Disease Control and Prevention, Department of Health and Human Services, and an Agency for International Development (USAID) mission in Malawi. Both countries have a common history and English language, as they were part of the British Empire.

U.S. and Malawian views on the necessity of economic and political stability in southern Africa generally coincide. Through a pragmatic assessment of its own national interests and foreign policy objectives, Malawi advocates peaceful solutions to the region's problems through negotiation. Malawi works to achieve these objectives in the United Nations, COMESA, and SADC. Malawi is the first southern African country to receive peacekeeping training under the U.S.-sponsored African Crisis Response Force Initiative (ACRI) and has joined the successor program, African Contingency Operations Training Assistance (ACOTA). It has an active slate of peacetime engagement military-to-military programs. The two countries maintain a continuing dialogue through diplomatic representatives and periodic visits by senior officials.

In July 2011, the United States suspended direct aid funding. The US government agency responsible, the Millennium Challenge Corporation, suspended aid because it was 'deeply upset' by the deaths of the 19 people during the July protests.

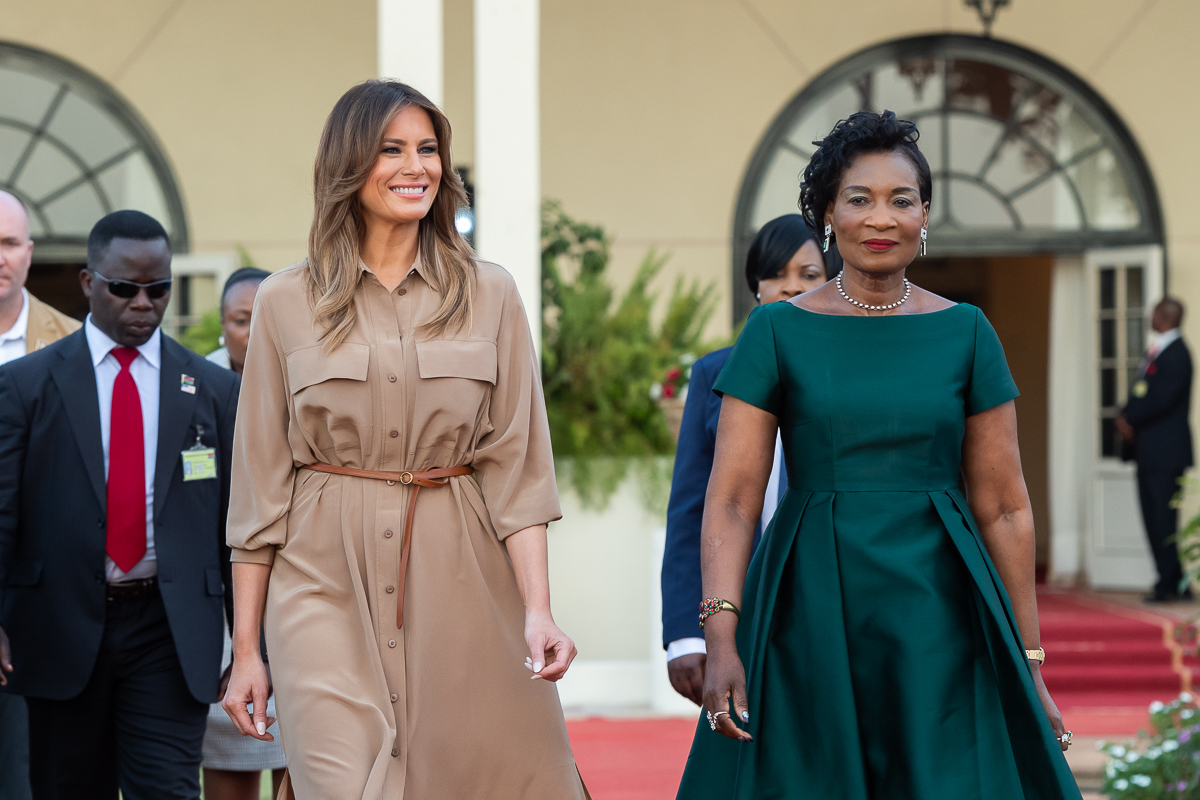
U.S. First Lady Melania Trump and Malawi First Lady Gertrude Mutharika meet at the Malawi State House in Lilongwe.

According to the 2012 U.S. Global Leadership Report, 60% of Malawians approve of U.S. leadership, with 25% disapproving and 15% uncertain.

== U.S. Agency for International Development (USAID) in Malawi ==
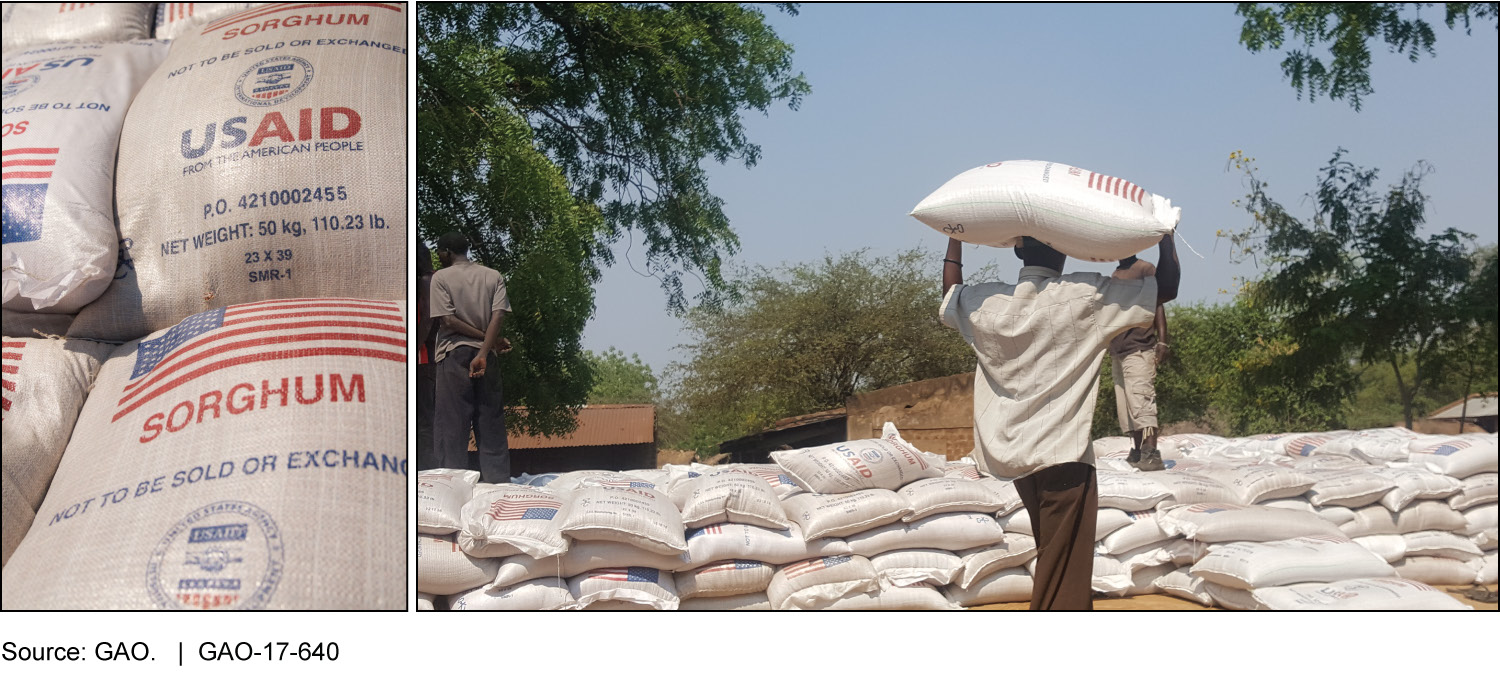
USAID food assistance in Malawi

The United States has a substantial foreign assistance program in Malawi, with the U.S. Government providing approximately $70 million annually in development assistance to Malawi under USAID's Country Strategic Plan (CSP). The primary goal of USAID assistance is poverty reduction and increased food security through broad-based, market-led economic growth, focusing on four areas: sustainable increases in rural incomes, increased civic involvement in the rule of law, improved access to and quality of health services, and improved access to quality basic education. The USAID program is implemented in partnership with the Government of Malawi, nongovernmental organizations (NGOs), other U.S. Government agencies, U.S. private voluntary organizations, contractors, and other partners, including the private sector through public-private partnerships.

USAID's program to increase rural incomes includes training and technical assistance to increase smallholder (crop, dairy, forest, and fishery) productivity; foster additional trade linkages among small farmer producer associations, larger commodity-specific industry clusters, and export markets (e.g. cassava, chilies, groundnuts, cotton, coffee, etc.); improve access to demand-driven financial services for micro, small and medium-sized enterprises (MSMEs); increase rural households' revenues from sustainable natural resource management, and improve food security for vulnerable families in Malawi's rural areas. USAID is also encouraging smallholders to diversify into dairy production, a very lucrative business in Malawi and well-suited to Malawi's limited land area. USAID grantee Land O' Lakes (LOL), partnering with World Wide Sires, continues to promote the growth of the dairy industry in Malawi through 55 dairy associations with over 6,376 members (46% of which are women). USAID, through the Presidential Initiative to End Hunger in Africa, improved output markets for a total of 177,468 rural households. USAID-supported microfinance institutions provided financial services to 189,782 clients and disbursed 351,319 loans valued at $35,876,401. U.S. Government funding totaling $700,000 was leveraged to provide up to $13 million in agricultural financing through Malawi's first Development Credit Authority (DCA).

The Democracy and Governance portfolio continued to evolve in 2007, which proved to be an important transition year for the MCC Threshold Country Program (TCP). Activities under the TCP reaped positive results in fighting corruption, improving fiscal responsibility, and establishing a more transparent and effective judiciary. Partly as a result of successes gained under the TCP, the Government of Malawi was the only country in the world selected by MCC in December 2007 for Compact eligibility. Several other Democracy and Governance activities continued to fight corruption in the private sector, educate at-risk youth of their civic responsibilities, and nurture Christian/Muslim dialogue and relationships. The Democracy and Governance office also initiated a public-private partnership with the Financial Services Volunteer Corps to assist the Reserve Bank of Malawi and private banks to further develop risk-based banking supervision capacity. Chancellor College and a U.S.-based Historically Black College/University (HBCU) also entered into a partnership to strengthen the government's legal aid programs.

As was the case in previous years, USAID continued to support the Sector Wide Approach to Health (SWAP) in 2007 through discrete initiatives aimed at "increased use of improved health behaviors and services" for maternal, child, and reproductive health, including HIV/AIDS, tuberculosis, and malaria. These sustained efforts over the last 7 years have had a substantial impact on health indicators in the country. In the area of HIV prevention, for example, the number of USAID-assisted counseling and testing centers increased from 3 in 2000 to 276 in 2007, while the number of clients assisted at these sites per year increased from about 22,000 in 2000 to more than 192,000 in 2007. In addition, according to a national Demographic and Health Survey (DHS) completed in 2005 with support from USAID, USAID's Presidential Emergency Plan for HIV/AIDS Relief activities reached 1,351,404 people through ABC messages (abstinence from sexual activity, being faithful to a single partner, and correct and consistent condom use) and provided care to 57,356 HIV/AIDS orphans and vulnerable children. Under-five mortality rates declined from a high of 189 per thousand live births in 2000 to 133 per thousand live births in 2004; the total fertility rate (TFR) declined to 6 children per woman, and the proportion of Malawian children sleeping under an insecticide-treated bed nets (ITN) (26% in 2004) was more than three times the proportion (8%) sleeping under an ITN in 2000. Key achievements in 2007 under the Presidential Malaria Initiative (PMI) included: the distribution of 185,400 long-lasting insecticide-treated mosquito nets and 2,607,480 doses of a new life-saving drug delivered nationwide.

Improving the quality and efficiency of basic education remain the major development challenges in the Malawi education system. USAID continues to fund activities that target quality of and access to the primary education sub-sector level, which is having a positive effect at both the local and national levels. At the local level, USAID-funded activities are helping communities and parents make more informed decisions to improve the quality of primary schooling. In 2007, USAID continued its efforts in the education sector through (1) development of teachers' professional skills through long-term undergraduate and graduate training in Malawi and the U.S.; (2) reinforcement of innovative classroom practices through pre-service and in-service teacher training; (3) participation of communities and teacher training colleges in HIV/AIDS outreach activities; (4) support of Government of Malawi adoption of key policy reforms in teacher education and HIV/AIDS; and (5) improving the quality and quantity of data available for policymaking. In 2007, USAID, through the African Education Initiative (AEI) and congressionally mandated School Fees Initiative (SFI), improved the quality of and access to primary education for 624,032 children and enhanced the pedagogical skills of 10,355 teachers.

The United States is the largest contributor to the World Food Program (WFP) in Malawi, providing over $100 million in food and other emergency assistance through WFP since early 2002. USAID will coordinate requests to the U.S. Government for humanitarian assistance, and WFP will handle the logistics of import and distribution.

== Centers for Disease Control and Prevention in Malawi ==
The Centers for Disease Control and Prevention (CDC), Department of Health and Human Services (DHHS) operates two programs within Malawi: Global AIDS Program (GAP) and Malawi Malaria Program (MMP).

The CDC GAP office started in November 2001 with an emphasis on establishing long-term working relationships with the Malawi Government, the National AIDS Commission (NAC), and the Ministry of Health (MOH). The major areas of focus during the initial phase included strengthening Voluntary counseling and testing (VCT), HIV surveillance, evaluation, infrastructure, and capacity-building activities.

GAP Malawi supports multiple HIV surveillance activities including sentinel surveillance and the Priorities for Local AIDS Control Efforts (PLACE) survey. In partnership with NAC, CDC GAP continued to strengthen VCT, developing multiple national VCT building blocks such as VCT Guidelines and VCT Training materials. CDC GAP also improved the communications and data analysis capacity at NAC by helping to establish their computer system and establish the foundation for data analysis.

The CDC MMP is jointly funded by USAID and CDC has evolved to provide more support to the national prevention and control program. CDC MMP has supported the work of the National Malaria Control Programme in developing the country strategic plan for Roll Back Malaria (RBM), developing the national "Malaria Policy," developing guidelines for the management of ITNs Program, and participating in other national program activities.

The Blantyre Integrated Malaria Initiative (BIMI), a program of CDC MMP, is a district-wide malaria-control effort, supported jointly by the Government of Malawi, the United States Agency for International Development (USAID), and the Centers for Disease Control and Prevention (CDC). BIMI was established in Blantyre District, Malawi in 1998 to promote sustainable and effective strategies to manage and prevent malaria-related morbidity and mortality.

Initial BIMI efforts focused on the measurement of baseline data at health facilities and in the community. The information gathered was used to identify gaps in malaria control activities, to guide strategies for implementation of interventions, and to provide baseline measurements so that the success of program interventions can be monitored.

== Peace Corps in Malawi ==
The first Peace Corps volunteers arrived in Malawi in 1963. Under the conservative Banda regime, the program was suspended for several years due to the "nonconformist" role of some volunteers but was restored in 1978. Since that time, the program has developed a close working relationship with the Government of Malawi. In total, over 2,200 Americans have served as Peace Corps volunteers in Malawi.

The change of government in 1994 allowed the placement of volunteers at the community level for the first time. With the increased flexibility in programming, the Peace Corps began working to refocus programming in areas more appropriate for Peace Corps intervention at the community level. Currently, there are about 100 volunteers working in health, education, and the environment.

Health volunteers work in AIDS education, orphan care, home-based care, youth and at-risk groups, child survival activities, nutrition, disease prevention, environmental health, and women's health issues. For many years, Peace Corps/Malawi had the only stand-alone HIV/AIDS project in the Peace Corps, and HIV/AIDS continues to be the cornerstone for health activities.

Education volunteers teach in the fields of physical science, mathematics, biology, and English at Community Day Secondary Schools (CDSSs), generally community-started and -supported entities.

Environment volunteers focus on community-based management of natural resources with border communities near national parks and forest reserves that want to utilize their resources in a more sustainable manner. This includes the promotion of sustainable agricultural practices, income-generating activities, and agroforestry interventions.

The Crisis Corps program utilizes returned volunteers in short-term assignments for specific projects related to HIV/AIDS and food security. Crisis Corps volunteers are generally assigned with a local NGO to assist with activities that build capacity and develop materials within the organizations.

== Malawian Diaspora in the United States of America ==
Malawi has contributed to the U.S. in terms of human capital, including an educated Malawian diaspora that has contributed towards the workforce. Historically, Malawian migration to the U.S. has been slow but there is a growing population of Malawian Americans and Malawians living in the U.S. They are mainly academics, small business owners, and laborers contributing to the U.S. economy at a variety of levels. Malawian immigrants to the U.S. are also amongst the most highly educated immigrant group in the country. Africans in general rank amongst the most educated group in the country, and amongst this group, Malawians are in the top 5 Approximately, 83% reported having received a high school diploma.

Malawians living in the United States of America have started to form organizations in United States that promote Malawian culture and educate the U.S. public about Malawi and Malawian culture. Many of these organizations provide support philanthropy and support charities in doing work in Malawi as well as support charities doing work in the United States. These organizations can be found in Washington D.C, Texas, Indiana, and the New England States. The longest-serving organization for the Malawian diaspora in the Americas has been the Malawi Washington Association, a non-ethnic, non-religious, non-regional, and non-political organization which has helped to preserve Malawian identity in the diaspora and promoted Malawian culture in the United States.

Malawi also supplies raw materials to the United States. The U.S. goods trade deficit with Malawi was $57 million in 2019.

== Principal Officials ==
=== Principal U.S Officials ===
- Deputy Chief of Mission / Chargé d'affaires ad interim — Amy W. Diaz
- USAID Mission Director—Curt Reintsma
- Peace Corps Director—Dale Mosier
- Centers for Disease Control Director—Austin Demby

=== Principal Malawi Officials ===
- Ambassador to Permanent Mission to the United Nations - Brian Bowler
- Ambassador to Washington DC - Steve Matenje

== Embassies ==
- The U.S. Embassy in Malawi is situated in the diplomatic enclave adjacent to Lilongwe's City Center section.
- The U.S. Embassy is building its office next to Golden Peacock Shopping Mall.
- The Malawian Embassy in the U.S. is located in Washington, D.C.
