= Anneline Kanthambi =

Malawian high court judge

- Born: 1974 (age 51–52)
- Education: University of Malawi, University of Zimbabwe
- Occupation: High Court Judge
- Organization: Judiciary of Malawi

Anneline Kanthambi is a Malawian judge of the High Court of Malawi, appointed in October 2020. She sits in the court's Financial Crimes Division, where she has presided over several high-profile fraud and corruption proceedings, and has sat on constitutional panels of the High Court.

== Appointment ==
In October 2020, President Lazarus Chakwera appointed twelve new judges of the High Court of Malawi, among them Kanthambi. Half of those appointed were women,the five other women appointees were Agnes Patemba, Violet Chipao, Maureen Kondowe, Vikochi Chima and Charlotte Wezi Mesikano. The appointments were announced in a statement signed by the Deputy Secretary to the President and Cabinet, Janet Banda, with immediate effect.

== Early career and education ==
Kanthambi holds a Bachelor of Education (Humanities) awarded in 1997 and a Bachelor of Laws (Honours) awarded in 2006 from the University of Malawi. She also holds a masters degree in women's law from the University of Zimbabwe awarded in 2010.

Before joining the Judiciary Kanthambi worked in the Ministry of Education. She joined the Judiciary as a senior resident magistrate in 2006, later serving as assistant registrar and deputy chairperson of the Industrial Relations Court. She was appointed a judge of the High Court on 20 October 2020. She has served on the Judiciary's Internal Procurement and Disposal Committee, which carries out statutory functions under the Public Procurement and Disposal of Public Assets Act of 2017.

== Judicial career ==
Kanthambi took over the prosecution of a long-running bank fraud case involving former directors of Cotton Ginners Africa Limited with allegations that four commercial banks were defrauded of more than 20 billion Malawian Kwacha. She was assigned to the case in succession of Sylvester Kalembera, who was promoted to the Malawi Supreme Court of Appeal in June 2022. Kanthambi issued fresh directions in the matter in 2024.

In November 2024, Kanthambi dismissed applications by Norman Chisale, formerly bodyguard to President Peter Mutharika, who sought to challenge a state application to forfeit his assets and to stay proceedings on appeal.

She addressed God's Grace Academy in Blantyre where she encourage people and children to share their problems with a trusted person. She said that bottling things up caused stress, smoking, drinking and bad behaviour and that boys in particular needed to realise that they did not need to "be a man" all the time.

In 2026, Kanthambi was the judge in the Financial Crimes Division hearing a judicial review matter brought by three senior lawyers (Kamudoni Nyasulu, George Liwimbi and Enock Chibwana) challenging the discontinuation of several corruption prosecutions and the terminations of their contracts as special prosecutors. In May 2026 she allowed six people, among them the Minister of Finance Joseph Mwanamveka to join the proceedings as interested parties.

== Constitutional Court ==
Kanthambi sat with John Chirwa and Chimwemwe Kamowa on the three-judge panel of the High Court sitting as a Constitutional Court that heard a challenge to the criminalisation of begging, brought by thirteen people with disabilities who had been convicted under Section 180(b) of the Penal Code in 2017. The applicants, represented by the Centre for Human Rights, Education, Advice and Advocacy (CHREAA) and the Southern African Litigation Centre (SALC) argued that the provision was overly broad and breached constitutional rights to dignity, economic activity and freedom from discrimination. The panel heard the case in January 2026 and ruled in April 2026 that begging was not a protected economic activity and that the provision did not breach the Constitution.
