= Necton Mhura =

Malawian academic, diplomat, and politician (1957–2018)

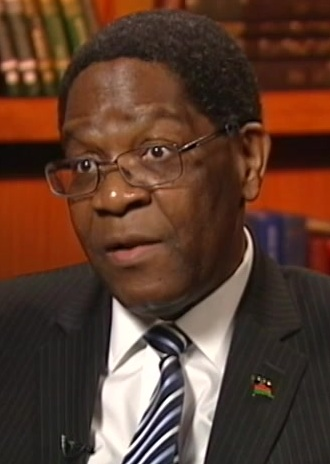
- Necton D. Mhura, ambassador of Malawi to the United States

Permanent Representative of Malawi to the United Nations
- In office September 9, 2016 – February 19, 2018
- Preceded by: Brian Bowler
- Succeeded by: TBD

Malawian Ambassador to the United States
- In office September 9, 2016 – February 19, 2018
- Preceded by: Steve Dick Tennyson Matenje
- Succeeded by: Edward Yakobe Sawerengera

Personal details
- Born: 1957 Malawi
- Died: February 19, 2018 (age 61) New Brunswick, New Jersey, United States

Necton Darlington Mhura (1957 – February 19, 2018) was a Malawian academic, diplomat and politician. He served as Malawi's Ambassador to the United States, with dual accreditation to Canada and Mexico, from May 2015 to September 2016 and the Permanent Representative of Malawi to the United Nations from 2016 until his death in office on February 19, 2018.

== Biography ==
Mhura received his Bachelor of Laws from the University of Malawi and his Master of Laws from the University of London. He joined the University of Edinburgh as a research fellow from 1985 until 1988.

=== Career ===
Mhura taught as a law lecturer at Malawi Polytechnic from 1995 until 1998. He then served as the head of department of law at the University of Malawi from 1996 until 2002, acting Dean of the university from 1997 until 2000, and Dean of the Faculty of Law at University of Malawi, Chancellor College, from 2004 until 2007.

He was appointed as the national Commissioner of Lands for the Malawi's Ministry of Lands, Housing and Urban Development from 2009 to 2010 and the Deputy Chief Secretary to the Government of Malawi from 2010 until 2012. He practiced law from 2012 until 2015, when he was appointed Ambassador to the United States.

=== Ambassador to the United States ===
Necton Mhura served as Ambassador to the United States from May 2015 until September 2016. He concurrently served as the non-resident High Commissioner to Canada and the Bahamas, as well as the non-resident Ambassador to Cuba and Mexico. He was appointed Ambassador to the United States on May 18, 2015.

=== Permanent Representative to the United Nations ===
In September 2016, Mhura was appointed Permanent Representative of Malawi to the United Nations. He presented his credentials to United Nations Secretary-General Ban Ki-moon on September 9, 2016. He remained in the position until his death on February 19, 2018.

Necton Mhura died of complications from cancer at Robert Wood Johnson University Hospital in New Brunswick, New Jersey, on February 19, 2018, at the age of 61. He was survived by his wife and three children. A memorial service was held in Yonkers, New York, before his body was flown to Malawi. Mhura was buried in the city of Zomba, Malawi, on March 1, 2018.
