= Charlotte Wezi Malonda =

Charlotte Wezi M. Malonda
- Born: Charlotte Wezi Mesikano; December 2, 1979 (age 46)
- Education: University of Malawi LLB (Hons.), Loyola University Chicago LLM, University of Zimbabwe Masters in Women's Law, Lund University Pg Dip, King's College London Pg Dip
- Occupation: Judge of the High Court of Malawi (Commercial Division)
- Employer: Judiciary of Malawi
- Known for: CEO of the Competition and Fair Trading Commission

Charlotte Wezi Malonda or Charlote Wezi Malonda (born December 2, 1979) is a Malawian High Court judge who led the Competition and Fair Trading Commission for seven years.

== Early life and education ==
Malonda was born in 1979. Malonda graduated with a Bachelor of Laws (Hons) from the University of Malawi in 2002. She went on to a postgraduate diploma in women's and children's rights at Lund University (2004), a master's degree in women's law at the University of Zimbabwe (2006),a postgraduate diploma in European Competition Law at King's College London (2013) and a Master of Laws in global competition law at Loyola University Chicago.

== Early career ==
She worked in the Ministry of Justice and Constitutional Affairs, where she served as a legal aid advocate and later as Principal Administrator General, before becoming the Chief Legal Officer in the Office of the Ombudsman in Malawi. In 2012 she became Chief Executive of the Competition and Fair Trading Commission. There was only one other woman at the time leading an African competition agency. By 2015 the Commission was rated the best-performing statutory commission.

The Competition and Fair Trading Commission did not have the funds that Malonda considered important. The workload had more than doubled, but the budget had not increased in proportion. She resigned in 2019 after serving for seven years. Her law firm is called Charlotte Thomas and Company and she is a member of Malawi's Women Lawyers Association. Malonda sat as a Commissioner on the COMESA Competition Commission.

== Judicial career ==
Malonda's appointment to the High Court took effect on 20 October 2020. Malonda was one of six women who were promoted to be high court judges. The others were Maureen Kondowe, Anneline Kanthambi; Agnes Patemba, Vikochi Chima and Violet Chipao. The appointment was lauded by feminists because half of the appointees were women. President Chakwera also promoted Ivy Kamanga and Healey Potani at the same time to be Supreme Court judges.

In 2025 Malonda sat on a three-judge panel of the High Court, sitting as the Constitutional Court in Blantyre, alongside judges Justus Kishindo and Bruno Kalemba, to hear former vice-president Cassim Chilumpha's application for a permanent stay of the treason prosecution brought against him in 2006. At a scheduling conference in April 2025 Malonda set the timetable for the hearing. Chilumpha argues that his case should have been dealt with in a reasonable time, but the state argues that 20 years is still reasonable. The panel heard oral argument in July 2025.

== Other activities ==
Malonda is a member of the Women Judges Association of Malawi and Canon Collins Trust scholar, registered for a PhD in gender studies at the University of Cape Town on Malawian women working as engineers in power stations.

== Writing ==
In 2016, Malonda contributed a chapter to the edited volume Women in Politics in Malawi, arguing that a well-designed gender quota was a possible route to more balanced representation of women in Malawian Politics. The contributor note to the same book records that she had served on the executive of the Women Lawyers Association, revised the Malawi Police human rights training manual, and co-authored reports on women and HIV and on women in state custody.
