= Maureen Kondowe =

- Born: 1 April 1973 (age 53)
- Education: University of Malawi & the University of Essex
- Occupation: High Court judge
- Spouse: Shyley Sinya Kondowe
- Children: Nthangwanika Kondowe, Asante Jordan Kondowe

Maureen Kondowe (born 1 April 1973) became a Malawian high court judge in 2020.

== Life ==
Kondowe was born in 1973. She graduated in law at the University of Malawi in 1996. She studied International Trade Law and she obtained a master's degree from the University of Essex in 2000.

She married a Shyley Sinya Kondowe who was a business person. In 1999 they had a daughter named Nthangwanika Kondowe and she would become associated with Hip Hop music.

She was a member of the Pan African Lawyers Union (PALU) and in 2014 she became one of its vice-presidents. Elijah Chola was the President and they served until 2017.

In 2016 the United Nations Environment Programme was featuring her work in support of the Paris Agreement. She was arguing that the agreement was a key part of the support that Africa might expect to mitigate climate change and it was important that the agreement was upheld.

In 2020, President Chakwera came to power thanks to judges who over turned a previous national election. Several judges were promoted and Kondowe was one of six women who were promoted to be high court judges at the Kamuzu Palace. The appointment was lauded by feminists like Emma Kaliya and Maggie Kathewera Banda because half of the appointees were women.The others were Agnes Patemba, Anneline Kanthambi; Violet Chipao, Vikochi Chima and Charlotte Wezi Malonda.

Kondowe wrote "An Analysis of the Electoral Legal Environment for the 2013 Zimbabwean Harmonized Elections" in 2013 and she contributed to "In Search of Justice: Women and the Administration of Law in Malawi" which was published in 2000.
