= Agnes Patemba =

Malawian high court judge and diplomat

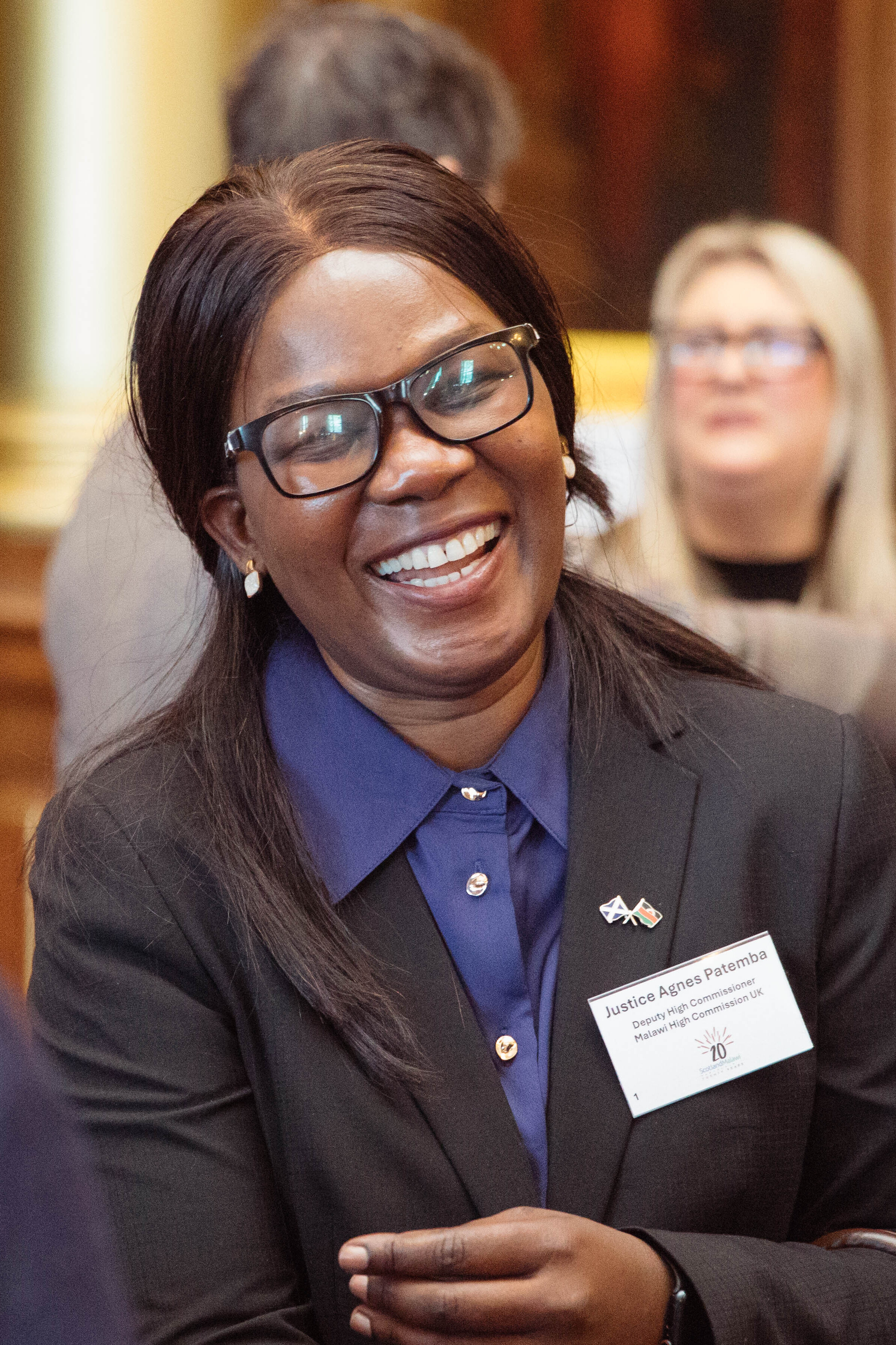
- At an SMP event in 2026 (By Kirsty Stroma)
- Born: January 13, 1975 (age 51); Malawi
- Other name: Thokozani Agnes Patemba
- Education: Chancellor College; University of Zimbabwe
- Occupations: high court judge and diplomat
- Known for: Deputy High Commissioner in the United Kingdom
- Children: 2

Thokozani Agnes Patemba (born 1975) is a Malawian high court judge and diplomat. She became a high court judge in 2020 and Malawi's deputy High Commissioner in the United Kingdom in 2021.

== Life ==
Patemba was born on 13 January 1975 and she grew up in Kawale township, Lilongwe. She was the second eldest, and she had three brothers and four sisters. She made money by selling paraffin, sweet potatoes and sugar cane and she attended Likuni Girls' Secondary School before studying humanities at Chancellor College in Zomba. In 2004, she graduated with a law degree, as she had switched from humanities.

Her legal career began on 29 December 2004 when she was appointed a Senior Resident Magistrate. She worked in the Lilongwe courts before she was transferred to the High Court in Mzuzu in 2005. In 2009, she moved to an industrial relations court and in 2014, she was awarded a masters degree from the University of Zimbabwe. In 2015, she became a magistrate and in 2017, she became a deputy registrar of both the High Court and the Supreme Court of Appeal, and a Malawi Judiciary registrar. She succeeded Jack N’riva as Registrar.

In 2019, five judges overturned the result of the 2019 Malawian general election. They decided that fresh elections were required. They gave their verdict after arriving in bulletproof vests. The judges were applauded in the British parliament as this was the first overturning of a Presidential election in Africa (and only the second time an election had been re-run). Patemba was in charge of the court and its COVID-19 restrictions when the appeal was rejected in May 2020.

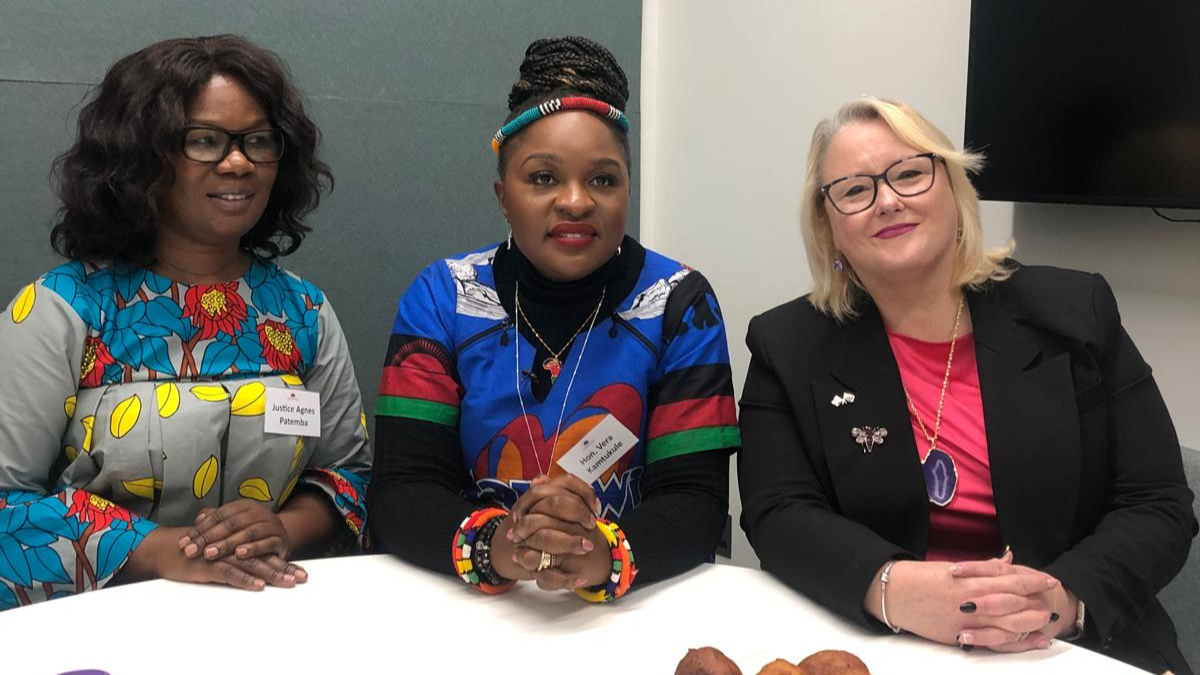
(L-R) Patemba; writer Vera Kamtukule; Christina McKelvie MSP in 2023 in Scotland

Lazarus Chakwera and Saulos Chilima were elected President and vice-President at the new elections and they made a large claim for their legal expenses of about $12m which was disputed. Patemba was asked to arbitrate on the expenses case as the High Court recorder and the eventual figure agreed for legal expenses was about $9m - which still attracted comment.

In 2020, President Chakwera promoted a number of judges, including Ivy Kamanga and Healey Potani, who had been involved in the case that had allowed his election. Patemba was also promoted to be a High Court judge. Her position as Registrar was taken by Gladys Gondwe. Patemba was one of six women who were promoted to be high court judges. The others were Maureen Kondowe, Anneline Kanthambi; Violet Chipao, Vikochi Chima and Charlotte Wezi Malonda. The appointment was lauded by feminists because half of the appointees were women.

Patemba was called Chakwera's "favourite" when she was appointed to be Malawi's deputy High Commissioner in the United Kingdom in 2021 to replace Quent Kalichero. Her appointment to a diplomatic role and that of Justice Esme Chombo was questioned, because of the shortage of judges in Malawi and because the judiciary and the executive are intended to be independent.

When she spoke out about gender based violence in 2022 it was appreciated. She had been involved in a high profile case high court case. She had sentenced five men to serve 67 years of hard labour. She noted that the punishments were allowed by parliament and these sentences were intended to deter others.

== Private life ==
She has two children with Joseph Patemba.
