= Esme Chombo =

Malawian judge and diplomat

Malawian Ambassador to the United States
- In office 2020–current
- Preceded by: Edward Sawerengera

Personal details
- Born: Esme Jynet Chombo Blantyre, Malawi

Esme Jynet Chombo is a Malawian High Court Magistrate who became the Malawian Ambassador to the United States, Canada and Mexico until 2026. She is a champion of women's rights and human rights. She gained attention internationally for ruling against Madonna's second adoption, which opened an international debate about the rights of children, celebrity adoptions and child trafficking in international adoption.

== Career ==
Chombo started her college career in Sierra Leone in 1982 at Fourah Bay College (University of Sierra Leone) where she received a Bachelors of Arts degree in 1986. At the same time she was attending law school at the University of Malawi (Chancellor College), where she graduated in 1986. She joined Malawi's judiciary in 1986 as a Resident Magistrate and later worked as the Chief Magistrate where she oversaw magistrates in the lower courts in the country's Northern Region.

In 1995, she joined the private sector in Malawi, working for the Press Group of Companies. By 1999, she went to England to receive her master's degree in Strategic Management at the University of Derby and graduated in 2001. In 2003, she was appointed as a Judge of the High Court in Malawi where she oversaw all subordinate courts in civil, criminal, administrative, and industrial relations matters.

Justice Chombo presided over some high-profile cases in the country. She was the presiding judge over pop star Madonna's second adoption case for her daughter Chifundo. Chombo denied Madonna the right to adopt a child on the basis of residency clauses in Malawi's adoption laws. Her verdict caused international debate over the rights of children. Madonna successfully appealed Chombo's decision. Chombo later served as the Chairperson of the Malawi Law Commission's Special Law Commission on the Review of the Adoption of Children Act from 2009 – 2012.

She led the ten commissioners who served on the Special Law Commission on Abortion. They reported in 2015 recommending the decriminalisation of abortion. The more legal approach extended the circumstances where abortion could be permitted that included rape and incest. It did not include financial considerations. One of the commissioners Anne Phoya noted that this would be a significant relaxation because Malawi was a poor country so many could use this as justification.

She was the founding President of Malawi's Chapter of the International Association of Women Judges, Women Judges Association of Malawi in 2011. She has served on the board of numerous organizations. She worked as a High Court Justice until being appointed as Malawi's ambassador to the U.S. in 2021. Her appointment to a diplomatic role and that of Agnes Patemba was questioned because of the shortage of judges in Malawi.

In 2023 she organised a two week visit from the "Smiling Surgeons" to Queen Elizabeth Hospital in Lilongwe. They reduced the 200 strong waiting list for facial surgery. There is only one facial and jaw surgeon, Dr James Mchenga, and even that service is short of supporting supplies. Dr. Tania C. Nkungula who is an oral and maxillofacial surgeon leads Smiling Surgeons. to organise 12 doctors and four support staff to fly in. Dr Nkungula was born in Malawi and she works in Washington D.C.

Chombo was one of Malawi's twenty ambassadors and she was also the non-resident ambassador to Mexico and Canada until 2026.

== Personal life ==
She has six children and five of them are adopted.

== Philanthropy ==
She is an honorary board member of the non-profit group Age Africa.
