= Likoma Islands (Malawi Parliament constituency) =

Electoral constituency of the Parliament of Malawi

Likoma Islands is a constituency for the National Assembly of Malawi, located in the Likoma District of Malawi's Northern Region. It elects one Member of Parliament by the first past the post system. The constituency was represented by DPP MP George Kamwanja in 2014.

== Election results ==
Election	Political result	Candidate	Party	Votes	%	±%
Likoma Islands general election, 2014; 191 null & void votes Electorate: 6,933; Turnout: 5,852 (84.41%)	DPP gain from Independent; Majority: 7 (0.12%)	George Johnsen Kamwanja	DPP	1,802	31.12	
Likoma Islands general election, 2014; 191 null & void votes Electorate: 6,933; Turnout: 5,852 (84.41%)	DPP gain from Independent; Majority: 7 (0.12%)	Christopher Ashems Songwe	MCP	1,795	31.00	
Likoma Islands general election, 2014; 191 null & void votes Electorate: 6,933; Turnout: 5,852 (84.41%)	DPP gain from Independent; Majority: 7 (0.12%)	Boma Vincent Chirwa	PP	1,211	20.91	–
Likoma Islands general election, 2014; 191 null & void votes Electorate: 6,933; Turnout: 5,852 (84.41%)	DPP gain from Independent; Majority: 7 (0.12%)	Ada Chris Manda	UDF	538	9.29	–
Likoma Islands general election, 2014; 191 null & void votes Electorate: 6,933; Turnout: 5,852 (84.41%)	DPP gain from Independent; Majority: 7 (0.12%)	Justin Bright Thundu	Independent	445	7.68	–
