= Vikochi Chima =

Judge of the High Court of Malawi
- Incumbent
- Assumed office 20 October 2020
- Appointed by: President Lazarus Chakwera

Personal details
- Born: Vikochi Ndovi; 7 February 1981 (age 45)
- Education: University of Malawi LLB (Hons), University of Cape Town LLM
- Occupation: Judge

Vikochi Ndovi Chima (born 7 February 1981) is a Malawian judge of the High Court of Malawi appointed in October 2020. She sits in the court's Criminal Division and has served on Constitutional Court panels, including the panel that in 2024 upheld the constitutionality of Malawi's laws criminalising same-sex conduct.

== Early life and education ==
Chima was born in 1981. She graduated with a Bachelor of Laws (Honours) from the University of Malawi in 2004 and obtained a Master of Laws in Criminal Justice from the University of Cape Town in 2011.

== Career ==
Chima joined the Judiciary of Malawi in 2005 as a senior resident magistrate. She subsequently served as an assistant registrar of the High Court and Supreme Court of Appeal and as a deputy chairperson of the Industrial Relations Court.

On 20 October 2020, President Lazarus Chakwera, acting on the recommendation of the Judicial Services Commission, appointed Chima a judge of the High Court of Malawi. She was one of twelve new appointees, six of them women. The other five women appointees were Agnes Patemba, Violet Chipao, Anneline Kanthambi, Maureen Kondowe and Charlotte Wezi Malonda. The announcement, signed by the Deputy Secretary to the President and Cabinet, Janet Banda, stated that the appointments took effect immediately.

== Judicial career ==
In October 2021, reviewing a magistrate's acquittal of an 18-year-old charged with the defilement of a 15-year-old girlfriend, Chima upheld the acquittal and wrote that Malawi's defilement law was problematic because it criminalised consensual sexual relations between teenagers close in age. Chima suggested the approach taken in South Africa and elsewhere offered a possible model. In the same judgment, she criticised the magistrates' dramatic and florid style of judgment writing, observing that writing judgments was a solemn responsibility and that judicial officers should avoid personal views, humour or sarcasm in their decision.

In January 2022, sitting at the High Court in Blantyre, Chima sentenced a former police officer to 30 years' imprisonment with hard labour for raping a 17-year-old student who was being held in a police cell in December 2020. The case had been sent to the High Court for sentencing because the Magistrates' Court considered the appropriate sentence to exceed its jurisdiction. The prosecution included Chikondi Chijozi, and a youth movement led by Tisungane Sitima had campaigned for the case to b expedited.

In November 2021, Chima sat on a three-judge Constitutional Court panel with Judges Joseph Chigona and Mandala Mambulasa; she ruled that a constitutional challenge to Malawi's laws against same-sex conduct raised issues of constitutional importance and should proceed rather than be struck out. After Judge Mambulasa recused himself in April 2023, the panel was reconstituted with Chigona and Chimbizgani Kacheche. In 2024, the panel dismissed the application by Jana Gonani and Juan Wilem Akster, ruling that the relevant provisions of the Penal Code were constitutional and that the applicants' remedy lay in lobbying Parliament to change the law; the decision was criticized by Human Rights Watch.

== See also ==
- LGBTQ rights in Malawi
- Women Judges Association of Malawi (WOJAM)
