= Kazima =

Kazima may refer to:

- Kazma, an area in Kuwait
- Kazima Dam, part of the water supply system in Tabora, Tanzania
- Kazima Tako, fictional character in British children's television series The Story of Tracy Beaker and The Dumping Ground
- Mercy Kazima, Malawian professor of mathematics education
