= Gladys Gondwe =

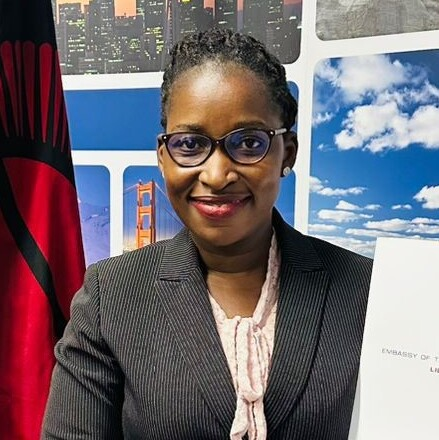
- at the US Embassy in Lilongwe
- Born: 31 January 1984 (age 42)
- Education: University of Malawi, Pepperdine University
- Occupation: Judge
- Known for: High Court Judge
- Predecessor: Agnes Patemba

Gladys Assima Gondwe is a Malawian former Registrar of the High Court and Supreme Court of Appeal. Since 2022 She has been a High Court Judge. She organised the ceremony when members of the Malawian judiciary were awarded the Chatham House Prize.

== Life ==
Gondwe was born in 1984. She graduated in law in 2008 from the University of Malawi.

In 2019, five judges overturned the result of the 2019 Malawian general election. They decided that fresh elections were required.

In 2021 the Chatham House Prize was presented to five members of the Malawian judiciary who had overturned the 2019 national election. The presentation was delayed for a year by the COVID-19 pandemic and exceptionally the award was made in Malawi. Gondwe as registrar was the Master of Ceremonies at the event.

In February 2022 President Lazarus Chakwera appointed a number of new high court judges which included Gondwe, Rosemary Kayira and Gloria Namonde. Honor Kondwani Banda became the acting Registrar. In May she was posted to the High Court in Mzuzu to oversee their criminal cases.

She was awarded a Fulbright scholarship to study at Pepperdine University and in June 2025 she graduated with awards for being a top student. She was presented with a Master LLM degree in International Commercial Arbitration.
