= Chipao =

Chipao can refer to:

- Chipao District, district of Lucanas Province, Peru
- Qipao, type of Chinese dress
- Violet Chipao (born 1981), Malawian judge
