= Tisungane Sitima =

- Born: September 7, 1998 (age 28)
- Citizenship: Malawi
- Known for: Youth Sexual and Reproductive Rights

Tisungane Chimwemwe Sitima is a Malawian young woman activist working on the sexual and reproductive health rights of youth. Sitima studied gender and development program at the Lilongwe University of Agriculture and Natural Resources in Malawi. Sitima has served as a member of the Johns Hopkins Global Youth Advisory Board and a member of the Global Early Adolescent Study (GEAS Malawi).

== Public speaking and activism ==
Tisungane Sitima has participated as a panelist on these webinars "Very Young Adolescents: Leveraging a Key Life Stage to Improve SRH" and also "Ethics in Research and Programming with Adolescents: Capturing the Perspectives of International Organisations". Sitima has advocated for the Termination of Pregnancy Bill in Malawi as part of a youth-led call for abortion law reform. Sitima engages with community members and young people about gender based violence. In 2021, Sitima led a youth movement that was protesting the sexual abuse of minors; the movement petitioned the judiciary to revoke the bail granted to a police officer accused of raping a girl. Sitima petitioned the Inspector General of Police, the Chief Justice and the Director of Public Prosecutions to expedite the hearing and remove the police prosecutor. The Judiciary acknowledged the petition in February 2021. The officer was convicted in July 2021 in a case prosecuted with Chikondi Chijozi and sentenced to 30 years imprisonment with hard labour by Justice Vikochi Chima in January 2022.

== Publications ==
Sitima co-authored a paper on adolescent interventions. Sitima has also co-authored a research paper on the sexual well-being of young people.
