= Hawa Ndilowe =

Malawian civil servant (born 1960)

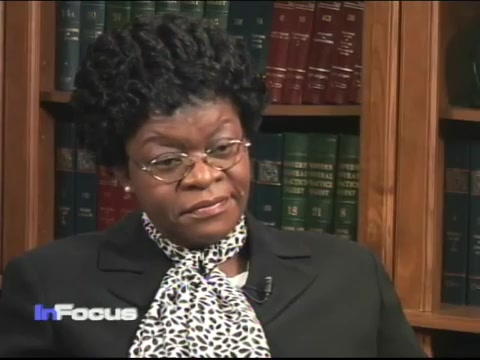
Image of Hawa Ndilowe

Ambassador Hawa Olga Ndilowe (born 1960) is a Malawian civil servant who was Chief Secretary to the government in Malawi. She is a former ambassador to the United States for Malawi. She has received international recognition for championing female education.

== Career ==
She received her bachelor's degree in social science with concentrations in economics and mathematics from the University of Malawi, Chancellor College. After this, she obtained a master's degree in Information Systems from the London School of Economics. She soon worked as an Information Systems Analyst in Malawi, and then as a Permanent Secretary in the public service. She has been a civil servant since 1981. She was the ambassador to the United States for Malawi in 2006 and was accredited for Argentina, Brazil, Canada, Colombia, Cuba and Mexico.

She began working as Principal Secretary for e-Government after her post in Washington, D.C. She was later promoted to Deputy Chief Secretary and later Chief Secretary to the President and Cabinet. In 2013 she made headlines when she started a Facebook page.

In 2014 she was sacked by the President. It was reported that she had organised a foreign trip for Joyce Banda at the government's expense without asking the President.

In 2015 she was appointed Malawi Ambassador to the Republic of Tanzania till December 2017. She was the first woman to hold this position. Ndilowe retired from the civil service in March 2020.

== Personal life ==
Her father, Vanwell Masamba, was a prosperous businessman who owned a fleet of luxury taxis in Blantyre, the commercial capital of Malawi. She has one son and three daughters.
