= List of ambassadors of Malawi to the United States =

Coordinates: 38°54′49″N 77°3′11.4″W

Ambassador of Malawi to the United States Embassy of Malawi in Washington, D.C.
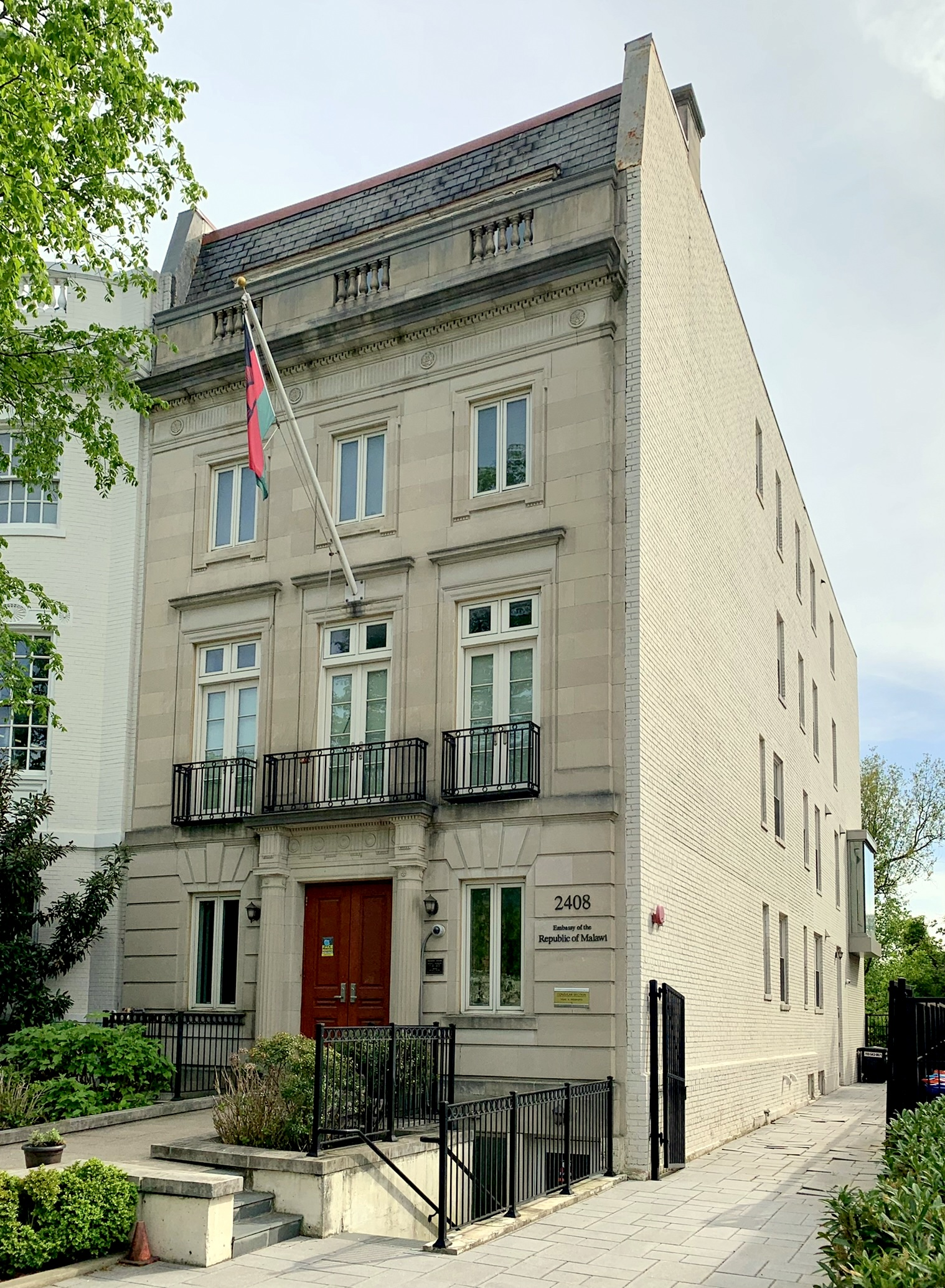
- Inaugural holder: David Rubadiri
- Formation: August 14, 1964

The Malawian ambassador in Washington, D. C. is the official representative of the Government in Lilongwe to the Government of the United States. The Ambassador to the United States also serves concurrently as the non-resident High Commissioner to Canada, High Commissioner to the Bahamas, Ambassador to Cuba, and Ambassador to Mexico.

== List of representatives ==
Diplomatic agrément	Diplomatic accreditation	Ambassador	Observations	List of heads of state of Malawi	List of presidents of the United States	Term end
July 6, 1964			EMBASSY OPENED	Glyn Smallwood Jones	Lyndon B. Johnson	
July 27, 1964	August 14, 1964	David Rubadiri		Glyn Smallwood Jones	Lyndon B. Johnson	
July 14, 1965	July 14, 1965	Vincent H. B. Gondwe	(*1930-1991).	Glyn Smallwood Jones	Lyndon B. Johnson	
September 15, 1967	September 25, 1967	Nyemba Wales Mbekeani		Hastings Banda	Lyndon B. Johnson	
September 13, 1972	November 23, 1972	Gamaliel Petro Bandawe	Recalled to his country for reassignment – NEVER PRESENTED CREDENTIALS	Hastings Banda	Richard Nixon	
June 5, 1973	June 14, 1973	Robert Bernard Mbaya		Hastings Banda	Richard Nixon	
November 10, 1975	November 21, 1975	Jacob Thomson Xander Muwamba	(* 1925—2008)	Hastings Banda	Gerald Ford	
March 22, 1981		Abner L. Mayaya	Chargé d'affaires	Hastings Banda	Ronald Reagan	
April 17, 1981	June 12, 1981	Nelson Thompson Mizere		Hastings Banda	Ronald Reagan	
September 12, 1985	November 5, 1985	Timothy Sam Mangwazu		Hastings Banda	Ronald Reagan	
November 2, 1988	November 9, 1988	Robert B. Mbaya	"(* June 30, 1933, Nkhota Kota, Malawieducated: University of Ghana, public administration studies, Mpemba laboratory assistant, Chitedze, 1957, accounts assistant, "	Hastings Banda	Ronald Reagan	
March 2, 1995	March 20, 1995	Willie Chokani		Bakili Muluzi	Bill Clinton	
January 25, 2000	February 3, 2000	Paul Tony Steven Kandiero		Bakili Muluzi	Bill Clinton	
April 9, 2004	July 15, 2004	Bernardo Sande		Bingu wa Mutharika	George W. Bush	
November 17, 2006	December 8, 2006	Hawa Ndilowe		Bingu wa Mutharika	George W. Bush	
September 14, 2010	September 16, 2010	Steve Dick Tennyson Matenje		Bingu wa Mutharika	Barack Obama	
May 6, 2015	May 18, 2015	Necton Mhura	a lawyer by profession, previously served as a lecturer at the University of Malawi Chancellor College teaching law and as a board member of the Electricity Supply Corporation of Malawi Ltd.	Peter Mutharika	Barack Obama	June 29, 2020
June 29, 2016	May 18, 2021	Edward Yakobe Sawerengera		Peter Mutharika	Donald Trump	June 29, 2020
June 29, 2021		Esme Chombo	a Judge by profession, previously served as a High Court Justice in Malawi.	Lazarus Chakwera	Joe Biden	
