= Paul Kishindo =

Malawian sociologist (1952–2020)

Paul Kishindo (1952 – December 1, 2020) was a Malawian sociologist, professor of Rural Sociology and former Dean of Social Science at University of Malawi Chancellor College Dr. Kishindo is well known in Malawi and internationally for his work on rural sociology in Malawi.

== Career ==
He attended University of Malawi in 1970. He joined the University of Malawi as an Assistant Lecturer in 1978. He became a professor in 1997. He later became the Dean of Social Science at Chancellor College, University of Malawi. He is the author of several journal articles and an editor of a book on rural Malawi

=== Anglican Church Controversy ===
Kishindo was a well-known critic of the abuses of clergy in Malawi. He was ex-communicated from the Anglican church along with 20 others their open criticism over church politics and Bishop Brighton Malasa. A leaked letter was published in the media where Kishindo described Anglican Bishop Brighton Malasa as “juvenile” and “delinquent”.

== Select Bibliography ==
=== Articles ===
- Kishindo, Paul & Mvula, Peter. (2017). Malawi's land problem and potential for rural conflict. Journal of Contemporary African Studies. 35. 1–13. 10.1080/02589001.2017.1342784.
- Kishindo, Paul. (2011). Emerging Reality in Customary Land Tenure: The Case of Kachenga Village in Balaka District, Southern Malawi. African Sociological Review. 14. 10.4314/asr.v14i1.70231.
- Kishindo, Paul. (2009). An Examination of the Major Assumptions in the Design of Malawi's Community Based Rural Land Development Project (CBRLDP). Forum for Development Studies. 36. 329–340. 10.1080/08039410.2009.9666440.
- Kishindo, Paul. (2004). Customary land tenure and the new land policy in Malawi. Journal of Contemporary African Studies. 22. 213–225. 10.1080/cjca0258900042000230023.
- Kishindo, Paul. (2000). Community Project Funding in Malawi under the Malawi Social Action Fund (MASAF) Demand-Driven Approach: Potential for Perpetuating Imbalances in Development. Journal of Social Development in Africa. 15. 10.4314/jsda.v15i1.23850.
- Kishindo, Paul. (1995). Sexual behaviour in the face of risk: The case of bar girls in Malawi's major cities. Health Transition Review. 5. 153–160. 10.2307/40652159.
- Kishindo, Paul. (1988). Farmer clubs and smallholder agricultural development in Malawi. Development Southern Africa. 5. 228–233. 10.1080/03768358808439397.

=== Book ===
- Peter Mvula, Meya Kalindekafe, Paul Kishindo, Erling Berge, Friday Njaya. Towards Defragmenting the Management System of Lake Chilwa Basin, Malawi (Defragmenting African Resource Management (DARMA)

== Personal life ==
He was born in Balaka District, Malawi in Kachenga Village.

He died on December 1, 2020. He is survived by a wife and children, including High Court Judge Justus Kishindo.
