= John Saka =

Malawi academic

Professor John Saka
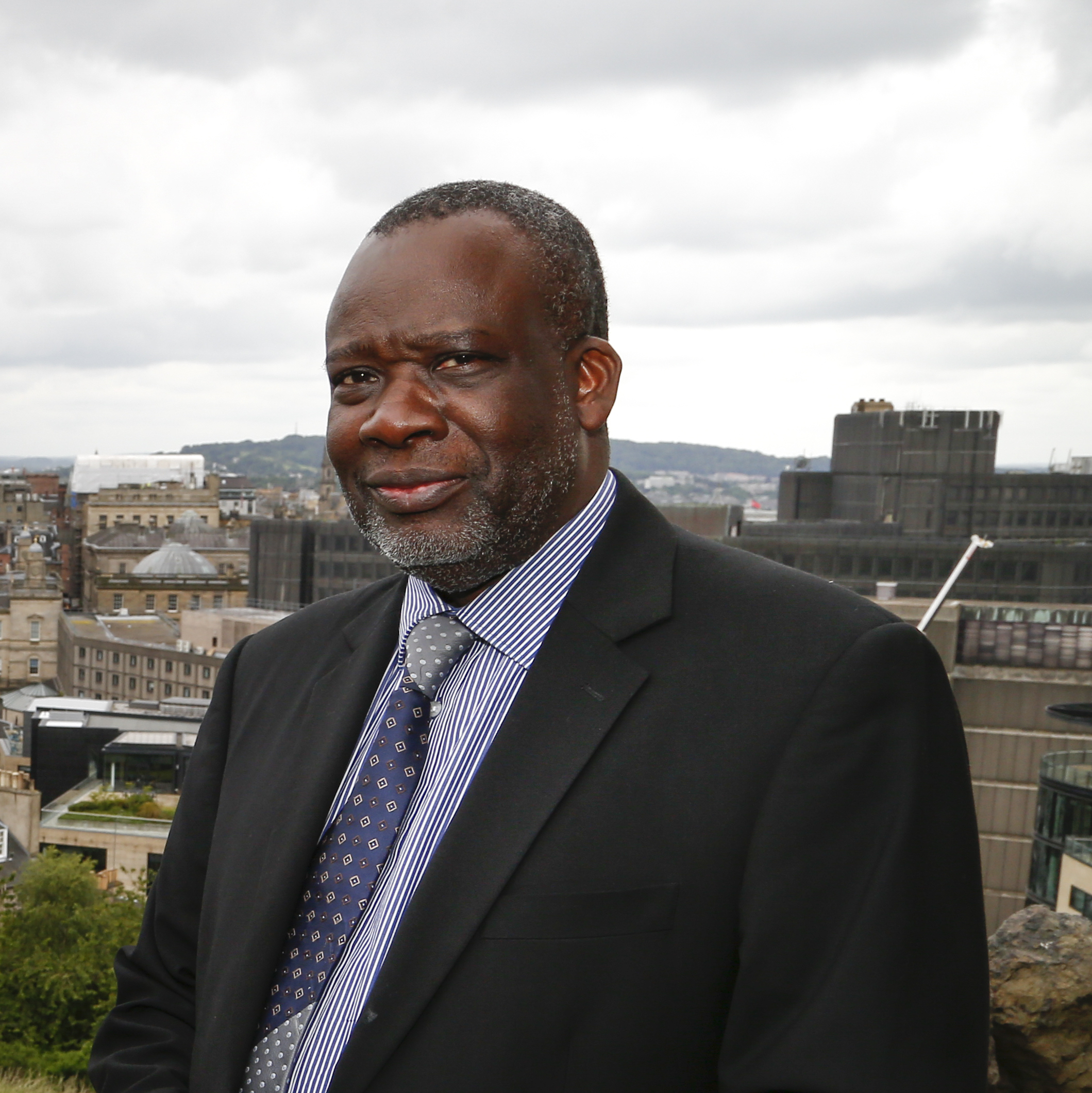
- in 2016

Vice-Chancellor of Mzuzu University
- In office 15 May 2019 – 30 June 2023
- Preceded by: Robert Ridley

Vice-Chancellor of the University of Malawi
- In office 2 December 2013 – 30 June 2019
- Preceded by: Emmanuel Fabiano
- Succeeded by: Mkali Idruss Samson Sajidu

Personal details
- Education: University of Malawi (BSc); University of East Anglia (PhD)
- Profession: Chemist

John Danwell Kalenga Saka served as the Vice-Chancellor of Mzuzu University who replaced Dr.Robert Ridley who withdrew his services in 2017.

Saka was also the former Vice-Chancellor of the University of Malawi who preceded Mkali Idruss Samson Sajidu.

He was born in Malawi and educated at Chancellor College, University of Malawi and the University of East Anglia (PhD, Chemistry). He subsequently became lecturer in Physical Chemistry at the University of Malawi in 1986 where he became a Professor in 2002. He was installed as Vice-Chancellor of the University of Malawi on 2 December 2013. He is also chairperson of the Malawi National Examinations Board.
