= Jane Kambalame =

Jane Ngineriwa Kambalame is Malawi's current High Commissioner to Zimbabwe and Botswana. Prior to this appointment she served in the Malawi mission to the United States of America and Ministry of Foreign Affairs in Malawi.

== Career ==
Ms. Kambalame obtained her bachelor's degree in Public Administration from the University of Malawi. She obtained her master's degree in International Policy and Diplomacy from University of Staffordshire at Stoke-on-Trent. She then entered the Malawi foreign service as a foreign service officer. In 2004, she served as a diplomat in the United States. In 2013, she replaced Dr. Richard Phoya as High Commissioner to Zimbabwe and Botswana.

== Philanthropy ==
She is a strong supporter of NGOs working with women and children in Malawi. Whilst in the United States, she served as a board member of the Malawi Washington Association.

== Human trafficking case ==
In 2016 Kambalame was found liable in a default judgment for human trafficking after having brought a housemaid from Malawi, called Fainess Lipenga. While Kambalame was found liable for this case through a default judgment, Kambalame did not respond to the charges, and therefore their side of the story was never presented or heard in court. This highlights that the judgment was made based solely on the evidence presented against them and there was no due process to ensure all parties have an opportunity to present their case.
