= Chrissie Mughogho =

Malawian diplomat and educator

- Citizenship: Malawi
- Education: Virginia Polytechinic and State University
- Occupation: Academia
- Children: David Kalilani
- Awards: Fulbright Scholar

Dr. Chrissie Chawanje-Mughogho is a Malawian former Ambassador of Malawi to India, Bangladesh, Angola, and Zambia She is a professor by training who rose up the education administration ranks at the University of Malawi. There she served as the first female dean of the faculty of Sciences at the University of Malawi.

Mughogho was born in Chidzinja village in the Tyolo, in the southern region of Malawi. She is mother to musician David Kalilani.

Mughoho was a Fulbright Scholar who graduated from Virginia Polytechinic and State University (Virginia Tech) in 1998 with a PhD in Human Nutrition, Foods, and Exercise. She then moved back to Malawi where she worked in academia at the University of Malawi. She soon rose up the ranks becoming the first dean of applied sciences who was a woman at the university. She also worked as the Chairperson of the Forum for African Women Educationalists in Malawi. She worked there until she took up a diplomatic post in 2005 as Malawi's ambassador to Zambia with concurrent accreditation to Angola. In 2010, she became the High Commissioner of Malawi to India. In 2012 she became Malawi's ambassador to Bangladesh. She returned to Malawi in 2012 and returned to academia.
