= Elson Kambalu =

Malawian artist (born 1972)

- Born: Elson Aaron Kambalu; December 27, 1972 (age 53); Nsanje District, Malawi
- Education: University of Malawi
- Website: https://www.elsonkambalu.com/

Elson Aaron Kambalu is a Malawian artist based in Lilongwe, Malawi. He has been recognised for his storytelling and debate-stimulating works. He is also a curator and a businessperson who owns several art galleries in Malawi. He is widely regarded as one of the most influential figures in the artistic landscape in the Malawi.

== Early life ==
Kambalu was born in December 1972 in Nsanje District, Malawi, to parents Aaron and Jane Kambalu, as a fourth-born child among six siblings. His father was a Clinical officer while his mother was a primary school teacher.

== Education ==
Kambalu graduated with a Bachelor of Business Administration degree from the University of Malawi in 1997, at the age of 25. He also received a postgraduate diploma in Marketing from the Chartered Institute of Marketing in 2003.

== Art career ==
Kambalu is an autodidact artist who began his art career after graduating from the University of Malawi. He started his art career by painting, starting in 1998, whilst employed by several organizations over a seven-year period. In 2005, at the age of 32, Kambalu resigned from his positions to work as a full-time artist. He also pursued art and cultural entrepreneurship by opening a company called Art-House Africa.

His work has been exhibited in several countries around the world. He has been featured on BBC’s Focus on Africa, CNN’s African Voices, and Mnet’s Studio 53.

=== Art galleries ===
Kambalu opened his first art gallery, Kamusu, in 2008. In 2009, Kambalu started a publication called Sons and Daughters Magazine. In 2011, he acquired another gallery, La Galleria Africa. He is also the owner of one Savannah Duty Free Art Space at Kamuzu International Airport.

=== Foreign Bodies, Common Ground exhibition ===
In 2013, Kambalu was one of the international artists featured in the Foreign Bodies, Common Ground exhibition. The exhibition featured artists who, in a six-month residential, worked in medical research centres in Kenya, Malawi, South Africa, Thailand, Vietnam, and the United Kingdom. The artists documented their experiences within the “complex realm that lies between scientific processes and local communities, often on the front lines of communicable diseases.”

While in residence, Kambalu engaged in research regarding medicine. He interacted with local people, notably clinicians and traditional herbalists, to study participants and tribal chiefs. The artists, including Kambalu, expressed and discussed their views regarding medicine research. Kambalu produced artworks which displayed the effects of "the culture and the environment and how they shape attitudes towards healthcare".

== Style and technique ==
Kambalu is a conceptual artist who primarily works in abstract expressionism and installations.

== See also ==
- Kay Chiromo
