= Ian Lockie Michael =

British academic

Ian Lockie Michael (1915–2014) was a British academic who was the founding Vice-Chancellor of the University of Malawi.

== Biography ==
Ian Michael was born in Kelso in Scotland in 1915. After becoming the first Professor of Education at the University of Khartoum, Dr Michael was appointed Vice-Chancellor of the University of Malawi in 1964. In 1973 he became Deputy Director of the University of London Institute of Education before retiring in 1978.

Michael was the author of several books on the teaching of English.

== Collections ==
The Institute of Education (IOE), University College London holds Michael's archive. The archive contains material primarily relating to Michael's vice-chancellorship at the University of Malawi. The IOE also holds a collection of approximately 680 books that belonged to Michael. The books mainly focus on the teaching of English grammar, with works published between 1530 - 1930.
