= Malawian Americans =

Americans of Malawian birth or descent

Malawian American
Total population
- 631 (2000 US census)

Regions with significant populations
- District of Columbia, Indiana, Texas, Washington, Missouri, Georgia, California

Languages
- Chichewa, English

Religion
- Predominantly Christian (chiefly Protestant and Catholic) and Muslim

Malawian Americans are Americans of Malawian descent. According to answers provided to an open-ended question included in the 2000 census, 631 people said that their ancestry or ethnic origin was Malawian.

== Demography ==
The Malawian diaspora mainly consists of academics, small business owners, medical professionals, and laborers. Malawian immigrants to the United States rank in the top five in terms of educational attainment, with 83 percent of Malawians having reported at least a high school diploma or above. Malawians live in cities like Washington, D.C., and Seattle, Washington.

== Home Country Associations ==
Malawians in the U.S. have organized local associations to promote and preserve the Malawian cultural heritage. The Malawi Washington Association, which was organized in 1994 to promote and protect the interests of Malawians residing in the U.S. and Canada, is in the Washington, D.C., metropolitan area. Other organizations include the Friends of Malawi (FOM), which seeks to foster intercultural understanding between Malawians and supporters of FOM and provide small grants for worthy projects in Malawi, and the Malawi Seattle Association (MSA), which focuses on, among other things, promoting deep bonds within the community, supporting MSA members and their families during times of "difficulty and strife", and fostering opportunities for social gatherings.

== Notable people ==
- Upile Chisala, poet
- Masauko Chipembere Jr, musician
- Mwiza Munthali, activist
- Teebs, music producer
- James Thindwa, activist

== See also ==
- Malawian Diaspora
- Malawi - US relations
- Southern Africans in the United States
