= Winford Masanjala =

Malawian Politician

Secretary for Finance and economic planning and development

Associate Professor
- President: Lazarus Chakwera
- Minister: Sosten Gwengwe

Personal details
- Education: University of Malawi, Chancellor College, University of Louisiana
- Profession: Economist

Winford Masanjala is the Secretary for Economic Planning and Development in the government of Malawi. He is also an associate professor at the University of Malawi, Chancellor College.

== Education ==
Winford Masanjala studied for his bachelor's degree in social science at the University of Malawi Chancellor College. He later went to study for his master's degree in Economics and PhD at the University of Loisianna.

== Publications ==
Winford Masanjala published books and articles over the years in his career as an academician. in 2008 he published Rough and lonely road to prosperity: a reexamination of the sources of growth in Africa using Bayesian model averaging, The poverty-HIV/AIDS nexus in Africa: a livelihood approach in 2007, Cash crop liberalization and poverty alleviation in Africa: evidence from Malawi in 2006, The Solow model with CES technology: Nonlinearities and parameter heterogeneity in 2004 and Initial conditions, and post-war growth in sub-Saharan Africa in 2007, and recently in 2018 he published, Tackling Malawi’s medical brain drain.
