= Hazel Miseleni =

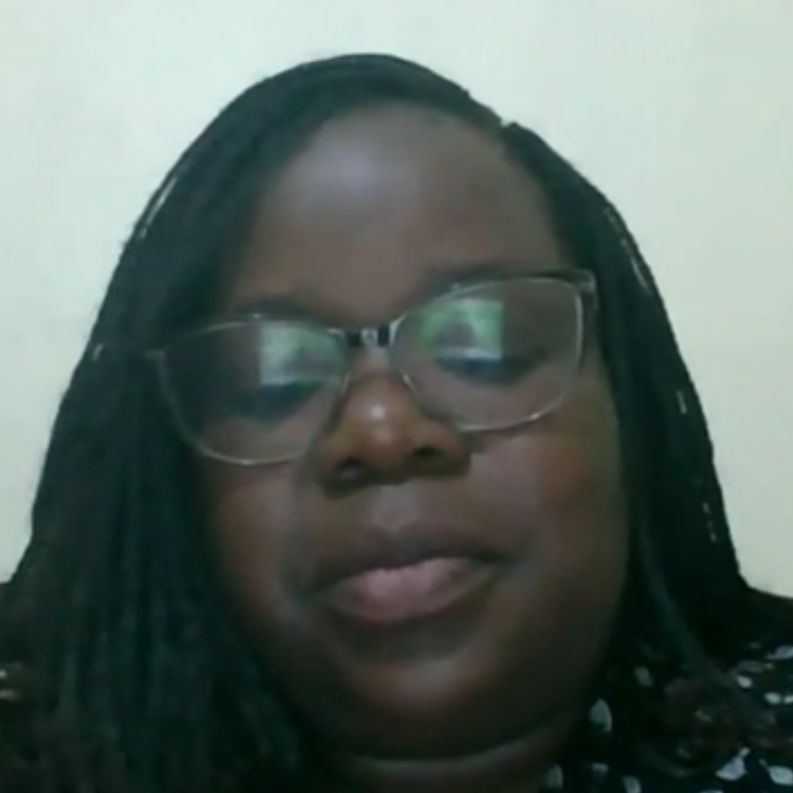
- Other name: Olithia
- Citizenship: Malawi
- Education: University of Malawi (LLB) Leiden University (MA)
- Occupation: Lawyer
- Known for: Women's rights activism

Hazel Olithia Miseleni is a Malawian lawyer and women's rights activist. She has worked to ensure that Malawian women and children are aware of the protection that the law supplies to them. She believes that ending child marriage could deliver Malawi a benefit of $500m over fifteen years. Her work for Malawi's Women Lawyers Association has gained the interest of the Clooney Foundation and Voice of America.

== Education and career ==
Miseleni holds a Bachelor of Laws from the University of Malawi, Chancellor College in Zomba and also a Masters in International Children’s Rights from Leiden University in the Netherlands. She also completed specialised courses in human rights at the Centre for Human Rights at the University of Pretoria Faculty of Law, South Africa.

Miseleni has worked as a Principal Legal Aid Advocate for the Malawi Legal Aid Bureau. In 2023 she started teaching at the Department of Law of the Catholic University of Malawi where she is a senior lecturer; and she is also a Partner at Radiant Attorneys, a law firm in Blantyre, Malawi.

In 2024 she was interviewed by Voice of America where she explained how she worked to ensure that women in girls in Malawi were aware that the law will defend them. Girls and women are aware that they can be mistreated but they are not always aware that the law can help. She toured schools with Advancing Girls Education in Africa (AGE) Africa, the Women Lawyers Association and others to celebrate International Women's Day. She advised that girls can not only avoid GBV but they can report it.

== Activism ==
Miseleni has participated in efforts to improve access to justice for women and children in Malawi, including by conducting legal clinics in rural and peri-urban areas of the country. Miseleni has given motivational speeches to young girls in hopes of helping avoid early marriage and other forms of gender based violence.

In 2025 she and Rothna Begum wrote for The Nation about the economic advantages for Malawi in ending child marriage. Their article summarised the hardships suffered by young mothers but they also reported that this costs the women involved $167m in lost wages. Within 15 years the country could be $500m better off, as a reduced population growth delivers reduced costs, including those of education. They recommended the 2024 document titled Malawi’s National Strategy to End Child Marriage to the country's leadership.

== Awards or recognition ==
Miseleni is a 2023/2024 Waging Justice for Women Fellow, a fellowship by the Clooney Foundation for Justice and served her fellowship with the Women Lawyers Association of Malawi. She was part of the third cohort of Feminist Litigation Network fellowship run by the Initiative for Strategic Litigation in Africa.

== Publications ==
- Blog Post on the Importance of History in Child Care.
