= Violet Chipao =

Malawian judge (born 1981)

- in 2026 (video crop)
- Born: 7 May 1981 (age 45)
- Other name: Violet Palikena-Chipao
- Education: University of Malawi, University of Zimbabwe
- Occupation: Judge

Violet Chipao (born 7 May 1981), also known as Violet Palikena-Chipao, is a Malawian high court judge who joined the Financial Crimes Court Division in 2023. She has been involved in cases against serving government ministers.

== Life ==
Chipao was born in 1981. In 2006, she graduated in law from the University of Malawi and she became a magistrate. She went on to study for her masters degree at the University of Zimbabwe.

In 2020, Chipao was one of six women who were promoted to be high court judges. The others were Maureen Kondowe, Anneline Kanthambi; Agnes Patemba, Vikochi Chima and Charlotte Wezi Malonda. The appointment was lauded by feminists because half of the appointees were women. President Chakwera also promoted Ivy Kamanga and Healey Potani to be Supreme Court judges.

In September 2021, Chipao sentenced wildlife trader Lin Yunhua to 14 years in prison for trading illegally and money laundering. He had dealt in tonnes of pangolin scales, rhino horn and ivory. After his sentence he was then expected to be deported. Lin Yunhua was surprisingly pardoned by President Lazarus Chakwera in 2025. However after he was released, he was then re-arrested by the Anti-Corruption Bureau. The ACB had discovered that he had allegedly offered a large bribe during his trial. The bribe was to the officer-in-charge of Maula Prison, Aaron Ganyavu, in the hope that he would influence Chipao to give Lin Yunhua a more lenient sentence.

In 2022, Chipao was posted from the High Court in Zomba to the High Court in Lilongwe. She also served on the judiciary's training committee led by Annabel Mtalimanja. She would lead this committee herself in 2025. She was part of the newly formed Malawi Financial Crimes Court Division's delegation to visit the Kenya Judiciary Academy in 2023.

In April 2025, Chipao was considering a high profile case against Nicholas Dausi and Joseph Mwanamvekha who had been Cabinet ministers and three others. The case involved the alleged purchase, at the inflated price of 18 billion Kwacha of supplies for the prison service in 2019 and 2020. Chipao refused an appeal by Mwanamvekha's lawyers and referred the case to trial.

In February 2026, Chipao questioned the Director of Public Prosecutions, Fostino Maele, to account for why he had stopped a case against Jean Mathanga. Mathanga was a serving government minister for Energy and Mining. Former minister (and serving minister), Norman Chisale, escaped prosecution for unexplained wealth in March 2026 when the Director of Public Prosecutions decided to not proceed with a 2024 case against him involving 5 billion Kwacha. Chipao ordered that the case be discontinued on 5 March 2026.

Professor Garton Kamchedzera who teaches law at the University of Malawi believes that politics is overruling legal judgement. He believes that these repeated stoppages of cases are likely to undermine confidence in Malawi's system of justice.

She ruled in support of Nessimu Nyama of Nema Farm Seeds who had his finances frozen by the Financial Intelligence Authority as it was suspected that they were the result of crime. Chipao rejected the assertion and returned control of the money to Nessimu Nyama in August 2026. The case arose as the result of business he had done with the Malawi Enterprise Development Fund (Medf).
