= Likoma District =

District of Malawi

Coordinates: 12°05′S 34°40′E

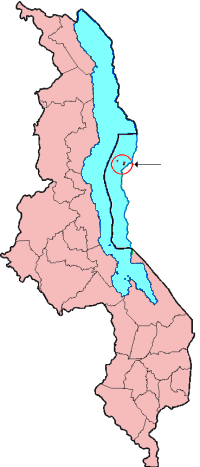
Location of Likoma District in Malawi

Likoma District is the least populous district of Malawi, which consists of two separate exclaves of Malawi situated within Mozambican waters in Lake Malawi (also known in Tanzania as Lake Nyasa and in surrounding Mozambique as Lago Niassa). It consists of two main islands, Likoma and Chizumulu. It is a district in the Northern Region of Malawi. The capital is Likoma. The district covers an area of 20 km², and has a population of 14,527.

== History ==
Whereas Portuguese missionaries colonized the interior of Angola and Mozambique in the 19th century, Anglican missionaries colonized Malawi, including the islands in Lake Malawi.

In 1954, an agreement was made to make the middle of Lake Malawi the border between Malawi and neighboring Mozambique; however, Likoma and Chizumulu islands were kept as part of Malawi.

== Demographics ==
At the time of the 2018 Census of Malawi, the distribution of the population of Likoma District by ethnic group was as follows:

- 73.8% Nyanja
- 9.2% Chewa
- 9.1% Tonga
- 3.1% Tumbuka
- 1.4% Yao
- 1.2% Ngoni
- 1.1% Lomwe
- 0.4% Nkhonde
- 0.2% Mang'anja
- 0.1% Sena
- 0.1% Lambya
- 0.0% Sukwa
- 0.3% Others

== Culture ==
The Likoma people are mostly fishermen and speak a traditional Nkamanga language. There are mostly small villages on both islands, with the exception of Mbamba with an Anglican cathedral. There are few cars but plenty of four-wheelers, creating a unique blend of tourism and local culture.

== Geography ==
The district covers an area of 20 km^{2} and has a population of 14,527 at the 2018 Census. The population density is thus approximately 726 people per square kilometre. It is the smallest of Malawi's districts. There is one airport, on the main island.

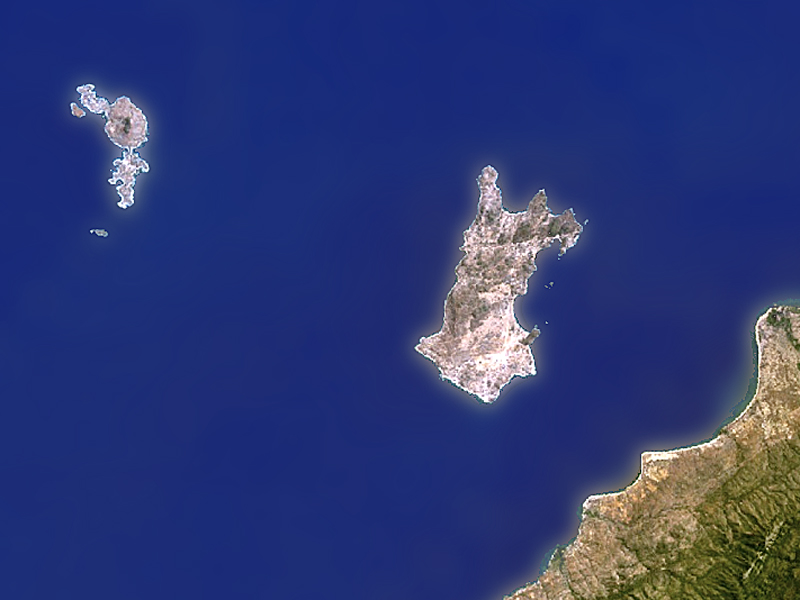
Satellite view of the Likoma District.

=== Main Towns ===
- Mbamba
- Madimba
- Chinyanya
- Chiponde
- makungulu
- Khuyu
- Nkhwazi
- Mbungo
- Ngani
- Yofu
- Ulisa
- Makulawe

== Government and administrative divisions ==
There is a single National Assembly constituency representing the Likoma Islands:

- Likoma Islands

Since the 2009 election it has been held by O. A. Thundu of the Democratic Progressive Party.

== Politics ==
The district was visited by none of the dozen presidential hopefuls in the 2014 election cycle, which locals took as a sign of discouragement.

== Climate ==
Most of the island is grassland, and the dominant trees are baobab tree and the mango tree. Animal life is made up of small amphibians, birds, and some of the most diverse fish life in Malawi.

== Famous people ==
- Cuthy Mede artist
- Frank Chipasula writer, editor and university professor
- Grace Malenga paediatrician and researcher
- Sarai Chisala Tempelhoff lawyer and activist
- Upile Chisala poet
