= Mercy Kazima =

Malawian mathematics educator

- Born: May 1, 1965 (age 61)
- Education: University of Malawi (BEd. Sc., BSc) University of Leeds (MSc, PhD)
- Occupation: Lecturer
- Employer: University of Malawi
- Title: Professor of Mathematics Education

Mercy Kazima (born 1 May 1965) is a Malawian mathematics educator and Professor of Mathematics Education at the University of Malawi. Her research focuses on mathematical knowledge for teaching, teaching mathematics in multilingual classrooms, and mathematics teacher education.

== Early life and education ==
Kazima was born in Lilongwe, the third daughter in a family of seven children. She attended primary school in Lilongwe and secondary school in Malosa. She graduated from the University of Malawi with a Bachelor of Education in Science, majoring in Mathematics, completing the degree in 1988. Kazima completed her master's and doctoral studies at the University of Leeds; her doctoral thesis was titled "Malawian students' understanding of probability", and was jointly supervised by Tom Roper and Melissa Rodd.

== Career ==
Kazima joined the University of Malawi in January 1991 as an assistant lecturer in mathematics education and was promoted to lecturer after her return from her master's studies at Leeds in 1993. She was promoted to senior lecturer in 2006, and in January 2009 became dean of the faculty, the first woman to hold the post since the university was founded. She has since become Professor of Mathematics Education at the University of Malawi.

Kazima has taken part in international collaborations on teaching mathematics to students learning in a second language, including a research project on learners of mathematics who are linguistically disadvantaged based at the University of Oxford. Kazima led two five-year projects with the University of Stavanger and funded by the Norwegian Programme for Capacity Development in Higher Education and Research for Development (NORHED): Improving Quality and Capacity of Mathematics Teacher Education in Malawi (2014–2018) and Strengthening Numeracy in Early Years of Primary Education through Professional Development of Teachers (2017–2021).

Writing with Jakobsen about the NORHED project, Kazima reported that it established Malawi's first doctoral programme in mathematics education; previously, the University of Malawi offered only a general education doctorate. The project also created a master's course on the history and pedagogy of mathematics. The professional development course, which started in 2016 and lasted three years, was available to mathematics educators at all eight Malawi primary teacher colleges; by 2018, 89 had completed it, including 17 women.

== Recognition and service ==
Kazima is a former president of the Southern Africa Association of Research, Mathematics, Science and Technology Education (SAARMSTE). In 2024, she was elected member-at-large of the executive committee of the International Commission of Mathematical Instruction for the term beginning in 2025.

== Selected publications ==
- "Mother tongue policies and mathematical terminology in the teaching of mathematics" Pythagoras, vol. 2008, no. 67, 2008, pp. 55–60.
- With Arne Jakobsen and Dun N Kasoka (2016) "Use of Mathematical Tasks of Teaching and the Corresponding LMT Measures in the Malawi Context," The Mathematics Enthusiast: Vol. 13 : No. 1 , Article 11, pp. 171–186.
- With Everton Lacerda Jacinto, Arne Jakobsen and Raymond Bjuland (2021)"Mathematics Teacher Education in Malawi", in Denisse R. Thompson et al. (eds) International Perspectives on Mathematics Teacher Education (Emerald)
