= Cuthy Mede =

Malawian artist (born 1949)

- Born: 1949 (age 76–77); Zimbabwe
- Education: Chancellor College (Fine Arts)
- Known for: Paintings with strong local Malawian themes (people, events, Biblical and indigenous religious interpretations, social concepts); Founder of Gallerie Africaine, Malawi's first locally owned art gallery
- Notable work: Large mural for Lilongwe City Centre
- Style: Painting; Modern art
- Movement: Modernism; Futurism; Cubism; Pointillism

Cuthy Mede is a Malawian artist.

== Early life ==
Cuthy Mede was born to Malawian parents in Zimbabwe in 1949. He grew up on Likoma Island in Lake Malawi. Later, he studied Fine Arts at Chancellor College.

== Career ==
He worked as a lecturer in the 1970s at his alma mater. In the 1980s, Mede established Gallerie Africaine, the first art gallery by a local artist in Malawi. Mede exhibited his work in Lilongwe's City Centre, selling his work to international collectors.

Mede encouraged the work of young Malawian artists struggling to make a living as street traders selling folk art and wood carvings. He brought fine art work from other Malawian artists into his gallery. One commission was for a large mural decorating the City Centre.

Mede is best known for his modern art styles: modern, futurist, cubist, and pointillist, with strong local themes. His paintings depict local people, historic and current events in Malawi, Biblical references with local interpretations, indigenous religious expressions, and paintings about concepts such as Justice, Greed, Man and Machine.
