= Norman Chisale =

Malawian politician

Deputy Minister of Homeland Security (Operations)
- Incumbent
- Assumed office October 30, 2025
- President: Peter Mutharika

Norman Chisale is a Malawian politician who became Deputy Minister of Homeland Security (Operations) in 2025.

== Life ==
Chisale was charged with having unexplained wealth in 2024.

He was appointed to be the Deputy Minister of Homeland Security (Operations) by President Peter Mutharika on 30 October 2025.

He escaped prosecution in March 2026 when the Director of Public Prosecutions decided to not proceed with the 2024 case against him involving 5 billion Kwacha. Judge Violet Chipao ordered that the case be discontinued on 5 March 2026.
