= Edward Sawerengera =

Malawian diplomat and agronomist

Malawian Ambassador to the United States
- In office 2016–2021
- Preceded by: Necton Mhura
- Succeeded by: Esme Chombo

Personal details
- Born: Edward Yakobe Sawerengera Chiradzulu, Malawi

Edward Yakobe Sawerengera is a Malawian diplomat and agronomist who formerly served as the Malawian ambassador to Brazil, the United States, the Bahamas, Canada, and Mexico.

== Career ==
He attended the University of Malawi and obtained a degree in agriculture in 1975. Sawerengera started his agribusiness career by working for the state agricultural marketing agency, Agricultural Development and Marketing Corporation (ADMARC) where he worked for twenty years. He went to graduate school in Scotland where he attended Strathclyde Graduate Business School and obtained an MBA in 1997. He later worked in other agricultural management roles which included working as CEO for Malawi Social Action Fund, National Food Reserve Agency, and deputy CEO for David Whitehead and Sons.

He served as Director General for State Residences under President Bingu wa Mutharika.

Sawerengera was appointed as ambassador to Brazil in 2014. He moved to the U.S. in 2016 when was appointed as Ambassador to the U.S. He was also credentialed for the Bahamas, Canada, and Mexico in that post. His tour ended in 2018. However, after a lengthy dispute over the terms of his relocation benefits with the government and the COVID-19 pandemic, he left the US in 2021.

== Personal life ==
He was married to educator, Dr. Margaret Asalele Mbilizi who died in 2019.
