= Centre for Human Rights, Education, Advice and Assistance =

Organisation based in Malawi

Centre for Human Rights, Education, Advice and Assistance (CHREAA) is a non-profit organization in Blantyre in Malawi that assists marginalized people with human rights issues and legal advice. It facilitates access to justice for the poor. Part of their advocacy work in reforming the criminal justice system, particularly in the prisons in Malawi.

In July 2024 they were one of many organisations who signed an open protest letter to the Minister of Justice protesting about the death penalty in Malawi.
