= Lilongwe University of Agriculture and Natural Resources =

University in Malawi

University of Agriculture and Natural Resources
- Bunda College of Agriculture
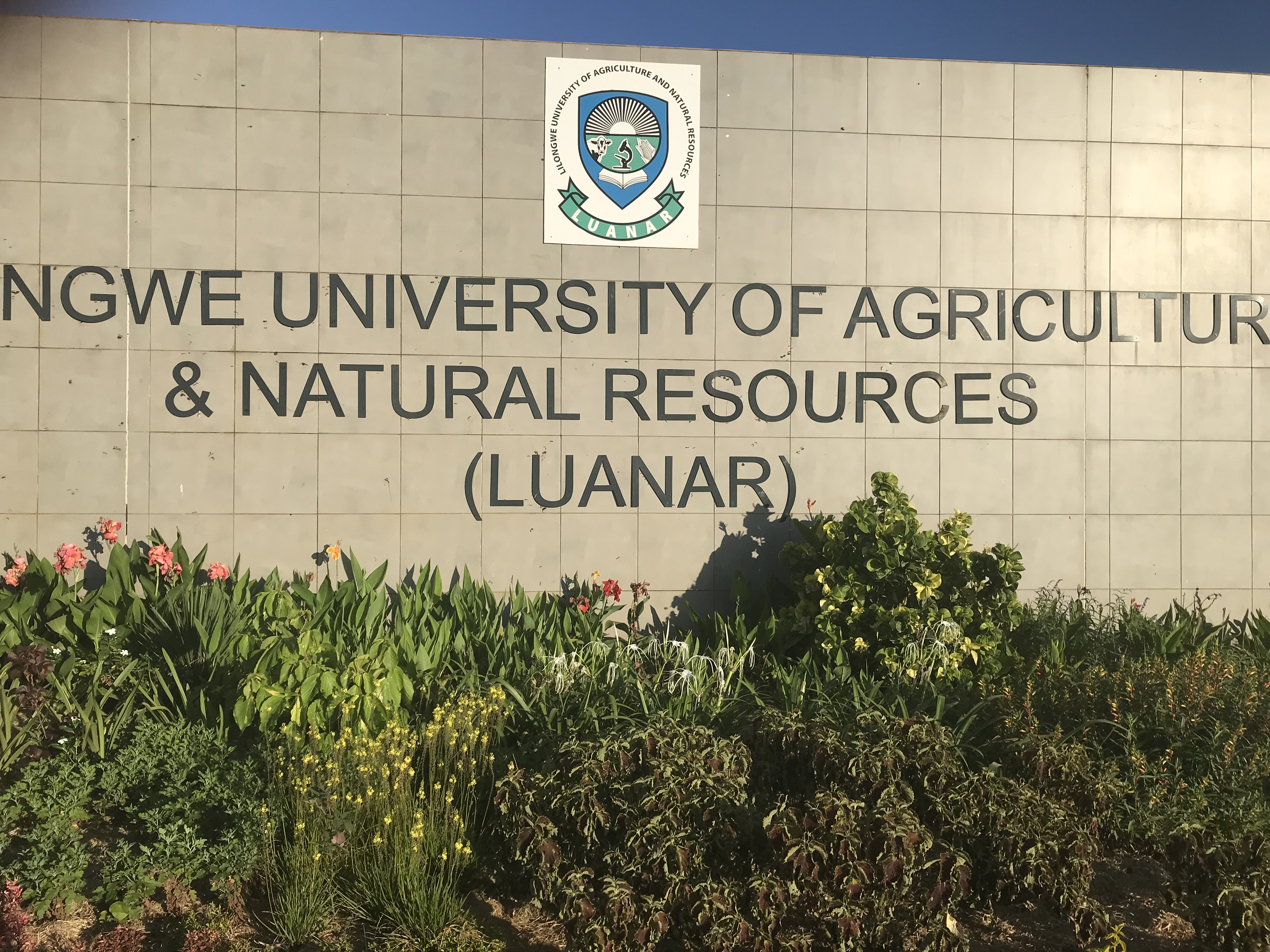
- Former names: Bunda College of Agriculture, a constituent college of the University of Malawi
- Motto in English: Knowledge, Innovation, Excellence
- Type: Public
- Established: 2011
- Chancellor: The President of the Republic of Malawi
- Vice-Chancellor: Professor Emmanuel Kaunda
- Students: over 8,000
- Location: Lilongwe, [Malawi
- Colours: Green, blue, white
- Website: www.luanar.ac.mw

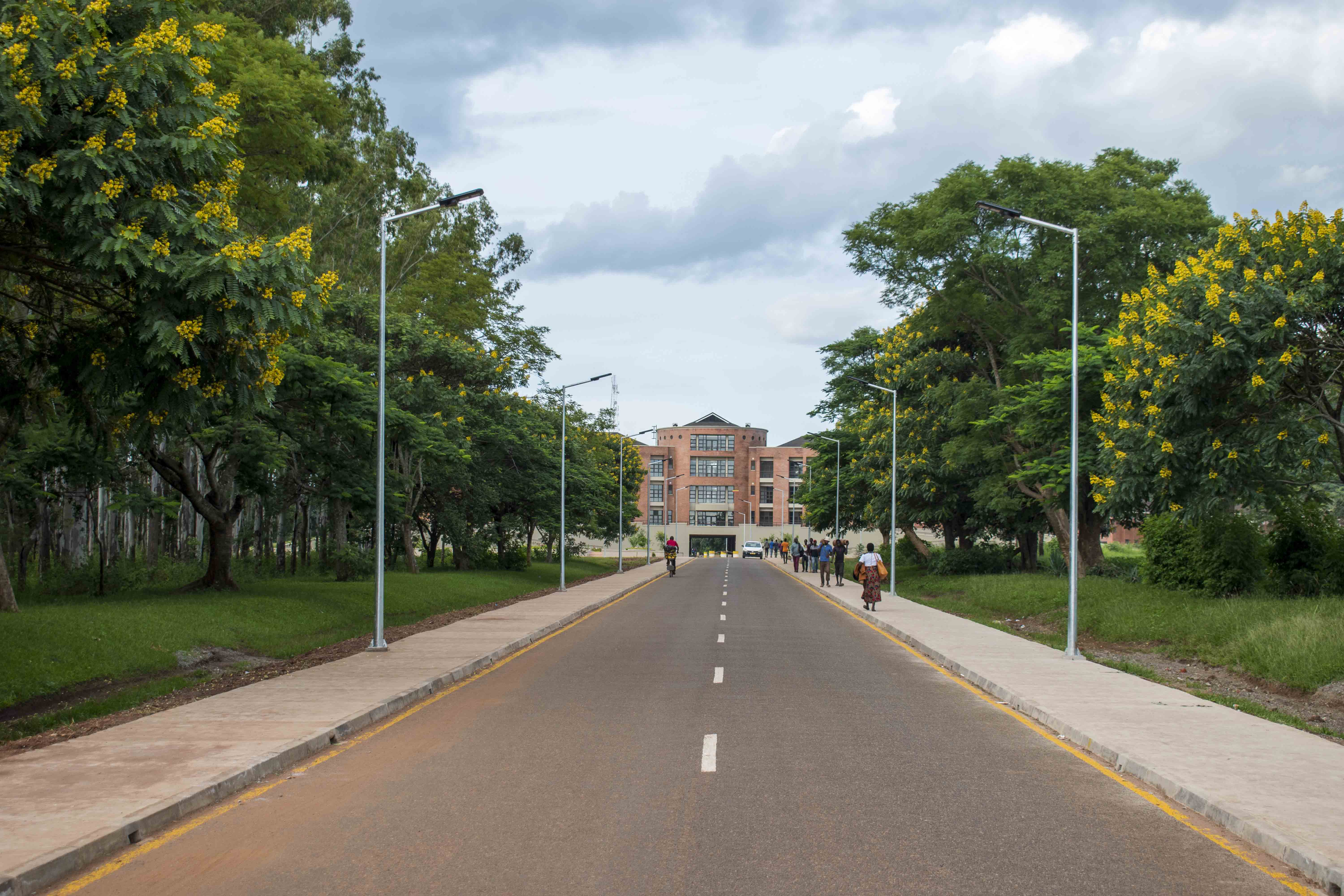

The Lilongwe University of Agriculture and Natural Resources (LUANAR) is a university outside Lilongwe, Malawi. It was formed in 2011 by a merger between Bunda College of Agriculture of the University of Malawi and Natural Resources College (NRC).

== History ==
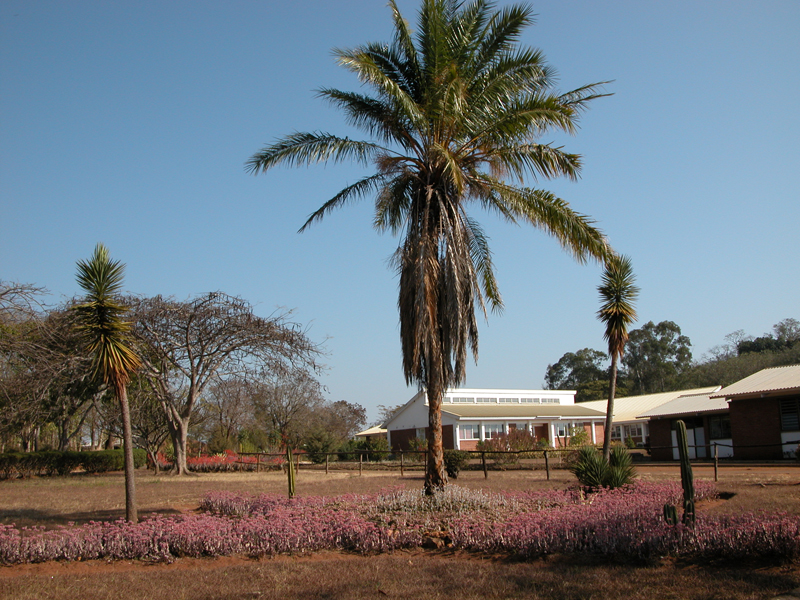
Bunda College of Agriculture in 2004

In a landmark address to the Malawi parliament on 24 May 2010, the third State President of the Republic of Malawi, His Excellency the late Professor Bingu wa Mutharika shared his vision of establishing six universities in Malawi. This was meant to address the problems of limited university access and to increase the pool of well-trained human resource in the country in order to accelerate the socio-economic development of Malawi. One of the new universities to be established was the Lilongwe University of Agriculture and Natural Resources (LUANAR) which was to be formed by transforming the then Bunda College of Agriculture into a university with the integration of Natural Resources College (NRC).

LUANAR was therefore created through an Act of Parliament No. 22 of 2011 and started its operations on 1 July 2012, with Bunda Campus as the initial institution until NRC was fully integrated into LUANAR in December 2014.

It has five faculties: Faculty of Agriculture (founded in 1967), Faculty of Natural Resources (2001), Faculty of Development Studies (2004), Faculty of Food and Human Sciences (2013) and the Faculty of Veterinary Medicine (2013). Ph.D. programmes are operated in collaboration with the Regional Universities Forum for Capacity Building in Agriculture (RUFORUM).

Bunda Farm, which was part of Bunda College and an economic negative for the college, became a limited company in 2005. In 2017, Bunda Farm Ltd. started a service station with fuel pumps at the campus in order to generate income to the university as well as to train students in business management.

== Faculties, departments and centres ==
The Lilongwe University of Agriculture and Natural Resources has the following faculties and departments.

=== Faculty of Agriculture ===
The Faculty is organized in six departments namely: Crop and Soil Science Department, Agricultural Engineering Department, Department of Horticulture, Animal Science Department, Basic Sciences Department and Veterinary Medicine (Prospective Faculty of Veterinary Medicine). The Basic Sciences Department is there to provide services to other departments at Bunda College of Agriculture in the teaching of basic and fundamental sciences. These include Biology, Chemistry, Mathematics, Physics, Computer Applications, Microbiology, Biochemistry, and Biometry. Staff members from the department also assist in teaching other courses from sister departments. Some of these courses are pollution science, thermodynamics, gender studies, desktop publishing, management of information systems and other similar courses

==== Agricultural Engineering Department ====
The Agricultural Engineering Department was established at Bunda College of Agriculture in 1972 and has the mandate of teaching, conducting research, and providing outreach and consultancy services in irrigation and agricultural engineering. The department takes a leading role in the promotion of agricultural production through the development and introduction of appropriate engineering technologies and practices for the sustainable production, distribution, and processing of biological products such as crops and livestock. The department places a strong emphasis on research and firmly believes that a research-oriented atmosphere enhances the quality of the teaching and learning process. The department welcomes partnership with industry as one way of linking its teaching and research with industrial needs. The mission of the Agricultural Engineering Department is to advance, promote and disseminate the knowledge and application of engineering needed to efficiently produce, distribute, and process biological products while conserving natural resources, preserving environmental quality, and ensuring the health and safety of people.

===== Department programs =====
- Bachelor of Science in Agricultural Engineering (Honors)
- Bachelor of Science in Irrigation Engineering (Honors)
- Bachelor of Science in Environmental Engineering (Honors)
- Master of Science in Irrigation Engineering
- Master of Science in Machinery Systems Engineering
- Master of Science in Processing and Food Engineering

==== Animal Science Department ====
The Department of Animal Science is one of the five Departments within the Faculty of Agriculture.

===== Department programs =====
- Bachelor of Science in Animal Science
- Diploma in Dairy Science and Technology
- Master of Science in Animal Science

==== Basic Sciences Department ====
All first year students at Bunda Campus take foundation courses offered by the Basic Science department. The courses include Biology, Chemistry, Computer Science, Mathematics, Microbiology and Physics.

==== Crop and Soil Sciences Department ====
===== Department programs =====
- Master of Science in Agronomy
- Bachelor of Science in Agronomy
- Bachelor of Science in Agriculture
- Bachelor of Science in Soil Science
- Bachelor of Science in Seed Systems
- Master of Science in Plant Breeding
- Master of Science in Crop Protection
- Master of Science in Soil Science
- Master of Science in Seed Systems
- Ph.D in Crop and Soil Science by Research
- Bachelor of Science in Crop Protection (Honors)

==== The Department of Horticulture ====
The Department of Horticulture was initially part of the Department of Forestry and Horticulture until 2014 when it was delinked and moved to the Faculty of Agriculture.

===== Department programs =====
- Bachelor of Science in Biotechnology
- Bachelor of Science in Horticulture
- Master of Science in Horticulture

=== Faculty of Development Studies ===
The Faculty of Development Studies was established in 2012 at LUANAR. The faculty has five departments namely; Agriculture Education and Development Communication, Agricultural and Applied Economics, Extension and Rural Development and Agribusiness Management. The following are the Departments under the Faculty of Development Studies.

==== Agribusiness Management Department ====
The Lilongwe University of Agriculture and Natural Resources (LUANAR) through the Department of Agribusiness Management (ABM) is the only higher education institution in Malawi offering long term training in cooperative and microfinance related studies. The Agribusiness Management (ABM) Departments is one of the Departments in the Faculty of Development Studies of Lilongwe University of Agriculture and Natural Resources.

===== Department programs =====
- Bachelor of Science in Agribusiness Management
- Bachelor of Science in Agricultural Enterprise Development and Microfinance
- Bachelor Arts in Cooperative Business Studies
- Master of Science in Agribusiness Management

==== Agriculture Education and Development Communication Department ====
This department was established in 1993 to offer Language and Communication Skills courses to undergraduates. Currently, the department offers communication skills courses to all students and trains secondary school agriculture teachers.

===== Department programs =====
- Bachelor of Science in Agricultural Development Communication
- Bachelor of Science in Agriculture Education
- Master of Science in Agriculture Education
- Bachelor of Science in Agricultural Innovations
- Agriculture Education and Development Communication

==== Agricultural and Applied Economics Department ====
The department aims to advance and promote knowledge and practical skills in agricultural and applied economics through training, research, consultancies and outreach with the aim of contributing to poverty reduction by promoting efficiency in agricultural production and increased incomes for the majority of farmers in Malawi. The department also offers courses in the Collaborative MSc Programme in Agricultural and Applied Economics.

===== Department programs =====
- Bachelor of Science in Agricultural Economics
- Bachelor of Science in Development Economics
- Master of Science in Agricultural and Applied Economics
- PhD in Agricultural and Resource Economics
- PhD in Agricultural and Resource Economics
- Master of Science in Agricultural and Applied Economics
- Bachelor of Arts in Development Economics

==== Extension Department ====
===== Department programs =====
- Bachelor of Science in Agricultural Extension
- Master of Science in Rural Development and Extension
- PhD in Rural Development and Extension

=== Faculty Of Veterinary Medicine ===
The Faculty of veterinary medicine at LUANAR was established in 2013 and began its professional education program in 2014. The Faculty graduated its first batch 12 veterinary doctors in 2019. Veterinary research is conducted in the faculty and has international collaborations with University of Edinburgh, Valencia, Hokkaido, Cornel, and ILRI. The faculty emphasizes research of infectious diseases, Research is also conducted on immunity and nutrition, cardiovascular diseases, reproductive diseases, and diseases of terrestrial and aquatic wildlife. Public Service. The service programs focus on the diagnosis, prevention, treatment, and control and prevention of animal diseases. The faculty assists veterinary practitioners, animal owners, and the general public through partnership with government and NGOs.

==== Veterinary Pathobiology ====
===== Department programs =====
- Bachelor of Veterinary Medicine

=== Faculty of Food and Human Sciences ===
The Faculty of Food and Human Sciences was established following the instituting of Lilongwe University of Agriculture and Natural Resources (LUANAR) through an Act of Parliament No. 22 of 2011. LUANAR emanated from Bunda College of Agriculture, then a constituent college of University of Malawi (UNIMA), which was de-linked from UNIMA on 1 July 2012. The Faculty of Food and Human Sciences (FFHS) stemmed from the then Department of Home Economics and Human Nutrition (DHEHN) which was established in 1984. From 1984 to 2013, the DHEHN grew in terms of staffing (4 to 22), student enrolment (3 to 331), academic programmes (0- 4), teaching and research facilities, financial and material resources, outreach programmes, publications, and in its relevance to national, regional and international development goals. The FFHS became operational in July 2013, consisting of the office of the dean, departments of Food Science and Technology, Human Nutrition and Health, and Human Ecology

=== Human Nutrition and Health Department ===
==== Department programs ====
- Bachelor of Science in Nutrition and Food Science
- Post-Graduate Diploma in Clinical Dietetics
- Master of Science in Human Nutrition
- Master of Science in Clinical Dietetic

=== Human Ecology Department ===
==== Department programs ====
- Bachelor of Science in Gender and Development
- Bachelor of Science in Human Sciences and Community Services
- Diploma in Gender and Development
- Diploma in Youth Development
- Master of Science in Gender and Development

==== Food Science and Technology Department ====
===== Department programs =====
- Bachelor of Science in Food Science and Technology
- Bachelor of Science in Nutrition and Food Science
- Master of Science in Food Science and Technology

=== Faculty of Natural Resources ===
The faculty of Natural Resources established in July 2001, consists of three departments as follows; i.e. Department of Aquaculture and Fisheries Science, Department of Forestry and Department of Environmental Science and Management.

==== The Department of Forestry ====
The Department of Forestry was initially part of the Department of Horticulture and Forestry. The vision of the Department of Forestry is to be LUANAR's center of excellence in training, research, extension and consultancies in forestry within Malawi and globally. It is one of the departments in the Faculty of Natural Resources.

===== Department programs =====
- Bachelor of Science in Agroforestry
- Bachelor of Science in Forestry
- Master of Science in Agroforestry
- Master of Science in Environmental Forestry
- Master of Science in Social Forestry
- PhD in Forestry

==== The Department of Aquaculture and Fisheries Science ====
Aquaculture and Fisheries Science Department (AQFD) at Bunda College originated from a single course Aquaculture and Wildlife Management offered in the Department of Animal Science from 1974 to 1993. Due to demand for capacity building in Aquaculture from SADC region, a draft Aquaculture curriculum was produced in 1991 and Aquaculture courses were to be offered as an option in the Animal Science Department. The first optional courses were offered in 1994/95-academic year. Students from other countries in SADC started joining the college in the same year for Diploma and Degree programs in Agriculture with bias in aquaculture. Some regional students studying in the Animal Science Masters program had opted to do research in aquaculture.

===== Department programs =====
- Bachelor of Science in Aquaculture and Fisheries Science
- Master of Science in Aquaculture
- Master of Science in Fisheries
- PhD in Aquaculture and Fisheries
- Master of Science in Aquaculture and Fishiries

==== The Department of Environment and Natural Resource Management ====
The Department of Environmental Science and Management (DESM) was established in 2001 and it belongs to the Faculty of Natural Resources. The department has a complement of fourteen academic staff positions. The areas of specialization for the staff members include Environmental Management, Wild-life Ecology, Environment and Development, Environmental Science, Environmental and Natural Resource Economics, and Genetic Resource Conservation. There are three positions for technicians in the department to be filled.

===== Department programs =====
- Bachelor of Science in Environmental Science

Bachelor of Science in Natural Resources Management (Land and Water)

- Bachelor of Science in Natural Resources Management (Wildlife and Ecotourism)
- Master of Science in Environment and Climate Change

=== Faculty of Postgraduate Studies ===
This offers programmes at the postgraduate diploma, masters and doctoral levels

== Controversies ==
In December 2017, student protests over frequent power outages at the Bunda campus. It ended in property damages and an arrest of 46 students. The campus was closed for some time. The Malawi Human Rights Commission that investigated the death of a student found that some students had been subject to torture or inhumane treatment by the police, but did not find the police responsible for the student's death.

== See also ==
- List of universities in Malawi
- Education in Malawi

== Notable alumni ==
1. Dalitso Kabambe - banker
2. Tisungane Sitima - gender specialist
