= Brian Bowler =

Malawian Ambassador and diplomat

Brian Granthen Bowler (born 27 November 1964) is a Malawian Ambassador and diplomat. Bowler is the ambassador and permanent representative of Malawi to the United Nations, having been assigned to the post on June 4, 2010. He was recalled under the government of President Joyce Banda but was designated again by current President Peter Mutharika.

== Career ==
Prior to his appointment as UN ambassador, Bowler served in the foreign ministry of Malawi as representative to India and Belgium.

== Personal life ==
Bowler is married to Kelly Ann Ernst, an American health officer who works for the March of Dimes. They have two children.
