= Steve Dick Tennyson Matenje =

Malawian diplomat and civil servant (born 1956)

Steve Dick Tennyson Matenje (born 17 February 1956 in Zomba) is a Malawian civil servant and permanent representative. A civil servant since 1980, Matenje had served as previously as the Solicitor General and Secretary of Justice. He has been the Permanent Representative to the United Nations for Malawi since 30 November 2006.

On September 10, 2010, Ambassador Matenje became Ambassador to the United States, with additional accreditation to Canada, Mexico, Argentina, and Colombia on a nonresidential basis.

== Education ==
Matenje earned his bachelor's degree in law from the University College London in 1983. After London, he received a Bachelor of Laws (LLB) degree from the University of Malawi with distinction, and a Certificate in legislative drafting in 1986 while then earning a Master of Arts degree in business law from London Guildhall University in 1987.

== Personal ==
He is the son of former cabinet minister, Dick Matenje, who was one of the 'Mwanza Four'.
