= University of Malawi =

University in Zomba, Malawi

- Established: 1964; 62 years ago
- Vice-Chancellor: Professor Samson Sajidu
- Location: (Malawi) Zomba, Malawi
- Campus: Urban

The University of Malawi (UNIMA; Chichewa: Yunivesite ya Malaŵi) is a public university in Zomba, Malawi. It was established in 1965. It is part of the Malawian government educational system. The last Vice-Chancellor was Professor John Kalenga Saka.

== History ==
The University of Malawi was founded a few months after Malawi Independence. The first enrollment consisted of 90 students in Blantyre. Teaching began in 1965 in Blantyre, and within two years the Institute of Public Administration at Mpemba, the Soche Hill College of Education and the Polytechnic in Blantyre, and Bunda College in Lilongwe became colleges of the university. In 1973, all the constituents of the university apart from the polytechnic and Bunda College moved to Zomba and were merged into Chancellor College. In 1979, Kamuzu College of Nursing became a college of the university, and in 1991 the College of Medicine in Blantyre was formed as a further constituent college.

=== Malawi Writers Group ===
From 1970 the university was home to an academic and creative community known as the Malawi Writers Group. Notable members included Jack Mapanje, Steve Chimombo, Barnaba Zingani, Francis Moto, Willie Zingani and others.

=== Student Movements for Multi-Party Rule (1992) ===
During the movement toward the multiparty rule, UNIMA students participated in a protest that was organized by themselves as a part of fighting for their educational freedom. In March 1992, when Catholic Bishops in Malawi issued a Lenten Pastoral Letter that criticized Banda and his government, students of the University of Malawi at Chancellor College and the Polytechnic joined in through protests and demonstrations in support of the letter. This forced the authorities to close the campuses.

=== Youth for Freedom and Democracy ===
Youth for Freedom and Democracy (YFD) is a student political pressure group on campus. They publish the "Weekly Political Update" that is circulated to students on campus. They have been critical of Malawi's governance, and of the Paladin Energy mining company. In mid-September, Malawian police arrested several members of the group. They also arrested 21-year-old Black Moses, president of the YFD and interrogated him. A week later, 25-year-old Robert Chasowa, a fourth-year engineering student at the Malawi Polytechnic was found dead. Police ruled this a suicide but critics believe that he was murdered.

== Constituent colleges and academics ==
=== Current colleges ===
==== Chancellor College, based in Zomba ====
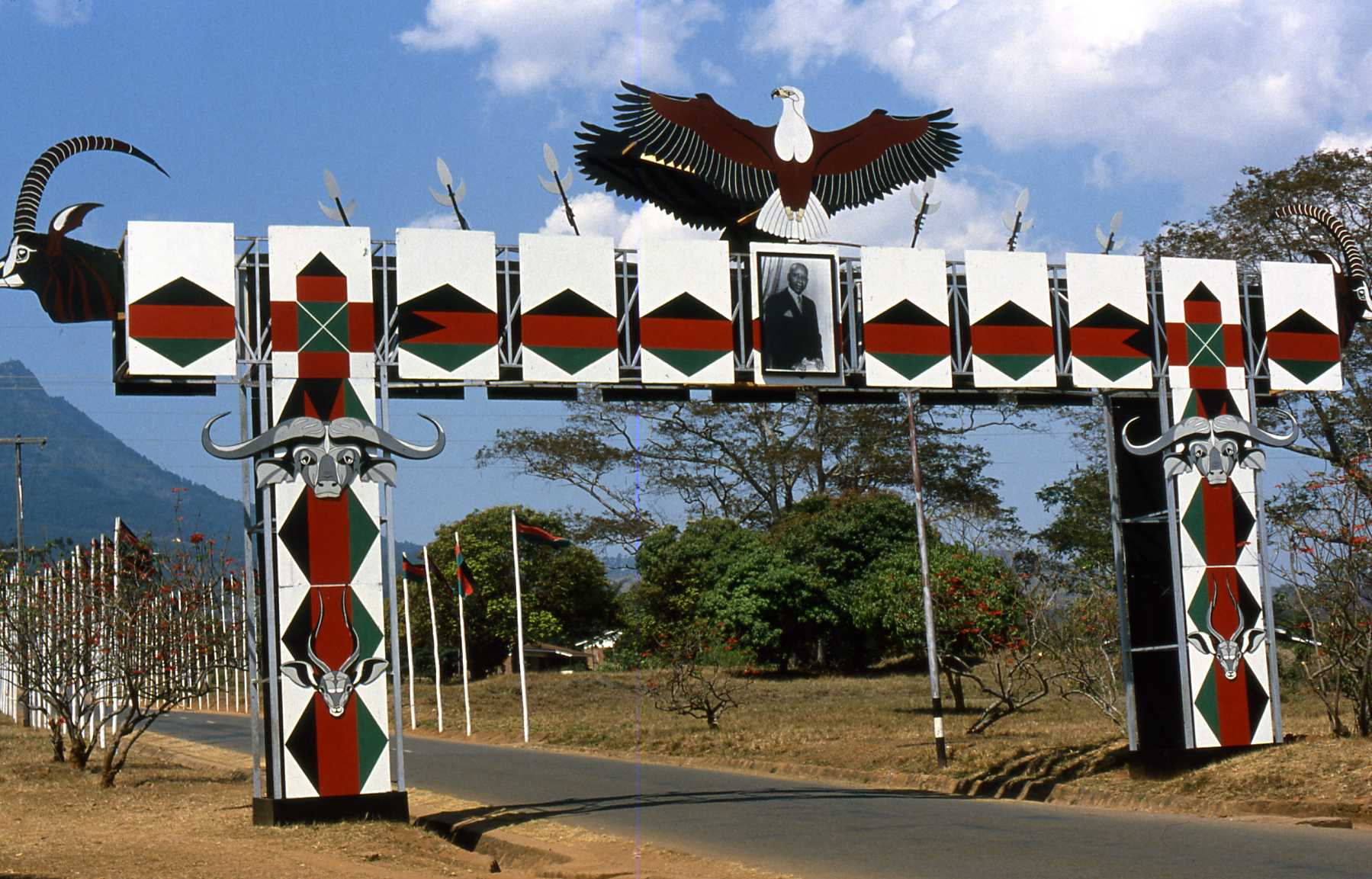
Chancellor College Entrance, 1991

Chancellor College is the largest college of the constituent colleges of the University of Malawi. It is also known as 'Chanco'. The college has five faculties: Faculty of Humanities, Faculty of Science, Faculty of Law, Faculty of Social Science and Faculty of Education. Departments service each faculty as follows:
Education: Curriculum and Teaching Studies and Educational Foundations

Humanities: African Languages and Linguistics, Classics, English, Fine and Performing Arts, French, Language and Communication Skills, Philosophy and Theology and Religious Studies.

Science: Biology, Chemistry, Computer Science, Geography and Earth Sciences, Home Economics, Physics, Mathematical Sciences.

Social Science: Economics, History, Psychology, Political and Administrative Studies and Sociology.

==== The Polytechnic, Blantyre Campus ====
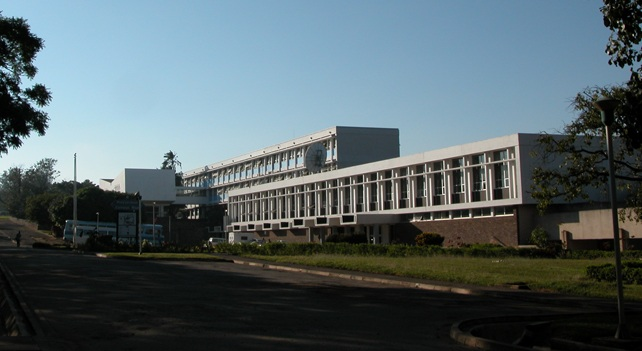
Malawi Polytechnic

The highest and most popular institution in Malawi offers various technical and vocational training based on national and regional needs.

Polytechnic has fifteen departments offering undergraduate degrees in accounting, business administration, management, civil(hons), mechanical(honors) and electrical engineering(hons), architecture and land management, environmental management, computing and information technology, journalism, language and communication, mathematics and statistics, physics and biochemical sciences, technical education and quantity surveying.

Polytechnic offers postgraduate programs in business administration, infrastructure development and transport management in response to the emerging needs of the industry and the pressure from the native baccalaureate graduates. After being delinked from the University of Malawi, The Polytechnic now operates as the Malawi University of Business and Applied Sciences (MUBAS) which has recently launched the first UniPod in Malawi.

=== Former colleges ===
==== College of Medicine ====
The College of Medicine and Kamuzu College of Nursing delinked from the University of Malawi and combined to form the Kamuzu University of Health Sciences (KUHeS) in 2019.

==== Kamuzu College of Nursing, based in Lilongwe ====
The College of Medicine and Kamuzu College of Nursing delinked from the University of Malawi and combined to form the Kamuzu University of Health Sciences (KUHeS) in 2019.

While Principal of Kamuzu College of Nursing, Address Mauakowa Malata led the college to became a World Health Organization collaborating centre for interprofessional education and leadership.

==== Bunda College, Lilongwe ====
Bunda College of Agriculture offers BSc's, MSc's and PhD degrees in agriculture, Environmental Sciences and Development Studies. Its mission is to advance and promote knowledge, skills, self-reliance and sound character for "sustainable food production and utilization; Improving income, food security and nutrition; and Conservation and management of biodiversity, the environment and natural resources. It is situated in Lilongwe 35.2 km from the capital city center. Nearby is the college farm serving commercial, practical, academic and research purposes.

Following the restructuring of universities in Malawi in 2012 by the then President Bingu wa Mutharika, Bunda college is no longer part of the University of Malawi. Now Bunda College forms part of Lilongwe University of Agriculture and Natural Resources (LUANAR). The university has three campus, i.e. Bunda campus, the City campus and the NRC campus.

- Institute of Public Administration
- Soche Hill College of Education
- Malawi College of Accountancy

== Enrollment ==
The University of Malawi had 6,257 full-time students in 2007. Of those, 6226 were Malawian citizens, 26 were from SADC countries and 5 were from other, non-SADC countries.

== Vice-Chancellors of the university ==
- Professor Samson Sajidu 2022–Present
- Professor John Saka 2013–2019
- Professor Emmanuel Fabiano 2010–2013
- Professor Zimani David Kadzamira 2005–2010
- Professor David Rubadiri 2000–2005
- Professor Brown Beswick Chimphamba 1992–2000
- Dr John Michael Dubbey 1987–1990
- Dr David Kimble 1977–1986
- Professor Gordon Hunnings 1973–1977
- Dr Ian Michael 1965–1973

== Notable alumni ==
- Lazarus McCarthy Chakwera, President of Malawi
- Saulos Klaus Chilima, Former Vice President of Malawi
- Cassim Chilumpha, Former Vice President of Malawi
- Elson Kambalu, artist
- Andrew K.C. Nyirenda, Retired Chief Justice of Malawi
- Winford Masanjala, Associate Professor of Economics at University of Malawi, Secretary for Economic Planning and Development
- Caroline Alexander, author and journalist
- Thomas John Bisika, Economist
- Steve Chimombo, writer
- Frank Chipasula, Author, Poet and Educator
- Charles Chuka, Governor of the Reserve Bank of Malawi
- Gladys Ganda, Member of Parliament
- Otria Moyo Jere, Cabinet Minister
- Shemu Joyah, Film director
- Ken Kandodo, Finance Minister
- Paul Kishindo, Sociologist
- Jane Kambalame, diplomat
- Samson Kambalu, author
- Lucious Grandson Kanyumba, Cabinet Minister
- Ken Lipenga, Finance Minister
- Jack Mapanje, Poet and Writer
- Steve Dick Tennyson Matenje, UN Permanent Representative
- Margaret Roka Mauwa, Cabinet Minister
- Billy Abner Mayaya, human rights activist
- Cuthy Mede, artist
- Maxwell Mkwezalamba, African Union Commissioner
- Chrissie Mughogho, diplomat
- Samuel Mpasu, Speaker of the Malawi National Assembly
- Cornelius Mwalwanda, Cabinet Minister
- Hawa Ndilowe, diplomat
- Edward Sawerengera, diplomat, Agronomist
- Angela Zachepa, Member of Parliament
- James Tengatenga, Anglican bishop
- Paul Tiyambe Zeleza, historian
- Ngeyi Kanyongolo, Vice Chancellor of the Catholic University of Malawi
- George Jobe, Health Rights Activist
- Hazel Miseleni, Women's Rights Activist
- Mercy Kazima mathematics educator and Professor of Mathematics Education at the University of Malawi
- Tadala Kandulu Ngosi former national tennis champion and youth development advocate.

== See also ==
- Lilongwe University of Agriculture and Natural Resources
- List of universities in Malawi
- Education in Malawi
