= List of Malawian writers =

This is a list of Malawian writers.

- Tito Banda (1950–2014), novelist, academic
- Ezra Jofiya Chadza (1923–1985), poet and novelist
- William Chafulumira (1908–1981), writer on social issues
- Yesaya Chibambo, author of A Short History of the Ngoni (1933), translated into English by Rev. Charles Stuart.
- Shadreck Chikoti (b. 1979), writer and social activist
- Lula Pensulo (b. 1991) author, translator, and poet
- Kelvin Sulugwe (b. 1990), entrepreneur, diplomat; author of In Honest Ways.
- Steve Chimombo (1945–2015), writer, poet, editor and teacher
- Frank Chipasula (b. 1949), poet, writer, editor, publisher and academic
- Reuben Chirambo (d. 2011), scholar of African literature
- Robert Chiwamba, poet
- Tobias Dossi, author of a novel (1958) and humorous short stories (1965) in Chichewa.
- Aloysius Dziko, author of a novel in Chichewa (1965).
- Walije Gondwe (b. 1936), Malawi's first female novelist
- John Gwengwe, author of novels in Chichewa (1965, 1968).
- Lindsay Katchika Jere (b. 1999), children's writer.
- Aubrey Kachingwe (1926–2010s), novelist and short story writer
- Lawrence Kadzitche, short story writer
- Samson Kambalu (b. 1975), artist and autobiographer
- William Kamkwamba (b. 1987), inventor and author
- Gertrude Webster Kamkwatira (1966–2006), playwright
- Whyghtone Kamthunzi (1956–2000), novelist in Chichewa
- Caroline Kautsire, author of two autobiographical books
- Legson Kayira (1942–2012), novelist and autobiographer
- Stanley Onjezani Kenani (b. 1976), writer and poet
- Ken Lipenga (b. 1954), politician, journalist and writer
- John Lwanda (b. 1949), biographer, poet, doctor, publisher
- Qabaniso Malewezi (b. 1979), spoken-word poet
- Benedicto Wokomaatani Malunga (b. 1962), poet and broadcaster
- Jack Mapanje (1944–2026), writer and poet
- Emily Mkamanga (1949–2021), novelist and social commentator
- Felix Mnthali (b. 1933), poet, novelist and playwright
- Francis Moto (b. 1952), writer, academic, and diplomat
- Sam Mpasu (1945–2018), novelist and politician; author of prison memoirs
- Edison Mpina (1946–2001), poet
- Mpalive Msiska (living), academic
- Ndongolera Mwangupili (b. 1977), poet and short story writer
- George Mwase (c.1885–1962), author of a historical account of the 1915 rebellion, published 1967 (2nd edn. 1970).
- Anthony Nazombe (1955–2004), poet and academic
- Innocent Masina Nkhonyo (b. 1987), short story writer and poet
- Jolly Max Ntaba (1946–1993), novelist in Chichewa and English
- Samuel Josia Ntara or Nthara (1905–1979), novelist and historian
- D. D. Phiri (Desmond Dudwa Phiri), economist, historian and playwright
- Matilda Phiri, children's writer.
- Bonwell Kadyankena Rodgers (b. 1991), author and editor
- David Rubadiri (1930–2018), diplomat, academic and poet
- Tendai M. Shaba (b. 1989), author, writer and poet
- Paul Tiyambe Zeleza (b. 1955), historian, critic and writer
- Barnaba Zingani (b. 1958), novelist in Chichewa and English, teacher.
- Willie Zingani (1954–2024), novelist in English and Chichewa, journalist, poet, playwright

== See also ==
- Media of Malawi
- List of African writers by country
