= List of Chewa-language authors =

This is a list of notable persons (of any ethnicity or nationality) who wrote fiction, essays, or plays in the Chewa language.

== Story-writers and playwrights ==
The following have written published stories, novels, or plays in the Chewa language:

- William Chafulumira
- John Gwengwe
- E.J. Chadza
- Steve Chimombo
- Lula Pensulo
- Whyghtone Kamthunzi
- Francis Moto
- Samuel Josia Ntara
- Willie Zingani
- Bonwell Kadyankena Rodgers
- Barnaba Zingani
- Jolly Maxwell Ntaba

== Poets ==
- Jack Mapanje
- E.J. Chadza
- Benedicto Wokomaatani Malunga
- Innocent Masina Nkhonyo
