= Malawi Writers Group =

Malawian literary group founded in 1970

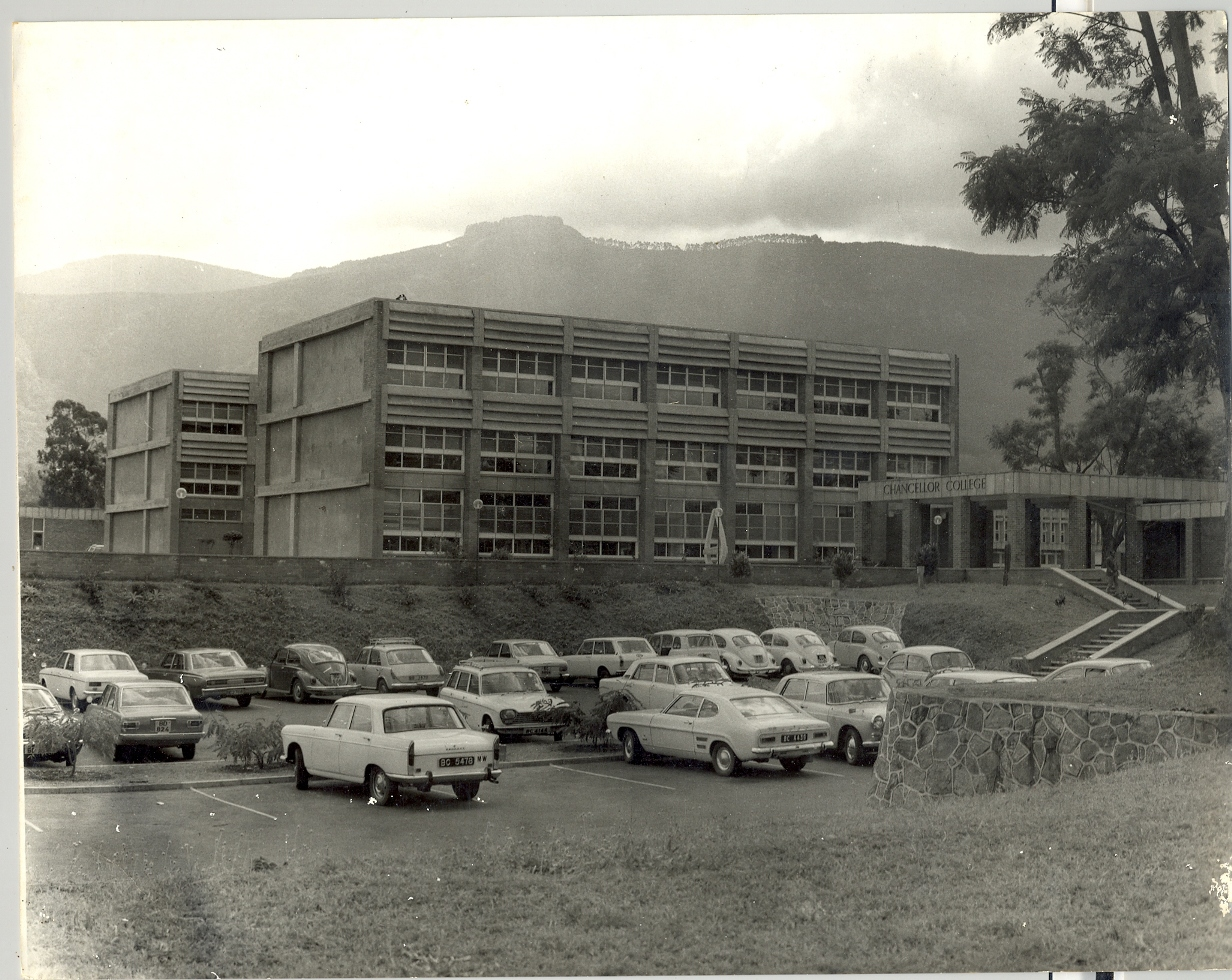
- Chancellor College, the primary base of the group.
- Founded: 1970
- Founders: Jack Mapanje, Frank Chipasula, Lupenga Mphande, James Ng'ombe, Scopas Gorinwa
- Defunct: c. 1994 (succeeded by Malawi Writers Union)
- Type: Literary circle, academic workshop
- Purpose: Malawian literature, poetry, drama, oral tradition
- Headquarters: University of Malawi

The Malawi Writers Group, sometimes referred to as the Writers Workshop, was an influential academic and creative community established in 1970 at the University of Malawi.

Operating largely during the 30-year rule of President Hastings Kamuzu Banda, a period marked by strict political censorship, the Group provided a platform for students and faculty, becoming the primary architect of modern Malawian literature. The Group published works of poetry, drama and prose in both English and Chichewa, and included early works by Jack Mapanje, Steve Chimombo, Barnaba Zingani, Francis Moto, Willie Zingani and others.

== History ==
The Malawi Writers Group was founded in April 1970 at Chichiri Campus of the University of Malawi, then in Blantyre. From 1973 it was based in the English Department of the University of Malawi's Chancellor College at Zomba. The Group was launched by students including Scopas Gorinwa, James Ng'ombe, Jack Mapanje, Frank Chipasula and Lupenga Mphande, who were soon joined by others including Felix Mnthali and Steve Chimombo. They were supported in their efforts by expatriate teachers, including Landeg White and David Kerr. The new Group attracted students from across the university's campuses, while members of the public also joined. Within weeks of its formation, up to 400 copies of the materials to be discussed at each meeting were being circulated. The Group was organised without a constitution and with a rotating chair, while everyone was invited to speak. While this helped foster a democratic institution, it was also an effort to obscure the Group's leaders from Malawi Censorship Board, which had been created in 1968.

Speaking in 1971, Steve Chimombo summed up the Group's aims:

We have got the Writers Group so that when anyone writes and he thinks that it's good enough to be shared around then we meet every Thursday and we discuss what we have written. And after that the beginning of publication because every writer would like to get published and have his work also read by other people apart from his own close friends.

The Group's formation was prompted by the expulsions of the educated elite from government in 1964 and student leaders from the university in 1966. Some of Malawi's most prominent post-independence writers, including David Rubadiri and Legson Kayira, were already living in exile, while others, including Aubrey Kachingwe, choose not to participate for fear of repercussions. This left a gap that the Group's younger leaders sought to fill by building a distinctively Malawian literary tradition that could offer a level of political criticism, while also trying to avoid being banned by the Government. This resulted in a focus on poetry, as the genre was seen to offer greater opportunities to circumvent the censors through the use of allusion, and an often cryptic writing style that appropriated idioms from folk tales. In time, the Group was viewed as the only viable forum for political discussion in the country. As a result, over half of its founding members were detained or forced into exile.

Despite these challenges, the Malawi Writers Group continued throughout the 1980s and into the 1990s. It's democratic structure remained, with two chair people, a man and a woman, elected annually alongside an advisor from the English Department. In 1985 it was noted that it continued to arouse suspicions from government authorities and steps were taken to prevent against interference. For example, if Jack Mapanje was taking part in a session then it was not advertised.

The 1994 general election, the first for 30 years, saw many restrictions lift, but this did not lead to the Group's expansion. While this period saw the greatest number of published poets in Malawian literary history, with poetry in both English and Chichewa appearing in more than a dozen new publications, few of these writers had published before or were members of the Writers Group. The following year saw the creation of the Malawi Writers Union (MAWU), which included members from the Writers Group, such as Steve Chimombo. An attempt to relaunch the Malawi Writers Group in 2007 appears to have been largely unsuccessful.

== Publications ==
The Malawi Writers Group sought a variety of outlets for their creative work. Their earliest effort was Mau: 39 Poems from Malawi, an anthology of poems, which was published as a pamphlet in July 1971. It was printed by the Church of Africa Presbyterian's Hetherwick Press. Mau includes poems from 19 contributors and was reportedly well reviewed by Chinua Achebe.

Members of the Writers Group also published their works in various university journals and magazines, including Expression, Expression Supplement, Soche Hill, The Muse and Odi: A Journal of Malawi Literature.

The Muse was founded by Ken Lipenga and two other undergraduates as an extension of the Writers Group. Lipenga explains its purpose:

There are times in the Writers Workshop when you feel tongue-tied, overwhelmed by some superior voices, and you don't say anything; you are too shy to speak. The Muse then offers you an opportunity to express your views on the poem or short story that others were discussing. You have a chance, in other words, to put your views forward in another medium. Or there may be times, even after you have made your contribution to the discussion, when you feel there was something else you should have said, or something you could have said better. There is the opportunity to use The Muse to clarify your views, if you wish.

Odi was founded and edited by Mapanje, and was initially published between 1972 and 1974 before being revived in 1976. Intended as a quarterly publication, in reality it appeared when the censors allowed. Issues included a mixture of poetry, short stories, reviews and extracts of longer works in both English and Chichewa. Frank Chipasula, who served on the editorial board, notes that the very first issue ran into problems with the Government censor, which objected to specific sentences and words. This resulted in pages being reprinted and the magazine restapled. The first edition to appear in 1976 faced even more significant challenges. Robin Graham, one of its editors, intentionally bypassed the Censorship Board by not submitting all the intended content for review. The Board ultimately objected to two specific pieces: an article by Adrian Roscoe that referenced the exiled poet David Rubadiri, and a contribution by James Gibbs that described the internal machinery of Malawian censorship. This led to a formal investigation by the university, which led to Graham being deported from Malawi, and the majority of the copies of the journal's revival issue impounded and subsequently destroyed.

Interference from censors led to greater focus on international publishers and their efforts drew the attention of James Currey who tried to include Jack Mapanje's Of Chameleons and Gods as well as a Malawian poetry anthology in the Heinemann African Writers Series. However, it was only Mapanje's collection that was eventually published, for which the author expressed guilt. Mapanje even reviewed the unpublished anthology in the 1976 edition of Odi.

=== Malawian Writers Series ===
Malaŵian Writers Series logo from 1974, conforming to recently introduced Chichewa orthography.

The Group's most enduring publishing effort began in 1974 when some of its members approached the Montfort Press, a Catholic mission press that also operated a subsidiary known as Popular Publications. Despite broadening the scope of their work beyond religious texts, editorially the Press continued to focus on 'morally healthy publications'. Their decision to collaborate with the Malawi Writers Group was ambitious, and resulted in an editorial board made up of representatives from the university, Government, and private sector, and the creation of the Malaŵian Writers Series (sometimes referred to as the Malawian Writers Series, the Malawi Writers Series or Alembi a m'Malawi).

The visual identity of the series includes several distinctive features. This includes the Latin letter 'w' with circumflex in the word "Malaŵian", which reflects the linguistic climate of the early 1970s. In 1973 the Government's Chichewa Board published their New Chichewa Orthography, which introduced the 'ŵ' symbol to represent a bilabial fricative in standardised Chichewa. As such, its inclusion in the name of a series that began largely in the English language reflects the project's roots in a period of intense national identity-building and linguistic standardisation. In addition, the series' design reflected the visual identity of the African Writers Series.

Each release in the series was the result of discussions within the Malawi Writers Group, and the results often took the form of anthologies of folklore, poetry and plays and short stories. 29 titles had been published by 1991. Early releases were numbered, a system that appears to have been abandoned, and lists of previous publications included in new releases were sometimes incomplete.

A comparison of cover designs from the Malaŵian Writers Series and the African Writers Series, illustrating the visual influence of the Heinemann imprint.

The first release in the series was a collection of folklore in English, which was edited by Ellis Singano and Adrian Roscoe. Tales of Old Malaŵi (1974) was an immediate success, especially in secondary schools and teacher training colleges, and sold 1,300 copies in the first 2 years, which was regarded as a fair sale.

Numbers two and three in the series appeared in 1976 with Paul Tiyambe Zeleza's Night of Darkness and Other Stories and Nine Malaŵian Plays, which was edited by James Gibbs. Night of Darkness and Other Stories is an anthology of creative writing in English, released while Zeleza was still a student, that explores oral narratives.

Nine Malaŵian Plays is an anthology of plays in English. It includes contributions by James L. Ng'ombe (The Banana Tree; The Beauty of Dawn); Joe Mosiwa (Who Will Marry Our Daughter?); Enoch S. Timpuza Mvula (The Lizard's Tail); Chris F. Kamlongera (Graveyards; The Love Potion); Spencer Chunga and Hodges Likwembe (That Man is Evil); and Innocent O.H. Banda (Lord Have Mercy; Cracks). While the book has been cleared by the censors before publication, three weeks after release the Montfort Press was ordered to recall it and replace the introduction.

Steve Chimombo's play, The Rainmaker (1978) appeared next followed by Tito Banda's Sekani's Solution (1979), which was the first novel to appear in the series. Number six in the series was Ken Lipenga's short story collection, Waiting for a Turn, which appeared in 1981. The title story was written while Lipenga was still a student and won a prize in a British Council national competition. 1981 also saw the first publication in Chichewa with Enoch S. Timpunza Mvula's Akoma Akagonera. This was followed in 1982 with a Chichewa novel by Jolly Max Ntaba entitled Mwana wa Mnzako.

1985 saw the release of B.R. Rafael's A Short History of Malaŵi and J.M. Schoffeleers and Adrian Roscoe's Land of Fire: Oral Literature From Malaŵi. Land of Fire is a collection of translated oral narratives from the Sena, Chewa, Yao, Lomwe, Mang'anja and Tumbuka. It includes 11 chapters with themes including religious beliefs; kinship institutions; chieftaincy; sorcery; and family. James Gibbs considered that the Malaŵian Writers Series came of age with this release.

Further editions in the series followed with additional releases from Jolly Max Ntaba (Mtima Sukhuta, 1985) and Tito Banda (A Bitter Disapproval, 1987) as well as new authors including Francis P. B. Moto (Nzeru Umati Zako Nzokuuza, 1987) and Whyghtone Kamthunzi (Wachitatu Nkapasule, 1987).

== Reception and criticism ==
Critical reception to individual titles within the Malaŵian Writers Series was mixed, with many reviewers recommending the works for readers with a special interest in African literature only.

The broader role played by the Malawi Writers Group in beginning a 'second wave' of postcolonial Malawian literature and nurturing several publishing outlets for that work has received limited attention. However, within the scant analysis and review materials it is considered a pioneer.

Reflecting in 1996, Lupenga Mphande, one of the Group's founders and by then an associate professor in the department of African American and African Studies at The Ohio State University, concludes:

[The greatest success of the Malawi Writers Group] is the demonstration that politics and literature are intertwined, and that change, both in politics and in the curriculum, has to come from the bottom up; that it has to be initiated by civic society. The Malawi Writers Group is part of the process to build a new society out of an understanding of how improvements can follow from the goodness, commitment, and understanding of people working together, to change their lives and the lives of others.

But it is also clear that this success was limited by the conditions in which the Group operated, as John Lwanda makes clear:

The conjunction of a ‘Jane Austen’ English Departmental base, the Malawi censor and the influence of indigenous folk-tale/riddling idioms (kukuluwika) created what Angus Calder called ‘the finest body of poetry in English from Black Africa’ (Lwanda 1993). Various codes and metaphors added to the folk tale veneer. Inevitably, given the university base, elitist Malawi education, and the need to ‘riddle the censor’, the resulting literature excluded many unable to decipher it.

== Sources ==
- Banda, I.; Mapanje, J.; Chizeze, Z. J. (1985). "Writers Workshop: Poems: Poems". Index on Censorship. 14 (3): 34–36.
- Burness, Donald (1988). "A Bitter Disapproval (Review)". The African Book Publishing Record'. 14 (4): 253.
- Calder, Angus (1979). "Under Zomba Plateau: The New Malawian Poetry". Kunapipi. 1 (2): 60–67.
- Chimombo, Steve (1998). "Stories on Sapitwa: an overview of Lipenga's fiction". Journal of Humanities. 12 (1): 77–85.
- Chipasula, Frank (1983). "Four poems". Index on Censorship. 12 (6): 24–26.
- Currey, James (2008). Africa Writes Back: The African Writers Series and the Launch of African Literature. Oxford: James Currey.
- Englund, Harri (2004). "Gender Relations in African-Language Literature: Interpretative Politics and Possibilities". African Sociological Review / Revue Africaine de Sociologie. 8 (1): 154–175.
- Englund, Harri (2021). "Love and homophobia in Malawi's spoken-word poetry movement". Africa. 91 (3): 361–387.
- Gibbs, James (1986). "Land of Fire: Oral Literature from Malawi (Review)". World Literature Today. 60 (2): 352.
- Gibbs, James (1988). "Singing in the dark rain". Index on Censorship. 17 (2): 18–22.
- Gibbs, James (1991). "Book review: The Basket Girl by Steve Chimombo". Journal of Humanities (5). University of Malawi: 116–120.
- Kamlongera, Christopher Fadeson (1984). Problems in the growth of a popular art form: the relationship between drama and society in Malawi and Zambia (PhD). University of Leeds.
- Kerr, David; Mapanje, Jack (2002). "Academic Freedom and the University of Malawi". African Studies Review. 45 (2): 73–91.
- Killam, Gordon Douglas (1980). "Sekani's Solution (Review)". The African Book Publishing Record'. 6 (1): 24–25.
- Kishindo, Pascal J. (2001). "'Authority in language: The role of the Chichewa Board (1972-1995) in prescription and standardization of Chichewa'" (PDF). Journal of Asian and African Studies. 62: 261–283.
- Lee, Christopher J. (2010). "Malawian Literature after Banda and in the Age of AIDS: A Conversation with Steve Chimombo". Research in African Literatures. 41 (3): 33–48.
- Lindfors, Bernth (1987). "African Little Magazines". The African Book Publishing Record. 13 (2): 87–92.
- Lwanda, John (2008). "Poets, culture and orature: A reappraisal of the Malawi political public sphere, 1953–2006". Journal of Contemporary African Studies. 26 (1): 71–101.
- Macmillan, Hugh (June 2018). "Landeg White, 1940–2017". Journal of Southern African Studies. 44 (3): 531–535.
- Maluza, Paul Amadeus Paschal (1990). Publishing and Reading in Malawi: Problems and Prospects (Master's dissertation). Loughborough University of Technology.
- Mapanje, Jack (1989). "Censoring the African poem". Index on Censorship. 18 (9): 7–11.
- Mphande, Lupenga (1996). "Dr. Hastings Kamuzu Banda and the Malawi Writers Group: The (un)Making of a Cultural Tradition". Research in African Literatures. 27 (1): 80–101.
- Mphande, Lupenga (2000). "The Malawi Writers Group: Before and After Structural Adjustment Programs". In Federici, Silvia; Caffentzis, George; Alidou, Ousseina (eds.). A Thousand Flowers: Social Struggles Against Structural Adjustment in African Universities. Trenton, NJ: Africa World Press. pp. 181–195.
- Mwiyeriwa, Steve S. (1978). "Printing Presses and Publishing in Malaŵi". The Society of Malawi Journal. 31 (2): 31–53.
- Namponya, Clemence R. (1978). "History and Development of Printing and Publishing in Malawi". Libri. 28 (1): 167–181.
- Nazareth, Peter (1978). "Reviewed Work: Nine Malawian Plays by James Gibbs". World Literature Today. 52 (1): 165.
- Nichols, Lee, ed. (1981). Conversations with African Writers: Interviews with Twenty-six African Authors. Washington, D.C.: Voice of America.
- "Obituaries". The Society of Malawi Journal. 75 (1): 60–66. 2022.
- Roscoe, Adrian (2008). The Columbia Guide to Central African Literature in English Since 1945. New York: Columbia University Press.
- Vail, Leroy; White, Landeg (1990). "Of chameleons and paramount chiefs: the case of the Malawian poet Jack Mapanje". Review of African Political Economy. 17 (48): 26–49.
- Writers' Group (Chancellor College, University of Malawi) (1971). Mau: 39 Poems from Malawi (PDF). Blantyre, Malawi: Hetherwick Press.
- Zell, Hans M. (2024). "African Literary Journals and Little Magazines: An Inventory". The African Book Publishing Record. 50 (1): 7–29.
