= Steve Chimombo =

Malawian writer (1945–2015)

Steve Bernard Miles Chimombo (4 September 1945 – 11 December 2015) was a Malawian writer, poet, editor and teacher. He was born in Zomba.

== Life ==
He was educated at Zomba Catholic Secondary School, then at the University of Malawi where he earned a B.A and helped establish the Malawi Writers Group. At the University of Wales, he took a teaching diploma in English as a Second Language. At Columbia University in the United States, he was awarded his M.A. and Ph.D. in teaching. After studying at Leeds, England, Chimombo returned to Malawi to edit the literary bulletin Outlook-lookout.

He was a professor of English at Chancellor College in Malawi and was considered one of the nation's leading writers. In 1988 his Napolo Poems gained him honorable mention for the Noma Award for Publishing in Africa. He was married to Moira Chimombo.

The poet Stanley Onjezani Kenani wrote the following appreciation of Chimombo: "Except for J.W. Gwengwe, D.D. Phiri, Jack Mapanje, and Francis Chipasula, I cannot think of any Malawian who has contributed more to Malawian literature than Prof. Chimombo."

== Death ==
He died at the age of 70 on 11 December 2015 in Blantyre.

== Works ==
=== Poetry ===
- Napolo Poems, Manchichi Publishers, 1987
- Python! Python! An Epic Poem, Wasi Publications, 1992
- Napolo and the Python, Heinemann Educational Publishers, 1994, ISBN 978-0-435-91199-7

=== Plays ===
- The Rainmaker (1975)
- Wachiona Ndani? (1983)

=== Novels ===
- The Basket Girl, Popular Publications, 1990
- The Wrath of Napolo, Wasi Publications, 2000, ISBN 978-99908-48-06-9

=== Children's literature ===
- The Bird Boy's Song, Wasi Publications, 2002, ISBN 978-99908-48-07-6

=== Short stories ===
- The Hyena Wears Darkness (2006)

=== Nonfiction ===
- Malawian Oral Literature: The Aesthetics of Indigenous Arts (1988)
- The Culture of Democracy: Language, Literature, the Arts and Politics in Malawi, 1992–94 (1996)

=== Anthologies ===
- Chinua Achebe; Catherine Lynette Innes, eds. (1992). "The rubbish dump". The Heinemann book of contemporary African short stories. Heinemann. p. 72. ISBN 978-0-435-90566-8. "Steve Chimombo."
- Gerald Moore; Ulli Beier, eds. (2007). "Napolo: the message". The Penguin Book of Modern African Poetry. Translated by Gerald Moore; Ulli Beier. Penguin. ISBN 978-0-14-042472-0.
