= Aubrey Kachingwe =

Malawian novelist and journalist (born 1926)

- Aubrey Kachingwe in the mid-1960s
- Born: 27 November 1926; Blantyre, Nyasaland (now Malawi)
- Occupations: Journalist, novelist
- Writing career
- Notable work: No Easy Task (1965)

Aubrey Kachingwe (born 27 November 1926, date of death unknown) was a Malawian novelist and journalist. He is best known for his 1965 novel No Easy Task, which was the first work by a Malawian author to be included in the Heinemann African Writers Series. Kachingwe also held positions with broadcasters in Malawi, England and Ghana before moving into a career in business.

== Background ==
Aubrey Kachingwe was born in Blantyre, Nyasaland (now Malawi), on 27 November 1926. He was educated in Malawi and Tanganyika (now Tanzania) and after his studies he pursued journalism, inspired by his uncle, Charles Wesley Mlanga, who was an editor at the local The Times newspaper. In 1950, he moved to Kenya and worked at the East African Standard in Nairobi before returning to Nyasaland in 1954 to work in public relations. The next year, he moved to London to study journalism and to work on the foreign affairs desk of the Daily Herald before returning to Nyasaland to work at the Department of Information and as a Reuters correspondent. In 1963, he returned to London to work as a radio journalist at the BBC African Service, before working for Ghana's national radio in Accra. Kachingwe returned home to become Head of News with the Malawi Broadcasting Corporation in the newly independent nation. In his later years, Kachingwe moved into business, rearing pigs and cattle on his farm and running a laundry.

By 2011, he was frail and had lost interest in writing. In 2019, it was noted that he was deceased.

== Works ==
Aubrey Kachingwe began writing short stories, which appeared in the East African Standard and elsewhere, to supplement his income:

It was a fast way of making money. That explains why I never had the ambition to publish my short stories in book form – I preferred submitting them to newspapers and magazines because that way I made money quickly. Kachingwe speaking in 2011

Kachingwe's primary literary legacy rests on his only novel, No Easy Task (1965). He submitted the manuscript via the Nyasaland Publications and Literature Bureau to Heinemann:

It was because of short story writing that some white people advised me to write a book manuscript and submit it to the African Writers Series, which at that time was looking for materials to publish. This was after they had been impressed with a short story I published in one of the international magazines. Kachingwe speaking in 2011

The manuscript was received a few months before independence, which was seen as timely, and was released in hardback at a launch on 24 January 1965 at the British Council in Zomba. The decision to initially release the novel in hardback, rather than as a cheaper paperback in the African Writers Series, limited sales with Heinemann representatives reporting in October 1965:

The people of Malawi are looking forward to his book but the subscription of the 18/- edition was unenthusiastic, every bookshop stating that they would buy the AWS title.

No Easy Task duly appeared as number 24 in the African Writers Series in 1966, a year before David Rubadiri’s No Bride Price and two years before Legson Kayira’s The Looming Shadow.

Set in the fictional British colony of Kwacha, the novel follows Jo Jozeni, a young journalist who navigates the mounting tensions of a nationalist movement. The work is often described as semi-autobiographical, reflecting Kachingwe's own professional trajectory from village life to international journalism.

Critical reception to the novel was mixed. Academic critics including Bardolph, Gikandi, Lindfors, Reed, and Roscoe largely praise its sober reporting and avoidance of stereotypes via the creation of nuanced characters, albeit with sometimes stilted dialogue or 'jerky newspeak'. Claude Wauthier, who interviewed Kachingwe in 1967, stresses Kachingwe efforts to portray the ambiguities of political power. A markedly different review was published by Paul Theroux in 1966. Theroux had served as a Peace Corps volunteer, but was expelled from Malawi in late 1965, and subsequently thrown out of the Peace Corps, for helping David Rubadiri, a political opponent of the newly elected Hastings Kamuzu Banda. In his scathing review, he calls the novel "disingenuous" and "fraudulent" for failing to document the political violence he witnessed in Malawi at the time.

By 1967 Kachingwe was reportedly working on a second novel titled Signs of the Gathering Storm regarding the Mau Mau rebellion, while the introduction to his 1968 short story, My Beautiful Fig, notes that it was to form part of a collection of short stories. Neither of these were ever published, while efforts to involve him in the Malawi Writers Group in the early 1970s were unsuccessful, as he was unsure of what the repercussions would be on his career.

== Published works ==
- Kachingwe, Aubrey (1965). No Easy Task. London: Heinemann. OCLC 1351505.
- —— (1968). "My Beautiful Fig". African Arts. 1 (4): 62–64.

== Sources ==
- Bardolph, J (1994). "Aubrey Kachingwe". In Benson, Eugene; Connolly, L. W. (eds.). Encyclopaedia of Post-Colonial Literatures in English. London: Routledge.
- Błachnio, J. (2013). "Kachingwe, Aubrey, 1926–". ProQuest. Ann Arbor: ProQuest.
- Currey, James (2008). Africa Writes Back: The African Writers Series and the Launch of African Literature. Oxford: James Currey.
- Gikandi, Simon, ed. (2003). Encyclopedia of African Literature. London: Routledge. ISBN 978-0-415-23019-3.
- Jahn, Janheinz (1972). Who's Who in African Literature. Tübingen: Horst Erdmann Verlag. ISBN 3-7711-0153-0.
- Lindfors, Bernth (1967). "Review: No Easy Task by Aubrey Kachingwe". Books Abroad (Review). 41 (3): 366.
- Mgunda, Temwani (11 December 2011). "Aubrey Kachingwe: One among literary greats". The Sunday Times. Blantyre, Malawi: Blantyre Newspapers Limited. Archived from the original on 18 May 2013.
- Mphande, Lupenga (1996). "Dr. Hastings Kamuzu Banda and the Malawi Writers Group: The (un)Making of a Cultural Tradition". Research in African Literatures. 27 (1): 80–101.
- Reed, John (1966). "Reviews: First Malawian and Gambian Novels". The Journal of Commonwealth Literature (Review of No Easy Task by Aubrey Kachingwe and The Second Round by Lenrie Peters). 1 (2): 172–173.
- Roscoe, Adrian (2008). The Columbia Guide to Central African Literature in English Since 1945. New York: Columbia University Press.
- Theroux, Paul (1966). "Review: No Easy Myths". Transition (Review of No Easy Task by Aubrey Kachingwe) (25): 51.
- Theroux, Paul (2003). Dark Star Safari: Overland from Cairo to Cape Town. Boston: Houghton Mifflin.
- Wauthier, Claude (1967). "Review: No Easy Task by Aubrey Kachingwe; I Will Try by Legson Kayira". Présence Africaine (Review) (61): 241–243.
