= Matilda Phiri =

Matilda Phiri is a Malawian writer.

== Life ==
The first born of two children, Phiri attended primary school at Misesa in Blantyre. She recalls being attracted to folktales at that time.

In 2015 she was shortlisted and she became the first woman to win the Peer Gynt Children’s Book Manuscript Contest run by the Malawi Writers Union. Her winning entry, subsequently published as Grace the Village Girl (2018), had been originally written when she was seventeen.

== Works ==
- Grace the Village Girl. Malawi National Archive, 2018. ISBN 978-9996040368
- Chidaliro and his Sisters. 2023. ISBN 978-9990808353
