= Francis Moto =

Malawian writer, academic, and diplomat

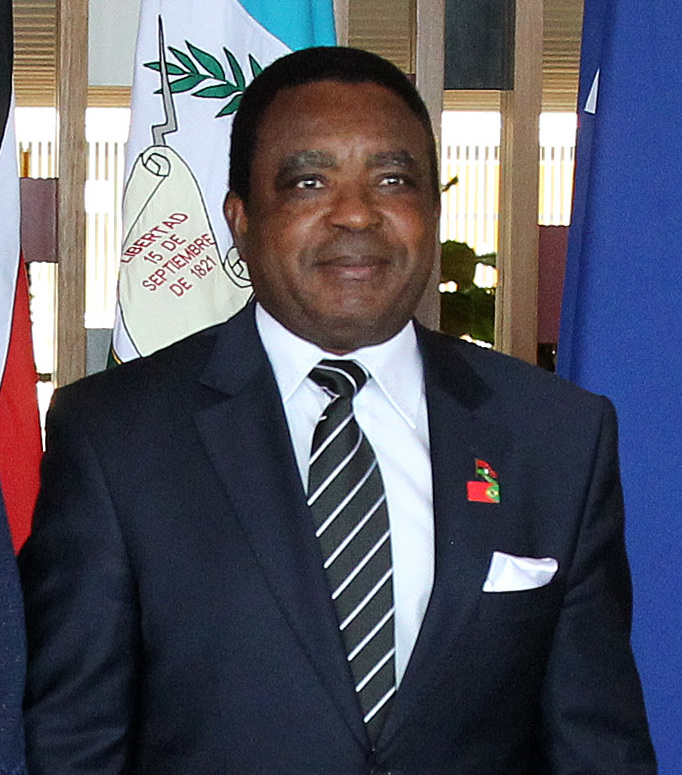
Moto in 2011

Professor Francis P. B. Moto (born 1952) is a Malawian writer, academic, and diplomat. He was the Principal of Chancellor College and then the ambassador to the UK and then Brazil. His original home is Golomoti in the Dedza District of Malawi.

== Life ==
Moto was born in 1952 and he attended secondary school in Chichiri in Blantyre before he was admitted to the University of Malawi in 1972, obtaining a degree in linguistics in 1977. While there, he participated in the Malawi Writers Group.

From 1978-1980 Francis Moto studied at the School of Oriental and African Studies (SOAS) in London, obtaining an MA in linguistics. He was awarded a PhD from University College London in 1989. From 1990-93, he served as Education Attaché of Malawi in London. Later he worked as lecturer in Chichewa and linguistics at Chancellor College (part of the University of Malawi). From 1998-2005 he was Principal of Chancellor College.

In 2005, following disturbances at the university, Moto was removed as Principal by the then President of Malawi Bingu wa Mutharika. He was subsequently appointed High Commissioner of Malawi in London from 2005–10, and later served as the first Ambassador of Malawi in Brazil from 2011–15.

Moto's book Trends in Malawi Literature (2001) has been the subject of a detailed critique by Professor Harri Englund of the University of Cambridge.

== Publications ==
- Moto, F. (1979). "Red Mask Dancer of Golomoti: an Interpretation". unpublished paper for University College, London.
- Moto, F. (1981). (Five poems in the Chichewa language). In: Enoch Mvula (ed.) Akoma Akagonera. Popular Publications, Limbe.
- Mchombo, S. A., & Moto, F. (1981). "Tone and the Theory of Syntax". Studies in African Linguistics, Supplement 8, 92-95.
- Moto, F. (1983). "Aspects of tone assignment in Chichewa", Journal of Contemporary African Studies, 3: 1, 199-209 (1983).
- Moto, F. (1986). "The effects of literacy on an orally-based society". Oral Tradition and Literacy: Changing Visions of the World (Durban: Natal University Oral Documentation and Research Centre) pp, 282–289.
- Moto, F. (1987). Nzeru Umati Zako Nzokuuza ("The wisdom you say is yours is the things they tell you") Popular Publications, Limbe; a collection of eleven short stories in the Chichewa language.
- Moto, F. (1987). "A note on tonal mobility in Chichewa". Journal of Humanities, 1(1), 65–74.
- Moto, F. (1989). Phonology of the Bantu Lexicon. Doctoral Dissertation, University College London.
- Moto, F. (1994). Gazing at the Setting Sun. Zomba: FEGS Publications International. (Poetry in English. Reviewed by Mthatiwa, S. (2020). "Allusiveness, Language and Imagery in Francis Moto's Gazing at The Setting Sun]. Journal of Law and Social Sciences, 3(1), 52-67).
- Moto, F. (1994). The Nyau Secret Society. Towards Inculturation of Religious Life. ARIMA. pp 22–25.
- Harris, J., & Moto, F. (1994). "Bantu height harmony: monovalency and opacity". Ms. University College London. Reviewed by Mthatiwa, S. (2020). "Allusiveness, Language and Imagery in Francis Moto's Gazing at The Setting Sun. Journal of Law and Social Sciences, 3(1), 52-67; vet.unza.zm.
- Moto, F. (1997). "Cyclicity in Bantu: Evidence from Chichewa". Journal of Humanities, 10(1), 45–54.
- Moto, F. (1998). "Burying political commentary in animal metaphor: a study of Malunga's Makangano a Nyama". Tizame, Issue No. 6, (1998), pp. 24–27.
- Moto, F. (1998). "Towards a study of swearing in Malawi". Southern African Journal for Folklore Studies, 9(1), 6–12.
- Moto, F. (1998). "Domesticating the definition of democracy". Bwalo, (2), 24–43.
- Moto, F. (1999). "The tonal phonology of Bantu ideophones". Malilime: The Malawian Journal of Linguistics, (1999), no.1, 100-120.
- Moto, F. (1999). "Language in education and the democratic transition in Malawi". Lessons in hope: education for democracy in Malawi. Zomba: Chancellor College Publications, 61–72.
- Moto, F. (2000). "The semantics of poetic and dramatic works : the case of Mapanje and Chimombo". Paper to be presented at the.International Conference on Historical and Social Science Research in Malawi : Problems and Prospects.
- Moto, F. (2000). "African languages and poverty alleviation: Lessons from Malawi". In: 1st international conference on indigenous African languages. Kisumu, Kenya (pp. 10–12).
- Moto, F. (2001). Trends in Malawian Literature. Chancellor College Publishers. ISBN 9789990851182. (Reviewed in: Mthatiwa, D. S. (2003). "Book Review: Leveling the Ground in Chichewa Literature: Francis Moto's Trends in Malawian Literature". Journal of Humanities, 17.)
- Moto, F. (2001). "Language and Societal Attitudes: A Study of Malawi's 'New Language'". Nordic Journal of African Studies 10(3): 320-343.
- Moto, F. (2002). "African language and the crisis of identity: The Case of Malawi". Speaking African languages for education and development, 33–44.
- Moto, F. (2004). "Towards a Study of the Lexicon of Sex and HIV/AIDS" Nordic Journal of African Studies 13(3): 343–362.
- Moto, F. (2004). "LIMITING LINGUISTIC FREEDOM: THE CASE OF MALAWI". In: Making Multilingual Education a Reality for All: Operationalizing Good Intentions: Proceedings of the Joint Third International Conference of the Association for the Development of African Languages in Education, Science and Technology (ADALEST) and the Fifth Malawian National Language Symposium Held at Mangochi, Malawi, 30 August–03 September 2004 (p. 59). University of Malawi, Centre for Language Studies.
- Moto, F. (2008). "ATTITUDES TOWARDS AFRICAN LANGUAGES AND AFRICAN-LANGUAGE LITERATURES IN EDUCATION: THE CASE OF MALAWI". Beyond the Language Issue: The Production, Mediation and Reception of Creative Writing in African Languages: Selected Papers from the 8th International Janheinz Jahn Symposium, Mainz 2004, 19, 153.
- Moto, F. (2008). The Context and Language of Jack Mapanje's Poetry. Centre for Advanced Studies of African Society. ISBN 9781920294649.
- Moto, F. (2008). "THOMSON JACOB "JAKE" XANDER MUWAMBA". The Society of Malawi Journal, 61(1), 64–66.
- Moto, F. (2009). Language, Power and Society. Unisa Press. ISBN 9781868884346.
