= Ndongolera Mwangupili =

Malawian poet and writer

Ndongolera C. Mwangupili
- Born: 1977 (age 48–49)
- Citizenship: Malawi
- Occupation: Educator
- Notable work: Sons of the Hills

Ndongolera C. Mwangupili (born 1977) is a poet, fiction writer, academic and essayist from Malawi.

== Career ==
Many of Mwangupili's poems short stories, and essays have appeared in local newspapers and anthologies. His stories are published in Modern Stories from Malawi (2003) and The Bachelor of Chikanda and Other Stories (2009). His poem "The Genesis" was anthologized in The Time Traveller of Maravi: New Poetry from Malawi (2011) and it was translated into French and published in Florilege No 177 December 2019.

Another popular poem of his is "Letters to a Comrade". His poem "Songs of a Peasant" was published in The Criterion: An International Journal in English, ISSN (0976-8165) Vol. 5 Issue VI (December 2014). "For the Unmarked Tomb" is published in a chapbook by Praxis Magazine Online (2017). His three poems were anthologized in Free Fall: An International Anthology (2017). "The Mushunguti Tree" is translated into Spanish as "El Mushunguti" and published in Arbolarium Antologia Poetica Delos Cinco Continentes (2019).

He edited two books: Poetry for Malawian Senior Secondary Schools (2014) and Call it Fate and Other Short Stories (2014).

His book English Language for MSCE: Comprehension, Summary, Note-making and Composition (2014) is used in the Malawi secondary school curriculum as a reference book.

One of Mwangupili's poems, "My Love, My Woman", was published in 2014 in Belgium in a collection titled The Aquillrelle Wall of Poetry of Passion and Romance, Members' Anthology.

Mwangupili has also published articles on theological subjects.

Mwangupili works as a senior inspector of schools in Malawi. He is a founding member of Malawi Union of Academic and Non-fiction Authors (MUANA) and has served as Vice President and Secretary General. He is the current President. His paper "Strategic Alliance Through Writers' Union: Challenges and Lessons from MUANA" is published in the book Building Capacity for Sustainable Academic and Nonfiction Authorship in Africa (2018).

In 2004, he was one of the writers in Africa who took part in Crossingborder Project under British Council.

A Gift to the People: Sr. Beatrice Chipeta's Legacy (2020) is a short biography he authored in 2020.

He also has a collection of his poems (over 50 of them) in a book titled Fragments of My Broken Voice. The book is a new wave of African poetry from Malawi. 'Sons of the Hills' is his first novel to be published that has politics, economics, culture and love as major themes. In 2025 he was awarded Honorary Fellow in Writing by the University of Iowa after attending the International Writing Program (IWP).
