= Harri Englund =

Harri Englund (born 1966) is Professor of Social Anthropology at the University of Cambridge, Fellow of the British Academy and of Churchill College, Cambridge. Englund studied anthropology at the University of Helsinki and the University of Manchester. After holding academic posts in the United Kingdom, Sweden and Finland, Englund moved to the University of Cambridge in 2004. He was promoted to professorship in 2014 and elected a Fellow of the British Academy in 2019. Englund's field research has taken place in Malawi, Mozambique, Zambia and Finland. His publications have addressed topics such as human rights, humanitarianism, and moral and political thought in the Chichewa language. He has also studied the racial and humanitarian politics of Christian missions in 19th-century Malawi including the missionary David Clement Scott. In 2006, the Royal Anthropological Institute awarded the Amaury Talbot Prize to his book Prisoners of Freedom: Human Rights and the African Poor.

== Books ==
- Visions for Racial Equality: David Clement Scott and the Struggle for Justice in Nineteenth-Century Malawi.
- Gogo Breeze: Zambia's Radio Elder and the Voices of Free Speech.
- Human Rights and African Airwaves: Mediating Equality on the Chichewa Radio.
- Christianity and Public Culture in Africa.
- Prisoners of Freedom: Human Rights and the African Poor.
- Rights and the Politics of Recognition in Africa.
- From War to Peace on the Mozambique-Malawi Borderland.
- A Democracy of Chameleons: Politics and Culture in the New Malawi.
