= Malawi Writers Union =

National association of writers in Malawi

- Abbreviation: MAWU
- Formation: 1995
- Founder: Group of Malawian authors and poets
- Type: Non-governmental organization
- Legal status: Active
- Purpose: Promotion of creative writing and literature in Malawi
- Headquarters: Blantyre, Malawi
- Region served: Malawi
- Members: Over 200 members (2025 estimate)
- Official language: English, Chichewa, Chitumbuka and other Malawian languages
- President: Alfred Msadala (as of 2025)
- Main organ: General Assembly
- Parent organization: Ministry of Tourism, Culture and Wildlife (affiliated)
- Affiliations: Pan African Writers Association

The Malawi Writers Union (MAWU) is a national association of writers in Malawi that was established in 1995 to promote creative writing, literacy, and the development of Malawian authors. The Union provides a platform for the writers of different genres such as fiction, poetry, drama, and non-fiction to exchange ideas, publish their works, and advocate for policies that support the literary arts.
