= Paul Tiyambe Zeleza =

Malawian historian

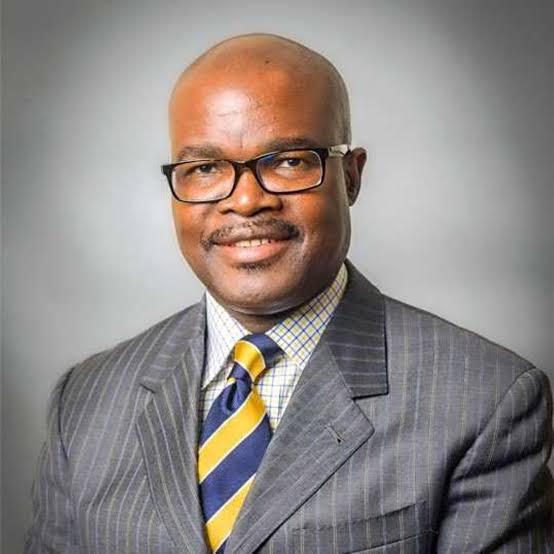
- Born: 25 May 1955 (age 71); Salisbury, Southern Rhodesia (today Harare, Zimbabwe)

Academic background
- Education: University of Malawi (BA); University of London (MA); Dalhousie University (PhD)

Academic work
- Discipline: Historian
- Sub-discipline: African historian, economic historian
- Institutions: University of the West Indies; Kenyatta University; Dalhousie University; Trent University; University of Illinois at Urbana–Champaign; Pennsylvania State University; University of Illinois at Chicago; Loyola Marymount University; Quinnipiac University; United States International University Africa

Paul Tiyambe Zeleza (born 25 May 1955) is a Malawian historian, literary critic, novelist, short-story writer and blogger at The Zeleza Post. He was (2009) president of the African Studies Association. He was the vice-president for academic affairs at Quinnipiac University. He served as vice chancellor of the United States International University Africa from 2016 to 2021, located in Nairobi, Kenya. He served as associate provost and North Star Distinguished Professor at Case Western Reserve University in Cleveland, Ohio, from 2021 to 2023, and was appointed to his current position as senior advisor for strategic initiatives at Howard University in October 2023.

== Personal background ==
Zeleza was born on 25 May 1955 in Salisbury, Southern Rhodesia (today Harare, Zimbabwe) to Malawian parents. His family returned to Nyasaland (today Malawi) in 1956, before returning to Rhodesia in 1972. Zeleza attended primary school (1961–1968) and secondary school (1968–1972) in the cities of Lilongwe and Blantyre in Malawi. He matriculated at the University of Malawi, majoring in English and History and earning a Bachelor of Arts with Distinction in 1976. He then served as a staff associate at the University of Malawi's Chancellor College from 1976 to 1977 before going to the United Kingdom for graduate school. He studied at the University of London's School of Oriental & African Studies and the London School of Economics, earning a Master of Arts in African History and International Relations in 1978. He went on to earn his Doctor of Philosophy in Economic History from Dalhousie University in Halifax, Nova Scotia, Canada, in 1982.

== Work experience ==
Upon completing his PhD in 1982, Zeleza took up an appointment as a lecturer in the department of history at the University of the West Indies in Kingston, Jamaica, where he spent two years. In August 1984, he relocated to Kenyatta University in Nairobi, Kenya, the country on which he had done his PhD dissertation and where he had spent a year between 1979 and 1980 conducting research. At Kenyatta, he taught African economic history and began the extensive research that would eventually result in his award-winning book, A Modern Economic History of Africa. He was promoted from the position of lecturer to senior lecturer in 1987.

In January 1990, Zeleza left Kenyatta University to work on his research of African economic history, which took him to the United Nations Economic Commission for Africa in Addis Ababa, Ethiopia, and his alma mater, Dalhousie University in Canada, where he spent the next six months conducting research. In July 1990, he relocated to Trent University in Peterborough, Ontario, Canada, where he was appointed assistant professor in the department of history. A year later he received tenure and was promoted to associate professor, and three years later to full professor. In 1994 he was also appointed principal of Lady Eaton College, one of the five constituent colleges of Trent University, as well as acting director of the university's International Program.

In August 1995, Zeleza was recruited to become director of the Center for African Studies and professor of history and African studies at the University of Illinois at Urbana–Champaign in the United States, where he spent the next eight years and where he produced some of his most important academic work. In August 2003, he relocated to Pennsylvania State University where he was served as a professor in the departments of history and African and African American studies.

On 1 January 2007 he became professor and head, Department of African American Studies at the University of Illinois at Chicago.

On 1 August 2009 he assumed his new role as dean of the Bellarmine College of Liberal Arts at Loyola Marymount University in Los Angeles.

On 22 July 2013, Zeleza was appointed as the vice-president for academic affairs at Quinnipiac University. On 16 September 2015, Zeleza was appointed as the vice-chancellor of the United States International University Africa in Kenya with effect on 1 January 2016.

== Research and scholarship ==
Zeleza writes about African economic history. His book A Modern Economic History of Africa won the 1994 Noma Award for Publishing in Africa. The jury citation noted:

The book is an exercise in historical reconstruction, and its strength and distinction above all lies in its bold and convincing challenge to hitherto accepted orthodoxies, terminologies, and interpretations, about the nature and development of African societies and economies. The book is an outstanding, pioneering work, destined to become highly influential, and providing such a wealth of information and detail as to elevate the study of African economic history to a new pedestal.

Over the years, Zeleza has also established himself as a leading intellectual historian of Africa, with influential publications on the development of ideas and higher education institutions. His scholarly output and reputation also extends to gender studies, human rights studies and diaspora studies. In 2003, he was appointed by the United Nations Research Institute for Social Development (UNRISD) to a nine-member advisory board to oversee the publication of "Gender Equality: Striving for Justice in an Unequal World", a research study issued to mark the 10th anniversary of, and assess progress since, the United Nations' Fourth World Conference on Women, held in Beijing in September 1995.

He is currently working on a project, "Africa and Its Diasporas: Dispersals and Linkages", that seeks to trace the dispersal of African peoples globally (Asia, Europe, and the Americas), the formation of African diasporas in different world regions, and the linkages established between these diasporas and Africa over the centuries. The project is funded by a $200,000 grant from the Ford Foundation.

Zeleza is frequently invited as a keynote speaker at international conferences and to give public lectures across the world. Among the numerous conferences where he has given keynote addresses are those organised by UNESCO in Paris in December 2003 and the Association of African Universities in Cape Town in February 2005. In 1995, he was one of six African intellectuals invited by the Japanese government for a three-week tour of Japan, and he revisited several Japanese universities in 2004 at the invitation of the Japanese Association of African Studies. In Asia, he has also visited China and South Korea, and in Europe, he has been invited to France, Germany, Sweden, Norway, Italy, Britain, Switzerland, and the Netherlands, while in the Americas he has been to several Caribbean islands, Venezuela and Brazil. As for Africa, he has been invited to and visited more than twenty countries, from Egypt to South Africa. In 2006, he was appointed honorary visiting professor in the Department of Historical Studies, the African Gender Institute, and the Center for African Studies at the University of Cape Town.

== Literary work ==
Zeleza is also a renowned writer of fiction. He is the author of three books, two collections of short stories, Night of Darkness and Other Stories (Malawian Writers Series No 2, Montfort Press, Limbe, 1976), and The Joys of Exile: Stories (Anansi: Toronto, 1994), and a novel, Smouldering Charcoal (Oxford: Heinemann, 1992).

He has also published critical essays on African literature and postcolonial criticism. Among the authors whose works he has examined are Edward Said and Yvonne Vera.

== Partial bibliography ==
Zeleza is the author of several articles and essays and more than two dozen books, including the following:

- "The Transformation of Global Higher Education, 1945-2015." (New York: Palgrave amacmillan, 2016).
- "Africa's Resurgence: Domestic, Global and Diaspora Transformations." (Los Angeles: Tsehai Publishers, 2014).
- "In Search of African Diasporas: Testimonies and Encounters." (Durham, NC: Carolina Academic Press, 2012).
- "Barack Obama and African Diasporas: Dialogues and Dissensions." (Anthens, OH: Ohio University Press, 2009).
- The Roots of African Conflicts: The Causes and Costs (Oxford: James Currey, Athens: Ohio University Press, 2008).
- The Management of African Conflicts: The Management of Conflict Resolution in Africa and Post-Conflict Reconstruction. (Oxford: James Currey, Athens: Ohio University Press, 2008).
- The Study of Africa Volume 1: Disciplinary and Interdisciplinary Encounters; Volume 2: Transnational and Global Engagements. (Dakar: Codesria Book Series, 2006–7).
- African Universities in the Twenty-First Century Volume 1: Liberalization and Internationalization; Volume 2: Knowledge and Society (Dakar: Codesria Book Series, 2004).
- Human Rights, the Rule of Law and Development in Africa (Philadelphia: University of Pennsylvania Press, 2004).
- Rethinking Africa's Globalization Volume 1: The Intellectual Challenges (Trenton, NJ: Africa World Press, 2003).
- In Search of Modernity: Science and Technology in Africa (Trenton, NJ: Africa World Press, 2003).
- Leisure in Urban Africa (Trenton, NJ: Africa World Press, 2003).
- Encyclopedia of Twentieth Century African History (London and New York: Routledge, 2002).
- "Manufacturing African Studies and Crises." (Dakar: Codesria Book Series, 1998).
- "An Economic History of Africa. Vol I: The Nineteenth Century." (Dakar: Codesria Book Series, 1993).
- "Joys of Exile: Stories." (Toronto: Anansi, 1994).
- "Smouldering Charcoal." (Oxford: Heinemann, 1992).
- New Dictionary of the History of Ideas (New York: Charles Scribner's Sons, 2005). (associate editor).

== Awards and grants ==
Zeleza is the winner of the 1994 Noma Award for his book A Modern Economic History of Africa and the 1998 Special Commendation of the Noma Award for Manufacturing African Studies and Crises. He is also the recipient of Choice Outstanding Academic Title, 2003; Honorable Mention, Conover-Porter Award, 2004; and of numerous grants from the Ford Foundation, Rockefeller Foundation, Carnegie Corporation of New York, the Friedrich Ebert Foundation, US Department of Education Title VI, National Endowment for the Humanities, Canada Social Science and Humanities Research Council, and the Council for the Development of Social Science Research in Africa. Recently he received the 2006 Penn State College of Liberal Arts Class of 1933 Distinction in the Humanities Award.
