= Willie Zingani =

Malawian novelist, poet and playwright (1954–2024)

Willie T. Zingani (14 March 1954 – 31 August 2024) was a Malawian novelist, poet, playwright and journalist.

== Life and career ==
Zingani was the son of the late Rev. Maxwell Zingani, a primary school teacher and voluntary Anglican priest. After leaving school he was awarded a scholarship to study journalism at the Africa Literature Centre in Zambia. He later attended a Publishing and Public Relations course at Oxford Brookes University in the United Kingdom.

He began his career in journalism in 1982, working as a features writer for the Malawi News newspaper, but for a time was put in prison by the regime of President Hastings Kamuzu Banda because of an article he had allegedly written. Before leaving the newspaper he had risen to the post of editor.

Under the government of President Bakili Muluzi he got a job in the Ministry of Information where, after a year of editing the Government weekly news he helped the President research his book Democracy With a Price. After this he served as Deputy Presidential Press Secretary, then as Presidential Press Secretary until 2004.

After a period of unemployment he briefly became editor of the Guardian newspaper and in 2009-10 worked in the office of Vice President Joyce Banda. From 2010 until his retirement in 2014 he was corporate services manager at the Limbe Leaf tobacco company. He was the brother of Barnaba Zingani, who is himself a published author in both Chichewa and English.

Zingani died in Lilongwe on 31 August 2024, at the age of 70. He was survived by six children.

== Publications ==
Willie Zingani has written 6 short novels or story collections in the Chichewa language and two in English. These are:

- Ndaziona ine "I have Seen Troubles"
- Madzi Akatayika "When Water is Spilt" (1984)
- Njala Bwana "Hunger, Sir!" (1984)
- Nkhondo Simanga Mudzi "War Doesn't make a Country"
- Idzani Muone "Come and See"
- Khwangwala Opusa ndi nkhani zina "The Stupid Crow and other tales"
- The Phone Booth
- The Preacher and the Joker (1988)

One of his books, Madzi Akataika, was turned into a play, which was directed by Willie Zingani. He has also had poems published in anthologies in various countries.

Two of Zingani's novels, Madzi Akatayika and Njala Bwana, were discussed in a work by Professor Francis Moto in 2001, which has itself been the subject of a detailed critique by Professor Harri Englund of Cambridge University defending Zingani.
