= Benedicto Wokomaatani Malunga =

Malawian writer (born 1962)

- Born: 1962; Chichewa, Malawi
- Other name: Ben Malunga
- Education: University of Malawi (BA); University of Manchester (MA)

Benedicto Wokomaatani (Note: The name Wokomaatani, sometimes spelled 'Okomaatani' or 'Okoma Atani' in newspaper articles, comes from a proverb (W)okoma atani onga fumbwe? 'What have good people done like the civet?' It is based on a folk tale about a harmless civet who was annoyed to see a criminal leopard being given greater honours than himself (as retold in the Indiana University Chichewa Recorded Materials Archive).) Malunga (born in 1962), also known as Ben Malunga, is a Malawian poet, writing in the Chichewa language. He is also a short-story writer, an essayist, a music composer, public speaker, and translator who has translated Chinua Achebe's Things Fall Apart into Chichewa under the title Chipasupasu. Malunga holds a bachelor's degree from Chancellor College of the University of Malawi (1986) and an MA from University of Manchester (1996) in the UK. He is currently working as Registrar for the University of Malawi and Secretary of the University of Malawi Council.

Although born in Chikwawa in the south of Malawi, he was brought up from a young age in the village of Chabwera in Machinga District. He attended Malosa Secondary School near Zomba.

Malunga is the author of three collections of poems (see Bibliography). In 2002 the World Intellectual Property Organization (WIPO) honoured him with an award for his creativity. As the University of Malawi turned 50 in 2015, he composed its first ever anthem. Some of his poems, including Ndine yemwe uja, have also been turned into songs by Billy Kaunda.

In an interview in 2010, the poet Stanley Onjezani Kenani referred to Malunga as "Malawi's most famous poet". He added: "Jack Mapanje is the most famous poet internationally. But when you talk of poetry in Malawi, in the villages, everywhere, the household name is Benedicto Malunga." With a colleague Gospel Kazako, Malunga recorded the first Malawian cassette of poetry called Taimbani Alakatuli which was later followed by Ndidzakutengera Kunyanja Ligineti Ndi Ndakatulo Zina. His compact disc titled Siananso Awa is regularly aired by various radio stations in Malawi. Some of his short stories have appeared in the African Studies journal Ufahamu published by the University of California.

One of Malunga's poems, Misozi ya Chumba ('The Tears of the Barren Woman'), which puts into words the feelings of a woman unable to have children, was set for comment in the 2010 Chichewa International Baccalaureate exam. This is an example of the social issues which Malunga's poetry tackles.

== Bibliography ==
- Ndidzakutengera kunyanja Ligineti: ndi ndakatulo zina ('I shall take you to the Lake, Ligineti and other poems') (2001). (Chancellor College Publications, 2001). ISBN 9789990851281
- Kuimba Kwa Mlakatuli ('The Singing of the Poet') (1990) (revised edition, CLAIM Malawi, 2003).
- Chipasupasu (a translation of Chinua Achebe's Things Fall Apart), Chancellor College Publications, Zomba (2004). ISBN 9789990851359.
- Mawu Koma Awa ndi ndakatulo zina ('These Are The Words and other poems'), Chancellor College Publications, Zomba (2011). ISBN 9789996023033.
