= Desmond Dudwa Phiri =

Malawian author, economist, and historian

- Born: February 23, 1931; Mzimba, Malawi
- Died: 24 March 2019 (aged 88)
- Citizenship: Malawi
- Education: London School of Economics
- Occupation: Author

Desmond Dudwa Phiri, commonly known as D. D. Phiri, (February 23, 1931 – March 24, 2019) was a Malawian author, economist, historian, and playwright. He was born in Mzimba, Malawi, and was the Principal and proprietor of the Aggrey Memorial School in Blantyre. He published 17 books in the fields of history, sociology and economics and was recognized by the Pan-African Writers' Association (PAWA) as one of the top 23 authors in Africa in 2011. He was a regular columnist in The Nation newspaper. He died on 24 March 2019 at Mwaiwathu Private Hospital in Blantyre

== Personal life ==
Phiri was born on 23 February 1931 in Mzimba, Malawi. He went to Blantyre Secondary School and Livingstonia and London. He later moved to England and studied Economics, History, and Sociology at the London School of Economics (part of the University of London). He was accorded with an honorary doctorate by the University of Malawi.

== Career ==
He worked as a diplomat in the foreign service and retired from the civil service in 1976. He was the Principal and Proprietor of Aggrey Memorial School. He was a columnist for The Nation newspaper.

== Published works ==
=== Books ===
==== Biography ====
- Let Us Die for Africa: An African Perspective on the Life and Death of John Chilembwe of Nyasaland - 1999
- Charles Chidongo Chinula - 1975
- Dunduzu K. Chisiza - 1974
- James Frederick Sangala: Founder of the Nyasaland African Congress and Bridge between Patriot John Chilembwe and Ngwazi Dr. H. Kamuzu Banda - 1974
- Inkosi Gomani II: Maseko-Ngoni Paramount Chief Who Suffered Martyrdom for His People and Country - 1973

==== History ====
- From Nguni to Ngoni:A History of the Ngoni Exodus from Zululand and Swaziland to Malawi, Tanzania and Zambia - 1982
- History of Malawi: From Earliest Times to the Year 1915 - January 2004
- History of the Tumbuka People - 2000
- Democracy with a Price: The History of Malawi since 1900 (co-authors Bakili Muluzi, Yusuf Juwayeyi, Mercy Makhambera) - 1999

==== Novels (in Tumbuka language) ====
- Mankhwala a Ntchito
- Kanakazi Kayaya
- Ku Msika wa Vyawaka
- Ulanda wa Mavunika

==== Self-help ====
- Hints to Private Students
- What the Achievers Teach about Success

=== Essays ===
- Malawi Our Future Our Choice: The Selected Essays of D. D. Phiri (co-authors John Williams, Judy Williams) - 2006

=== Plays ===
- The Chief's Bride

== See also ==
- Lwanda, John Chipembere; Phiri, Chimwemwe (2019). "Desmond Dudwa Phiri: Writer, historian, economist, educationalist, civil servant: an appreciation". The Society of Malawi Journal. 72 (2): 34–39. ISSN 0037-993X. JSTOR 26870736.
