= Barnaba Zingani =

Malawian novelist and teacher (born 1958)

Barnaba M. Zingani (born 3 March 1958) is a Malawian novelist and teacher. He is the son of the late Rev. Maxwell Zingani, a primary school teacher and Anglican priest, and is the brother of the late author and journalist Willie Zingani.

Zingani has written five books in the Chichewa language, as well as a technical book, Air Conditioning and Refrigeration Mechanics, and a number of short stories in Chichewa, published in Moni magazine. Zingani has also published a children's book in English, Black-Skinned Scientist and Other Stories (2016). He was also a member of the Malawi Writers Group.

The titles of his novels are:

- Ukaziputa Limba (1987)
- Nzeru Za Yekha (1990) (children's book)
- Kugwira Njakata (1991)
- Ufiti (1992) (children's book)
- Mmphawi wa Chuma (2000)

Zingani is married, and has three daughters and a son.
