= Stanley Onjezani Kenani =

Malawian poet (born 1976)

Stanley Onjezani Kenani (born in 1976) is a Malawian writer of poetry and short stories. He has performed at the Arts Alive Festival in Johannesburg, South Africa, Poetry Africa in Durban, South Africa, Harare International Festival of the Arts (HIFA) in Harare, Zimbabwe, and at the Struga Poetry Evenings in North Macedonia. He has read with some famous African and world poets, including Mahmoud Darwish of Palestine, Natalie Handal of Palestine/USA, Carolyn Forche of USA, Dennis Brutus of South Africa, Keorapetse Kgositsile of South Africa, Shimmer Chinodya of Zimbabwe, Chirikure Chirikure of Zimbabwe, Benedicto Wokomaatani Malunga of Malawi and Alfred Msadala of Malawi among others.

Kenani served as president of the Malawi Writers Union from 2004 to 2007, an organization that as of 2014 had 800 members. An accountant who is also a member of the Association of Chartered Certified Accountants (ACCA), a Certified Internal Auditor (CIA) and a Certified Public Accountant in Malawi (CPA-M), he also serves as acting treasurer for the Pan African Writers' Association (PAWA), a continental body of writers with headquarters in Accra, Ghana. Since 2010 he has worked for the United Nations Office of Internal Oversight Services (OIOS).

Kenani's collection of poems Slaughterhouse of Sanity is yet to be published, but several poems in it have been published in A Hudson View and other journals and magazines. His short story collection, For Honour and Other Stories, was published by eKhaya in 2011.

== Awards and recognition ==
Kenani has won multiple short story writing honors. In 2007, his short story "For Honour" won third place in the HSBC/SA PEN Competition, which drew entrants from 12 Southern African countries and was judged by Nobel Laureate J. M. Coetzee. The same short story was shortlisted in 2008 for the Caine Prize (the highest literary award for African writing, sometimes referred to as "The African Booker"). The story is published in the anthology African Pens: New Writing From Southern Africa 2007. In 2012, Kenani was shortlisted a second time for the Caine Prize for his story "Love on Trial".

In April 2014 he was named in the Hay Festival's Africa39 project as one of the 39 Sub-Saharan African writers aged under 40 with the potential and talent to define trends in African literature.
