= Whyghtone Kamthunzi =

Malawian writer (1956–2000)

Whyghtone Kamthunzi (31 July 1956 – 18 May 2000) was a leading writer in the Chichewa language of Malawi in the 1980s and 1990s.

Kamthunzi was born in the village of Njolomole in Ntcheu district in Malawi. His father was a school teacher. After attending Ntcheu Secondary School from 1972 to 1976 he trained as a teacher at Lilongwe Teachers’ College. He began his teaching career in 1978 at Nkhata Bay and later moved to Malili Primary School in Likuni near Lilongwe.

Kamthunzi began writing plays and stories in 1976. He was also the leader of a drama group in Lilongwe. Kamthunzi became well known for his radio series Tinkanena ('We Told You So'), (Note: From the proverb Mtsinje wa Tinkanena udathira m'Siizi 'The river of "We kept saying" has ended in "Isn't it this?"'. J.C. Chakanza Wisdom of the People: 2000 Chinyanja Proverbs (CLAIM Malawi 2001), p.216.) a series of plays on the theme of Aids about a young man called Same.

Among the short novels written by Kamthunzi were the following:

- Wachitatu Nkapasule ('The Third Person is a Family-Breaker') (Malawian Writers Series, Popular Publications 1987)

A girl from a wealthy family falls in love with a poor boy and marries him. But the boy’s uncle is dead against the marriage and does his best to break it up. In the end, however, the good sense and diplomacy of the girl’s parents win the day.

- Sungani: Mwana Wolimba Mtima ('Sungani, the Courageous Boy') (Popular Publications 1988)

A young boy, Sungani, brought up in a village, learns to be sympathetic to animals. He is distressed when the local chief starts a hunt to kill baboons who are stealing the village crops and tries unsuccessfully to persuade the chief to stop the hunt. In the end, however, an environmental disaster follows and Sungani is praised for his foresight.

- Agnesi ndi Mphunzitsi Wake ('Agnes and her Teacher') (Popular Publications 1990)

Sautso, the young unmarried headmaster of a secondary school, forms a relationship with one of his students, a distant cousin, despite opposition from the local chief, from his own parents, and from Khumbo, an unqualified teacher whom he has been forced to dismiss. When the girl is raped and dies from a home abortion he is falsely accused of murder, but is saved at the last minute when the rapist confesses.

- Nyanga ya Nsatsi ('A Horn made from a Castor Oil Plant') (Popular Publications 1990) (Note: The title comes from the proverb Mwana akalirira nyanga ya nsatsi, msemere imfotere yekha kumanja 'If your child cries out for a horn made of castor-oil wood, carve him one, let it wither in his own hand', i.e. 'Experience is the best teacher'. Chakanza, p.226.)
- Gadula Wosamva ('Gadula, Who Wouldn't Listen') (Dzuka Pub. Co. 1991)
- Njokaluzi ('The Harmless Snake') (Popular Publications 1993)

A plucky boy called Chifundo is excited to be selected for a secondary boarding school. But when he gets there, like other first year boys he is terrorised by one of the senior boys called Pasula. One day, however, he gets into a fight with Pasula and vanquishes him, to the delight of everyone.

- Tiferenji ('Why should we die?') (Popular Publications 1996)
- Kuno n'Kunja ('This is the World') (Popular Publications 1996) (Note: The title refers to the proverb Kuno n'kunja, kuyanja lichero, pamene khasu ligonekedwa panja 'This is the world, it favours the winnowing basket while the hoe is laid aside', i.e. 'When you prosper, don't look down on your friends, since you never know what the future holds for you'. Chakanza, p.138; S. Paas, Dictionary Chichewa-English, English-Chichewa, 5th ed., 2015, s.v. lichero.)
- Wakufa Sadziwika ('The One who Dies Isn’t Known') (CLAIM Malawi 2005) (Note: This proverb refers to a story about a guinea-fowl that tried to eat a landfrog but died in the process. Chakanza, p.332.)

A young newly appointed doctor, Chikondi, befriends a madman and tries to cure him. But the local chief and the hospital director are afraid that the madman will reveal their secrets and they plot to have Chikondi murdered. By good fortune the plot goes wrong and the criminals are punished.
