= Frank Chipasula =

Malawian writer and academic (born 1949)

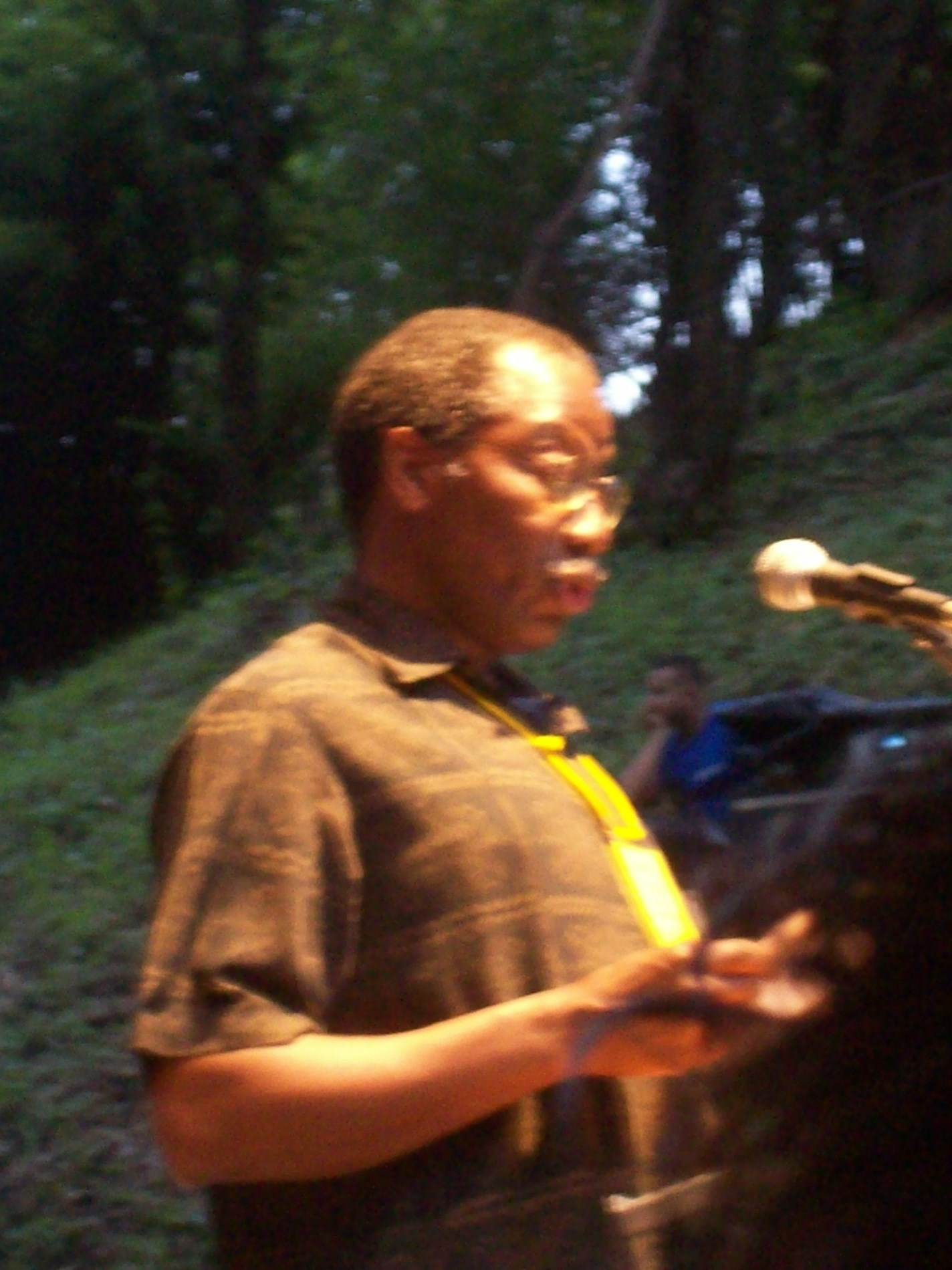
- Chipasula in 2008
- Born: Frank Mkalawile Chipasula; 16 October 1949 (age 76); Luanshya, Northern Rhodesia
- Education: University of Zambia; Brown University; Yale University
- Occupations: Writer, editor and university professor

Frank Mkalawile Chipasula (born 16 October 1949) is a Malawian writer, editor and university professor, "easily one of the best of the known writers in the discourse of Malawian letters".

== Life ==
=== Career ===
Born in Luanshya, Northern Rhodesia, Frank Chipasula attended St. Peter's Primary School on Likoma Island, Soche Hill Day Secondary School, Malosa Secondary School, Chancellor College, University of Malawi, and, finally, the Great East Road Campus of the University of Zambia, Lusaka, where he graduated with a B.A. degree, in exile, in 1976. While at the University of Malawi, he helped establish the Malawi Writers Group. Before leaving Malawi, Chipasula had worked as a freelance broadcaster for the Malawi Broadcasting Corporation while studying English and French at the university. In Lusaka, he served as English Editor for the National Educational Company of Zambia (NECZAM), his first publisher, following his graduation from the University of Zambia.

In 1978, Chipasula went into exile in the United States as a result of the Hastings Banda government, studying for his M.A. in Creative Writing at Brown University, a second M.A. in African American Studies at Yale University and gaining a Ph.D. in English literature from Brown University in 1987. Previously a professor of Black Studies at the University of Nebraska at Omaha and Howard University, Chipasula has also worked as the education attaché at the Malawian embassy in Washington, D.C.. His first book, Visions and Reflections (1972), is also the first published poetry volume in English by a Malawian writer. As well as poetry, which has been widely anthologised, he has written radio plays and fiction.

In 2018, Chipasula organized the Women's Poetry Festival in Malawi.

=== Personal life ===
Since 10 January 1976, Chipasula has been married to Stella, a former school teacher, whom he met in Mulanje, Malawi, in 1972. With her, he co-edited The Heinemann Book of African Women's Poetry, which was published in 1995. They have two grown children, James Masauko Mgeni Akuzike and Helen Chipo.

== Distinctions ==
- Honourable mention Noma Award, 1985
- BBC Poetry Prize, 1989

== Works ==
Chipasula's works include:

- Chipasula, Frank Mkalawili (1972). Visions and Reflections. [Lusaka, Zambia]: NECZAM. OCLC 2003124. 51 pages. Poetry.
- Chipasula, Frank Mkalawili (1984). O Earth, Wait for Me. Staffrider series, no. 22. Johannesburg: Ravan Press, Exclusive Books [distributor]. ISBN 9780869752586. OCLC 12107252. 84 pages. Poetry.
- Chipasula, Frank Mkalawile (1985). When my brothers come home : poems from central and southern Africa. Middletown, Connecticut, USA / Scranton, Pennsylvania, USA: Wesleyan University Press. Distributed by Harper & Row. ISBN 9780819550927. OCLC 10072530. 278 pages. Poetry anthology.
- Chipasula, Frank Mkalawili (1986). Nightwatcher, Nightsong. Dangerous writers. Peterborough: Spectacular Diseases. ISBN 9780946904044. OCLC 767793998. 25 pages. Poetry.
- Chipasula, Frank Mkalawili (1991). Whispers in the Wings: Poems. African Writers Series / Heinemann African poets. London: Heinemann. ISBN 9780435911928. OCLC 25388161. 111 pages. Poetry.
- Chipasula, Frank Mkalawili (1991). A Decade in Poetry. Voices in poetry. Lusaka: Kenneth Kaunda Foundation. ISBN 9789982011457. OCLC 31411862. 147 pages. Zambian poetry anthology.
- Chipasula, Stella; Chipasula, Frank Mkalawile, eds. (1995). The Heinemann book of African women's poetry. Oxford, Oxfordshire, UK: Heinemann. ISBN 9780435906801. OCLC 35587241. 227 pages. Anthology.
- Chipasula, Frank Mkalawili (2007). On the Shoulders of the Mountain: A Selection of Poems. Makanda, Illinois: EarthCDs. OCLC 156979002. pages. Audio disc. Poetry anthology.
- Chipasula, Frank Mkalawili, ed. (2009). Bending the Bow: An Anthology of African Love Poetry. Carbondale, Illinois, USA: Southern Illinois University Press. ISBN 9780809328420. OCLC 283802751. 285 pages. Poetry anthology.
