= Ezra Chadza =

Malawian teacher, author and poet (1923–1985)

Ezra Jofiya Chadza (1923–1985) or E.J. Chadza, as he signed his books, was a well-known Malawian teacher, author and poet, writing especially in the Chichewa language of Malawi.

Ezra Chadza was born in the village of Ntande in Dedza District in Malawi in 1923. He attended school in the same village, and then in 1937 went on to the Mlanda mission school (situated at Lizulu between Dedza and Ntcheu). In 1939, he began to teach. He studied for a teaching certificate at Nkhoma from 1943 to 1945, obtaining the Grade 2, or the "English grade" as it was known at that time. Afterwards he taught at Mlanda, before becoming headmaster of Livukezi School in Ntcheu in 1948.

From 1949 to 1954, he taught in Southern Rhodesia (now Zimbabwe). He studied teaching again at Domasi Teacher Training College until 1959. After that, he taught at the Kongwe Presbyterian mission school in Dowa District. It was here that he wrote Ntchito za Pakamwa and Zokoma ziri m'Tsogolo. In 1968, he continued his studies at the University of Cape Town. In 1970 with others he started a school to teach Chichewa to missionaries in Kongwe. He also ran the Nkhoma Synod school and in 1972 became secretary of the Chichewa Board, a board set up by President Hastings Kamuzu Banda to encourage and develop the Chichewa language. Chadza died in 1985.

In the preface to his best-known book, Kokha Mcheperawakalulu, Chadza explains that he originally submitted the book, together with four others, to the Publications and Literature Bureau for approval in 1966. Unfortunately the manuscript of all the books was lost when the Bureau was closed. He therefore had to write the book again. The only book that survived was Tiphunzire Chichewa, which he happened to have with him for revision. In the same introduction, Chadza complains about the fact that very few books have been written in Chichewa, and expresses his belief that Malawians should write books in their own language, just as other nations do.

Chadza's best known poem is Likongolerenji Bokosi? ("What a Beauty the Coffin Is"), which was chosen for comment in the 2011 International Baccalaureate Chichewa exam.

== Works ==
- Ntchito za Pakamwa: Ndakatulo za m'Chinyanja ("Works of the Mouth: Chinyanja Poems")

(Lusaka: Northern Rhodesia Publications Bureau, 1963)

- Zokoma ziri m'Tsogolo ("Pleasant Things are in the Future") (1963) (Note: The title is taken from a proverb. Cf. J. C. Chakanza (2001), Wisdom of the People: 2000 Chinyanja Proverbs, p. 357.)
- Tiphunzire Chichewa ("Let's Learn Chichewa") (1966)

This book, which is currently unavailable, explained the rules of Chichewa using the Chichewa language itself.

- Kokha Mcheperawakalulu (Popular Publications 1980) (Note: The name is taken from a proverb: Mchepera wa kalulu, mtima unga phiri ("Although the hare is small, its heart is like a mountain"). Chakanza, p. 190.)

This is the story of a small but courageous boy, nicknamed Kokha Mcheperawakalulu, who has various adventures including rescuing the son of a chief from a crocodile. In the last few chapters, by joining a bandit group which has been terrorising the neighbourhood, Kokha manages to deliver the bandits to the police. The book is written mostly in prose, but with poems interspersed here and there.
