= Innocent Masina Nkhonyo =

Malawian writer and poet

Innocent Masina Nkhonyo (born 3 March 1987) is a Malawian writer and poet, writing mostly in the Chichewa language. He was born in Dedza, and educated at Likuni Primary School and Mlale Seminary in Lilongwe. From 2008 to 2012 he studied Education Humanities at the University of Malawi in Zomba. He has had numerous short stories in Chichewa published in the newspapers Weekend Nation and Malawi News. He has also written poems, including Mubwere ku Mudzi ('Please Come Home') and Mseko ('Laughter').
