= Legson Kayira =

Malawian writer (unknown–2012)

Legson Kayira (unknown - 14 October 2012), known as Legson Kayira, was a Malawian novelist. He is best known as the author of the 1965 autobiography, I Will Try, which became an international bestseller.

== Life ==
An ethnic Tumbuka, Legson Kayira was born in the Karonga district of Nyasaland (now Malawi) in the late 1930s or early 1940s. Kayira records in his autobiography that his mother threw him into the Didumu River as an infant, but was rescued by a neighbour. He went on to receive a mission education, first at Wenya and then at the Livingstonia mission. While at school he dropped his names Didimu and Chalangani, adopting an English sounding name in their place.

In October 1958, Kayira left Livingstonia in search of further educational opportunities. He went on to undertake on a 2,500 mile walk through Tanganyika and the Protectorate of Uganda before arriving in Khartoum in September 1960. Kayira carried with him a Bible and a copy of The Pilgrim's Progress. He also wore his Livingstonia school shirt, which bore the motto 'I will try'. With the assistance of the American Vice-Consul and with funds raised in America, he was able to secure a place at Skagit Valley College in Mount Vernon, Washington, which he had found in a directory of US colleges.

Kayira went on to the University of Washington, gaining a BA in Political Science in 1965, before receiving a scholarship to attend St. Catharine's College, Cambridge to read History. Kayira was exiled in 1967 by President Hastings Banda and he remained in England where he had a long career in Government service in London. During these years he met and married his first wife, with whom he had four children, before remarrying in later life

Legson Kayira died in London on 14 October 2012 after suffering a brain hemorrhage. He was survived by four children and seven grandchildren.

== Work ==
Legson Kayira's literary work comprises an autobiography and four novels, all of which appeared in the decade from the mid 1960s to the mid 1970s. Towards the end of his life he was working on another novel, although this has never been published.

He is best known for his autobiography, I Will Try, which recounts his 2,500 mile walk to Sudan. First published as a US edition by Doubleday in 1965, a UK edition was released by Longmans in 1966, which was then followed by several translations. The book remained on the New York Times bestseller list for 16 weeks after its publication. Academic reviews point to the historical value of the work in understanding decolonisation in Africa, the interest the narrative maintains, but also frustration at perfunctory remarks, regarding both The Pilgrim's Progress and the author's admiration for President Banda, inserted almost at random.

Kayira's four proceeding novels - The Looming Shadow (1968), Jingala (1969), The Civil Servant (1971), and The Detainee (1974) - reveal a gradual shift from pastoral, non-political, themes towards a darker and more satirical vision that grows alongside a disillusionment with the Banda regime.

In The Looming Shadow, Kayira focusses on village rivalries. Musyani, the main protagonist, is accused of witchcraft by Matenda, who is suffering an unexplained illness. Musyani is unable to prove his innocence and turns to the Eurpean district commissioner to save him. The novel ends with the conviction of three men who burned Musyani's house to the ground. While not the 'first authentically African novel by a native African' as stated on the dust jacket released by Doubleday, the novel does explore the common theme of African societies being caught between modernity and tradition.

Jingala was reviewed less favourably in academic journals, and follows a similar theme to The Looming Shadow. Here the novel focusses on just two main characters, an eponymous retired tax collector and his son, Gregory, who aspires to become a priest. In the novel Jingala fetches his son from the city, where he has been attending school, and learns of his wishes. They return to their village from where Gregory is forbidden to continue his education.

The narrative of The Civil Servant represents a gradual shift from Kayira's two earlier novels, with a gentle focus on labour exports to South Africa. The protagonist, George Chipewa, works as a civil servant in an independent Malawi and is married to a South African woman. He embarks on an affair with Isabella, whose husband works away in the mines. At the same time, Chipewa's assistant begins a relationship with Chipewa's own wife and then a European woman. Isabella soon becomes pregnant and then learns of her husband's death following a mining accident, which her parent's blame on her infidelity. After giving birth, Isabella herself dies. The novel ends with Chipewa reconciling with his wife and the couple adopt Isabella's son.

By the early 1970s Kayira was seen by many young Malawians as detached from the harsh realities of the Banda regime. It was only with his fourth and final novel, The Detainee, that he began to address the political realities emerging in Malawi. Kayira offered this to the Heinemann African Writers Series where it appeared as number 162 in the series. The ageing protagonist, Napolo, is a farmer from a rural community who is making his way to town for medical treatment. He is first harassed by members of the Young Brigades, supporters of the nation's despot, Sir Zaddock Mlingo, before being interrogated at a roadblock and taken to a detention centre. After weeks at the centre he is beaten and left for dead. The novel closes with Napolo alone and severely injured. The novel has been described as Kafkaesque, relying on the surreal as an effective mechanism to highlight unrestrained abuses of power.

== Published works ==
- Kayira, Legson (1965). I Will Try. New York: Doubleday.
- — (1967). The Looming Shadow. New York: Doubleday.
- — (1969). Jingala. London: Longman.
- — (1971). The Civil Servant. London: Longman.
- — (1974). The Detainee. African Writers Series. Heinemann.

== Sources ==
- Benson, Eugene; Conolly, L.W. (2005). Encyclopedia of Post-Colonial Literatures in English. Abingdon: Routledge.
- Burns, James (Summer 1972). "Review: The Civil Servant by Legson Kayira". Books Abroad (Review). 46 (3). Board of Regents of the University of Oklahoma: 532.
- "Celebrated Malawi writer Legson Kayira dies at 70". Nyasa Times. Lilongwe. 15 October 2012a.
- Currey, James (2008). Africa Writes Back: The African Writers Series and the Launch of African Literature. Oxford: James Currey.
- Dameron, Charles F. (Spring 1976). "Review: The Detainee by Legson Kayira". Books Abroad (Review). 50 (2). Board of Regents of the University of Oklahoma: 456–457.
- "Destination: Skagit Valley". Time. New York. 19 December 1960. p. 60. Archived from the original on 21 July 2013.
- Gagiano, Annie (2018). "Incarceration and Torture in Eastern African Fiction: Issues in Representation". Matatu. 50 (1): 128–151. doi:10.1163/18757421-05001003.
- Herdeck, Donald E. (1973). African Authors: A Companion to Black African Writing. Volume 1: 1300-1973. Washington D.C.: Black Orpheus Press.
- Jahn, Janheinz (1972). Who's Who in African Literature. Tübingen: Horst Erdmann Verlag.
- Kayira, Legson (January 2011). "In His Own Words" (PDF). Currents. Mount Vernon, Washington: Skagit Valley College. pp. 4–5.
- Kumwenda, J. I. (2018). "The Role of the Surreal in Postcolonial African Writing: The Case of Legson Kayira's Jingala and The Detainee". Matatu. 50 (1): 152–168. doi:10.1163/18757421-05001009.
- Larson, Charles R. (August–September 1968). "The Search for the Past: East and Central African Writing". Africa Today. 15 (4). Indiana University Press: 12–15.
- Larson, Charles R. (August–September 1970). "Review: Jingala by Legson Kayira". Books Abroad. 44 (2). Board of Regents of the University of Oklahoma: 360.
- "Malawi author, academic Legson Kayira buried in London". Nyasa Times. Lilongwe. 31 October 2012b.
- Roscoe, Adrian (2008). The Columbia Guide to Central African Literature in English Since 1945. New York: Columbia University Press.
- Symonds, Richard (1967). "Review: I Will Try by Legson Kayira". African Affairs (Review). 66 (262). Oxford University Press: 79–80.
- Wauthier, Claude (1967). "Review: No Easy Task by Aubrey Kachingwe; I Will Try by Legson Kayira". Présence Africaine (Review) (61): 241–243.
