= Jack Mapanje =

Malawian writer and poet (1944–2026)

- Born: John Alfred Clement Mapanje; 25 March 1944; Kadango village, Mangochi District, Nyasaland Protectorate
- Died: 4 November 2026 (aged 82); York, England
- Occupations: Writer; poet; academic
- Known for: Poetry, 1987–1991 imprisonment
- Notable work: Of Chameleons and Gods (1981)
- Awards: Rotterdam Poetry International Award (1988); PEN/Barbara Goldsmith Freedom to Write Award (1990)

Jack Mapanje (25 March 1944 – 4 November 2026) was a Malawian writer and poet. He was the head of English at the Chancellor College, the main campus of the University of Malawi before being imprisoned in 1987 for his collection Of Chameleons and Gods (1981), which indirectly criticized the administration of President Hastings Banda. Mapanje was released in 1991 and emigrated to the UK, where he worked as a teacher.

== Background ==
The child of Nyanja and Yao parents, John Alfred Clement ("Jack") Mapanje was born in Kadango Village, Mangochi District, Malawi on 25 March 1944. He received his BA in education from the University of London and worked for a time as a lecturer in Malawi before returning to the UK to study linguistics at University College, London, in the early 1980s. He was an active member of the Malawi Writers Group.

He subsequently became head of the Department of Language and Linguistics at the University of Malawi.

== Imprisonment ==
During the rule of President Hastings Banda, Mapanje was jailed without charge in 1987, apparently for publishing his poem collection Of Chameleons and Gods. The collection obliquely criticized Banda's government, and the "chameleon" of the title refers to the disguise of personal voice Mapanje deemed necessary in order to mount a criticism of the politics at the time. The book received no official ban, but was "withdrawn from circulation". Amnesty International declared him a prisoner of conscience and campaigned for his release. Its protests included a reading of selections from Of Chameleons and Gods outside the Malawian High Commission in London by UK Nobel laureate Harold Pinter. Mapanje was also awarded the 1990 PEN/Barbara Goldsmith Freedom to Write Award during his imprisonment, which carried a US$3,000 cash award. PEN's president, US novelist Larry McMurtry, stated that "the point [of the award] is to generate enough heat so Mapanje gets out of jail". Nigerian Nobel laureate Wole Soyinka and UK playwright Ronald Harwood also campaigned for his release.

Mapanje was held for three-and-a-half years before being released in 1991. After his release, he was told he needed to reapply for his previous professorship at the University of Malawi. After a lengthy delay in his application, he instead emigrated to the UK. He wrote a memoir about the experience, And Crocodiles Are Hungry At Night, which was also adapted into a play.

== Exile ==
After arriving in the UK, Mapanje was awarded a fellowship at The University of York. He later became a visiting professor at Leeds University. He also taught creative writing in prisons.

In 1994, he returned to Malawi with BBC2 to make a documentary.

== Chameleon politics ==
Mapanje is credited for applying the term "chameleon politics" to describe a political environment where politicians switch parties and forge alliances without transparency or notice in rapidly changing political environments where party switching, floor crossing, and coalition formations are rampant. The notion is described in his 1981 book, Of Chameleons and Gods.

== Death ==
Mapanje died in England on 4 November 2026, at the age of 82.

== Works ==
- Of Chameleons and Gods, 1981
- On the Interpretation of Aspect and Tense in Chiyao, Chicheŵa, and English. University College London Ph.D. thesis, 1983
- The Chattering Wagtails of Mikuyu Prison, 1993
- (Editor) Gathering Seaweed: African Prison Writing, Pearson Education, 2002 ISBN 978-0-435-91211-6
- The Last of the Sweet Bananas: New and Selected Poems, 2004
- The Beasts of Nalunga, 2007
- And Crocodiles are Hungry at Night – a memoir. Ayebia Clarke Publishing, 2011

== Awards ==
- 1988: Rotterdam Poetry International Award
- 1990: PEN/Barbara Goldsmith Freedom to Write Award
- 2002: African Literature Association (USA) Fonlon-Nichols Award
