= Janta (Malawian musician) =

Malawian musician (born 1989)

- Born: Shukuran Mwachumu; 22 October 1989 (age 36); Mangochi, Malawi
- Genres: Afro-soul; Afrobeat
- Occupations: Musician songwriter producer
- Years active: 2003–present

Shukuran Mwachumu (born 22 October 1989) better known by his stage name Janta, is a Malawian Afro Pop artist. In 2015, his song titled Wangongole (Debt collector) won a Nyasa Music Award in Best Song of the Year category. In 2019, his music video won Best video of the year in UMP Awards.

== Background ==
=== Early life ===
Mwachumu on 22 October 1989 in the southern District of Mangochi in Malawi. He started his music career when he was 9 years old when he taught himself to play a piano and guitar. His associated genres include Afro Pop, Hip-Hop and RNB. Mwachumu's major breakthrough came in 2015 after releasing "Divorce" (Banja Ndalilephela) Music video which topped charts in Malawi and its music video was premiered on Trace Africa and other major platform across the East Africa making him the most Trending artist in Malawi then.

In 2015, he won a UMP Awards in video of the year for his song "divorce" which also saw achievement within the SADC region. In 2017, he was a winner for song of the year titled "wangongole" in Nyasa Music Awards. In 2018, he was a nominee among the best producer of the year UMP Awards.

In 2019, he and fellow Malawian singer, Tigris, recorded a duet where the song was about the need to save the lives of tigers. The recording was created in partnership with the Lilongwe Wildlife trust and Conservation Music Malawi. The number of tigers has fallen significantly and their song highlighted the issue. Their song was released on World Lion Day which is 10 August.

He has also produced songs for so various Malawian urban artists such as Gwamba, Onesimus, Lucius Banda, Lulu, Suffix, SamSmak, Martse, Nepman, Sangie, Dan Lu, Kelly kay, and Tay Grin, among others.

== Achievements ==
=== UMP Awards ===
Year	Nominee / work	Award	Result
2018	Himself	Producer of the Year	Nominated
2015	Divorce	Best Video Artist of the Year	Won

=== Nyasa Music Awards ===
Year	Nominee / work	Award	Result
2017	Wangongole (Debt collector)	Song of the Year	Won
