= Malawian hip-hop =

Music genre

Hip-hop culture in Malawi emerged in the 1990s.

== Early history ==
By the late 1990s, the scene began to gain traction with a few rap songs being released to the public. The early 2000s is when more artists started to embrace the music and participated in hip-hop culture. At this time, personal computers started to become more popular and recording hardware such as microphones and digital audio interfaces became more affordable and available. Pirated versions of Digital Audio Workstations (DAWs) such as FL Studio, Ableton Live, REAPER, and Cakewalk enabled individuals to produce and record their own music in home studios.

The launch of Television Malawi in 1999 also provided a platform for rappers to have their music videos beamed to a national audience. The music video to Wisdom Chitedze's song Tipewe was on regular rotation on the station in its early days and is often cited as the first Malawian rap music video. The song, which featured Stix (who later adopted the use of his government name, David Kailani) of the Real Elements, spoke of the need to practice safe sexual habits to avoid the spread of HIV/AIDS which was taking the lives of many people in the country. The song, in many ways laid the foundation of early hip-hop in the country as it was well-received by the youth, older generation and various NGOs which used it to spread awareness of the dangers of the pandemic.

The building blocks of the culture continued being laid in the early to mid-2000s with artists such as Nospa G, M Krazy, David Kalilani, and Gosple. Much like other forms of Malawian music, a lot of the early hip-hop released contained social commentary, religious, and introspective themes. But as the years passed, a wider variety of subject matter was adopted. The rap group Biriwiri Released a highly popular single titled "Daily Daily", which helped ingratiate hip-hop to a wider audience due to its playful and relatable lyrics about being in a relationship with someone you want to see on a daily basis.

Other notable rappers who were early on the scene include Criminal A, Bantu Clan, Real Elements, Dynamike, Dominant 1, and Knights of the Round Table which was a crew of various emcees, including Bass-sik, Hot Nick, and Cris Mack among others.

By the late 2000s the scene had picked up further with artists such as Barry One, Basement, Mandela Mwanza aka Third Eye, Hyphen, Fredokiss, and Tay Grin gaining notoriety.

Third Eye became a notable figure due to his intricate lyricism, clear vocal delivery, and deep, distinct voice. His album Imagine Being Jesus and Not Knowing It was a pivotal release due to its quality, coherence and production. Singles released from the album had accompanying music videos primarily filmed by KRC Productions, which was also responsible for filming and editing a large number of hip-hop music videos at the time. These videos enjoyed a significant amount of airplay on Television Malawi which helped to further spread hip-hop.

Around the same time, Tay Grin's music video for the song Stand Up was featured considerably on Channel O. He was not the first Malawian rapper to get his song on that station; that accolade goes to the Real Elements. However, Tay Grin's song got much more airplay. In 2009, Phyzix released his debut studio album The Lone Ranger LP which contained the hit singles Cholapitsa and Gamba which brought him a lot of attention. At the same time The Dare Devilz who were based in Blantyre, Malawi started getting a lot of airplay and became instrumental in producing music for the likes of Fredokiss and a variety of Blantyre-based rappers. Young Kay released a single titled Anankabango which became a crossover hit that appealed to multiple demographics.

Universities such as the Malawi Polytechnic and the Chancellor College became hubs for young people who were interested in rap. Many rappers honed their skills during variety shows, public fun fairs, and college social weekends.

As Internet access and YouTube grew in the 2010s, various universities recorded and released cyphers to showcase some of their hip-hop talent. This was also a time of evolution as the more traditional boom-bap sound started to lose popularity in favour of a more trap and bass heavy sound along with the rise of passada and afropop beats which became infused in the Malawi hip-hop sound. This gave rise to artists such as Martse, Gwamba who became known for a more pop sound.

== Christian rap ==
As secular hip-hop was developing, Christian rap was also evolving in parallel and started to gain popularity among the young. That movement was spearheaded by Darray, Manyanda Nyasulu, DJ Kali, KBG, Double Zee, Liwu, Mwayi Wawo, C-Scripture, Asodzi, Erasto, Crosova, Suffix, and Sintha. David Kalilani released the Spirit Filled Spit Kickers mixtapes which showcased a number of some of the pioneering Christian hip-hop artists in Malawi. Aubrey Mvula, more commonly known as Gosple, was another major contributor to the Malawi Christian hip-hop scene. He brought a lot of attention to the genre by collaborating with British artists such as Jahaziel and True2DaName.

== Style and influences ==
A large part of Malawian hip-hop is in local Malawian languages, especially Chichewa which is spoken across the entire country and Chitumbuka which is spoken primarily across the northern region. A sizable section of artists use English entirely while others mix the two languages. Over the years there have generally been very few rappers of note that use other languages such as Lambya, Yao and Sena. The most notable rapper who uses the Yao language is NXJewish who's regarded as a pioneer in that sector.

Malawian hip-hop has historically been heavily influenced by global music trends. In its early days in the 90s, much of the music adopted the boom-bap style of production and delivery which was globally popular at the time. As the 2000s came around, the music started to take a turn into dirty south hip-hop which was starting to take centre stage thanks to the growing popularity of American artists such as T.I.

As trap took over the airwaves in the 2010s, Malawian hip-hop also took a turn to favour that style of music. However, in the later half of the 2010s and early 2020s the music started to include a more afropop and passada style of production which is more geared towards making people dance. Popular artists who favour this style of production include Phyzix, Gwamba, Martse, Darray, and Piksy. Music in this style often covers topics such as relationships, having a good time, and occasionally life struggles.

No industry is homogeneous and another sector of the hip-hop industry continues to favour boom-bap and a more old school style of production and delivery. Some of these artists includes L Planet, Third Eye, Dominant 1, Black Mind, Mahiri, Eminent-1, Naleji, King's Rifles, Sage Poet, Darray, Genetix, and C-Scripture. This group represents a more traditional style of hip-hop and generally featured rappers in their 30s and older. Lyrical content in this style often covers personal and life struggles, socio-political commentary, as well as commentary on hip-hop culture. It's more geared towards an audience that prefers conscious rap.

Some Malawian songs feature a mix of western and local sounds. The most notable of these are the Bantu Kamradz, and Tay Grin who feature a lot of traditional instruments and talk about Malawian culture including Nyau, village life, and the life of the typical struggling Malawian.

== Producers and radio DJs ==
Some of the producers who helped pioneer the sound of Malawian hip-hop include Dominant 1, Dynamike, Maj Beats, The Dare Devilz, Kond1, Justus Divine, Qabaniso Malewezi, Tapps Bandawe, Dizzo, Denreal Rezart, Sonye, Kas Mdoka, Pro Pee, Tricky Beatz, Blage, and Rebel Musiq.

DJs Dr Gwynz and Kenny Klips helped push the music on the radio. They hosted a show called The Hip-Hop Drill which involved playing rap music and a phone-in rap competition whereby rappers called in and competed to spit the best bars. At the time, their show was one of the only ones that were purely dedicated to playing and promoting rap music and hip-hop culture.

Over time, the number of radio stations and consumption of urban music increased which helped the adoption of Malawian hip-hop.

== Commercial viability ==
Similar to many African countries, the monetization of music in Malawi is still problematic and limited. There are relatively few musicians who live solely on music and hip-hop artists in Malawi are not an expection to this rule. The main means of income is via paid shows and festivals such as the annual Lake of Stars Festival and Sand Music Festival which brings together a number of artists for a weekend of live performances along the beaches of Lake Malawi. Other rappers such as Fredokiss and Phyzix were among the first to secure sponsorship deals from various organizations and stakeholders in exchange for the artists using their music and platforms to promote products, services, and messages.
