= Jay Jay Cee =

Malawian artist

Jay Jay Cee Mw
- Born: July 1, 1997 (age 28)
- Origin: Blantyre, Malawi
- Genres: Fusion Afrobeats
- Occupation: Afro Dancehall Singer Businessman
- Instrument: Vocals
- Years active: 2013–present

Juma James Chitsonga, better known by his stage name Jay Jay Cee Mw (born 1 July 1997), is a Malawian afro dancehall artist. In 2016, he won a UMP awards in the category Best New Artist of the Year and was nominated in the same awards in the category Best Dancehall Artist.

== Background ==
=== Early life and career ===
James Juma Chitsonga was born on 1 July 1997 in Karonga Northern part of Malawi. He developed a passion for music from a young age. Influenced by artists such as Annie Matumbi, Vic Marley, and Movado, he began writing his own songs at age 8. Despite facing challenges in the studio due to his age, he released his debut single "Sister Jessi" at 12, gaining a local fan base. During his secondary school years, Chitsonga slowed down his music pace but continued to entertain his peers. After completing his MSCE in 2013, he rejoined the music scene, joining Mabilinganya Empire through Mady P. His first appearance was on the song "Phone Number," impressing listeners with his verse.

In 2014, Jay Jay Cee released his mixtape "Kupangadzina," featuring artists such as Scola Fella and Young D. The mixtape's success led to chart-topping singles including "Iwe Maliro" and "Ndzakapangira." In 2016, he released his album titled "Dzinalanga," which was set to be released on July 16, featuring collaborations with Nesnes, Saint, and Blaze.

He has worked with various artists such as Nesnes, Blaze, Sir Patricks and Hilco.

== Achievements ==
=== UMP Awards ===
Year	Nominee / work	Award	Result
2021	Himself	Best Collaboration	Nominated
2018	Himself	Best Dancehall Artist/Group	Nominated
2016	Himself	Best Newcomer	Won
2016	Himself	Best Dancehall artist	Nominated

== See also ==
- Sangie
- Fredokiss
- Jetu
