= DJ Sley =

- Born: Sichile Sapa; July 28, 1988 (age 38)
- Origin: Lilongwe, Malawi
- Genres: Hip hop, R&B, Dancehall
- Occupations: Record producer, DJ
- Years active: 2004–present
- Label: Chit Chat Records

Sichile Sapa, professionally known as DJ Sley (born 28 July 1988) is a Malawian record producer and DJ. Since 2004, he has produced hip hop, R&B, and dancehall recordings and earned recognition among Malawi’s top music producers.

== Early life and education ==
Sapa was born in Lilongwe but originally from Kalembo in Machinga District. He received his secondary education at William Murray Secondary School, then got an Advanced Diploma in Information Technology at the National College of Information Technology in 2007.

He began his musical journey in the early 1990s under the help of his brother Richard, learning piano and composing simple melodies. His other brother, Jeffrey, introduced him to music production software in 2002, sparking his interest in beat-making.

== Career ==
DJ Sley officially launched his music career in 2004 with the founding of Chit Chat Records. During his early years, he created instrumentals for local artists such aa Wilson Naming’oma, Panji Kapanga, Gracium Nyambo, Grant Solo, and Davie Nsaku at a Nkhoma studio.

Over the next decade, he produced numerous hits—most notably Malinga’s “Levels” remix featuring Fredokiss, Macelba’s “Alamu Anu,” and Malinga Mafia’s “All I Need Is You.”

His collaborative mixtapes and singles include:

- Sley’s Chit Chat (single, 2013)
- How We Dweet (single, 2015), featuring Third Eye, Episodz, Macelba, Gwamba and others
- Chit Chat Team – Life (single, 2015)
- Chit Chat Compilation (mixtape, 2017) including “We Run the City”

He has produced for a range of Malawian artists, including Tay Grin, Piksy, Gwamba, Martse, Sangie, Young Kay, Third Eye, and Macelba; and internationally for Nigerian singer 2Baba.

== Awards and recognition ==
DJ Sley was named Producer of the Year at the 2019 Urban Music People (UMP) Awards in Blantyre.

Additionally, he was listed as a nominee in the same category earlier in December 2019.

== Discography ==
=== Singles & mixtapes ===
- Sley’s Chit Chat (2013) – single
- How We Dweet (2015) – single
- Chit Chat Team – Life (2015) – single
- Chit Chat Compilation (2017) – mixtape

== See also ==
- Music of Malawi
- UMP Awards
