= Tricky Beatz =

Malawian music producer and sound engineer

- Born: Patrick Manyozo; Malawi
- Occupations: Record producer, mix engineer, sound engineer
- Years active: mid-2010s–present
- Known for: Fusion of Afro-pop, hip hop and Malawian traditional rhythms

Tricky Beatz (born Patrick Manyozo) is a Malawian music producer, mix engineer, and sound engineer. In 2016, he won a title producer of the year in UMP Awards. He is known for fusing contemporary Afro-pop and hip hop with traditional Malawian ng’oma drum patterns. He has worked with several notable artists such as Phyzix, Kell Kay, Gwamba, Macelba, Hilco, and Mwanache.

== Biography ==
Manyozo started producing music after completing secondary school, inspired by his brother Pro-P, who was already active in beat production. His early works were self-taught and experimental, but he later established himself as one of the best producers in the Malawian urban music scene.

== Musical style and work ==
Manyozo is noted for his sound that fuses electronic production with Malawian traditional rhythms.

His productions include Trouble by Hilco, co-produced with Gaffar; Pillow by Saint, produced with Sispence; Tchekela by Saint and Macelba;, Sindizakusiya by Stain B featuring Mwanache and Loss by Kell Kay featuring Eli Njuchi and Young Kay.

== Recognition ==
Manyozo is regarded as one of the most notable producers in Malawi’s contemporary music industry.
