= Maso Awards =

Annual music industry award ceremony

- Current: Maso Awards 2023
- Awarded for: Outstanding achievements in the entertainment industry
- Country: Malawi
- Presented by: Malawi music industry coalition
- Hosted by: variety
- First award: January 10, 2019; 7 years ago
- Final award: 2023

Highlights
- Most awards: Faith Mussa
- Website: maso-awards.live

Maso Awards are Malawian music award show that was established in early 2019 to celebrate entertainers and other minorities in music, film, philanthropy and fashion. Maso awards are a brainchild of MASO Enterprise which is a company founded by Augustine Mukisi, Beaton Ndawa, Fedson Mwadala and Mphatso Tembo and handles event management and branding, graphics and social media management, web design... The event takes place in Malawian major cities and it is featured by performances from artists. They are one of the major Malawi's local music industry awards. The awards recognizes Malawian music from all genres, including gospel. The awards also promote culture and encourages people to showcase their talents. The awards categories are split into male and female.

== History ==
The Maso Awards started in the early 2019 by the Maso Enterprises aiming at promoting of local music talents within the country. The CEO of the awards is Augustine Mukisi. The winners receive a gold-plated statuette.

=== Artist of the Year ===
The Artist of the Year award is the highest and most prestigious of the awards given at the event given to the artist(s) following votes by the general public as having the highest audience appeal, online streaming, popularity and radio play. To be chosen as the artist of the year, the artist must have a released hit single/album during the year under review to be eligible.

== List of ceremonies ==
=== 2019 ===
The 2019 inaugural ceremony took place in Blantyre.

=== 2021 ===
The 2021 physical events took place in Lilongwe on 17 December 2021 after two years of holding the events online. The Maso Awards had over 13 categories. The Male Best upcoming of the year awards were given Driemo while the female was Niekay. The Best album award went to Phyzix for his album titled "Flaws". The Lifetime achievement were given to Lucius Banda, among other winners and categories.

=== 2022 ===
The 2022 Awards were expanded and had 16 more categories with at least 10 non-musical. The awards took place in Blantyre at Amaryllis Hotel on 26 November.

=== 2023 ===
The 2023 ceremony took place at Bingu International Conference in Lilongwe where more than 135 artists were nominated in 35 categories for the awards. Out of the total of 35 categories, 32 were permanent where as three were temporary with their addition to reflect the theme of the awards. Among the winners were Sir Paul Banda who took home the Lifetime Achievement Award. The Maso Humanitarian Award for the social media influencer were given to Pemphero Mphande. Among notable artists that won were Zeze Kingstone among others.

== Current award categories ==
=== Music ===
- Best New Female Artist
- Best New Male Artist
- Song of the Year
- Best Hip Hop Act
- Video of the Year
- Best Gospel Artist
- Producer of the Year
- Best Dancehall Act
- Album of the Year
- Female of the Year
- Male of the Year
- Best Duo/Group
- Lifetime Achievement

=== Media ===
- Best Radio DJ/Personality
- Best Entertainment writer
- Best TV personality
- Media Legend

=== Fashion ===
- Most Fashionable Celebrity
- Designer of the Year
- Model of the Year
- Living Legend
- Fashion Icon

== Host Cities ==
Year	Country	Host city	Venue	Host(s)
2019	Malawi	Blantyre	Golf Club	Joy Nathu
2021	Malawi	Comesa Hall, Blantyre	Golf Club	Chifundo Maganga
2022	Malawi	Lilongwe	BICC	
2023	Malawi	Lilongwe	BICC	

== Recipients ==
List of selected recipients and years:

Category	Nominee / work (and year)	Result	Reference
Song of the Year	Anana by Piksy (2022)	Won	
Best Collabo of the Year	Legends by Phyzix and Various Artists (2022)	Won	
Dj of the Year	Joy Nathu (2022)	Won	
Fashion Designer of the Year	Roy View (2022)	Won	
Music Video of the Year	Mojo by Driemo (2022)	Won	
Best Comedian	Che Mandota (2022)	Won	
Producer of the Year	Tactic (2022)	Won	
Life Time Achievement Award	Giddess Chalamanda (2022)	Won	
Poet of the year	Raphael Sitima (2022)	Won	
Best Male Artist	Driemo (2022)	Won	
Best Female Artist	Tuno (musician) (2022)	Won	
Best feature film	The Last Fishing Boat (2022)	Won	
Best Gospel Act	Suffix (2022)	Won	
Best Actress	Flora Suya (2022)	Won	
Media Personality of the Year	Priscilla Kayira (2022)	Won	
Best group/duo of the Year	Ace Jizzy and Beejay (2022)	Won	
Album of the Year	Red Flag by Eli Njuchi (2022)	Won	
Best sound engineer of the Year	John Nthakomwa (2022)	Won	
Best male upcoming artist	Zonke (2022)	Won	
Best female upcoming artist	Kellie Divine (2022)	Won	
Best Live Act	Tay Grin (2022)	Won	
Gospel Song of the Year	Mwandikondera by Suffix (2022)	Won	

== See also ==
- Nyasa Music Awards
- List of Malawian awards
- Music of Malawi
