= Zikomo Presidential Awards =

Annual music industry award ceremony

- Current: Zikomo Presidential Awards 2023
- Awarded for: Outstanding achievements in the entertainment industry and humanitarian
- Country: Malawi
- First award: May 11, 2021; 5 years ago
- Final award: 2023

Zikomo Presidential Awards are Malawian awards established in 2021 by the president of Malawi, Lazarus Chakwera, to celebrate organisations, individuals and entertainers and other minorities in music, film, philanthropy and fashion. The 2023 awards ceremony took place in Lilongwe at Kamuzu Palace. During the ceremony, the president said that the awards were appropriate to honor some of the country's outstanding social enterprises as well as social entrepreneurs that provide solutions to some of the challenges the country faces.

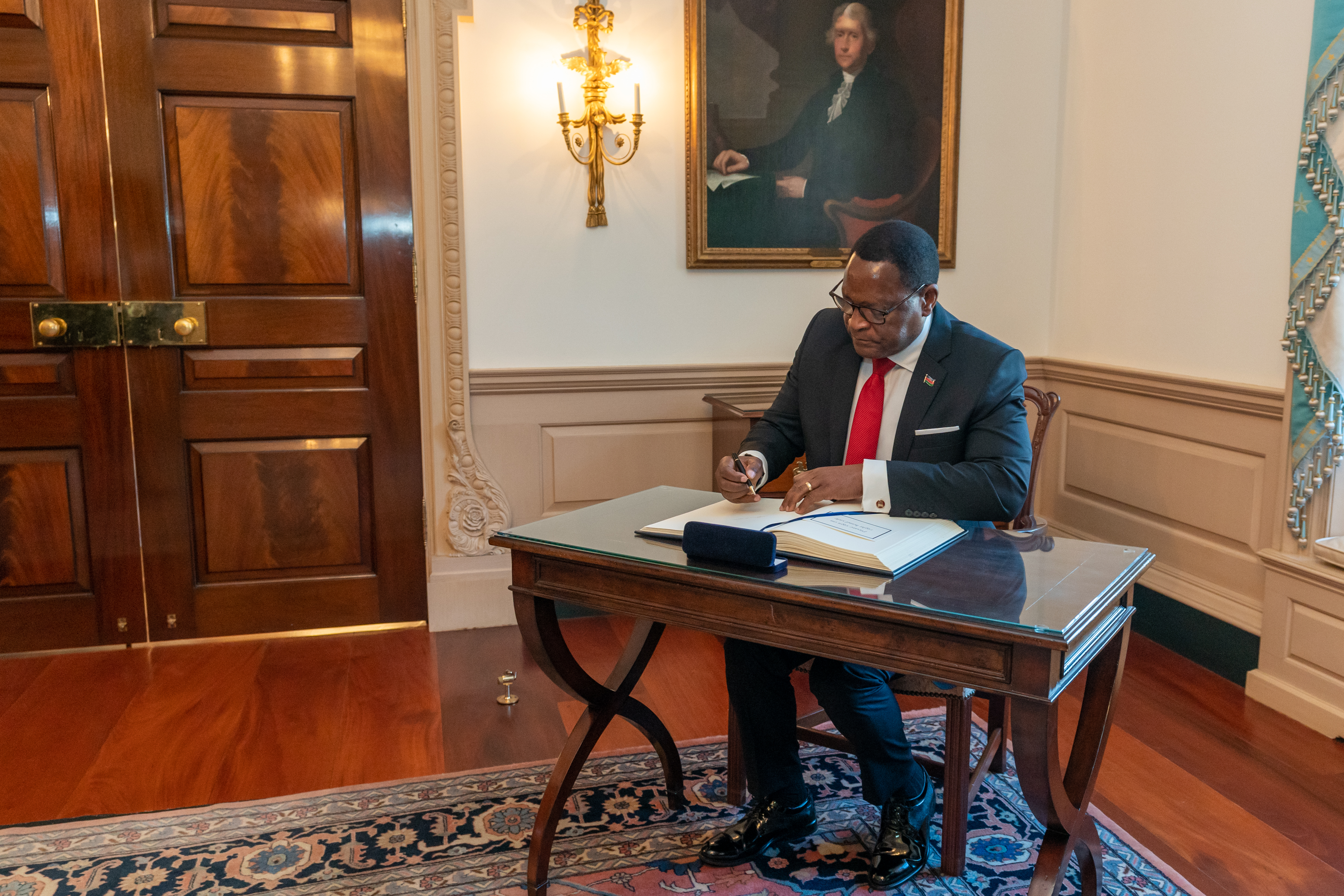
Founder of Zikomo Presidential Awards, Lazarus Chakwera.

The 2023 awardees were awarded due to their efforts in providing solutions through their various services such as youth employment, water supply, improving of living conditions of refugees and food security initiatives, as well as health including girl child education, among others.

== List of ceremonies ==
=== 2023 ===
The 2023 ceremony took place in Lilongwe, the capital of Malawi. Some of the notable awardees were renowned businessman as well as philanthropist, Napoleon Dzombe, who was recognised in several social enterprises. Dzombe is the founder of Blessing Private Hospital which offers health services to communities of Lilongwe as well as Dowa at affordable cost. He was also awarded for promotion of modern agricultural practices in Malawi.

Other awardees included different groups and individuals such as Uchembere Wabwino Group, Wandikweza, Henga-Phoka Water Association, Acades, Micromek Limited, Partners in Hope, Baseflow, Atsikana Paulendo, Tengani Water Association, Tingathe, Kibebe, as well as the Ministry of Sanitation and Water in Malawi.

=== 2022 ===
The 2022 awards took place in Lilongwe on Friday of 2 July 2022, where 21 individuals in fields of education, agriculture, and arts, and youth entrepreneurs under the age of 30 years were awarded at the ceremony. The president highlighted the benefits of promotion of talents for the national serviceon mere pursuit of the accolades.

During the ceremony, the late musician, Martse, was awarded for inspiring youths. Among other recipients in the media arts industry, were Enifa Chiwaya who was awarded for her acting as "Nanyoni" for her talent as well as dedication. In the agricultural sector, Chikoko Chirwa, was awarded for his effort in the expansion of the Kasangazi Irrigation Scheme. In the Education, founder of the Zowe Foundation, Temwa Msiska, was recognized for her supporting of over 285 vulnerable children in Malawi. Performances at the ceremony were led by Pisky with his song, It's 'Anana'.

== Host cities ==
Year	Country	Host city	Venue
2021	Malawi	Lilongwe	Kamuzu Palace
2022	Malawi	Lilongwe	Kamuzu Palace
2023	Malawi	Lilongwe	Kamuzu Palace

== See also ==
- Nyasa Music Awards
- List of Malawian awards
