= Joy Nathu =

Malawian radio DJ and presenter

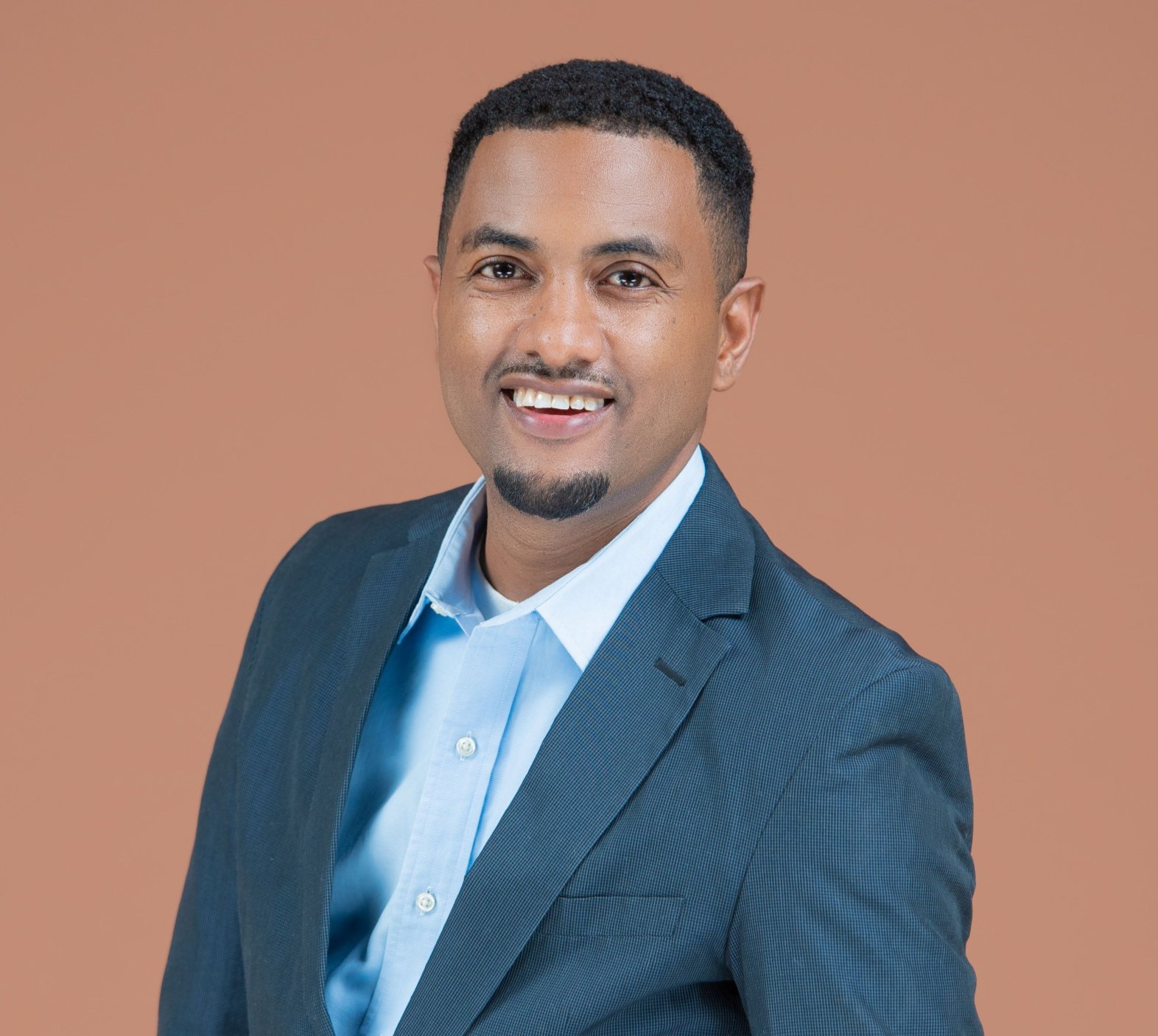
- Nathu in 2023
- Born: August 7, 1985 (age 40); Blantyre, Malawi
- Education: Blantyre Secondary School
- Alma mater: Bachelors Degree in Journalism; Blantyre International University
- Occupations: Radio DJ; Radio Presenter; Club DJ; Master of Ceremonies
- Years active: 2000–present
- Organization: MBC Malawi
- Known for: DJ, and radio presenting
- Notable work: Made on Monday programme

Joy Nathu is a Malawian radio DJ, producer, broadcaster and presenter. He won his first UMP Award in 2016 as the DJ of the year. In 2017 and 2018, Nathu also won the same awards and category. He won Radio DJ and Personality of the Year in 2019.

Nathu has also won 2 of Nyasa Music Awards for Best Radio DJ in 2017 and 2018. In 2022, Nathu won the Maso Award as the DJ of the year. He has worked with various other radio presenters such as, Priscilla Kayira, Anne Kadammanja and Juliet Royo.

Nathu is known to have started a radio show called 'Made on Monday' where he interviews different upcoming and notable artists.

== Background ==
Nathu was born on 7 September 1985, in Blantyre.

=== Education ===
Nathu obtained his Bachelors Degree of Journalism from the Blantyre International University in 2018. He attended the Malawi Institute of Journalism where he graduated with a Diploma in Journalism.

=== Career ===
==== 2000s: Early beginnings ====
As a native of Malawi's commercial city of Blantyre, Nathu started as a mobile DJ playing at parties, weddings and schools before he ventured into club Deejaying. His first notable gig took place Crossroads Bar and Grill in Blantyre where he used to mix on Sundays.

At the same time he joined Fanline Mix, a radio programme that used to be aired on Malawi's Radio 2 FM around 3pm and this is where he learnt presenting radio programmes together with his skill as the mobile and club DJ.

After leaving Fanline Mix, Nathu was hired by Youth Arm Organisation that used to produce and present a weekly magazine show and this is where he learnt how to record, mix, edit and produce programmes as well as write scripts for radio.

In year 2002, he was recruited by M.B.C to join Radio 2 FM as a part-time DJ. After a year later, Nathu was given a contract as a full time DJ, presenter and producer. In mid 2000's, he co-hosted a radio show with Ephraim Nyirenda called 'Beats, Rhymes and Battles' that was hugely followed by music enthusiasts.

==== 2010s: Success and birth of Made on Monday programme ====
In early 2016, Nathu launched his new radio show called 'Made On Monday' which became and instant hit with listeners. The show mostly followed by the youth is a number one go to show for urban music lovers in Malawi because of its mix of good music, humour and all telling interviews with top Malawian artists and celebrities. Besides the radio, he has also hosted many events including album launches for artists such as Gwamba, Eli Njuchi and Erik Paliani. He has also hosted Ufulu Festival in Lilongwe in years 2019, 2020 and 2022, Fussion Ovation Festival in Lilongwe and Lake Of Stars Festival in Salima in 2019. In 2017, he hosted The UMP Awards Festival in 2017 and the Airtel Malawi Facebook Party in 2020 as a 'stay at home' entertainment package during the Covid 19 pandemic.

In 2023 Joy won an award for DJ of The Year at the MBC Entertainers of The Year Awards.

In December 2024, Joy Nathu won 3 awards at MBC Entertainers of The Year Awards. He won Radio Personality of Year (Male), DJ of the Year and his 'Made On Monday' radio show won Best Radio Programme.

In December 2024 Joy Nathu was appointed as Brand Ambassador for Premier Bet alongside musician ELi Njuchi.

== Achievements ==
=== UMP Awards ===
Year	Nominee / work	Award	Result
2016	Himself	Best Radio DJ	Won
2017	Himself	Best Radio DJ	Won
2018	Himself	Best Radio DJ	Won
2019	Himself	Best Radio DJ	Won

=== Nyasa Music Awards ===
Year	Nominee / work	Award	Result
2017	Himself	Best Radio DJ	Won
2018	Himself	Best Radio DJ	Won

=== Maso Awards ===
Year	Nominee / work	Award	Result
2022	Himself	DJ of the year	Won

== Personal life ==
Nathu is married and lives in Blantyre, the city in which he was born and raised.

== See also ==
- Mingoli Music Bash
