= BFB =

BFB may refer to:

== Entertainment ==
- Beat for Beat, a Norwegian musical variety show
- "Best Friend's Brother", a 2011 single by Victoria Justice
- Blood for Blood, an American hardcore punk band
- BFB (producer), Malawian record producer
- Battle for B.F.D.I. or Battle for B.F.B., season 4 of Battle for Dream Island
  - "B.F.B. = Back from Beginning", a 2021 episode of the above season
- Brutal Flying Behemoth, a type of Bloon in the Bloons Tower Defense series

== Transportation ==
- Benjamin Franklin Bridge (Delaware River Bridge), a bridge over the Delaware River connecting Philadelphia to Camden
- Bridge Formula B, a formula used in the US for calculating maximum allowable vehicle loads on bridges
- Bulleid Firth Brown wheel, a type of locomotive wheel used on Britain's Southern Railway

== Other uses ==
- Bacterial fruit blotch, cucurbit plant infection
- Birleşik Fon Bankası, public bank belonging to TMSF in Turkey
- Breakage-fusion-bridge, a biological process inducing genome instability
- Bubbling fluidized bed combustion
- bfb, the ISO 639-3 code for the Pauri Bareli language

== See also ==
- Blood for Blood (disambiguation)
