= List of Malawian awards =

Malawian Awards List

This is a list of the various award ceremonies held in Malawi to reward people in the entertainment, arts, football, fashion, entrepreneurship and other sectors.

- Maso Awards
- Nyasa Music Awards
- UMP Awards
- MAM Awards
- Malawi National Awards
- Malawi Hip Hop Awards
- Chirunga Awards
- MUMA Awards
- Malawi Gin Competition
- AGMA Awards
- Malawi Special Achievers Award
- Zikomo Presidential Awards
- Kwacha Awards
- Ku Mingoli Bash

== See also ==
- Lists of awards
