= Tigris (singer) =

Malawian singer and rapper

- Born: Angela Mizinga; May 14, 1988 (age 38)
- Origin: Ntcheu District, Malawi
- Genres: Hip hop
- Occupations: Rapper, singer

Angela Mizinga (known as Empress Tigris or simply Tigris) is a Malawian singer and rapper from Ntcheu, Malawi.

== Early life ==
Mizinga was born on 14 May 1988 as the last of ten children, in Ntcheu District.

== Career ==
Mizinga began her entertainment career as a radio presenter for Capital FM radio.

She became popular as a singer after featuring in "Anankabango" - with singer Young Kay and other singers. She did charity work by raising funds for primary education and she donated food and other items to children at Mzuzu Central Hospital.

Her debut album was released in February 2010 and featured collaborations with popular Malawi rappers and singers, Theo Thomson, Tay Grin and Young Kay. She featured in many shows within and outside Malawi. She has been to Johannesburg, Graham's town, Zambia and performed alongside artists including US's Sean Kingston, Brick and Lace, Teargas, Tay Grin and Theo Thomson. She sang at the Big Brother Amplified Eviction show in 2011 and she has appeared in the Lake of Stars festivals.

Tigris was a nominee for the Malawi Music Awards for Best Female Artist and Best Afro-Pop Artist of 2010–2011. She started her career as a professional musician in August 2009 and already has an album called Gimme a Break. Her singles made the charts and stayed in the top 3 for several weeks on Capitol Radio. Her song 'Hottest Chick', which she did with Tay Grin, was at number one. Her second album, Dreams, came out in 2011.

In 2012 she was one of the judges on audition day for the E-Wallet Talent search in Blantyre. The show was scheduled for September. In 2019 she was singing cover songs as part of ‘The Bachelor’ a South Africa reality show on MultiChoice Malawi.

In 2019, she and fellow Malawian singer, Janta, recorded a duet where the song was about the need to save the lives of tigers. The recording was created in partnership with the Lilongwe Wildlife trust and Conservation Music Malawi. The number of tigers has fallen significantly and their song highlighted the issue. Their song was released on World Lion Day which is 10 August.

In 2020 she released a song about climate change.

== Discography ==
- Anankabango - Young Kay featuring Tigris
- Gimme a Break (album) - 2010
- Dreams (Album) - 2012
