= BFB (producer) =

Malawian record producer and musician

Black Falcon Bird
- Also known as: Blaq Falcon Bird, BFB, Blaq Falcon Bird Mw
- Born: Jeremy Matewere; Blantyre, Malawi
- Origin: Blantyre, Malawi
- Genres: Hip hop, Dancehall, Reggae, Afrobeat
- Occupations: Record producer, songwriter, rapper, vocalist, keyboardist, audio engineer
- Instruments: Vocals, keyboard
- Years active: 2006–present
- Labels: Independent; Exclusive Studios

Black Falcon Bird (also styled Blaq Falcon Bird and commonly known by the initialism BFB) is a Malawian record producer, recording artist, songwriter and keyboardist. In 2017, he was nominated as a best producer of the year in Nyasa Music Awards.

== Background ==
Born Jeremy Matewere in Blantyre, he is best known in Malawi's urban and reggae/dancehall scenes for both his solo recordings and production work for other Malawian artists.

== Career ==
BFB began his career in the mid-2000s, as a multi-instrumentalist and producer in Malawi's urban music scene. He has released solo material and worked as a record producer for other artists in Malawi, producing singles and full EPs and albums recorded and mixed at his studios.

=== Production ===
In 2014, he is credited with producing the song "Friendzone" for Evanz Muzik, recorded at Exclusive Studios.

BFB produced Blasto's 2017 EP Persistence, with production, recording, mixing and mastering credits attributed to him for several tracks; that EP later received distribution assistance through Tuff Gong International.

He has collaborated with both local and regional artists, including work with South African rappers and has released a number of singles and music videos as a lead artist. His 2016 single "Whatsapp" and other releases were covered by Malawian music press as examples of his "local touch" sound.

== Notable production credits ==
- Blasto — Persistence (EP) (2017).
- Evanz Muzik — "Friendzone" (produced at Exclusive Studios).
- Various singles and collaborative tracks with artists such as Fredokiss, Blazzy Tone and Gwamba.

== Awards and recognition ==
- Nominated for Producer of the Year at the UMP Awards (2017).
- Recognized by Malawi Music awards directories as a leading urban producer in the mid-2010s.
- BFB productions have been included in projects distributed internationally through Tuff Gong International (Blasto's Persistence EP, 2017).
- Mentioned in relation to the 2017 UMP Awards (Producer of the Year).

== Selected discography ==
=== Albums/EPs (as primary artist) ===
- Vicious Man (album, 2015).

=== Selected singles (as lead artist) ===
- "Whatsapp" (single, 2016).
- "Last" (single, 2021).

=== Selected production (as producer for other artists) ===
- Blasto — Persistence (EP) (2017).
- Evanz Muzik — "Friendzone" (2014).

== Studios and business ==
BFB is associated with and has recorded at Exclusive Studios, where he has worked as producer, mix engineer and mastering engineer on multiple projects.
