= Malinga Mafia =

Malawian artist

- Born: Chiku Malinga Chitsundi Banda; July 17, 1994 (age 32); Lilongwe, Malawi
- Genres: Dancehall
- Occupations: Musician songwriter
- Years active: 2000–present
- Partner: None

Chiku Malinga Chitsundi Banda (born August 17, 1994), best known as Malinga Mafia, is a Malawian dancehall artist and songwriter. In 2018, he won a Nyasa Music Award as Best Dancehall artist of the year. His collaboration with Hyphen titled Tsidya lina (other coast) won the Best collaboration of the year 2018. In 2017, he won the Best Music Video in Nyasa Music Awards. In 2016, he was awarded a UMP Award for Album of the Year as well as Best Reggae/Dancehall Act in years 2017 and 2018.

== Background ==
=== Early life ===
Banda was born on 17 August 1994, in Lilongwe in a family of 6 children. He did his primary school education in three schools namely, Mphanje Private Primary School, Chidothi CCAP Primary School and Chimutu L.E.A. He did his secondary school at Mkwichi Secondary in Dowa. He obtained a Diploma in IT (Software Programming and Web Design) from National College of Information Technology (Malawi).

== Music career ==
Banda started music when he was still in primary at Chidothi CCAP Primary School, under influence of his brothers Yung Degree and Kinton who were also Dancehall. He recorded his first single "Bwera" (come) in 2008 when he was at Dowa Secondary school. In 2010, he joined Mabilinganya Empire after being recruited by its founder member, Black Sta.

Banda was in the Mabilinganya Empire for two years (from 2010 to 2013). He has worked with different artists such Gwamba and Fredokiss, among others.

== Controversies ==
The remix of Banda titled 'Levels Remix' featuring Fredokiss, Martse, Malcelba and others drew debate and criticism as its lyrics were mixed with illuminate views.

== Achievements ==
=== Nyasa Music Awards ===
| Year | Nominee / work | Award | Result |
|---|---|---|---|
| 2018 | Himself | Best Dancehall artist of the year | Won |
| 2018 | Tsidya lina – Hyphen ft Malinga Mafia | Best collaboration of the year | Won |

=== UMP Awards ===
| Year | Nominee / work | Award | Result |
|---|---|---|---|
| 2016 | Himself | Best Dancehall Artist | Nominated |
| 2016 | Levels remix- Malinga featuring Various artists | Video of the Year | Nominated |
| 2016 | Himself | Artist of the Year | Nominated |
| 2016 | Levels Remix- Malinga Mafia featuring Various Artists | Song of the Year | Nominated |
| 2016 | Flawless Heart- Malinga Mafia | Album of the Year | Nominated |
| 2016 | Himself | Best Dancehall Artist | Nominated |
| 2016 | Himself | Best Dancehall Artist | Nominated |

== See also ==
- Fredokiss (musician)
