= Luna MC =

Malawian radio broadcaster

Luna MC is a Malawian radio broadcaster, presenter and television personality. In 2019, Luna won the Personality of the Year along with Priscilla Kayira and Sharon Chirwa in UMP Media Awards. In 2018, Luna won best tv presenter of the year in Nyasa Music Awards.
