= Che Wikise =

Malawian artist

- Born: Frank Chawinga; September 18, 1992 (age 34); Lilongwe, Malawi
- Genre: Afrobeat
- Occupations: Musician songwriter
- Years active: 2000–present

Frank Chawinga (born September 18, 1992), best known as Che Wikise, is a Malawian singer, songwriter and comedian. In 2019, he was awarded as the artist of the year in UMP Awards and his song "Chikam’phukire" (Back to the sender) was awarded as the song of the year 2019.

Chawinga got national recognition in Malawi in 2017 after he released a song titled "Shabarakatari" (Tongues).

He collaborated with Zambian famous artists General Kanene, Chimzy Kelly and Marky2 in a song titled 'Uli mzingati" (How much do you have).

== Background ==
=== Early life ===
Chawinga was born on 18 September 1992, at Likuni Hospital in Lilongwe. His home village is Hewe in Rumphi District and is a Tumbuka by tribe. He did his primary school in Lilongwe as well as his secondary school education.

== Music career ==
Chawinga started singing in 2003 and gained national recognition after he released his single titled "Shabarakatari". He released his funny video of Shabarakati where he played Wikise, a pastor, which turned him into a household name. This resulted in him releasing another video under the persona of preacher called "Galamukani" (awake) which saw success in the country.

Chawinga has collaborated with various artists on successful songs such as Yonzo, among others.

In 2022, Chawinga called on Non-Governmental Organizations to support his mental health awareness campaign, ‘I Can’t Kill Myself’ which helps people seek mental support to avoid suicide.

== Achievements ==
=== UMP Awards ===
Year	Nominee / work	Award	Result
2019	Himself	Artist of the year	Won
2019	Chikam’phukire	Song of the year	Won
