= Ku Mingoli Bash =

Literary festival

Ku Mingoli Bash Festival Ku Mingoli
- Status: Active
- Genre: Music festival
- Frequency: Annually
- Venue: Grand Business Park
- Locations: Blantyre, Malawi
- Coordinates: 13°59′S 33°47′E
- Country: Malawi
- Years active: 2023 to presesnt
- Inaugurated: 2023
- Founder: Shadreck Kalukusha
- Most recent: November 4, 2023
- Next event: 2024 Mingoli Music Festival
- Attendance: 14,000
- Organizer: Sound Addicts
- Sponsors: Tecno Mobile

Ku Mingoli Bash Festival is a Malawian music festival that features 10 Malawian artists and four international headliners. The 2024 bash took place at Civo Stadium, Lilongwe, and included South African artists such as Casper Nyovest and Young Stunna. Tay Grin was also a headliner, and the bash also featured Temwa, a Malawian hip hop artist.

== History ==
Mingoli Bash Festival started in early 2022 by Shadreck Kalukusha, founder of Sound Addicts, as a way to promote tourism and improve the local economy.

== Festivals, themes and winners ==
=== 2023 edition ===
Ku Mingoli Bash 2023 took place in Lilongwe with foreign performances from South Africa's duo of Blaq Diamond and Daliwonga who warmed up the stage for night's headline artist from Zambia, Yo Maps. At first, the show was to take place at the Civo Stadium but was moved to Lilongwe Golf Club and then later to Grand Business Park. The performances started at 1pm with events host Annie Matumbi who manned the stage. Notable local artists included Driemo who was also a marveled to watch with his fans asking for more as he was about to leave the stage. It was organised by Shadreck Kalukusha, a member of Sound Addicts Group. Other local artists who performed were Kell Kay, Eli Njuchi, Zeze Kingston, Gibo Pearson, Temwa, Black Missionaries Band and Tuno.

=== 2024 edition ===
Organizers unveiled plans for the new iteration of the event which is set for August 3, 2024 at Lilongwe's Civil Stadium. Shadreck Kalukusha, the executive director of organizing partner, Sound Addict, confirmed the performances by South African rapper Casper Nyovest as well as vocalist Young Stunna who will headline musical showcase. Some of confirmed local artists are award-winning afro-pop singer Zeze Kingstone, Lulu, Pop Young, Sean Morgan, Kelly Divine, Tay Grin, Saint and Gibo Pearson. The festival will be sponsored by Tecno, a mobile provider with an intention to support Malawian musicians and at the same time expanding the company's reach.

== See also ==
- Nyasa Music Awards
- Joy Nathu
