= Malawi Council of Churches =

- Abbreviation: MCC
- Formation: 1942; 84 years ago
- Type: NGO
- Location: Lilongwe
- Coordinates: 13.985°S 33.761°E
- Members: 36 (2012)
- Formerly called: Christian Council of Nyasaland

The Malawi Council of Churches is a member of the World Council of Churches. It is an umbrella organisation of a number of Christian churches in Malawi. It was founded in 1942 when it was called the Christian Council of Nyasaland.

== History ==
In 1939 there had been a consulting committee of Federation Missions, but the date of 1942 is given as the founding date of what was then called the Christian Council of Nyasaland. After independence the name became the Christian Council of Malawi.

The organisation changed its name to Malawi Council of Churches. It is said to be the largest ecumenical organisation in Malawi.

In 2012 there were a 36 organisations that were members and 24 of those were churches. The organisation was led by General Secretary, Rev. Dr. Osborne Joda-Mbewe and Bishop Joseph Bvumbwe who leads the Malawi's Evangelical Lutheran Church. Joda-Mbewe spoke out in 2013 on behalf of the churches noting how concerned the council were at the level of institutional corruption. He wrote to the Anti-Corruption Bureau noting that corruption was undermining the country's development. The council also asked the Police Service to reduce the rate of robbery.

In 2018 the High Court ruled that the council was found to have unfairly dismissed Bertha Sefu when she was suspended (years before) largely without pay for 18 months pending an investigation that never took place.

The council's general secretary in 2023 was Rev Alemekezeke Chikondi Phiri and he helped to organise four protest marches in Malawi's cities against "the sin of homosexuality". The subject was topical as Jana Gonani, a transgender woman was on trial and she was supported by the pressure group Nyasa Rainbow Alliance.

The council is a member of the World Council of Churches and Malawi's Public Affairs Committee.
