= Madalitso =

Madalitso may refer to:

- Madalitso Muthiya (born 1983), Zambian golfer
- Madalitso Mkoloma (born 1985), Barbudan soccer player
- Madalitso Food Production, a Malawaian company owned by Napoleon Dzombe
- Madalitso (album), a 2018 album by Edith WeUtonga
- HD 85390 b (planet), Star Natasha, Constellation Vela; an exoplanet named after the Zambian Nyanja-language term for blessings
