= Agnes Nyalonje =

Malawian politician

Agness Nyalonje
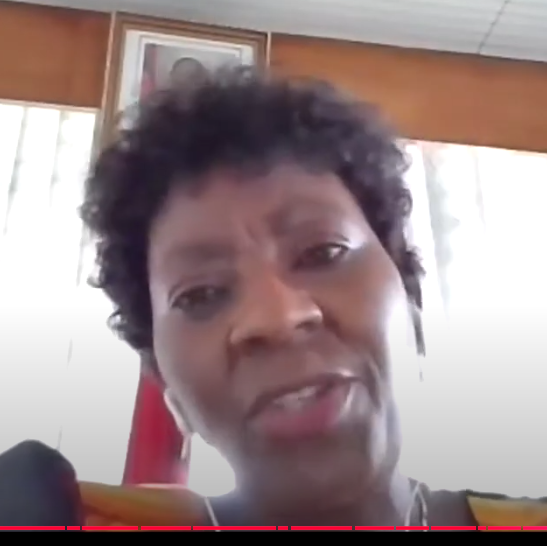
- via zoom in 2020
- Citizenship: Malawi
- Education: University of Edinburgh and University of Malawi
- Occupations: lecturer, politician
- Employer(s): University of Edinburgh], University of Malawi
- Known for: Minister for Education
- Political party: UTM Party et al
- Spouse: Robert Ridley

Agnes Nyalonje is a Malawian politician who has served as the country's Education Minister from July 2020. In 2023 she was the Minister of Labour. She offered her resignation and it was accepted by the President at the end of 2024.

== Education ==
Nyalonje has a Bachelor of Arts and a Bachelor of Social Science from the University of Malawi, a postgraduate diploma in personal and development from the University of Edinburgh and a master's degree in literature from the University of Leeds.

== Career ==
Nyalonje was a lecturer in linguistics at the University of Edinburgh and at the University of Malawi. She worked as a consultant for the World Bank and as country director of UNAIDS from 2002 to 2004. She was also a technical adviser to the World Health Organization in South Africa.

=== Political career ===
Nyalonje was elected as the MP for Mzimba North representing the People's Party in 2014. She joined the newly formed UTM Party in October 2018, saying she was seeking to "fight rampant corruption" and overthrow the ruling Democratic Progressive Party. However, she withdrew from participating in the January 2019 primary elections.

Nyalonje was appointed Minister of Education by President Lazarus Chakwera on 8 July 2020. She retained the position in a January 2022 reshuffle. On commencing the role, Nyalonje said her priority was to overhaul the country's "rotten and archaic" education system, which has one of the lowest transition rates in the world, with only 6% of primary school students graduating to secondary school.

Nyalonje oversaw the reopening of schools on 7 September 2020 after their closure in March that year due to the COVID-19 pandemic.

The United Nations Technology Bank for Least Developed Countries and the Network of African Science Academies created the Academy of Sciences in Malawi in 2021 in collaboration with the NCST and her Ministry's Directorate of Science, Technology, and Innovation. Nyalonje expected the new academy to work closely with government bodies while retaining its independence.

In February 2022, she launched a Code of Conduct for teachers that seeks to regulate professional conduct across the education sector. In June 2021, Nyalonje was sent out of Parliament for not wearing a school uniform as all other female members had done to mark the Day of the African Child and advocate for female education.

In 2023 she was the Minister of Labour.

She offered her resignation in July 2024 and it was accepted by President Chakwera at the end of 2024.

== Personal life ==
Nyalonje is married to Robert Ridley, who is vice chancellor at Unicaf University Malawi.
