= Eli Njuchi =

Malawian singer

- Born: Chifuniro Steven Magalasi; July 23, 2001 (age 24); Lilongwe, Malawi
- Other name: Eli Njuchi
- Occupations: Singer; songwriter; rapper; dancer
- Years active: 2015–present
- Awards: 2018 UMP Awards in Best New Act (won)
- Musical career
- Genres: R&B; Dancehall; pop
- Instrument: Vocals
- Label: Mikozi

Chifuniro Steven Magalasi (born July 23, 2001), best professionally known as Eli Njuchi, is a Malawian singer, songwriter, rapper, and dancer. In 2018, he won a UMP Award in Best New Act. In 2019, he won another UMP award as the best male of the year.

Magalasi has made several collaborations with different artists such as the gospel rapper, 'Suffix' and AK in the remix of his song titled 'Illuminati'.

== Background ==
=== Early life ===
Magalasi was born on July 23, 2001, in Lilongwe. He was born in a family of six children where he is the third born. He is a distant relative of the late Malawian dancehall star 'Mafunyeta', whose real name was Patrick Magalasi.

== Music career ==
Magalasi started his music career in primary school when he began rapping under the name "Stevovo" along with his close friend Veda. He recorded his first track in 2015 titled “never leave you”.

Later on, he formed a music group called 'Njuchi Muzik Group', also known as 'Njuchi StingDem'. The group has 3 artists including Chizmo and Coctiz.

== Achievements ==
=== UMP Awards ===
Year	Nominee / work	Award	Result
2019	Himself	Male Artist of the Year	Won
2018	Himself	Best New Act	Won
2018	Toast ft Eli Njuchi – ‘Hakuna Matata’	Collaboration of the Year	Nominated
2025	Cifu	Best Album of the Year	Won

== See also ==
- Sangie
- Suffix (musician)
