= Emmie Deebo =

Malawian Afrobeat and Afro-pop singer-songwriter

- Born: Emily Zintambila; May 14, 1992 (age 34); Blantyre, Malawi
- Origin: Blantyre, Malawi
- Genres: Afrobeat, Afropop, R&B
- Occupations: Singer-songwriter, performer
- Instrument: Vocals
- Years active: 2022–present
- Label: Akometsi Entertainment

Emily Zintambila (born 14 May 1996), professionally known as Emmie Deebo, is a Malawian Afrobeat and Afropop singer-songwriter. She is signed under Akometsi Entertainment and is best known for her debut album First Born (2025), which includes collaborations with Gemini Major, Zeze Kingston, Sean Morgan and Bee Jay. She has been described as one of the rising stars of Malawi's contemporary music scene.

== Early life and education ==
Emmie Deebo was born as Emily Zintambila in Blantyre, Southern Malawi. She grew up listening to a wide range of African pop and gospel music, which influenced her vocal style and songwriting. In [2025], Emmie-Deebo graduated from the University of Lilongwe, where she pursued [Bachelor's Degree in Social Work].

== Career ==
Emmie Deebo began her professional career around 2022 with singles such as Beke and Musa. She released the Reflection EP in 2023, showcasing her Afrobeat and R&B influences.

In 2025 she released her debut studio album First Born, a 12-track record that includes Katatu featuring Gemini Major, Eyo (Remix) featuring Zeze Kingston, Hustle Vibes with Sean Morgan, and Zinyama with Bee Jay and Kumatikhala.

== Musical style ==
Her sound is characterised by a fusion of Afrobeat, Afropop and R&B rhythms. Lyrically, she often addresses themes of love, resilience, and everyday struggles.

== Performances ==
Emmie Deebo has performed at local festivals in Malawi and internationally, including the Zanzibar International Youth Tourism Summit and the Zanzibar Awards Gala Night in Tanzania, where she represented Malawi.

== Discography ==
=== Albums ===
- First Born (2025)

=== Extended plays ===
- Reflection (2023)

=== Selected singles ===
- Beke (2022)
- Musa (2023)
- Eyo (2024)
- Tikudziweni (2024)
- Chilipo (2024)
- Changa (2024)
- Befu (2024)
- Mtima (2025)
- First Born (2025)

== Recognition ==
Her debut album and performances have been praised for bringing a sound to Malawi's music scene. She has been highlighted as one of the new generation of female voices pushing Malawian Afrobeat to international audiences.
