= Robert Ridley =

- Education: Cambridge University et al
- Occupations: researcher, academic
- Employer(s): Hoffman-La Roche, World Health Organisation,Medicines for Malaria Venture et al
- Known for: Malaria research and vice chancellor
- Spouse: Agnes Nyalonje

Robert Ridley is a research scientist who worked for the World Health Organization helping to create the Medicines for Malaria Venture. He has had several leadership positions at universities in Malawi. He became the Vice Chancellor at the Unicaf University in Lilongwe in Malawi in 2018.

== Life ==
Ridley graduated from the University of Cambridge in 1977 and went on to take a doctorate in bio-organic chemistry at the University of Wolverhampton in 1980.

Ridley specialised in the development of treatments for malaria at Hoffman-La Roche. He took leave from that research to work for the World Health Organization as Medicines for Malaria Venture was launched in 1999. He was a key figure in its establishment and he became the company's Chief Scientific Officer until 2001. In 2002 he published a paper in the British journal Nature about the work required for anti-malarial drugs.

The World Health Organisation created the Special Programme for Research and Training in Tropical Disease in the 1970s, and in 2004, Ridley became its director.

Ridley, as vice chancellor, defended a proposed rise in fees at Mzuzu University after student protests in 2016.

In 2018 he left Mzuzu as he was appointed as the deputy vice chancellor at the UNICAF campus in Lilongwe. His appointment was disputed by another candidate who took out a court case against the university. The rejected candidate claimed that the university had ignored some of his qualifications.

His university established itself and its sixth cohort of students graduated with degrees in 2025 at the Bingu International Conference Centre. Ridley has encouraged his students to read widely.
