= Zeze Kingston =

Malawian singer

- Born: Robert Ching'anda; March 26, 1993 (age 32); Blantyre, Malawi
- Other names: Zeze; ZZ
- Occupations: Singer; songwriter; rapper; dancer; television personality
- Years active: 2002–present
- Works: Daredevilz discography; Zeze Kingston videography
- Children: 2
- Musical career
- Genres: R&B; Amapiano; pop
- Instrument: Vocals
- Labels: Serato/MMM

Zeze Kingston (born Robert Ching'anda, March 26, 1993) is a Malawian Afropiano singer, songwriter and television personality. In 2023, he won Male Artist of the Year at the Maso Awards that took place at BICC in Lilongwe. He also won Best Live Act.

== Biography ==
Kingston was born on March 26, 1993, in Lilongwe and raised in Blantyre. He completed his primary schooling in Blantyre as well as his secondary school education.

Kingston started his music career as a producer in Malawi around 2011. In December 2022, Kingston released his EP titled "In My Zone" following the massive success of the song "Mvetsela," which featured Temwah and Jillz. After winning Male Artist of the Year, Kingston said that he owed his success to South Africa's Amapiano.

== Achievements ==
=== Maso Awards ===
| Year | Nominee / work | Award | Result |
|---|---|---|---|
| 2023 | Maso Awards | Best Male Artist of the Year | Won |
| 2023 | Maso Awards | Best Live Act | Won |

== Personal life ==
Kingston is married to Dorothy Shonga.

== See also ==
- Sangie
