= Juliet Royo =

Malawian radio presenter and broadcaster

Juliet Royo was a Malawian radio presenter and broadcaster. She gained national recognition in Malawi when she worked on Radio 2 FM and worked with Joy Nathu and Anne Kadammanja. She died in 2021.

Royo was a Malawi Broadcasting Corporation (MBC) Online Editor and MBC Radio 2 presenter.

She was one of the best radio personalities in Malawi. She was also known to have created a program called Spotlight on MBC that attracted many listeners.

== See also ==
- Joy Nathu
- Priscilla Kayira
- Anne Kadammanja
