= Sharon Chirwa =

Malawian author and television personality

- Citizenship: Malawi
- Occupations: Writer; Television personality

Sharon Chirwa is a Malawian author and television personality.

== Life ==
Chirwa was born in Mzuzu. She is a Tumbuka by tribe. She was the first daughter born to Kelvin and Edith Chirwa. She graduated with a degree in mass communication in 2017 from the African Bible College. She lives in Kawale Township.

She is associated with the "Wise and Noble Woman movement". In 2002 her book "Becoming a Wise and Noble Woman" was published. In 2019, Chirwa was nominated as the Personality of the Year along with Luna and Priscilla Kayira in UMP Media Awards. In 2020, she was nominated for Best Female TV Personality.
