= Chiradzulu =

Town in Malawi

Coordinates: 15°42′S 35°11′E

Chiradzulu is a town in Malawi, and the administrative capital of the Chiradzulu District.

It is famous because it is where the home and church of John Chilembwe is located. It was the site of European farming settlement.

== Notable people ==
- John Chilembwe
- Giddess Chalamanda
