= Onesimus Muzik =

Musical artist based in malawi

- Born: Armstrong Kalua; April 29, 1991 (age 35); Blantyre, Malawi
- Occupations: Afropop singer, songwriter
- Years active: 2012–present
- Label: Muthaland Entertainment

Armstrong Kalua (born April 29, 1991), professionally known as Onesimus Muzik, is a Malawi-born Afropop singer and songwriter.

== Early life ==
Kalua was born in Rumphi district in the Northern Region of Malawi. He is of Tumbuka ethnicity. He started singing at the age of 13. He started his music interest by performing at different concerts around his community.

== Music career ==
Kalua started his music interest in 2008 when he joined the rap group called Blessed Beyond Measure (also BBM Clique), dropping tracks such as "By MySide" and "Random Thoughts" with the outfit. He ventured into a solo career soon after, working on an unreleased hip-hop mixtape called Beyond Limits for a year in 2009 before he found his true calling, music.

Kalua started singing secular music in 2010 and finally released two singles: "Beautiful", featuring award-winning Malawian rapper Young Kay; and "Without Your Love", which landed him a coveted deal with the record company Nde’feyo Entertainment. Almost instantly thereafter he began his tour in Malawi under the stable, in 2011. He dropped a R&B mixtape titled BRB in 2012 and, in the same year, dropped his debut Afro R&B album, Ndele.

He also recorded a song called "Musiye Ayende" with Zambian musicians Dalisoul and Afunika. He has shared stages with Africa's music industry giants such as Oliver Mtukudzi, Freshlyground, Salif Keita, Professor, AKA, and Naeto C.

== Awards ==
Year	Award ceremony	Prize	Work/recipient	Result
2019	African Inspirational Music Awards	Best Male Artist	Himself	Won
2019	Malawi Music Awards	Winner Song of the Year	Himself	Won
2019	Malawi Music Awards	Winner Best Male Artist	Himself	Won
2019	Malawi Music Awards	Winner Best Ringtones	Himself	Won
2022	AFRIMA Awards	Best Male Artist	Himself	Won
2024	Zikomo International Awards	Best Male (Southern Africa)	Himself	Won
2024	MASO Awards	Song of the Year	Himself	Nominated
2024	MASO Awards	Artist of the Year	Himself	Nominated
2024	MASO Awards	Best Collaboration	Himself	Nominated
2024	HAPA Awards	Best Male Artist	Himself	Won
2024	Shinning Star Africa Awards	Best Male Artist	Himself	Won
2024	Music Video Africa Awards	Song of the Year	Himself	Won
