= Faith Mussa =

Malawian Afro-soul singer

- Born: Faith Ambudye Che Muphuwa Mussa; 10 August 1985 (age 40); Blantyre, Malawi
- Genres: Afro-soul; Afrobeat
- Occupations: Musician songwriter
- Years active: 2000–present

Faith Ambudye Che Muphuwa Mussa (born 10 August 1985) is a Malawian Afro-soul singer, guitarist and songwriter. He won his first award in August 2004 in Chirunga Awards as the best male singer. In 2018, he won two UMP Awards in Best Live Act as well as Best Afro-soul Artist/Group. In 2016, was nominated for the same category and award. In 2013, he won a National award for his best single titled "Desperate". In 2017, his song titled "Mdidi" won the Best Single in Nyasa Music Awards. In 2018, he won another award again in Best Live Act.

== Background ==
=== Early life ===
Mussa was born on 10 August 1985, in Ndirande, Blantyre.

== Music career ==
Mussa began his music career in his village of Ndirande in Blantyre when he was young after being heavily influenced by his own parents who at the time were performing in the 'Mussa Family'. When Mussa was 10 years old, he started teaching himself to play drums and home-made gallon guitars as well as milk-tins while imitating the tunes from radio along with his friends and siblings. His music career took off with the launching of his debut solo studio album titled, “Desperate,” after few years of playing in his family band.

Mussa has performed at some of the world's biggest and prestigious festivals, including Northern Norway's Arts Festival, Glastonbury, Sauti za Busara 2019, Lake of Stars, World Fest California, Tumaini Festival, and many others.

Mussa has received various important prizes in Malawi, including the Nyasa Award 2017 for best song of the year, the Malawi Special Achievers Award 2017, and the MAM Award 2013 for the best song of the year.

Mussa's style of music is the combination of African traditional vibes with the modern sound.

=== Collaboration with Organisations ===
Mussa has worked with several organisations such as the UNICEF, UNFPA, PLAN International, UNITED PURPOSE, OXFAM and is the current an ambassador for the World Vision Malawi that conducts campaigns to against child abuse and marriages.

== Achievements ==
=== UMP Awards ===
Year	Nominee / work	Award	Result
2018	Himself	Best Live Act	Won
2018	Himself	Best Afro-soul Artist/Group	Won
2016	Himself	Best Afro-soul Artist/Group	Won

=== Nyasa Music Awards ===
Year	Nominee / work	Award	Result
2018	Himself	Best Live Act	Won
2017	Mdidi	Best Single of the Year	Won

=== Malawi Special Achievers Award ===
Year	Nominee / work	Award	Result
2017	Himself	Best artist	Won

=== MAM Awards ===
Year	Nominee / work	Award	Result
2013	Himself	best song of the year	Won

=== Malawi National Awards ===
Year	Nominee / work	Award	Result
2004	Desperate	Best single	Won

=== Chirunga Awards ===
Year	Nominee / work	Award	Result
2004	Himself	Best Male Singer	Won

== Controversies ==
In January 2017, Mussa was reported refusing to perform at Christian Youth Association of Malawi symposium in South Africa where Prophet Shepherd Bushiri was the guest speaker.

In June 2020, Mussa faced heavy criticism for his new hair style that he had done as some claimed it did not befit a musician of that realm. The scenario began when Mussa posted a photo on Facebook that showed him in dreadlocks.
