= Chichiri Prison =

Prison in Malawi, Africa

Blantyre Central Prison
- Interactive map of Blantyre Central Prison
- Location: Blantyre, Malawi; 15°48′10″S 35°0′21″E
- Status: Operational
- Security class: Maximum (male and female)
- Capacity: 1,200
- Population: 2,400 (2026)
- Opened: 1901
- Managed by: Malawi Prison Service

Chichiri Prison, also known as Blantyre Central Prison, is a maximum-security prison located in Blantyre, Malawi.

== History ==
=== Formation ===
Blantyre Central Prison was established during the British colonial era, with the aim of detaining and rehabilitating offenders from the southern region of Malawi.

=== Capacity ===
The facility is designed for about 1,200, although it holds many more due to overcrowding. The prison population consists of male and female inmates, including those on remand and convicted prisoners.

In 2014 Médecins Sans Frontières established a base here and in Maula Prison with four staff at each location. In 2026 the number of inmates was about 2,400 and this was said to be double the capacity it was designed for. A senior officer made an appeal to the public to not discriminate against prisoners after they had served their sentence. The discrimination was thought to encourage re-offending.

== Attempts and escapes ==
In May 2022, three prisoners escaped from Chichiri Maximum Security Prison in Blantyre after digging a hole.

== Notable inmates ==
Blantyre Central Prison has held notable inmates. It has held drug dealers and Cashgate convict Oswald Lutepo. The prison has allowed entertainment. The singer Piksy performed here in 2018.

In 2021 Jana Gonani was sentenced to nine years for same-sex consensual sexual contact by magistrates in Mongochi. In 2022 she and the Nyasa Rainbow Alliance unsuccessfully appealed against the conviction arguing that it was unconstitutional. Gonani who is transsexual was sent to this male prison.
