= Public Affairs Committee (Malawi) =

- Formation: 1992; 34 years ago
- Type: NGO
- Location: Lilongwe
- Coordinates: 13.966°S 33.784°E
- Members: 36 (2012)

Public Affairs Committee (PAC) was founded in 1992 by the religious community and other pressure groups in Malaŵi to enter into a dialogue with Kamuzu Banda's Presidential Committee on Dialogue in the transition period from the one-party to the multiparty system of government in Malaŵi. Kenneth Ross's account of the transition, credits the PAC with a major role in the democratisation of Malaŵi.

== History ==
The referendum on multipartyism was settled in 1993 and the first multiparty elections were scheduled to take place in 1994, a number of pressure groups (notably the United Democratic Front and the Alliance for Democracy) split from PAC to form political parties to contest in the elections. PAC has since carried on as an umbrella organisation for the major faith communities represented in the country by the Muslim Association of Malawi, the Quadria Muslim Association of Malawi, the Malawi Council of Churches, the Evangelical Association of Malawi and the Episcopal Conference of Malawi.

The PAC is the national chapter of the World Conference on Religion and Peace (WCRP). The organisation’s mission statement is “to mobilise the general public through the religious community and other stakeholders in promoting democracy, development, peace and unity through civic education, mediation and advocacy”. The organisation has a national secretariat in Lilongwe, Malaŵi's capital city. Joseph Phiri was CEO in 2020, when the PAC received support from the Commonwealth Secretariat, together with the 50:50 campaign and the National Initiative for Civic Education (NICE) to support the national election.

In 2022 the PAC met with the President Lazarus Chakwera. Patrick Thawale, Chairperson of PAC Executive Committee, demanded that the President should reform his cabinet. Within days the cabinet was reformed notably excluding Minister of Lands, Kezzie Msukwa who was facing corruption charges from the Anti-Corruption Bureau.
