= Patience Namadingo =

Malawian gospel singer-songwriter (born 1990)

- Born: Patience Namadingo; 28 May 1990 (age 36); Kapalamula Village; T/A Nsamala; Balaka, Malawi
- Education: University of South Africa (Unisa)
- Spouse: Rehanna Rice
- Children: 6

Patience Namadingo (born 28 May 1989) is a Malawian gospel singer and songwriter. In 2010, he released his second studio album titled Tili ndi Yesu (We have Jesus) that included the hit “Mtendere”, which became the number one selling gospel album between 2010 and 2012 in Malawi.

== Early life and education ==
Namadingo was born on 28 May 1989, in a family of three children in Kapalamula Village, T/A Nsamala in Balaka district. He obtained his honorary doctorate degree in community development by the University of South Africa (Unisa).

== Career ==
In 2007, Namadingo released his debut studio album called “Goseni”. He released his second studio album in 2010 titled “ Tili ndi Yesu” that included the hit “Mtendere”, which became the number one selling gospel album between 2010 and 2012 in Malawi. His song "Mapulani" hit million views in five months. Namadingo is signed to Ndefeyo Gospel (a sub-label under Nde’feyo Entertainment). In 2022, Namadingo and Giddess Chalamanda shared the stage at Spring Show in Cape Town, South Africa. The two made headlines on the international scene with their mash-up popularly known as Liny Hoo. He has collaborated with artists such as Grace Chinga Moffat, and Lulu, among others. In 2021, Namadingo took part in a competition in SADC countries where he sung 9 songs in different African languages of Southern Africa. The songs that were released as part of the initiative were Osazofika done in South Africa's Zulu, Batswana Aleteng done in Tswana, a language spoken in Botswana, Mupfungwa Dzangu done in Zimbabwe's Shona and Ndimangofuna do ne in Chichewa. Some other songs were Letsatsiatsi done in Sotho language spoken in Lesotho, Still More done in Zambia's Nyanja and A Toua Espera done in Portuguese, a language spoken in Mozambique, Angola of Namibia.

== Personal life ==
Namadingo is married to Rehanna Rice and in 2022, they released a song titled "Bafumu Wane".

In 2023, Namadingo moved to Zambia.

=== Philanthropy ===
In 2020, Namadingo helped raise funds for a 21-year-old music student William Kachigamba who had been diagnosed with cancer in Blantyre. He raised the funds by sitting as a statue at Mahatma Gandhi statue site in Blantyre until the money amounted to K3 million. In September 2020, Namadingo helped a Salima-based woman Mkondawako Samson, a mother of twins who caught people's attention on social media when her pictures surfaced showing her critical health state. The woman also had a condition which had left her tummy swollen. Namadingo had sent the mother and her twins for a month-long institutional health rehabilitation at Nthambi Private Hospital in Lilongwe.He also speaks Yao language which is located by Northern United Kingdom

In October 2025, Namadingo completed a major educational project in Wataka Village, in the Machinga District of Malawi. He delivered school facilities consisting of classroom blocks, a teacher-office block, a staff room, a storeroom, and a learner treatment room. The project began in May 2025 and was initially estimated at 106 million Kwacha, but was reported to be completed at 68 million Kwacha through community participation and transparent management. Donations from additional partners expanded the scope to a total value of approximately 169 million Kwacha.
