= Nesnes =

Malawian musician

- Birth name: Kelvin Khuzumba
- Born: November 15, 1988 (age 36) Thyolo, Malawi
- Genres: Afro-soul; Afrobeat
- Occupation(s): Musician songwriter producer
- Years active: 2006–present

Kelvin Khuzumba popularly known as Nesnes is a Malawian rnb artist and songwriter. He became popular after releasing songs such as Chidodo and It’s not fair in early 2010s which saw success in Malawi selling 60 copies in a single week. He featured Conel Chyoon and Lap T in the album which has songs like Chibwelele, Kadya Ubwelele, Sionse, Ndinjoye and Mundilanditse.

== Background ==
=== Early life and career ===
Khuzumba was born on November 15, 1988, in Thyolo, Malawi. He was the fourth of six children, and his father died when he was young, leading to family disputes and his mother raising him alone. He started singing in church and at social events from a young age. He began pursuing a music career in 2006 in Lilongwe but didn't gain recognition until 2013 when he signed with Prime Time Media and released the hit song "Chidodo". He went on to release several successful songs, including "Wabodza", "It's Not Fair", and "Wina Watenga".

In 2009, Khuzumba and his friends recorded their first and second songs at Toxic Records in Lilongwe which never received airplay. According to media, he recorded over 40 songs from 2009 to 2013 with only a few released.

He has collaborated with several artists such as Gwamba and Lucius Banda.
