= Acidovorax citrulli =

Scientific classification
- Domain: Bacteria
- Kingdom: Pseudomonadati
- Phylum: Pseudomonadota
- Class: Betaproteobacteria
- Order: Burkholderiales
- Family: Comamonadaceae
- Genus: Acidovorax
- Species: A. citrulli

Binomial name
- Acidovorax citrulli Willems et al. 1992

Type strain
- NCPPB 1011 ATCC 19860

Strains
- A. citrulli Strain. M1 (Group I); A. citrulli Strain. M2 (Group I); A. citrulli Strain. M6 (Group I); A. citrulli Strain. W1 (Group II); A. citrulli Strain. W2 (Group II); A. citrulli Strain. 7a1 (Group II); A. citrulli Strain. W4 (Group II); A. citrulli Strain. W6 (Group II)

Synonyms
- Pseudomonas pseudoalcaligenes subsp. konjaci Pseudomonas pseudoalcaligenes subsp. citrulli Acidovorax avenae subsp. citrulli

Species of bacterium

Acidovorax citrulli (formerly A. avenae subsp. citrulli (Williems et al., 1992)) is a Gram-negative, biotrophic bacterium causes seedling blight and bacterial fruit blotch (BFB) of cucurbits. On the basis of carbon source utilization, DNA-fingerprinting profiles, whole-cell fatty-acid composition utilization and pathogenicity assays, A. citrulli is divided into two distinct groups (Walcott et al., 2004; Burdman et al., 2005; Bahar & Burdman, 2010). The group I strains are mainly associated with non-watermelon plants (mainly melon), while group II includes strains that were mainly isolated from watermelon.

BFB is a sporadic disease but under favorable environment, it becomes devastating and may cause 100% loss of marketable fruit. The destructive potential of this disease was realized after massive outbreaks in commercial lots at various eastern states of the United States during the late 80s. After the outbreak, this disease got much attention from the scientific community. Most efforts have been put on applied research, including improvement of diagnostics methods for A. citrulli detection in contaminated seeds, and screens for BFB resistance.
