= Jana Gonani =

Malawian LGBTQ rights activist

- Born: c.1994
- Occupation: sex worker
- Known for: trans-woman appealing her rights

Jana Gonani (born c. 1994) is a Malawian prisoner and LGBTQ rights activist. Gonani, who is a trans woman, was arrested in 2021 while working as a sex worker, and imprisoned on charges of "unnatural acts" and obtaining money by deception. She challenged her convictions based on Malawi's constitution, but lost her appeal in 2024. She was sent to Chichiri Prison, a men's prison in Blantyre, in line with the low level of LGBTQ rights in Malawi.

== Life ==
Gonani was born in about 1994.

=== Arrest and imprisonment ===
Gonani was working in Mangochi when she and others were apprehended by the police in September 2021. Another man claimed that he had understood that she was a woman and she had misrepresented herself to him and his friend. Gonani had sex with one of them. The male police officer forced her to have an examination where they determined that she had male genitalia. Gonani asserted that she was a trans woman, and the police sent her for a mental health assessment. She was sentenced to eight years in jail, which she began in December 2021. She was sent to Chichiri Prison in Blantyre.

==== Appeal and protests ====
Gonani was supported in her appeal by the Nyasa Rainbow Alliance in February 2022.

Protesters created placards lauding marriages between a man and a woman, in Blantyre, 13 July 2023

The case attracted multi-faith protests including the Malawi Council of Churches, because Malawi's laws were both controversial and unclear. A law proscribed against the order of nature without being more specific where as the constitution prevents discrimination against people because of "other status or condition". The court in Mangochi had assumed that until the high courts or parliament made their position clear then acts of homosexuality were illegal. Gonami was given two sentences of three years for deception and eight years for same-sex sex. The case was referred to a panel of high court judges.

In 2024, Gonani and Juan Wilem Akster, a Dutch national, took their case to court. They argued that the laws against homosexuality were unconstitutional. It was heard by a three judge panel of Judge Vikochi Chima, Justice Chimbizgani Kacheche and the chairperson was Justice Joseph Chigona. They rejected the case, noting that Gonani and Akster had failed to present any evidence that persuaded the judges that the law was unconstitutional.
