= Medicines for Malaria Venture =

Swiss non-profit organization

Medicines for Malaria Venture (MMV) is a not-for-profit public-private partnership that was established as a foundation in Switzerland in 1999 to reduce malaria in disease-endemic countries using antimalarial drugs.

== History ==
MMV was launched in 1999, with funding of US$4 million from the Government of Switzerland, the Department for International Development (UK), the Government of the Netherlands, the World Bank, and the Rockefeller Foundation. A founder and an initial key employee was Dr Robert Ridley who served at the chief Scientific Officer until 2001.

== Governance ==
MMV is governed by a board of directors. The Chairman in 2022 was Alan Court. MMV has a board of directors in North America, an Expert Scientific Advisory Committee which helps to identify projects, an Access & Product Management Advisory Committee and a Global Safety Board which reviews projects.

== Projects ==
MMV's project portfolio includes, drug-resistant strains of Plasmodium falciparum, safety for small children (less than 6 months old) and in pregnancy. It also includes Plasmodium vivax, severe malaria and transmission-blocking treatment. MMV publishes a pipeline showing the drugs and developments it is involved with.

=== Open Source Malaria ===
MMV started the Open Source Malaria project, which encourages people to share procedures and results of open source research. The Open Source Malaria, with researchers at the University of Sydney, supervised high school students at Sydney Grammar School who adapted a synthesis of Daraprim (pyrimethamine) using a less hazardous method in 2016.
