= Bertha Sefu =

Malawian civil servant

- Education: University of Derby
- Employer(s): Malawi Council of Churches, Malawi Human Rights Commission

Bertha Sefu is a Malawian former administrator who was employed by the Malawi Council of Churches in 2007. Malawi's High Court ruled that she was unfairly dismissed. She later served as a Human Rights Commissioner from 2015.

== Life ==
Sefu had a Masters degree in Strategic Management from the University of Derby.

In 1999 Sefu was employed by the Malawi Council of Churches as their Gender and Social Coordinator. She was suspended on 23 July 2007 pending an investigation. In 2009 the investigation had not been made and she had not been paid her full salary. The Industrial Tribunal court case was appealed and settled in 2018 by Malawi's High Court. Sefu was judged, on appeal, to have been constructively dismissed and it was said that her employers had unreasonably withheld her salary. The Malawi Legal Information Institute records her case noting that "Prolonged unpaid suspension can amount to constructive dismissal, entitling the employee to severance, notice pay and interest".

In 2015, she and Baldwin Chiyamwaka were appointed by the President to be a Malawi Human Rights Commissioner after she had been nominated. She was to serve for three years. The commission was reformed. Three of the previous commissioners had completed their terms. The President also reappointed four commissions for a second term of three more years.

The Wash International Trust in Malawi supports clean water supply. Sefu served as vice-chair of their Board of Trustees. Sefu, as a Human Rights Commissioner, had previously called for the prosecution of water board officials who had supplied contaminated water in Lilongwe.

In 2020 she was part of the Commission's Public inquiry on Justice Delivery on Violence against Women and Girls in the Formal and Informal Justice System. She spoke of her concern at a school in Karonga. She complained that the system wasn't working - women who complained about abuse had their cases laughed at by the police and they were then sent back to the same home and husband. High Court Judge Justice Fiona Mwale was also at the school and she believed that a major issue was the physical distance between abusers and the court system. Victims and the accused had to travel large distances and this made it difficult for witnesses to give evidence.
