= Kell Kay =

Malawian singer based in Lilongwe

- Born: Kell Kay Kambwiri; May 20, 1993 (age 32); Likuni Mission Hospital; Lilongwe, Malawi
- Genres: R&B; Afrobeat; Afropop; Afro Soul
- Occupations: Musician songwriter
- Years active: 2006–present

Kelvin Kambwiri (born May 20, 1993), best known as Kell Kay, is a Malawian RnB artist and songwriter. He was born and raised in Lilongwe,Malawi. In 2017 and 2018, he won a Nyasa Music Award as Best R&B Artist of the year. His collaboration with Gwamba titled Mr yesu was nominated as the Best collaboration of the year 2018.

== Background ==
=== Early life ===
Kambwiri was born on 20 May 1993, in Lilongwe in a family of 4 children. He did his college studies at Malawi Adventist University.

=== Music career ===
Kambwiri released his first album titled “Part of Your Life,” in 2008 which was produced at Toxic Records. It wasn't until 2014 that Kambwiri gained national recognition with his hit song, “Ndilore Ndipite,” (Let me go) which earned him a spot in the mainstream industry.

He got more audience when he was featured by Martse in the award-winning song “Mwano” (rudeness). The song won various awards that year, cementing Kambwiri's position as a rising star in the Malawian music industry.

In 2019, Kambwiri released his studio album titled “Love After 24” at the Bingu International Convention Centre, where he proposed to his longtime girlfriend, Tammie, in front of a live audience.
