= Hilco (musician) =

Malawian singer

Hilda Ulola
- Born: 14 February 1995 (age 30); Phalombe, Malawi
- Genres: Afrobeat; Afro Pop; RnB
- Occupation(s): Musician songwriter
- Years active: 2009–present

Hilda Ulola (born 14 February 1995) professionally known as Hilco, is a Malawian Afro-Pop singer, songwriter and philanthropist. In 2017, she was nominated in the category "Best Afro Pop Artist of the Year" and "Best Female Artist of the Year" in 2018 in the Nyasa Music Awards. In 2019, she was nominated as "Best Female Artist of the Year" in the UMP Awards.

She has been involved in several charity projects, including supporting education for underprivileged children.

== Background ==
=== Early life ===
Ulola was born on 14 February 1995, in Blantyre, Malawi's commercial city, in a family of six children. She attended her primary education in Blantyre as well as her secondary school at Blantyre Girls Secondary School. She developed a passion for music at a young age and started performing in school choirs and talent shows.

=== Musical career ===
Ulola started her music career in 2015, releasing her debut single "Ekizakitile." She gained popularity with her subsequent releases, including "Chekecheke (I swear)," "Ndalema (I am tired)," and "Khofotabo (Comfortable)." In 2016, she was signed to Alex Entertainment, which helped her produce more music and collaborate with other artists.

Ulola has released several successful singles, including "Wanga (Mine)" featuring Saint, "Usanapite (Before you go)" featuring Dan Lu, and "Undikwatile (Marry me)." Her music genre is a fusion of Afrobeat, RnB, and Pop.

== Accolades ==
Ulola has been nominated for several awards, including the Malawi Music Awards, Nyasa Music Awards, UMP Awards and the African Music Awards. She has won awards for Best Female Artist and Best Newcomer in the Malawi music industry.

=== Nyasa Music Awards ===
Year	Nominee / work	Award	Result
2017	Herself	Best Afro Pop Artist of the Year	Nominated
2018	Herself	Best Female Artist of the Year	Nominated

=== UMP Awards ===
Year	Nominee / work	Award	Result
2019	Herself	Best Female Artist of the Year	Nominated

== Personal life ==
It was rumored that Ulola was dating artist Saint and Young D, but the artist denied the accusations.
