= Giddess Chalamanda =

Malawian singer (born 1931)

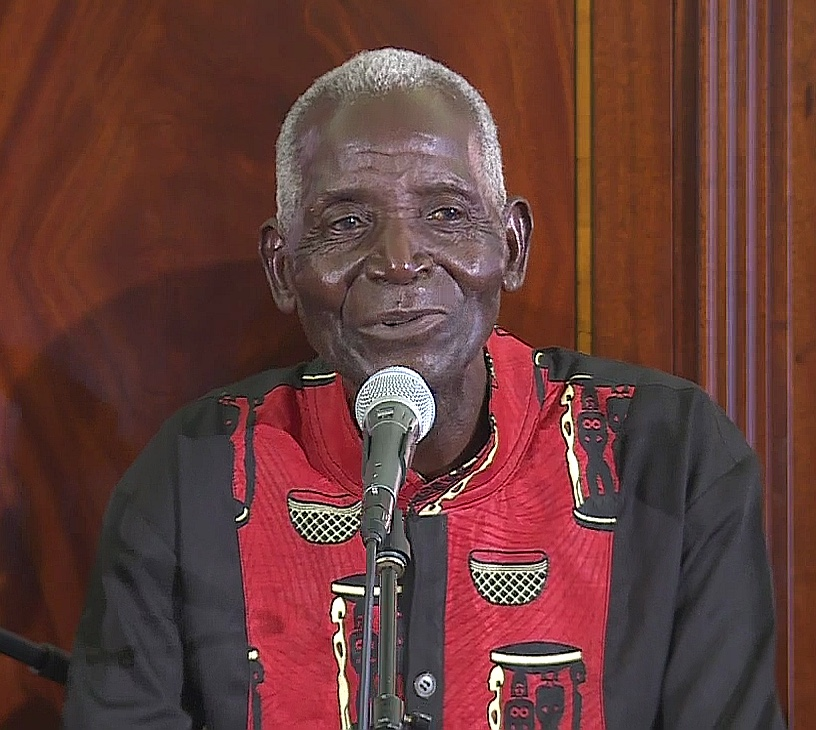
- playing at the Library of Congress in Washington D.C.
- Born: Gidesi Chalamanda; 15 January 1931 (age 95); Chiradzulu, Malawi
- Occupation: Musician
- Spouse: Abiti Alfred
- Children: Linny

Gidesi Chalamanda (born 15 January 1931) and most commonly known as Agide, is a Malawian acoustic artist. He was born in Chiradzulu in the Southern region of Malawi.

He is one of Malawi's legendary artists. His song "linny", a mashup with Dr Namadingo, trended on TikTok gaining over a million views. In November 2022 he received a lifetime achievement award from Maso Awards.

== 2016 Coming To America tour ==
In the lyrics to his song "Buffalo soldier", he mentions that if he had enough money he would travel to America. In 2016, with the help of fans, friends and Malawian organizations both in Malawi and in the Malawian Diaspora, he was able to achieve this dream when he traveled to the US with musicians Davis ndi Edgar. He held a concert at the Black Rock Center for the Arts in the "Pulse of Malawi" concert which celebrated Malawian independence day in Germantown MD. He was a panelist at the panel discussions held by the Malawian Diaspora organizations. He also played at the Library of Congress in Washington D.C. where his music was archived. He also held a concert at the state theater in Indiana, a state mentioned in his original song.

== 2020 collaboration with Namadingo ==
In July 2020, Chalamanda collaborated with Malawian local artiste Patience Namadingo who was the brand ambassador of Malawian private bank FDH Financial Holdings and together made a remix of a number of his hit songs including "Linnyhoo", "Buffalo Soldier", and "Che meri". In the remix video, Chalamanda is seen providing amazing bass vocals with Namadingo weaving his voice together with his, producing a hit song that has made rounds on social media platforms like TikTok. In the same month, FDH promised to build Chalamanda a grocery store in his local town of Chiradzulu. The promise was fulfilled in September of the same year when the bank handed over a well constructed and fully stocked grocery store, thereby providing Chalamanda with a reliable source of income to facilitate his retirement from music.
