= Shishani Vranckx =

Namibian-Belgian jazz singer, songwriter

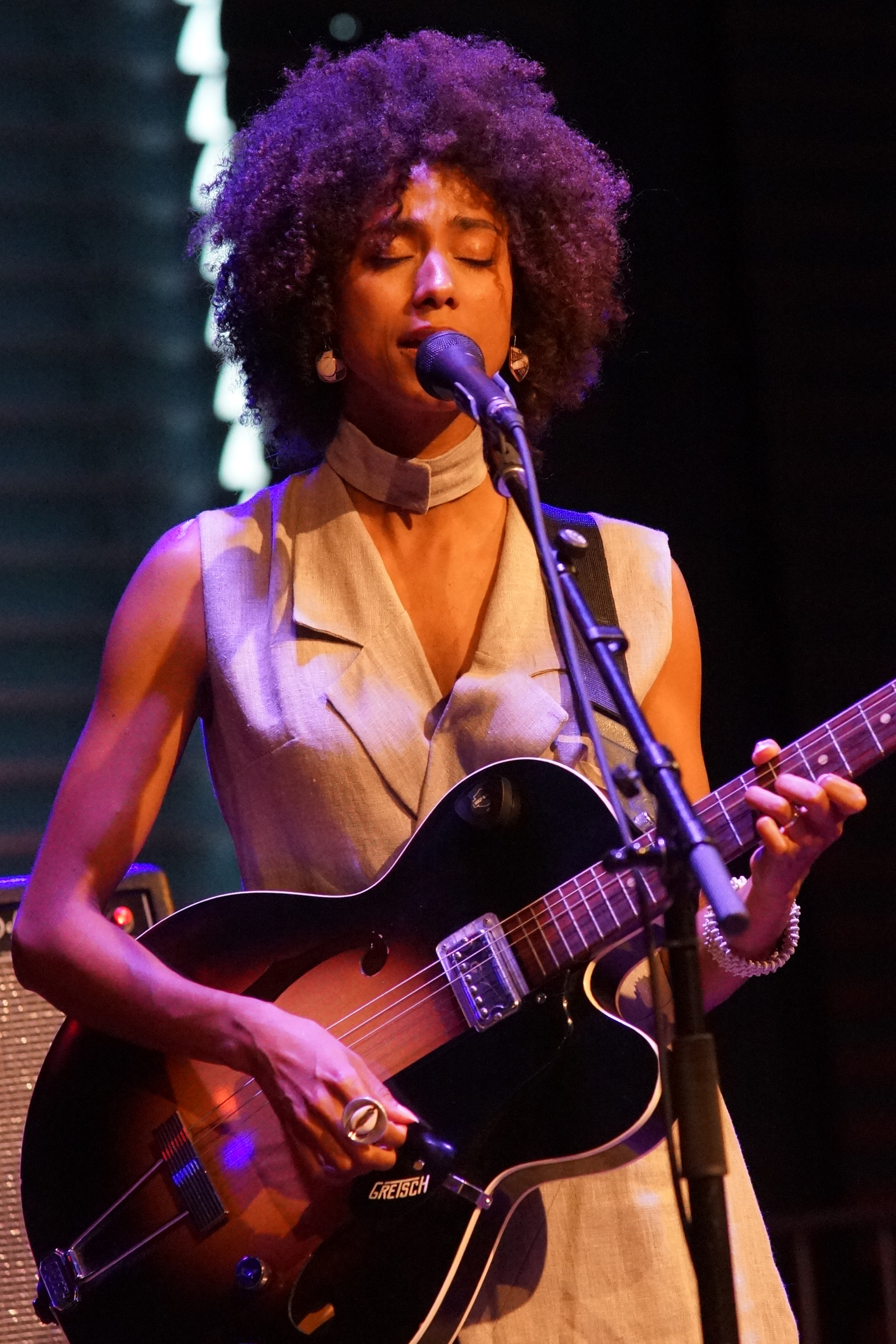
- Born: December 7, 1987 (age 38); Windhoek
- Other name: Shishani
- Education: Leiden University
- Occupations: singer, guitarist and composer
- Website: Shishani.nl

Shishani Vranckx also simply as Shishani (born December 7, 1987) is a Belgium-Namibian jazz singer, songwriter, guitarist, and cultural anthropologist. Their band "Namibian Tales" includes San music influences.

== Life ==
Vranckx was born in 1987 in the Namibian capital of Windhoek. Their elder brother Ernst Vranckx is also a musician. Their heritage is Belgian and Namibian although Shishani spent much of their childhood in the Netherlands, but they always wanted to learn about/investigate their maternal heritage from their Ndonga mother. Shishani took their first degree in anthropology at Leiden University and then went on to a master's degree in musicology.

From 2012- 2013, Shishani competed in band competitions in both Belgium and Namibia. In 2014, they were a finalist in the Radio France International Discovery Award competition.

In 2015, Shishani and Shahin During formed a musical group called The Namibian Tales to play the music of Namibia. The pair were joined by Debby Korfmacher and Bence Huszar from Germany and Hungary, becoming a quartet. The quartet's debut album Itaala was released in 2016 and it was recognised as a "Best World Music Album" in the Netherlands by Mixed World Music. Writing the songs had been difficult because of their eclectic background. The final sound included Namibian music, Huszar's cello, and the work they had done with San musicians. Vranckx worked with the San people as an anthropologist - they are one of the oldest surviving cultures.

In 2017, they won again, this time for their second album Kalahari Encounters.

In 2019, they formed a new band which they named Miss Catharsis, and this new group excluded any white or male musicians. The Dutch presenter Jan Douwe Kroeske introduced a live session of Miss Catharsis in June 2022.

In 2024, they were in Namibia where Shishani and others had put together work based around a drum from Museum am Rothenbaum in Hamburg. The work finished with an all-night show at the Goethe-Institut in Windhoek.

== Personal life ==
Shishani identifies themself as a black queer non-binary person.
