= General Kanene =

Zambian musician

- Born: Clifford Dimba; February 23, 1980 (age 45); Lusaka, Zambia
- Genres: Afrobeat
- Occupations: Musician songwriter producer
- Years active: 2000–present

Clifford Dimba, best known as General Kanene, is a Zambian musician, singer, songwriter and producer. He has won several awards, including the Zambia Music Award for Best Male Artist and the African Music Award for Best Traditional Artist. He has also been nominated for several other awards, including the MTV Africa Music Awards.

In 2014, he was found guilty of raping a 14-year-old girl and was sentenced to 18 years in prison. He was pardoned by president Edgar Lungu after a year, and was subsequently appointed as an ambassador in the fight against gender-based violence in Zambia. He was removed from his post after he was criminally charged for gender-based violence again.

== Background ==
=== Early life ===
Dimba was born in Lusaka, Zambia on February 23, 1980. From childhood, he was immersed in music courtesy of his musical family. He did his junior studies at Libala Primary School while at the same time completing his secondary education in the same institution.

=== Music career ===
Dimba started his music career in the early 2000s, performing at local shows and events. He gained popularity with his unique style, blending traditional Zambian music with modern genres such as hip-hop and R&B. He has released several albums, including "Mukazi" and "Kanene". Apart from music, Dimba has worked as a radio presenter and event organizer.

== Legal history ==
In 2014, Dimba was arrested and charged with aggravated robbery. He was later acquitted of all charges.

In 2015, Dimba was charged with assaulting a woman, despite his appointment as an ambassador against gender violence. This came after he was released from prison, where he served a year of his 18-year sentence for sexually assaulting a 14-year-old girl. President Edgar Lungu had granted him a presidential pardon, controversially appointing him as an ambassador for women and children's rights, sparking widespread criticism. Dimba's charges raised further questions about his suitability for the role and his commitment to promoting gender equality. Just four days after his release from prison, Zambian media outlets reported that Dimba had physically assaulted his wife. Graphic photographs of his wife's severely swollen face were published in various Zambian newspapers, although she ultimately chose not to press charges against him. In October, Dimba was apprehended and formally charged with assaulting another woman at a public tavern. He was subsequently released on bail.
