= Piksy =

Malawian musician

- Born: Evans Zangazanga; June 9, 1986 (age 40); Blantyre, Malawi
- Genres: Afro-soul; Afrobeat
- Occupations: Musician songwriter producer
- Years active: 2002–present

Evans Zangazanga, popularly known as Piksy is a Malawian musician. In 2015, he was nominated for the Best Male Southern Africa category in Kora Awards. He was the Brand Ambassador for Airtel for over 2 years commencing on 1 August 2012 and through 30 November 2015.

He has worked with several organisations such as National Youth Council, PSI Malawi, Health Policy Project with the USAID, NFPA and YONECO Malawi to support advocacy programmes as well as to compose and produce theme songs.

== Background ==
=== Early life ===
Zangazanga was born on 9 June, 1986 in Blantyre. He started his career in 2004 while still at secondary school and made his mark in 2008 with his hit Pantima (Sendeza) which he featured Nthumwi Nicodemus. Zangazanga was in a music group called Atumwi. His first studio album titled "Atumwi" had hit songs such as Zatheka, Pamudzi, Moseliwa, Chipwirikiti and Mzanga.

Zangazanga has shared the stage with both local and international artists. In 2018 he performed in Chichiri Prison in Blantyre.

== See also ==
- Suffix
- Dan Lu
- Sangie
