= Eric Sambisa =

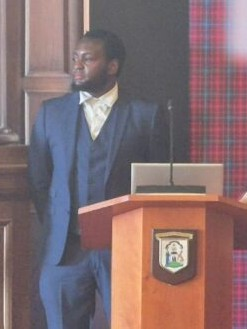
- Born: 1990 (age 35–36)
- Citizenship: Malawian
- Occupation: LGBTQI+ Activist
- Organization: Nyasa Rainbow Alliance
- Known for: First Malawian to publicly come out on a national television.
- Website: https://nra-mw.com/about/

Eric Sambisa is a Malawian LGBTI human rights activist and the director of the Nyasa Rainbow Alliance. In 2016, he became the first openly gay Malawian to publicly come out on national television.

== LGBTQI Activism ==
Eric Sambisa is a Malawian LGBTI human rights activist. He publicly came out on national television in 2016 and was subsequently arrested by police in Malawi. He was quoted in the media as saying, "Kill Us Or Give Us Our Rights". After his release from prison, he went into hiding.

In 2017, Sambisa co-founded the Nyasa Rainbow Alliance (NRA), an organisation that advocates for LGBTQI+ people in Malawi to live safely, openly, and with dignity. The same year, Sambisa and his NRA colleague Sulom Mtongolo filled for judicial review after the Malawian government refused to register the organisation, and the High Court in Blantyre granted the application. Through his work with the NRA, Sambisa has received several awards, including the Human Rights Defender at Risk Award in 2019.

Sambisa has focused on improving the visibility of and advancing equal rights for LGBTI people in Malawi. Under his leadership, the NRA organised Malawi's first pride parade in 2021. Male same-sex sexual activity is punishable in Malawi by up to 14 years' imprisonment, while female same-sex sexual activity is punishable by up to five years. Sambisa has also been a prominent advocate for the decriminalisation of same-sex relationships in Malawi.

In 2020, Sambisa was arrested and detained in South Africa on allegations that he did not have a valid visa to remain in the country. He was subsequently acquitted of the charges. In 2022, the Nyasa Rainbow Alliance unsuccessfully supported an appeal by transgender woman Jana Gonani against convictions involving "unnatural acts", challenging the constitutionality of the relevant laws.

In 2026, Sambisa was a Human Rights Defender Fellow at Dundee University. During the fellowship, he spoke at Scotland's Human Rights Conference and at a meeting organised by the Scotland Malawi Partnership.
