= Bacterial fruit blotch =

Bacterial plant disease

- Common names: BFB
- Causal agents: Acidovorax citrulli
- Hosts: Cucurbitaceae (melon and watermelon)
- EPPO Code: PSDMAC

Bacterial fruit blotch (BFB) affects cucurbit plants around the world and can be a serious threat to farmers because it spreads through contaminated seed. BFB is the result of an infection by Gram-negative Acidovorax citrulli bacteria, which has only been recently studied in detail. Members of A. citrulli are Gram-negative rod shaped bacteria with the dimensions 0.5× 1.7 μm. They move via polar flagella. No known reliable sources of BFB resistance exist today, so seed hygiene and thorough testing of breeding facilities are the best way to control spreading. No known control methods, however, are extremely reliable for reducing BFB infection.

== Hosts and symptoms ==
A. citrulli causes disease in the family Cucurbitaceae, with the most significant losses in melon and watermelon. It also affects pumpkin, zucchini and cucumber but these are not as economically devastated by fruit blotch as the melons. A. citrulli’s economic hosts are cucurbits, but the bacteria can also infect volunteer seedlings of other families. This makes it easier for the pathogen to spread. Symptoms of melon with BFB include water soaked lesions on cotyledons, and hypocotyls, leading to collapse and death. Lesions will look necrotic and may be near veins. On fruit, water soaked lesions will be small and irregular (they average 1 cm diameter and may be sunken) but then progress through the rind. The fruit then decays and cracks when the pathogen causes necrosis. These lesions open the plant to secondary infections as well. A. citrulli then colonizes the pulp, eventually allowing the seed to become contaminated. On adult leaves, the symptoms appear the same as the ones left by other abiotic or biotic stressors so diagnosis is not as straight forward. They include large irregular leaf lesions which are brown to black in watermelon and reddish brown in melon. Bacterial fruit blotch lesions spread along main midrib in adult leaves.

== Disease cycle ==
Acidivorax citrulli is primarily seed transmitted. Seeds containing A. citrulli are difficult to treat, as the bacteria is found deep within the tissue, and can be viable for 35 years or more. There are still some aspects of the epidemiology that are unknown. It has been found that the pathogen initially starts its life as a saprophyte, relying on the seed's degrading action of complex sugars, and switches to a pathogenic growth mode when the seedling emerges. While this is a step forward, there is little knowledge of the pathogen's movement in the plant, how it overwinters, or its alternate hosts. Without this knowledge, its complete mode of reproduction (an important tool in reducing epidemic) is still unknown.

The infection of fruit is better understood. Bacteria typically enter the fruit through their stomata, three to four weeks after fruit set. As the fruit develops, wax fills and blocks stomata, eliminating entry to the bacteria. While the maturation of fruit restricts entry to the bacteria, mature fruits are more susceptible to symptoms of the bacteria than immature fruit. Fruit typically show symptoms in the final weeks of development, leaving a lag period between infection and symptoms. The fruit typically becomes infected early in development, and shows symptoms near harvest, making diagnosis and prevention difficult. The only known way for the bacteria to get into production fields is by introduction of infected seeds. This makes sanitation highly important.

== Environment ==
A. citrulli’s ability to infect hosts depends on environmental factors. It relies on temperature and humidity to thrive. High temperatures and humidity, plus high levels of bacteria on/within the seed are required to see infection. The amount of bacteria on/within seed is based on the intensity of fruit infection in the previous season (the seed is infected when the fruit tissue surrounding it transmits the bacteria). Greenhouses are perfect environments for seed to seedling transfer of A. citrulli because it is warm, humid, and tightly filled with host plants. For this reason, many transplants are infected before they are transplanted to the field. When direct seeded, cucurbits may have a better chance for survival because the environment in the field is more variable and may be cooler/drier than the greenhouse. This makes it more difficult for the pathogen to infect.

== Management ==
If seed is to be transported from country to country, it generally needs to be free of pathogens before the company will accept it. Japan legally restricts the admission of seeds carrying Acidivorax citrulli bacteria. Seed can be cleaned using a dry heat treatment to remove the pathogen with some success. A treatment of 85° for 3–5 days is effective for removing the pathogen. Different cucurbit seeds respond to this treatment in different ways, and some species (large-seeded squash, wax gourd, bottle gourd) have reduced germination following a dry heat treatment. This cleaning method can remove other pathogens found within seeds, but has been found to be especially useful for BFB. Prior to planting, seed should be checked to ensure that it is not infected with BFB. Companies such as Eurofins STA Laboratories and Summit Plant Labs test seed for cleanliness.

Since the pathogen is difficult to eradicate, plant resistance to the pathogen can provide an alternative to removing the pathogen. While research is being carried out to produce cultivars that are resistant, progress has not been quick. Several accessions have been reported to have resistance to BFB in watermelon and melon, but are not widely accepted to date. While these advances are promising, there are still no commercial cultivars with significant resistance to BFB.

== Importance ==
The first plant pathogenic bacteria was determined in 1878 and many more have been identified since. However, research on Bacterial Fruit Blotch began much later than many other plant diseases. It was not until the 1980s that the disease began to impact the fruit industry economically. Since the discovery of BFB, millions of dollars have been lost to crop rot, however no exact dollar amount has been identified. The first report of BFB research came in 1965 when a seed-borne phytobacterium was isolated from diseased plant tissue from Turkey. The USDA originally thought the disease was exclusively in seedlings, however the first BFB outbreak in 1987 proved that entire fields could be lost to fruit decay. Today, many outbreaks in the United States result in 90-100% fruit loss per diseased field, prompting lawsuits by farmers over contaminated seed. In the 1990s, A. citrulli was found to infect most other cucurbit species. During this time, Bacterial Fruit Blotch spread through cucurbit fields around the globe very quickly. It appears to spread only through contaminated seed, however non-economic host plants can carry the disease on seed as well, making it difficult to control. BFB is a unique disease because its late discovery gives scientists an opportunity to track the outbreak from the start. Like all plant diseases, the BFB epidemic is related to the interactions of a triangle of disease components (Pathogen, Host, and Environment). Therefore, BFB provides an opportunity to better understand how to track these interactions in real time while this disease spreads.
