= Blood for Blood (disambiguation) =

Blood for Blood is an American hardcore punk band.

Blood for Blood may also refer to:

- Blood for Blood (Aria album) or Krov za krov
- Blood for Blood (Hellyeah album)
- Blood for Blood (1935 film) or Khoon Ka Khoon, a 1935 Indian Hindi-Urdu language film by Sohrab Modi
- Khoon Ka Badla Khoon (transl. Blood for Blood), a 1978 Indian Hindi-language film
- Blood for Blood (1995 film) or Midnight Man
