= Microloan Foundation =

British charity active in Southern Africa

MicroLoan Foundation is a UK-based microfinance charity that gives small loans and business training to women in Malawi, Zimbabwe and Zambia. The main objectives of the organisation is poverty alleviation and gender empowerment, and consequently its main focus has been on the women living in the rural areas, who make up majority of the poor in Sub-Saharan Africa. In 2022 alone, MicroLoan supported over 160,000 women to grow businesses. With these loans and free business and financial literacy training, the women are able to start businesses thereby increasing their household incomes, business profits and assets. They are able to make savings to support them during future hardship. The women are also able to pay for their children to attend school, pay for medical care and make their families more food secure. Much of the training is delivered in song, dance and role-play because of low literacy rates.

== History of MicroLoan ==
MicroLoan Foundation (MLF) was founded in the late 1990s by Peter Ryan. During a visit to Malawi in 1997, Peter was astounded by the level of poverty in the country and the disparity between the rich and the poor. He recognised a need for extending financial services to the poor in Sub-Sarahan Africa, for whom these services are usually almost impossible to access due to the remoteness of the areas and the clients lack of collateral to secure the loans. These clients are also hindered by their lack of education and business training. With his experience in starting small businesses in Chiswick, Peter started the organisation in Malawi and since then operations have grown and MicroLoan now serves women across Malawi, Zambia and Zimbabwe.

== How it works ==
Loan Officers ride out to the rural areas on motorcycles or bikes to reach even the most remote communities. Those who are interested are then encouraged to form groups of between 5-20 members. The Loan Officers provide business and financial literacy training before the first loan is dispensed. Loans average about £62, but can be as small as £12. These loans are charged a service-charge and are not entirely free. Repayments are recycled and reused to make more loans.

The training offered includes business training; how to make a business plan, marketing etc. It also aims to encourage group support and cohesion in the group. This training is participatory and takes into account the fact that two-thirds of its clients have little or no schooling. These training sessions continue to ensure the success of their businesses.

The clients are encouraged to build up capital reserves and increase their economic independence. The amount of savings also determines their loan sizes.

This approach has been successful and has led to a high repayment level of 98%, with low drop out rates.

== Pro-Poor Pilot Programme ==
In May 2015, MLF made a commitment to meet the poorest in society; those living on less than $1.25 a day by the end of 2016. This will involve rolling out a pilot programme to 2,700 clients in two branches in Malawi and Zambia. MLF joins 51 other microfinance organisations that have done the same under the Microcredit Summit Campaign. These pilot programme involves changes to how loans are disbursed, increased support to vulnerable clients and access to savings for emergencies. These changes will hopefully help address some of the concerns in the microfinance arena, that microcredit does not always reach the poorest in society.

== BBC Lifeline Appeal ==
On 17 May 2015, MLF was featured in the BBC Lifeline Appeal, a monthly charity appeal that highlights the works of different charities. The organisation's work was presented by Business Leader and Microfinance Advocate, Deborah Meaden.

== See also ==
- Microfinance
