= Jetu =

Malawian musician and comedian

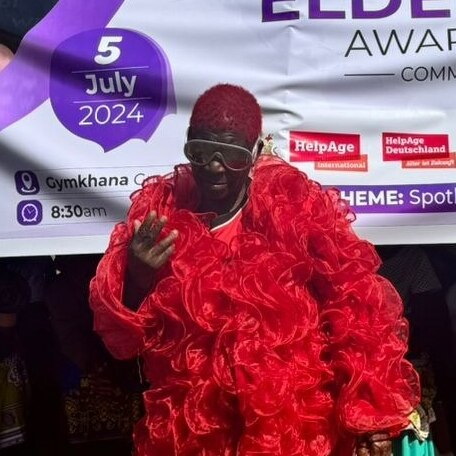
- Born: 1952 (age 73–74)

Christina Malaya (born 1951 or 1952) is a Malawian musician and comedian. She is better known by the name Jetu, in reference to boxing legend King Kong King Marshal Jetu. Her brother gave her the nickname as a child, because she often fought her classmates. Jetu sued COSOMA for not supporting her music.

== Career ==
Jetu became interested in drama and comedy at a young age. After her husband died in 2019, her interest in doing comedy was reinvigorated. She has also since become a musician. Jetu posts videos to TikTok and YouTube.

== Personal life ==
Following her husband's death in 2019, Jetu moved to from Mchinji to Blantyre to live with her grandchildren.
