= World Lion Day =

Annual event on August 10 for the awareness of lion conservation

- Observed by: International
- Date: 10 August
- Next time: 10 August 2026
- Frequency: Annual

World Lion Day is an international annual event on August 10, dedicated to raising awareness and support for the conservation of lions. Conceived by conservationists Rae Kokeš and David Youldon, then both working for the conservation charity The African Lion & Environmental Research Trust (ALERT), with the launch event taking place in Livingstone, Zambia on August 10, 2013. Since that time, World Lion Day is now recognized by many wildlife organizations and celebrated annually across the globe.

== Mission ==
World Lion Day was conceived to create awareness of the conservation needs of lions, and to promote engagement with organizations undertaking conservation efforts for lions via fundraising events, donations and other means of support. Lions are listed as "Vulnerable" on the IUCN Red List. of threatened species, with a decreasing population of 23,000 mature individuals and a decline in the species' range of 36% over three generations.

== History ==
The first World Lion Day event was held on August 10, 2013. Since then it has been celebrated annually around the world through art, photography and cultural events with conservation and media organizations promoting events to support lion conservation efforts.

== Issues ==
The principal threats to lion populations include: habitat loss, indiscriminate killing (primarily in response to human-lion conflict), prey base depletion and poaching for parts.

== See also ==
- List of environmental dates
