= Sangie =

Malawian reggae artist

- Born: Angel Mbekeani; Blantyre, Malawi
- Other name: SangieYuhKnow
- Occupations: Singer; songwriter; rapper; dancer
- Years active: 2002–present
- Works: Sangie discography; Discography; production; videography
- Children: 2
- Awards: Full list
- Musical career
- Genres: Reggae; R&B; hip hop; pop
- Instrument: Vocals
- Label: Mikozi

Angel Mbekeani, best known as Sangie, is a Malawian reggae singer and songwriter. In 2015, she won as the best female artist of the year in UMP Awards. In 2016 and 2019, she was nominated in the same awards in Best Female Artist of the Year. In 2017, she won in the same awards in Best Female Act.

In 2018, she was nominated as the best reggae artist, best female artist and her album titled 'painless' was nominated as the album of the year in Nyasa Music Awards.

Mbekeani is a UNICEF Champion For Children in Malawi and is the first Malawian female artist to be an ambassador for UNICEF as well as the second musician to take the role in the country after rapper Fredokiss.

== Background ==
=== Early life ===
Mbekeani was born in Ndirande, Blantyre and raised in Lilongwe. She completed her primary school in Blantyre as well as her secondary school education.

=== Music career ===
Mbekeani started her music career by singing in a church choir in early 2000s. She came to the spotlight in 2014 when she recorded her first single. Mbekeani has been active in various campaigns against gender based violence against women and young girls.

On 17 August, she performed at SADC summit with several different artists.

In 2017, she released the video of the song titled 'Mkazi Wangwiro' (The Good wife) which saw many sales and downloads within a single week. The music video also received attention from different politicians such as Patricia Kaliati.

In 2018, Mbekeani shared a stage with prolific Malawian artists such as Dan Lu and Fredokiss during Carlsberg Urban Music Legacy in Malawi. On 14 July 2020, Mbekeani and Piksy worked together on their Extended Play.

On 3 January 2022, she collaborated with a Malawian fiction writer, communications specialist, and journalist, Dyson Mthawanji, in his debut hit single titled 'tiye' (lets go).

== Personal life ==
Mbekeani is reported to have been in relationship with dancehall artist, Malinga Mafia.

== Achievements ==
=== UMP Awards ===
Year	Nominee / work	Award	Result
2019	Herself	Female Artist of the Year	Nominated
2020	Herself	Female Artist of the Year	Nominated
2017	Herself	Best Female Act	Won
2015	Herself	Best Female Artist of the Year	Won

=== Nyasa Music Awards ===
Year	Nominee / work	Award	Result
2018	painless	Album of the Year	Nominated
2018	Herself	Best Female Artist of the Year	Nominated
2018	Herself	Best Reggae Artist	Nominated
