= Lake of Stars Festival =

Music festival in Malawi

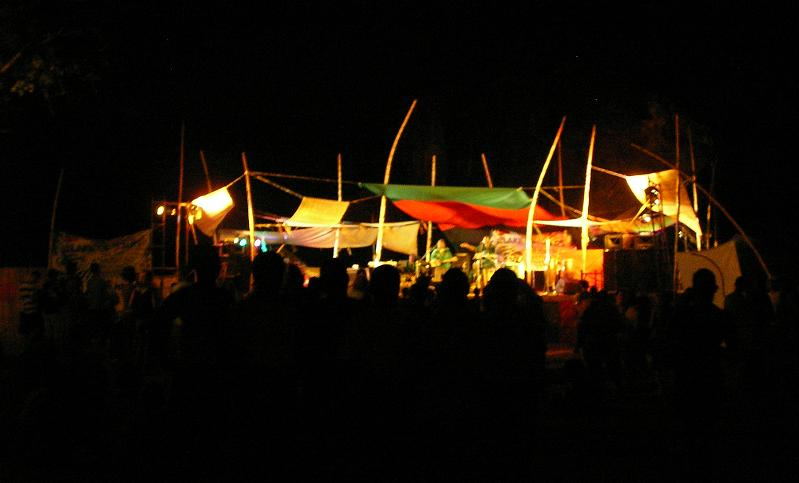
- Main stage after sundown at the Lake of Stars 2008 music festival on the shores of Lake Malawi
- Genre: Festival
- Dates: 6–08 September
- Frequency: Annually
- Location: Lake Malawi
- Country: Malawi
- Years active: 20 years
- Inaugurated: 2004
- Founder: Founder Will Jameson
- Previous event: 2024
- Next event: 2025
- Attendance: 3,000
- Area: UK, Europe, USA, Africa and Malawi
- Organiser: Dusty Orange Projects ET Al (DOPE Malawi)
- Website: lakeofstars.org

Lake of Stars Festival is an annual three-day international festival held on the shores of Lake Malawi, the third largest lake in Africa. The first festival took place in 2004 and attracts over 4,000 attendees with musical acts mainly from Africa and Europe.

== History ==
The festival was founded by British tourist Will Jameson. Jameson visited Malawi in 1998. He was a student at John Moores University and took a year off to work with The Wildlife Society. That work sent him to Malawi. Upon returning to college, Jameson started night club as tribute to his trip, called Chibuku Shake Shake, the name of a brand of Malawian beer. The club night was named the best club night in the United Kingdom 2004 by Mixmag. That same year, Jameson held the first festival. An estimated 700 people attended, the majority from Africa. The 2011 Lake of Stars attracted over 3,000 attendees from Europe and Africa. The festival was opened with the Malawian ministry of tourism skydiving onto the festival beach. The festival has inspired many other activities in film and festival production, produced by a Malawian lead team, Dusty Orange Projects Et Al, (DOPE).

== Media and accolades ==
Lake of Stars Festival is widely referenced as being one of the most important festivals on the African continent. In 2014, it was named one of the top seven African music festivals to attend by CNN. Time Out named Lake of Stars as having the most beautiful festival location in the world, in 2015. The UK's Independent newspaper has said "the life-affirming Lake of Stars offers a fascinating opportunity to experience the musical pulse of this inspiring country". In 2016, Vice Magazine recognised that "the ability of this festival to inspire the young people who attend is pretty special"

== Festival management ==
The Lake of Stars Festival is organised by a mixture of international volunteers, many of them with huge amounts of experience in the live events industry, supporting a team in Malawi. The festival receives pro-bono support from the UK music industry, with the UK headliners that travel to Malawi usually agreeing to waive their normal performance fees. An estimated over $1 million in 2011 was generated by the festival for the local economy. In 2024 the British High Commissioner Fiona Ritchie arranged for sponsorship from the UK Government. The UK would cover some travelling expenses from the UK and fund a parallel event in Malawian secondary schools. Ritchie supported the event because of its contribution to "peace and unity".

== Activities ==
The festival organizes volunteer opportunities for festival attendees, providing service to a variety of charities sponsored by the festival including the Microloan Foundation. Attendees also visit orphanages to spend time with children and play games and sports with them. The festival also includes talks, similar to TED talks, theatre, dance and mixed martial arts.

== Performers ==
A wide swath of international performers play at Lake of Stars, many from Africa, Europe and the United Kingdom. These artists include, but are not limited to:

- Afrikan Boy
- Foals
- Freshlyground
- Get Cape. Wear Cape. Fly (2011)
- Tay Grin
- John Wizards (2014)
- Mafikizolo (2014)
- MistaJam (2011)
- Oliver "Tuku" Mtukudzi (2011)
- Noisettes (2011)
- Sauti Sol
- The Maccabees
- The Very Best (2014)
- Young Fathers (2015)
- Zone Fam (2014)
- Shishani Vranckx

== Locations/Venues ==
Locations/Venues
Year	Location	Venue
2025	Nkhotakota	Fish Eagle Bay Lodge
2024	Nkhotakota	Fish Eagle Bay Lodge
2019	Nkhata Bay	Kachere Kastle
2018	Leopard Bay, Lifuwa Salima	Kabumba Hotel.
2017	Chintheche, Nkhata Bay	Chintheche Inn
2016	Chintheche, Nkhata Bay	Chintheche Inn
2015	Mangochi	Sunbird Nkopola Lodge
2014	Mangochi	Sunbird Nkopola Lodge
2013	Lilongwe (City of Stars)	Woodlands Hotel
2012	X	X
2011	X	X
2010	X	X
2009	Mangochi	Sunbird Nkopola Lodge
2008	Senga Bay	Sunbird Livingstonia Lodge
2007	Chintheche	Chintheche Inn
2006	Chintheche	Chintheche Inn
2005	Chintheche	Chintheche Inn
2004	Chintheche	Chinteche Inn

== Other events ==
Dusty Orange Projects Et Al, producers of the Lake of Stars Malawi Arts Festival organise other events in Malawi in addition to the flagship festival, including Set It Off (Women in the Arts - Women Are Artists not Muses), Day of Ideas (Youth Festival - Investing in Our Young Minds), Children's Future Festival (Children in the Arts) and film festivals (EU Film Festival & Lilongwe Shorts).
