= Suffix (musician) =

Malawian gospel rapper

- Born: Aubrey Ghambi; Lilongwe, Malawi
- Genres: Afro rap
- Occupations: Musician songwriter
- Years active: 2012–present

Aubrey Ghambi, best known as Suffix, is a Malawian Hiphop Artist and songwriter. In 2020, he won a UMP Award in best gospel act. In 2018, his album titled "Before I Sleep" won the category Album of the Year in UMP Awards and he was nominated as Best Hip Hop Artist as well as Best Urban Gospel. In 2016, was nominated for the same category and award.

In 2022, he won the Africa-Based award in artist of the Year given out by Rapzilla, the top and biggest Christian hip hop site in the world and an online magazine, beating Limoblaze, Rehmahz, Angeloh, Spillz-Ochai and Drakare in the category.

His song "D.Y.M." was featured on Christian Hip Hop (Rapzilla), the world's largest online magazine .

In 2016, he was a brand ambassador for Hip-Hop Online Magazine's Cancer Awareness Campaign.

== Background ==
=== Early life ===
Ghambi was born in Chitipa. His home village is Mzuzu and is a Tumbuka by tribe. He did his primary school in Mzuzu as well as his secondary school education.

== Music career ==
Suffix began pursuing music in 2010 and later became known in Malawi’s hip-hop scene for lyrics that address social, economic, and political issues. His debut album, Before I Sleep, won Album of the Year at the Malawi UMP Awards in 2018. The same year he headlined the Lake of Stars Festival alongside Major Lazer from the United States and Sauti Sol from Kenya. The festival has been listed by CNN as one of the top African music festivals to attend.

In addition to his music career, Suffix has been involved in social and governance advocacy initiatives. He has collaborated with the former United States Ambassador to Malawi, David Young, and former Anti-Corruption Bureau Director Martha Chizuma on initiatives aimed at promoting integrity and public accountability. He has also worked with the German nonprofit organization Viva con Agua on creative advocacy projects addressing social issues.

Suffix studied Economics at Blantyre International University, where he earned a bachelor’s degree. After graduating, he worked with Young Life in Malawi for five years as a Bookkeeper and Developing Global Leaders Coordinator, supporting financial management and mentoring university students participating in leadership development programs.

He later moved to the United States to pursue graduate studies at Michigan State University, where he completed a Master’s degree in Public Policy. During his studies he also worked as a research assistant with Afrobarometer, contributing to research on governance, democracy, and public opinion across Africa.

== Education ==
Naotcha Primary School

Chiradzulu Secondary School 2009

Catholic University Malawi (2013)

Blantyre International University (2016)

Michigan State University (2026)

== Achievements ==
=== UMP Awards ===
Year	Nominee / work	Award	Result
2020	Himself	Best Gospel Act	Won
2020	Yobwata	Best Music Video of Year 2020	Won
2018	Himself	Best Gospel Act	Nominated
2018	Himself	Best Urban Gospel	Nominated
2018	Himself	Best Live Act	Nominated
2016	Himself	Best Gospel Act	Nominated

=== Christian hip hop (Rapzilla award) ===
Year	Nominee / work	Award	Result
2022	Himself	Artist of The Year	Won

=== AGMA Awards ===
Year	Nominee / work	Award	Result
2017	Himself	Hip Hop Artist of Excellence	Nominated
2017	Himself	Video of Excellence	Nominated

== See also ==
- Fredokiss (musician)
