= Napoleon Dzombe =

Businessman and philanthropist in Malawi

Napoleon Dzombe is a businessman and philanthropist in Malawi. He is the founder of Blessing Hospital.

== Life ==
He was a major figure in giving aid during the 2001-2002 drought in Malawi. Dzombe also works to promote a better agricultural practices in Malawi. He owns and operates Madalitso Food Production and also owns a sugar corporation. Dzombe's company Mtalimanja Holdings Limited has also invested millions of dollars in large scale Rice milling machinery.

In 2012, Dzombe lead a group of businessmen who made a major investment in biodiesel technology for Malawi.

His work was the subject of the 2005 short film "A Warm Heart".

Dzombe is a member of the Church of Christ.

== Sources ==
- Nu Skin article on Dzombe
- BYU TIV article on Dzombe
- Nu Skin article on Dzombe
- Feb. 8, 2013 Malawi News Agency article on Dzombe donating food to a hospital
- Article on agricultural village founded by Dzombe
