= UNICAF =

University in Cyprus

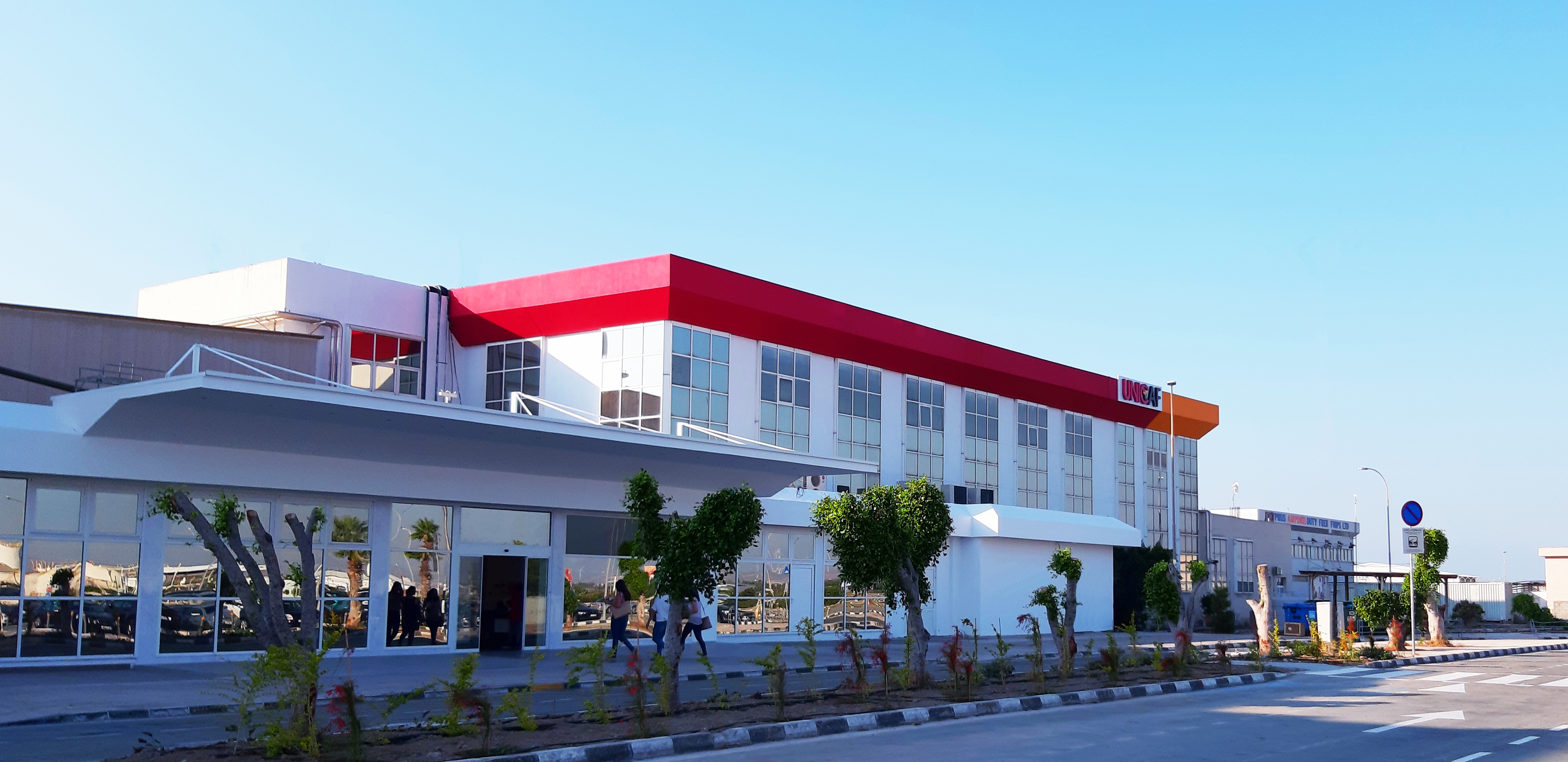
- Established: 2012; 14 years ago
- Founder: Nicos Nicolaou
- Headquarters: Larnaca, Cyprus
- Staff: 500+
- Website: unicaf.org

UNICAF (/ˈjuːnɪkæf/) is a Cypriot for-profit online and blended learning institution operating in Africa, founded by Nicos Nicolaou in 2012. It partners with other universities to provide university education.

== Overview ==
UNICAF was founded by Greek Cypriot entrepreneur Nicos Nicolaou in 2012 and is headquartered in Larnaca, in the old Larnaca Airport buildings. Its name is a combination of "UNIC", the official abbreviation for the University of Nicosia, and the first two letters of "Africa".

In 2016, a campus was constructed in Malawi using private and public investment. Initial enrollment was limited to students in Africa.

UNICAF established campuses and learning centres in South Africa, the DRC, Egypt, Ghana, Kenya, Malawi in 2015, Morocco, Nigeria, Uganda, Zambia, and Zimbabwe. It had enrolled more than 60,000 students in its partnership programs by 2016. It operates learning centres that provide access to its digital platform. It offers a number of bachelor's, master's, and doctorate programs. It has a physical presence in 12 African countries. The campuses aim to provide student services and face-to-face tutorials to support the online and blended delivery models.

UNICAF is accredited by each of the respective regulators and by the British Accreditation Council. As of December 2024, it has partnerships with the British universities Liverpool John Moores University, the University of East London, and the University of Suffolk.

== See also ==
- List of universities in Zambia
