= Bingu International Conference Centre =

International Conference Centre of Malawi

Bingu wa Mutharika International Convention Centre
- Bingu wa Mutharika International Convention Centre
- Interactive map of Bingu wa Mutharika International Convention Centre
- Full name: Bingu wa Mutharika International Convention Centre
- Location: Lilongwe, Malawi
- Coordinates: 13.9539786°S 33.7922517°E
- Capacity: 500 rooms

Construction
- Groundbreaking: 2012
- Built: 2011/12/11 - 2012/11/11
- Opened: 2015/02/21
- Cost: 55 million USD

Bingu wa Mutharika International Convention Centre (also known as Bingu International Conference Centre or BICC) is an international conference centre located within the Umodzi Park Resort complex in Lilongwe, Malawi. The venue hosts events of various sizes, from board meetings and seminars to major conferences and large-scale events. Since opening in late 2015, it has hosted several international conferences, celebrity weddings, political summits, expositions, and music concerts. In June 2023, 400 scientists, policymakers, farmers and practitioners from 35 countries met at the ANHA's eighth Agriculture, Nutrition and Health Academy Week, where experts shared ideas to inform policies designed to address world development challenges.

== History ==
=== Etymology ===
The convention centre was named after former Malawian President, the late Bingu wa Mutharika, who conceived the idea of enabling Malawi to host high-profile international conferences including the Southern African Development Community (SADC) and the COMESA.

=== Construction ===
According to the director of tourism in Malawi, Isaac Katopola, the Malawi Government contributed over $55 million in 2011 as the development budget for the construction of the conference. The conference has rooms that can accommodate over 500 people with fully functioning equipments. The walls and corridors are also adorned with African art work. The government also borrowed over $95 million (K30 billion) from the People's Republic of China for building the conference.The money was also used to build Presidential Hotel and the Presidential Villas under a loan agreement which is payable in 30 years.

== Structures and use ==
The conference has a square for event space with a capacity of 5000pax.It has three halls with a capacity of 1500pax combined. It has a sandpiper boardroom for intimate space that holds up to 25pax, including 4 large cinema-style meeting rooms with each having a capacity of 60 attendants. It also has 4 small cinema-style meeting rooms with a capacity of 50 attendants. Notable people who visited the conference include the president of Zambia, Edgar Lungu, President of World Bank, Makhtar Diop, Mozambican President Filipe Nyusi, and former Tanzanian president Jakaya Kikwete. Riaad Moosa also performed at the conference in March 2019 at the conference's auditorium.

In 2025 the local Unicaf university's vice chancellor Robert Ridley graduated the students here.

== Location ==
The conference is located in the middle of the capital, Lilongwe. It is part of a complex called Umodzi Park and is close to Kamuzu International Airport and other cultural significant historical sites. Umodzi Park was designed to accommodate a various activities including business meetings, exhibitions, conferences, banquets, and other special events. It is also close Lilongwe Wildlife Centre which attracts tourists from and outside the country.
