= Fredokiss =

Malawian rapper

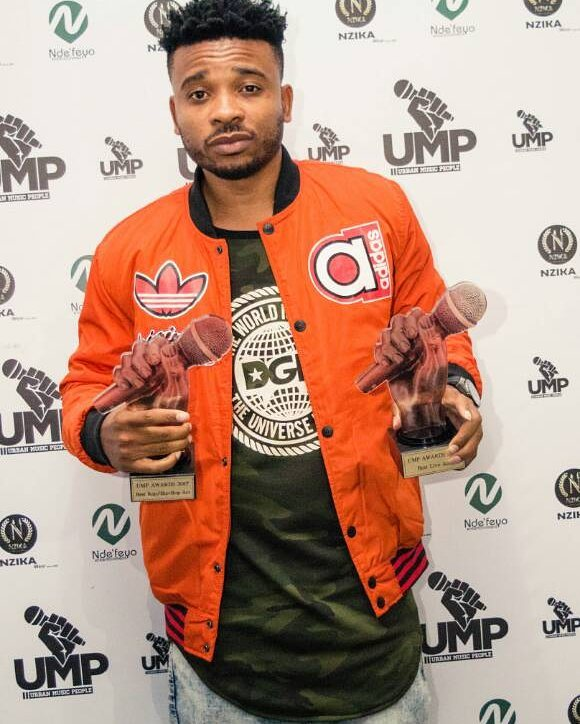
- Fredokiss in 2017
- Born: Fredo Penjani Kamlepo Kalua; March 28, 1986 (age 40); Blantyre, Malawi
- Other names: Mtchana; Fredo; Fredo Ase
- Occupations: Singer; songwriter; rapper; dancer
- Years active: 2002–present
- Works: Fredokiss discography; Discography; production; videography
- Children: 2
- Awards: Full list
- Musical career
- Genres: R&B; hip hop; pop
- Instrument: Vocals
- Label: Mikozi

Fredo Penjani Kamlepo Kalua (born March 28, 1986), best known as Fredokiss, is a Malawian singer, rapper and songwriter. In 2020, he was nominated in UMP Award in Best Hip Hop Act and his music video "Dadada" won Music Video of the Year. In 2017, he won three categories namely, Artist of the Year, Best rapper and Best Live Act.

== Background ==
=== Early life ===
Kalua was born on March 28, 1986, in Lilongwe and raised in Blantyre. His home village is Kasungu and he is a Tumbuka by tribe. He completed his primary schooling in Lilongwe as well as his secondary school education.

== Achievements ==
=== UMP Awards ===
Year	Nominee / work	Award	Result
2020	Dadada	Best Music Video of Year	Won
2020	Himself	Best Music Video of Year 2020	Nominated
2020	Himself	Humanitarian Award	Won
2019	Ndagoma – Fredokiss ft Bucci and AK	Music Video of the Year	Won
2018	Himself	Artist of the Year	Nominated
2018	Gwamba ft Fredokiss – Nthawi Zanji	Collaboration of the Year	Nominated
2018	Himself	Best Hip Hop Artist/Group	Nominated
2018	Himself	Best Live Act	Nominated
2017	Himself	Artist of the Year	Won
2017	Himself	Best Rap/Hip Hop Artist	Won
2017	Himself	Best Live Act	Won
2016	Himself	Best Hiphop Artist	Won

== See also ==
- Princess Chitsulo
- Paul Banda
- Sangie
