= Young Kay =

Hyphen (Young Kay)
- Born: June 11, 1986 (age 40); Blantyre
- Occupations: Rapper, songwriter
- Years active: 2007–present

Francis Kaphuka (born June 11, 1986), known professionally as Hyphen and formerly as Young Kay is a popular Malawian hip-hop artist that is known for fusing local Malawian folk songs with international genres. He is known for his vibrant sound and ability to mix Chichewa and English lyrics eloquently in his rhymes. This has earned him recognition as one of Malawi's best lyricists. He has been voted as Malawi’s best rapper twice Joy FM fans and in 2021 was crowned King of Malawian Hiphop by the audience of one of Malawi's biggest online platforms, Mikozi Network. He was introduced to Malawian audiences under Rush records with the single “I’m Home” and his popularity grew to solidify his place as one of Malawi's greatest hip-hop artists. He has had subsequent hits since then. His song “zipepese” number 2 on FM 101 Power’s urban music chart. In 2010 he collaborated with Malawian born rising act Onesimus Muzik on a track titled "Beautiful" He also collaborated with Lucius Banda, Tigris, and Maskal on track "Malawi Goodlife" in 2011.

== Discography ==
- Exhale (album) - 2007
- First Impression (album) - 2009
- Pauchidolo (mixtape) - 2012

== Television appearances ==
- Big Brother Africa, 2010

== Accolades ==
- Hip Hop Honors, 2011
