= Priscilla Kayira =

Malawian radio broadcaster, presenter and television personality

Priscilla Kayira is a Malawian radio broadcaster, presenter and a television personality. In 2019, Kayira was nominated the Personality of the Year along with Luna and Sharon Chirwa in UMP Media Awards.She won the same award in the same category in 2020 and 2022 and continued to win many awards as a Media personality, locally and internationally. She is a Tumbuka by tribe.

she is currently Malawi’s most followed media personality

She attended Marymount Secondary School. She has a degree in Mass communications (Electronic media) obtained from Daystar University in Kenya in 2016. She has worked with various media stations and organizations in Malawi and Kenya.
