= Martse =

Malawian musician

- Born: Martin Nkhata; May 18, 1994; Blantyre, Malawi
- Died: 23 May 2022 (aged 28)
- Genres: Hip hop; Afrobeat
- Occupations: Musician songwriter producer
- Years active: 2000–2022

Martin Nkhata (18 May 1994 – 23 May 2022), known professionally as Martse, was a Malawian rapper, songwriter, and activist. He began his musical career in 2004 when he was discovered by Dzimbiri of the now defunct Khamradzi Music Group.

== Background ==
=== Early life & Career ===
Martin Nkhata was born on 18 May 1994, at Queen Elizabeth Hospital in Blantyre, Malawi. He grew up in Blantyre and later moved to Lilongwe with his family. Before pursuing music professionally, Nkhata produced beats casually for his friends. He rose to fame with his verse in Revolver and Tanaposi John Chilembwe. In 2015, he had hits like Mwapindulanji, Pin Ya BlackBerry, Amayenda Ndi Bae, and Grace Chi before the release of Mwano that features Kell Kay in February 2016. Mwano became his biggest hit and won Song of the Year at the UMP Awards and the following year he won Best Rap Act of 2016.

Inspired by his upbringing, his work often revolved around identity, everyday life, love, and political activism.

Martse graduated from Lilongwe University of Agriculture and Natural Resources in 2018.

Nkhata died on 23 May 2022 at Queen Elizabeth Hospital in Blantyre after suffering severe burns from a house fire in Mangochi. Nkhata's family suspects foul play in regards to his manner of death, though such claims have yet to be confirmed.

=== Aftermath ===
Soon after Nkhata's death, it was reported that his death was due to his uncooperation to selling of his soul to the Satanism. On 23 May 2022, a medical practitioner who shared about Nkhata's death on Twitter faced public condemnation.

On 25 May 2022, Eli Njuchi was attacked while attending Nkhata's funeral; he was suspected to have been involved in Nkhata's death.
