= Nyasa Music Awards =

Annual music industry award ceremony

- Awarded for: Outstanding achievements in the entertainment industry
- Country: Malawi
- Presented by: Malawi music industry coalition
- Hosted by: Joy Nathu Priscilla Kayira
- First award: January 13, 2017; 9 years ago
- Final award: 2023

Highlights
- Most awards: Faith Mussa

Nyasa Music Awards are Malawian music awards that were established in early 2017 to celebrate entertainers and other minorities in music, fashion and philanthropy. The annual presentation event that takes place in major cities of the country features performances by artists and they are one of the major Malawi's music industry awards. The event recognizes Malawian music from all genres, including traditional, soul, and gospel. The awards also promote culture, with the 2017 event host of an African Print party that encourages people to showcase their traditional outfits. The awards include media sister awards and its categories are split into male and female.

== List of ceremonies ==
The 2018 inaugural ceremony was held at Comesa Hall in Blantyre. The 2019 NMA took place on December 14 at Crossroads Hotel in Blantyre, Malawi. The ceremony included fashion and media categories. Ben Wandawanda won the Fashion Icon award, and Jai Banda won the Lifetime Achievement Award.

== Current award categories ==
=== Music ===
- Song of the Year
- Best Hip Hop Act
- Best Dancehall Act
- Album of the Year
- Artist of the Year (Female)
- Artist of the Year (Male)
- Music Video of the Year
- Best Gospel Artist
- Best New Artist (Female)
- Best New Artist (Male)
- Producer of the Year
- Best Duo/Group
- Lifetime Achievement

=== Media ===
- Best TV personality
- Media Legend
- Best Radio DJ/Personality
- Best Entertainment writer

=== Fashion ===
- Model of the Year
- Living Legend
- Fashion Icon
- Most Fashionable Celebrity
- Designer of the Year

== Host Cities ==
Year	Country	Host city	Venue	Host(s)
2017	Malawi	Blantyre	Golf Club	Joy Nathu
2018	Malawi	Comesa Hall, Blantyre	Golf Club	Chifundo Maganga
2019	Malawi	Lilongwe	BICC	

== Recipients ==
List of selected recipients and years:

Category	Nominee / work (and year)	Result	Reference
Song of the Year	Faith Mussa (2017) Janta – Wangongole (2018)	Won	
Best Hip Hop Artist	Fredokiss (2018)	Won	
Best Gospel Artist	Faith Mussa (2018)	Won	
Best R&B Artist of the year	Kell Kay (2018) Kell Kay (2017)	Won	
Best Reggae Artist	Black Missionaries (2018)	Won	
Best Secular Artist	Nepman (2018)	Won	
Best Acoustic Artist	Faith Mussa (2018)	Won	
Best Producer	AK on the board (2018)	Won	
Best Male Artist	Tay Grin (2018)	Won	
Best Female Artist	Zani Challe (2018)	Won	
Best Afro pop Artist	Stitch Fray (2018)	Won	
Best Group	Zathu Band (2018)	Won	
Best Female Broadcaster	Jean Chalungama (2018)	Won	
Best Live Act	Faith Mussa (2018)	Won	
Best Video Director	Sukez (2018)	Won	
Album of the Year	Lawi – Sunset in the Sky (2018)	Won	
Best New Comer	Episodes (2018)	Won	
Best Dancehall artist of the year	Malinga Mafia (2018)	Won	
Best collaboration of the year	Tsidya lina – Hyphen ft Malinga Mafia (2018)	Won	
Best Live Act	Faith Mussa (2017)	Won	

== Controversies ==
On 29 March 2018, the Nyasa Music Awards faced public criticism when it selected the South African television personality Somizi Somgaga Mhlongo to host the year’s awards. Homophobic Malawians slammed the awards choice as the host is known to be openly gay.

== See also ==
- Music of Malawi
