= Gwamba =

Malawian rapper based in Lilongwe

- Born: Duncan Zgambo; Lilongwe, Malawi
- Education: Malawi Adventist University
- Occupations: Rapper; philanthropist

Duncan Zgambo, professionally known as Gwamba, is a Malawi-born rapper and philanthropist.

== Early life ==
Gwamba is the youngest of four siblings. He grew up in area 18, Lilongwe, Malawi. In 2005 he and three of his friends formed a rap group called Pittie Boys, before Gwamba started his solo career in 2009.

== Music career ==
Gwamba's rap career was inspired by US rapper 50 Cent and local musician The Basement. He released a single with the Pittie Boiz called "Work That Thing", which got airplay on FM 101 radio's Gowelo Beatz in 2008. Gwamba started recording as a solo artist 2009 and has made singles such as "Mmesa", "Tikakumane Kumadzi", "Sindingasiye Bawa", "Carina ya Mdala". In 2013 Gwamba released 3 singles: "Ndi Ofewa" featuring EMM Q, "Bola Kusache" featuring Nesnes and "Ndiyima Pachulu" featuring Bucci. Ndiyima Pachulu's music video was released in February 2014.

Gwamba has worked with local hip-hop acts such as BarryOne, Young Kay, Phyzix and dancehall musician Blak jak. As a gospel artist, Gwamba has released a number of singles such as "Better" and "Alleluyah" both featuring Emm Q and "Nzeru" featuring Maskal. In 2015, he won the award for Artist of The Year at the UMP Awards, he also won three awards at the 2017 UMP awards, an award at the 2017 Nyasa music awards, and an award at the 2018 UMP Awards.

== Philanthropy ==
In 2019, Gwamba became the CEO for Shepherd Bushiri Foundation, a humanitarian organization founded by Dr Shepherd Bushiri. Gwamba also has his own charity programs, including the 2016 1 Million Kwacha Jesus is My Boss Football and Netball Trophy in area 18, 2017 2 Million Kwacha Football and Netball Trophy in area 18, 2017 1 Million Kwacha football and Netball trophy in Ntcheu, a donation of 500,000 Kwacha at Pashello charitable trust in Chikwawa in 2016, a donation of 2 million Kwacha to Pashello charitable trust in 2018, and a donation of 3 Million Kwacha of Pashello charitable trust in 2019.
