= UMP Awards =

Malawian media awards

- Awarded for: Outstanding achievements in the music industry of Malawi
- Country: Malawi
- Presented by: Chitoliro Productions
- First award: 2016; 10 years ago
- Website: ump-awards.com

The Urban Music People (often simply the UMP Awards) are major Malawi's urban music industry awards, established in 2015, and also include Fashion, and Media sister awards. Most of the categories are dichotomized into male and female. The ceremony is held annually, usually in late November or December, with the judging process starting in October of the same year. The nominations are typically announced at the end of September. The winners receive a gold-plated statuette.

== Current Award Categories ==
=== Music ===
- Best Hip Hop Act
- Best Dancehall Act
- Song of the Year
- Music Video of the Year
- Album of the Year
- Artist of the Year (Female)
- Artist of the Year (Male)
- Best Gospel Act
- Best New Artist (Female)
- Best New Artist (Male)
- Producer of the Year
- Best Duo/Group
- Lifetime Achievement

=== Media ===
- Media Legend
- Best TV personality
- Best Radio DJ/Personality
- Best Entertainment writer

=== Fashion ===
- Living Legend
- Fashion Icon
- Model of the Year
- Designer of the Year
- Most Fashionable Celebrity

== Host Cities ==
Year	Country	Host city	Venue	Host(s)
2016	Malawi	Blantyre	Golf club	joy Nathu
2017	Malawi	Blantyre	Golf Club	DT
2018	Malawi	Blantyre	Golf Club	Joy Nathu
2019	Malawi	Lilongwe	BICC	Priscilla Kayira

== See also ==
- Nyasa Music Awards
- Ku Mingoli Bash
- Maso Awards
- Music of Malawi
- Website
