= Music of Malawi =

The music of Malawi has historically been influenced by its triple cultural heritage of British, African, and American music. Malawians, known for their history as travellers and migrant workers, have contributed to the spread of their music across the African continent, blending it with various musical forms. A significant factor in this musical amalgamation was World War II, during which soldiers transported music to distant lands and brought it back, leading to the popularity of guitar and banjo duos as dance bands by the war's end. Both instruments were imported. Additionally, Malawians working in mines in South Africa and Mozambique influenced the fusion of music styles, giving rise to genres such as Kwela.

In the colonial period, Malawi witnessed the emergence of a few well-known singers. Notable among them was Tony Bird, a folk-rock singer-songwriter born in Nyasaland, whose music blended Malawian and Afrikaner traditions. His popularity led to tours with Ladysmith Black Mambazo in the 1980s.

Under President Hastings Banda, the Malawian state censored music deemed sexually or politically subversive. This policy limited the international recognition of artists between 1964 and 1994. Following the first multiparty elections in 1994, artists gained the freedom to express themselves publicly, fostering the growth and development of Malawian music into the diverse forms heard today.

Since 1994, the country has experienced steady growth in its music industry and local celebrities. Due to past suppression, many emerging artists are young, with figures like Young Kay receiving support from industry veterans, contributing to the evolution of Malawian music.

Internationally, numerous Malawian artists have gained recognition. Malawian music received recognition at the 58th Grammy Awards in 2015 with the nomination of Zomba Prison Project's "I Have No Everything Here" for Best World Music Album.

== Music of Malawi ==
=== Kwela Music ===
In the late 1960s, South African kwela music was popular in Malawi. The country produced its own Kwela stars that were not as popular as the South African counterparts, but contemporary Kwela artists like Daniel Kachamba & His Kwela Band have enjoyed popularity. South African Kwela music was first created by Malawian immigrants who, upon moving to South Africa, fused their music with local sounds. The word, 'Kwela', in Chichewa means 'to climb' which is similar to the South African definition, which means to "get up" or "rise".

=== Malawian jazz ===
In spite of the name, Malawian jazz has little in common with its American namesake. Rural musicians played acoustic instruments, often in very traditional ways. These performers include Jazz Giants, Linengwe River Band, Mulanje Mountain Band and Chimvu Jazz. By the beginning of the 1970s, electric guitars had become common and American rock and roll, soul and funk influences the music scene, resulting in a fusion called afroma. New Scene, led by Morson Phuka, was the most well-known exponent of afroma.

Contemporary Malawian jazz artists include Wambali Mkandawire, South Africa based Ray Phiri and US-based Masauko Chipembere Jr.

Jazz concerts can be seen throughout Malawi. Many Malawian Jazz bands perform regularly at local hotels and clubs. Sunday Jazz is a popular event in many lodges and hotels in Malawi, where it is a social event for people in the suburban areas to meet and listen to Jazz music on Sundays.

=== Malawian kwasa kwasa ===
Influenced by the 1980s music from the Congo, Malawi's own kwasa kwasa music grew. The 1980s saw soukous from the Democratic Republic of the Congo (then Zaire) become popular, and result in a Malawian variety called kwasa kwasa.

=== Malawian hip-hop/rap ===
Since 1994, rap has surged in Malawi from urban centers such as Blantyre and Lilongwe to rural areas as Nkhata Bay or Chitipa. Rap scenes in Malawi has been connected through nationwide institutional networks of radio and newspapers. Hip Hop culture from the United States, South Africa, the United Kingdom and the Caribbean arrived through satellite television and video cassettes.

Real Elements is the first Malawian music group to record Malawian urban music. who brought to Malawi an urban American sound with chichewa lyrics. They were featured on Channel O and performed in Malawi and opened in the UK for hip hop artists like Blak Twang. They inspired a new genre of Malawian music in the form of the urban hip-hop and rap music styles that was uniquely Malawian.

Since the days of the Real Elements, the Malawian hip-hop genre has grown. This includes Young Kay, Phyzix, as well as international stars like Tay Grin, Gwamba and South African based St Bosseratti.

The hip-hop scene in Malawi continues to evolve with new school artists like Gwamba and Martse. Home Grown African, Tsar Leo. Rap and ragga competitions sponsored by private organizations are a common showcase for young performers.

English is the most used language in Malawi rap music, including in newspaper articles, discussions among youths, and radio broadcasts. However, for certain situations, Chichewa is considered the most appropriate language.

=== Malawian gospel music ===
Gospel music is one of Malawi's most popular music forms. It became popular in the 1990s. Pope John Paul II's 1989 visit did much to inspire the rise in gospel music, which was also fueled by the country's economic conditions and poverty. Popular Malawian gospel artists include Ndirande Anglican Voices, Ethel Kamwendo-Banda, Grace Chinga, Lloyd Phiri, George Mkandawire, and the Chitheka Family.

Malawi has seen a rise of diverse gospel music, particularly in the urban genre. Early hip-hop rappers include Chart Rock and The Strategy. Currently, David (formerly Stix from Real Elements, KBG, the founder of NyaLimuziK, and Gosple (Aubrey Mvula) are now the leaders in this form of gospel rap.

=== Malawian R&B ===
Malawi's R&B genre includes artists like Theo Thomson, Dan Lu, Bucci, and Kell Kay.

=== Malawian reggae ===
Individual artists such as Lucius Banda, Mlaka Maliro and Evison Matafale helped to raise the genre's profile. Malawian reggae music has been music of resistance and of struggle. Many of the themes in the music center around injustice, corruption and equality.

Mtafale formed a music group the Black Missionaries.

=== Malawian traditional music and dances ===
Traditional Malawian music has also found some commercial success, such as the folk fusionists Pamtondo, whose music uses rhythms from the Tumbuka, Lomwe, Makuwa and Mang'anja peoples. There have also been more traditionalist performers and banda, like Alan Namoko. In Malawi, traditional dances include Mganda, Malipenga and Chisamba.

=== Malawian pop/fusion ===
Esau Mwamwaya fuses traditional Malawian, pop and urban sounds.

== Music production ==
Before 1968, recordings in Malawi were made by mobile recording studios, and by the Federal Broadcasting Studios in Lusaka, Zambia. Nzeru Record Company (NRC), established in 1968, was the first recording studio in Malawi. However, the studio disappeared in 1972 due to a limited local market.

Between 1972 and 1989, most of the recordings were made in the studios of Radio Malawi, later called the Malawi Broadcasting Corporation. As the broadcaster was controlled by the government, the studios helped to filtrate music. Music was recorded in open-reel tapes and never was released on vinyl.

In 1988, the liberalization of the economy and the establishment of the Copyright Act of 1988 allowed entrepreneurs to found their own studios. At the end of the 1990s, small independent studios spread in Blantyre, Balaka, and Lilongwe.

The Church in Malawi opened Andiamo Studios, where the Christian Alleluya Band recorded its first album on cassette in 1988. In 1991, Alleluya Band's guitarist Paul Banda started Imbirani Yahwe Studios in Balaka Town. Since then, most of the Musicians in Malawi expect to have their own recording studio. For that reason, it's hard to find professionally-run recording studios in the country and record labels often have short lives. In some cases, music projects in Malawi are recorded by multiple studios.

Blantyre is the home of most Malawi recording studios. Young musicians interested in recording their song will record in recording studios which offer accessible options for recording a single (generally, one copy of the song) and then give them to a deejay with the hope they play the song on the air.

== Music festivals ==
- In 2004, Englishman Will Jameson started Lake of Stars Music Festival which has international artists and Malawians performing together.
- Since the advent of Lake of Stars, Malawi has seen a myriad of festivals pop up, some longer lived than other.
- 2021 Saw the first edition of Zomba City Festival after cancelling the previous year due to Corona. Zomba City Festival is an annual event, taking place on Labour Day weekend. Zomba City Festival aims to showcase the attractivity of Zomba to its visitors.

== Notable Malawian musicians ==
- Patience Namadingo
- Dan Lu
- Phyzix
- Lucius Banda
- Grace Chinga
- Fredokiss
- Pop Young
- Masauko Chipembere Jr
- Tay Grin (Limbani Kalinani)
- Evison Matafale
- Michael-Fredrick Paul Sauka
- Esau Mwamwaya
- Ritaa
- Real Elements
- Wambali Mkandawire
- Ray Phiri
- Gwamba
- Zomba Prison Project
- Tsar Leo
- Home Grown African
- Young Kay
- Blasto
- Kell Kay
- Driemo
