= Joseph Tembo =

Malawi musical artist (1977–2019)

- Also known as: Jozzy (Njombi)
- Born: Joseph Tembo; 18 September 1977; Malawi
- Origin: Chikwawa South, Southern Region, Malawi
- Died: 19 December 2019 (aged 42)
- Genres: Malawian Reggae; Reggae; Afro pop
- Occupations: Politician; Singer-Songwriter-Producer, Multi-instrumentalist
- Instruments: Vocals, Keyboard, Guitars, Drums
- Years active: 1997 –2019
- Label: Groove Magic

Joseph Tembo (18 September 1977 – 19 December 2019) was a musician and politician from Malawi. He had collaborated with Sally Nyundo, Lucius Banda, Mlaka Maliro and many other Malawian artists. He produced and promoted many upcoming artists including Andrew Matrauza, whose first successful single was Musadabwe. Tembo's style of music resembles Zimbabwean mbira music as he is a Sena, a southern Malawian tribe that has a common ancestry. For more than once he had performed and played alongside the late Oliver Mtukudzi.

== Singles ==
- "Dimingu"
- "Mbudye"
- "Denga Denga"
- "Samalira"

== Selected Songwriting and production credits ==
- Collins Bandawe - Tchekera Maluzi(Role: Music Producer)
- "Thandizo Langa album" – Artist: Grace Chinga (Role: Music Producer)
- " GOtv Malawi Theme Song Single" – Artists:Various Artists, (Roles: Music Producer, Vocalist, Instrumentalist)
- "Money and Power album" – Artist: Lucius Banda (Roles: Lead guitar and Keyboards)
- "Mwapindulanji album"(1997) – Artist: Billy Kaunda (Roles: Bass and Rhythm guitar, Percussions, Drum programming and Keyboards)
- "Ndipatseni Yankho album"(2005) – Artist: Thocco Katimba (Role: Music Producer)
- "Ndili Pamzere album" – Artist: Ethel Kamwendo Banda (Role: Music Producer)
- "Chindendelinde album" – Artist: Mafumu Matiki (Role: Music Producer) together with Collin Ali)
- "Denga Denga song"(Role: Composer)
- "Satana walephera song"(Role: Composer)
- "Samalira song"(Role: Composer)
- Great Angels Choir - mwasankha ine (producer)
- Ndirande Anglican Voices -producer
- Thoko Suya- producer
- Confidence Voices- producer
- Mount olive CCAP main choir (formerly naotcha CCAP)- produced all their first six albums
- Ruth Missi Thindwa- Mdzakangamira yesu, Chisomo producer of the ulbum

== Political life ==
He was the Member of Parliament for the Democratic Progressive Party (DPP) for Chikwawa South from 2009 to 2014.

== Illness and death ==
He died at the Kamuzu Central Hospital in Lilongwe after a short illness on 19 December 2019. Joseph Tembo died barely seven hours after former President Mutharika had appointed him into a Copyright Association of Malawi (Cosoma) board. He is survived by a wife and four children. He hailed from Tenesi Village, Traditional Authority Ngabu in Chikwawa district.
