= Tapps Bandawe =

Malawian record producer

Tapiwa "Tapps" Bandawe (born 1970) is a Malawian record producer. He lived in South Africa for two years before returning to Malawi.

== Career ==
He is credited for producing the music of popular Malawian singers and International ones, such as Lucky Dube, Brenda Fassie, Jozi (South Africa), 2Face (Nigeria), Nameless (Kenya), K’Millian (Zambia), Lucius Banda, Mlaka Maliro, Theo Thompson and Phyzix (Malawi) just to name a few. His studio is called Audio Vision Studio.

As a producer, Tapps is credited for helping the artist Tay Grin launch his hip-hop career by cutting the first Malawian Proudly African CD. He has also produced the song "Oh My Malawi" for Lucius Banda, and has worked with artists such as Maskal.
