= Lloyd Phiri =

Malawian musician

- Born: October 12, 1985 (age 40); Lilongwe, Malawi
- Genres: Gospel; Afrobeat
- Occupations: Musician songwriter
- Years active: 2000–present

Lloyd Phiri is a Malawian gospel musician and praise and worship leader. He released his debut album "Sachedwa Safulumira" (He does not hurry nor late) in 2013, containing 10 tracks which received positive reviews and established him as a rising star in the Malawian gospel music scene. He has since released several successful albums and singles, including "Mundikondane" (You love me), "Mwalaika", and "Ndilibe (I don't have)".

His music career started in the early 1990s, and he is known for his album "Sachedwa Safulumira," which was released in 2012.

After a period of inactivity, he released his ninth career album, "Pemphero Silinama," in 2023. He has performed at various music festivals and events in Malawi and beyond and has collaborated with other renowned gospel artists.

== Background ==
=== Early life ===
Lloyd Phiri was born on October 12, 1985, in Blantyre, Malawi. He grew up in a Christian family and developed a passion for music at a young age. He started his music career as a member of the Great Angels Choir before pursuing a solo career.

=== Music career ===
Phiri started his musical career in 1998. He has released eight albums and six video albums. In 2001, he released his first album "Musagwedezeke," and in 2013, he released his album "Sachedwa Safulumira". He has worked with other artists such as Allan Ngumuya, Favoured Sisters, Allan Chirwa, Wyclief Chimwendo, Ethel Kamwendo Banda, The Joshua Generation, Thoko Katimba, Kafita Nursery Choir, Maggie Mangani, the late Geoffrey Zigoma, Bertha Nkhoma, Living Waters Praise Team and Princess Chitsulo.

Phiri is known for his powerful and soulful voice, as well as his energetic live performances. He is also a worship leader at a local church.

== Discography ==
Some of Phiri's popular songs include:

- Mundikondane
- Ndilibe
- Sachedwa Safulumira
- Tsalani

== Personal life ==
Phiri married to his second wife, Elinat, on October 15, 2022.
