= Mpoto Awards =

Annual entertainment awards in Malawi

- Awarded for: Excellence in music, film, media, and arts
- Location: Northern Region
- Country: Malawi
- Presented by: Mpoto Awards Committee
- First award: 2022

Mpoto Awards, formerly Mzuzu Awards, are annual entertainment awards held in Malawi to recognize excellence in music, film, media, and the arts in the northern region of the country, particularly in Mzuzu. Established to celebrate northern Malawian talent, the awards have become a platform for showcasing local artists, filmmakers, and cultural figures.

The event attracts established performers as well as upcoming creatives, with winners selected through public voting and panels of industry experts. Notable past recipients include Pop Young, Billy Kaunda, Merchar and cultural activists from the northern districts of Rumphi, Mzimba, and Karonga.

== History ==
The Mpoto Awards were founded in the 2022 as part of a drive to show creativity in northern Malawi, which is sometimes overshadowed by events in the capital Lilongwe and the commercial city Blantyre. The awards expanded from music categories to include film, media personalities, sports figures, and community leaders.

== Categories ==
The Mpoto Awards have featured a variety of categories such as:

- Artist of the Year
- Best Female Artist
- Best Male Artist
- Best Hip Hop Act
- Best Gospel Artist
- Best Media Personality
- Lifetime Achievement

== Full list of winners ==
This is the list of winners for major Mpoto Awards categories:

Year	Winner	Category	Ref
2023	Pop Young	Best Artist of the Year	
2023	Lazz G	Best Hip-hop Artist of the Year	
2023	Merchah	Best RnB/Afro Artist of the Year	
2023	Dumis9ne 1	Best Reggae Artist of the Year	
2023	Captain Shaka	Best Dancehall Artist of the Year	
2023	Diego	Best New Artist of the Year	
2023	ChawaBeats	Best Producer of the Year	
2023	Golden City Tower	Best Promotion Platform of the Year	
2023	Yona Mlakatuli Gondwe	Best Poet of the Year	
2023	Explo Artworks	Best Graphic Designer of the Year	
2023	AG Photography	Best Photographer of the Year	
2023	Dir Tonney	Best Video Director of the Year	
2023	Pop Young	Best Music Video of the Year (Collect)	
2023	Patrick Kuyokwa	Best Young Entrepreneur of the Year	
2023	Chitipa United	Best Sports Team of the Year	
2023	Priscilla Soko	Best Athlete of the Year	
2023	Billy Kaunda	Lifetime Achievement Award	
2023	Nthondwa	Hip-hop and Culture Achievement Award	
2023	Akometsi	Regional Excellence Catalyst Award	
2024	Merchah	Best Music Artist of the Year	
2024	Shano Index	Best New Artist of the Year	
2024	ChawaBeats	Best Music Producer of the Year	
2024	Prince Chitz & Merchah	Best Music Video of the Year (Zamawa)	
2024	Bilton Kayange	Best Visual Artist of the Year	
2024	Director Tonny	Best Video Director of the Year	
2024	Upie Collection	Best Fashion Designer of the Year	
2024	Motte Jezz	Best Reggae/Dancehall Artist of the Year	
2024	Merchah	Best Afro/RnB Artist of the Year	
2024	Mzuzu Mafia	Best Hip-hop Artists of the Year	
2024	Ligo B & Emtee	Best Comedic Performer of the Year	
2024	Faith Music	Best Urban Gospel Artist of the Year	
2024	Maria Nundwe	Best Local Gospel Artist of the Year	
2024	Agness Munthali	Young Female Entrepreneur of the Year	
2024	Lumbani Gerald Khembo	Young Male Entrepreneur of the Year	
2024	Target Private Secondary School	Education Institution of the Year – Secondary Level	
2024	Moses Mzumala	Sportsman of the Year	
2024	Florence Chavula	Sportswoman of the Year	
2024	Mzuzu City Hammers	Best Sports Team of the Year	
2024	Uchindami Msowoya	Best Radio Personality of the Year	
2024	Chisomo Manda	Best TV Personality of the Year	
2024	AG Photography	Best Photographer of the Year	
2024	Chimwemwe Banda	Gender Equality Champion of the Year	
2024	Katoto SuperMarket	Regional Excellence Catalyst Award	
2024	Dr Judith Mkwaila	Lifetime Achievement Award	

== Impact ==
The awards have promoted northern Malawian identity in the national arts industry. They have also provided opportunities for lesser-known artists to gain recognition at national and international levels. Media coverage from outlets such as Times Media and Zodiak Broadcasting Station has sped the prestige of the awards.

== See also ==
- Malawi Music Awards
