= Tsar Leo =

Malawian Singer

- Born: Leo Siwale; 5 June 1995 (age 31)
- Origin: Malawi
- Genres: Hip hop, R'n'B
- Occupations: Rapper, singer, songwriter,
- Instrument: Vocals
- Years active: 2014–present
- Label: Independent
- Website: tsarleo.com

Leo Siwale (born 5 June 1995), known professionally by his stage name Tsar Leo, is a Malawian rapper, singer and songwriter. He was nominated as Malawi's Best New Artist of the Year for 2015.

== Life and career ==
Based in Malawi’s capital city, Lilongwe, Tsar Leo came into the limelight in 2014 after releasing "Things We Do" featuring KeiM. Since then, he has so far released a string of successful singles. "The Other Side" was Tsar Leo's international breakthrough, featuring in different music channels across Africa. The song was nominated in the 2016 Independent Music Awards. He has also performed with artists from other countries like Zambia's A-Team

Tsar Leo is well known for fusing rapping and singing, with an audible contrast between typical hip-hop beats and melody, abrasive rapping coupled with softer accents, delivered with an egotistical lyricism, a style popularised by Drake and Big Sean.

He is popular among young people due to the fact that he performs his songs in English and that hip hop, known as urban music in Malawi, is a music taste for this age group. He has headlined a number of urban music festivals such as Malawi Urban Music. He has worked with other renowned artist in Malawi including: Lawi, Faith Mussa and has shared stage with: Tay Grin; Hazel Mak; Theo Thomson; Piksy, Sonye, Dan Lu, Nessness and Black Missionaries.

In 2020, Siwale released his EP “OldTimes GoodTmes” & his debut album “ENERGY”.

He lists Drake, J Cole and Kendrick Lamar among those who have influenced his style and interest in music.

In 2025, Tsar Leo in collaboration with Producer Hundred Aims to release their extended play Echoes on 18 April 2025 with popular hits like "Chosangalatsa" featuring Malawi's sensation Macelba.

== Activism ==
Tsar Leo joined hands with Plan International Malawi and Amplified Movement on a series of projects that advocate children's rights in Malawi through music. He performed a song, titled Bring Them Home, with an ensemble of Malawian musicians. The song addresses the issue of child trafficking.

== Nominations ==
- Malawi Music of the Year 2016 for the Other Side. Other nominees in the category include: Tay Grin, Zani Challe and Dan Lufani.
- Malawi Best New Artist of the Year (2015)

MTV Base listed Tsar Leo as one of the 2016 top 10 hottest hip-hop artists from Malawi.

== Discography ==
- Blessed LP
- OldTimes GoodTimes EP
- Energy
- Still and Always EP
- Echoes EP

== See also ==
- Music of Malawi
- Dan Lufani
