= Maskal =

Maskal may refer to:

- Maskal, Chitradurga, Karnataka, India
- Maskal, Perm Krai, Russia
- Maskal (singer), Malawian Afro-R&B singer
- Maskal, Tumakuru, Karnataka, India
- Maskal, Bidar, Karnataka, India

== See also ==
- Meskel, a Christian holiday in the Ethiopian Orthodox and Eritrean Orthodox churches
