= Lawi (Malawian singer) =

- Born: Francis Phiri; 1986 (age 39–40); Blantyre, Malawi
- Origin: Malawi
- Genres: Afro-jazz, Afro-soul, World music
- Occupations: Singer-songwriter, record producer
- Years active: 2000s–present
- Label: Independent

Lawi (born Francis Phiri in 1986) is a Malawian Afro-jazz and Afro-soul artist, singer-songwriter, and record producer. He has earned recognition across Africa for his blend of Malawian tradition with global jazz and soul sounds.

== Early life ==
Lawi was born and raised in Blantyre, Malawi. He began playing guitar during church services at Nkolokosa Assemblies of God under the mentorship of Bishop Andrew Dube. One of his early inspirations was Isaac Mkukupha, the legendary Malawian jazz artist, whom Lawi credits for shaping his musical journey.

== Career ==
Lawi started with hip-hop tracks like High Morale and Amenyele before transitioning into Afro-jazz and Afro-soul. His music is noted for its message-driven lyrics, cultural pride, and live instrumentation.

=== Albums ===
- Sunset in the Sky (2017) – A 25-track spiritual and introspective album, launched at Bingu International Convention Centre in Lilongwe.
- Thirties (2022) – Featured singles such as Musawalange and Timalira, highlighting themes of maturity and identity.
- My Father’s Land (2025) – A self-produced album focused on African pride and heritage, premiered on Channel Africa.

== Performances ==
Lawi has headlined major shows in Malawi and beyond. His performances often include collaborations with regional stars such as PJ Powers and the Ndingo Brothers. In 2023, he co-headlined a concert with Congolese artist Awilo Longomba, sponsored by Castel Malawi.

== Ambassadorships ==
In 2024, Lawi was appointed as a global ambassador for Mary's Meals, a school feeding charity. He also became the face of Mount Mulanje, promoting environmental conservation through the Mulanje Mountain Conservation Trust.

== Controversy ==
In early 2024, Lawi requested the removal of his music from streaming platform Mvelani.com, citing unauthorized distribution and copyright issues.

== Discography ==
| Year | Album | Notes |
|---|---|---|
| 2017 | Sunset in the Sky | 25-track debut, launched at BICC |
| 2022 | Thirties | Mature themes, featured Musawalange |
| 2025 | My Father’s Land | African identity and pride, premiered on Channel Africa |

== See also ==
- Music of Malawi
- Lucius Banda
- Wambali Mkandawire
