= Moses Makawa =

Malawian musician

Moses Makawa is a Malawian musician and songwriter. He has collaborated with Lucius Banda, Billy Kaunda, Phungu Joseph Nkasa, and Katelele Ching'oma. Makawa is the maker of ‘Ali Mmanjamanja'. His themes in his music remain about witchcraft, magic, love, criticism, blasts on perpetrators of injustices. In 2010s, he partnered with Katelele Ching'oma and Mozambican Afro Kilos in a song "Ndilandileni".

== Background ==
Makawa attended his primary school education at Chibathe before going to Vonken Community Day Secondary School in Mulanje. In 2003, he left from the choir he was in and formed his own music group which played music using locally made musical instruments. He named it New Generations Band and went around playing with them till 2006. In 2010, he released his third studio album titled ‘Khuzumile (love portion)’ which sold over 30,000 copies in the first week.
