= Skeffa Chimoto =

Malawian musician (born 1981)

- Born: November 27, 1981 (age 44); Lilongwe, Malawi
- Genres: Reggae; Afrobeat
- Occupations: Musician songwriter producer
- Years active: 2003–present
- Spouse: Thandi Chimoto

Skeffa Chimoto is a Malawian musician and songwriter. His debut sophomore album "Nabola Moyo (as Iong as I am alive)" was well received and critically acclaimed, topping music charts all over Malawi.

His other album ‘Ndife Amodzi’ which had hits such as ‘Ndakusowa’, ‘Sungamchose’, title track ‘Ndife Amodzi’ and ‘Ulendo’ saw success in the Malawi music industry when he sold over 70,000 copies within a week. He has collaborated with various artists such as Dalisoul from Zambia, Billy Kaunda, Allelluya Band and Katelele Ching'oma.

He is also a civil servant and works for the Ministry of Health.

== Background ==
=== Early life and career ===
Chimoto was born in 1981 in Nkhotakota, Malawi. He grew up in a family of eight and was named after his grandfather. He started his music career in 2003 as a keyboardist and vocalist for various bands, including Patience Band and Health Education Band. He later formed his own band, Real Sounds Band, and released several successful albums, including "Nabola Moyo" and "Ndife Amodzi". He is known for his energetic live performances and his music, which often focuses on love and unity.

== Personal life ==
Chimoto is married to Thandi Chimoto and has a child with her. He is a Christian and often incorporates themes of faith and spirituality into his music.
