= Ritaa =

Malawian musician (born 1996)

- Also known as: Ritaa
- Born: Rita Mwantalli; 16 August 1996 (age 29); Blantyre, Malawi
- Origin: Blantyre
- Genres: Afro pop, R&B
- Occupations: Singer, songwriter, Entrepreneur, CEO @ Serene General Dealers, mother company of House of Beauty by Serene & Permanent Makeup by Serene, among others
- Instruments: Vocals, guitar
- Years active: 2015–present
- Label: Independent
- Website: officialritaa.com

Rita Kalonga (born 16 August 1996), known professionally by her stage name Ritaa, is a Malawian musician, singer, songwriter and Entrepreneur

== Life and career ==
Based in Malawi's commercial city, Blantyre, Ritaa's breakthrough came in 2016 after releasing "Chapatali". The song features one of Malawi's pop stars, Dan Lu. The song peaked at number 1 on local charts. Ritaa has worked with producers like BFB who used to produce for HHP and Blasto and has shared a stage with Tay Grin and co-headlined Carlsberg Malawi urban music bash. Ritaa draws her inspiration from the likes of Rihanna, Beyonce and the late Whitney Houston. She fuses Afro-pop, R&B, dancehall, and pop.

== Legacy ==
Chapatali is the first song by a female artist to chart on number 1 in Malawi Music top 100 and Weekly Malawi Music Top 20 chart by malawi-music.com. It remains the only song by a Malawian female artist to register over a hundred thousand downloads and half a million online streams on Malawi Music official website. In 2016, she also made history when she became the first Malawian female musician to have three songs at number 1 in the top 100 Malawi Music chart.

== Feminism and women's rights ==
Ritaa has been described as a feminist in the Malawi music industry. She has openly challenged patriarchy and championed for the rights of women in the country including freedom of dressing for women and girls in a country that is predominantly patriarchy.

== See also ==
- Music of Malawi
