= Real Elements =

Malawian hip-hop band

The Real Elements is a Malawian hip-hop band that gained notoriety in the 1990s and 2000s in Malawi. The group consisted of Marvel, Plan B, Stix, and Q. The group holds a special place in the Malawian music industry because it propagated Malawian hip-hop and paved the way for the Malawian hip-hop genre at a time when they were a few hip-hop artists in Malawi. Their music was considered the cutting edge in the Malawi music scene. Critics argue that is the best urban group that has come out of Malawi. They performed in Malawi and their music was also featured on Channel O beaming Malawian hip-hop for the first time to a Pan African audience. In their UK tours they opened for UK hip-hop artists like Blak Twang and Terri Walker. It was just as their international career was taking off that the group separated. Stix decided to leave the music industry (albeit three pending UK contracts) and follow religious pursuits. The group currently is pursuing personal interests.

They inspired Malawian hip-hop artists like Tsar Leo, Shaswish, Erasto, Advokett, and Tay Grin. They also inspired Malawian rap groups like the Blind Vision.

== Group members ==
The group members were:

=== Marvel (Lou Chikuni) ===
The influential member of the Real Elements released his solo album 'The Pride is slated' on June 3. As a pioneer of local (African) hip-hop, he made an impact after the release of the Real Elements’ album "I came". Marvel’s album has 12 songs in which he features Stix, Plan B, Dominic 1, The Bomb, Power 101’s Drew and Napi.

=== Plan B (Kimba Mutanda) ===
Kimba, was born in Denmark, and raised in Kenya, Zambia and Malawi. He attended Saint Andrews International High School. Where he befriended Marvel (Lewis Chikuni). After the group separated, he continued to perform in the UK. He performed at the Afrolution African hip Hop Festival in the UK. He also performed at the African Beach Party in the UK 2006.
Up until 2009 he was a member of UK band called Subsource. He left the band soon after the release of their first full-length album Tales From The Doombox. His final few months in the band are captured in the Colin Arnold-produced documentary Subsource – A Dubumentary.

Kimba has worked for Lake of Stars Festival and is now based in Mchinji H

=== Stix/Linguistix (David Kalilani) ===
He started out with the name Linguistix before shortening it to Stix. He was considered to be one of the top Malawian rappers at that time. He was embraced for his clever wordplay, clear lyrics and good quality of delivery in the Malawian music industry.

In addition to working with Real Elements, Stix lend his musical talents to other bands. Stix wrote the lyrics for "Parasite" for the UK group, Subsource in 2004. The track scored Subsource's first synchronisation deal – with Big Up Productions, a rock climbing video production company. The song was featured on "Dosage Volume 3" and "Parasite" was used as the lead track on the trailers. In 2008, the track was picked up by US network CBS for its season 5 premiere of primetime show "Numb3rs".

At the time he was still performing with Real Elements in 2004, Stix was to reach the pinnacle of his hip-hop career in Malawi and had 3 pending deals waiting for him in the UK. He instead decided to pursue a religious calling and become a Malawian gospel music rapper. He now goes by his biblical name, David. He has released gospel albums, Spirit Filled Volumes 1 & 2.

Popular international Malawian artist, Tay Grin (Limbani Kalilani), is cousin to Kalilani.

=== Producer Q (Qabaniso Malewezi) ===
Qabaniso Malewezi was the producer. It was while studying in the UK at Liverpool Institute for Performing Arts (LIPA) that he was introduced to Marvel by a mutual friend. After LIPA he went on to the Academy of Contemporary Music (ACM). He also writes and performs poetry.

Malewezi founded Abstrak Beatz Entertainment (ABE) a recording and music contracts company harnessing the development for the talented upcoming artists in Malawi.He then started an events production company called Qoncept Creative and has followed on with an arts hub called Kweza

== Music career ==
The music style of the Real Elements blends American hip-hop rhythms in a Malawian language of chichewa. The issue that the group raps about focuses on Africa and Malawi. Their music focuses on conscious music. Their first release as a group was a four song E.P entitled 'The I Came E.P'. Their music was popular in Malawi and in other African countries like Ghana.

The group, Real Elements travelled extensively and by mid-2002 the group’s members found themselves in London developing their song writing skills and recording. During their UK tour, they showcased their talent across London and opened shows for such hip-hop artists as Blak Twang and Terri Walker. Their song ‘These Elements’ was shot in London in 2004 and was featured prominently on Channel O, Africa's most premier music channel.

Stix and Kimba also did some collaborative work with the UK group, Subsource in 2004 to help produce, "Parasite". The track scored Subsource's first synchronisation deal – with Big Up Productions, a rock climbing video production company. Kimba later joined Subsource after Real Elements disbanded. Kimba provided the lyrics for the remixed version of "Parasite" in 2009, now called "The Reason (Parasite)". The song listed on Sky 3 channel's playlist.

== Music album ==
- The I Came E.P
- Afrikan Star [Hip HOP HEADRUSH] – 2001

=== Singles ===
- Afrikan Star
- These Elements
- The Other Side (Nokia Hype Sessions) – 2006
- Amazing [Featuring Ange] (Afrolution)- 2005
- Nyambo Anthem
