= Lawrence Mbenjere =

Malawian musician

- Born: November 15, 1975 (age 50); Chiradzulu, Malawi
- Genres: Afro-soul; Afrobeat
- Occupations: Musician songwriter producer
- Years active: 1999–present

Lawrence Mbenjere (born November 15, 1975) is a Malawian musician, songwriter, composer and producer. His breakthrough came in the late 1990s with his band Machuluka Sounds, gaining recognition for their unique fusion of traditional Malawian rhythms with modern influences. He came into public in 2005 with his debut album Ndimasilira (I wish), which had a hit Chiphaso (passport).

The album was followed by Biriwita released in 2006, Sewere (2007), Udzaleka (2009), and Khwekhwelere(2010). In 2011, Mbenjere released Kwawilira Ku Maliketi that saw large public demand. On December 29, 2009, Lawrence Mbenjere set a new record when he became the first musician in Malawi to pull home money in excess of over K2.5 million in royalties.

== Background ==
=== Early life ===
Mbenjere was born on November 15, 1975, in Chiradzulu, Malawi. He discovered his passion for music at a young age, performing at local events and gatherings. He is the founder of Mbenjere Studios Music Promotions, working with various artists such as John Malunga, Mapuyu Boys, Blessings Chimangeni, and Dustain Namakhwa. He has released several successful albums, including "Ndimasilira", "Biriwita", "Sewere", "Udzaleka", "Khwekhwelere", and "Kwawilira Ku Maliketi" that had been enjoyed radio play in Malawi as well as sales.

He has also collaborated with various artists such as Paul Banda and Katelele Ching'oma.
