= Geoffrey Zigoma =

Malawian gospel musician

- Born: August 28, 1977 (age 48); Ntcheu, Malawi
- Died: 25 October 2013 (aged 36)
- Genres: Gospel
- Occupation(s): Musician songwriter
- Years active: 1980–2013

Geoffrey Zigoma was a Malawian gospel musician and songwriter. He was the first to break local music sales’ record by selling over 100,000 copies in Malawi, but was later surpassed by Mlaka Maliro’s Dzanja Lalemba (The Hand Has Written) which sold over 131,000 copies in four months. He was also an outspoken advocate for albinos in Malawi and faced discrimination. His last album, Ndathera mwa Yesu (I have ended in Jesus), features songs that talk about his battle against skin cancer.

== Background ==
=== Early life and Death ===
Zigoma was born on August 28, 1977 in Ben Tchauya Village, Kwataine, Ntcheu. He died on October 25, 2013, at the Artemis Hospital in New Delhi, India, after a protracted battle with skin cancer.

=== Music career ===
He started singing at the age of six in the Zomba Police College CCAP Church. He started his music career in the mid-1980s and released his first album, Ndatherapano, in the early 1990s; he went on to release more albums like Nyotsonyotso, Ndazindikira, Mzungu ndi Mzungu and Nkhanza.

== See also ==
- Ethel Kamwendo Banda
