= Temwa =

Temwa may refer to:

- Temwa (charity), a British charity operating in Malawi
- Temwa (musician), Malawian musician
- Temwa Chawinga (born 1998), Malawian football player
- Temwa Chileshe (born 2000), New Zealand squash player
