= Bucci =

Bucci is an Italian surname. Notable people with the surname include:

- Bucci (Malawian singer), stage name of Mabuchi Mwale (born 1989), Malawian singer, dancer, songwriter, record producer and entrepreneur
- Alberto Bucci (1948–2019), Italian professional basketball coach
- Andrés Bucci, Chilean electronic music producer and DJ
- Andrew Bucci (1922–2014), American artist
- Annalisa Bucci (born 1983), Italian female kickboxer and mixed martial artist
- Anselmo Bucci (1887–1955), Italian artist
- Carolina Bucci (born 1976), Italian jewellery designer
- Clemar Bucci (1920–2011), Argentine Formula One driver
- Dante Bucci (1980–2014), Dutch musician
- Eugênio Bucci, Brazilian journalist
- Flavio Bucci (1947–2020), Italian actor
- George Bucci (born 1953), American professional basketball player
- Ivano Bucci (born 1986), Sammarinese sprinter
- Luca Bucci (born 1969), Italian professional football player
- Marco Bucci (1960–2013), Italian discus thrower
- Marco Bucci (politician) (born 1959), Italian politician and former pharmaceutical manager
- Mark Bucci (1924–2002), American composer and playwright
- Mary Bucci Bush (born 1949), American novelist
- Maurizio Bucci (born 1923), Italian diplomat
- Mike Bucci (born 1972), American professional wrestler
- Nick Bucci (born 1990), Canadian former professional baseball pitcher
- Nick Bucci (American football) (1932–2019), American football player
- Paolo Bucci (born 1968), Italian gymnast
- Pier Bucci, Chilean electronic music producer
- Stefania Bucci (born 1960), Italian gymnast
- Thomas W. Bucci, American attorney and the former mayor of Bridgeport, Connecticut
