= Grace Moffat Chinga =

Malawian gospel artist

Grace Chinga
- Born: Grace Chinga Moffat; 28 June 1978; Blantyre, Malawi
- Died: 17 March 2016 (aged 37)
- Genres: Gospel music
- Occupations: Musician songwriter
- Years active: 1999–2016
- Partner: Miracle Chinga

Grace Chinga Moffat or simply Grace Chinga (28 June 1978 – 17 March 2016), was a Malawian gospel singer, songwriter and vocalist. She released her debut studio album titled Uleke (Stop) in 2004 that had a hit song titled Thandizo Langa (My help) which made her gain national recognition. In 2009, Chinga released her third studio album titled Udzayimba Nyimbo (You'll sing a song) before releasing the fourth studio album titled Esther in 2016.

A book was published about Chinga soon after she died in 2016.

== Background ==
=== Early life ===
Chinga was born in Blantyre on 28 June 1978. She attended her primary and secondary school in Lilongwe.

=== Death ===
Chinga died on Wednesday of 16 March 2016 after a short illness as reported by Chris Suya, the husband of the gospel artist, Thoko Suya. She was confirmed dead upon arrival at Queen Elizabeth Hospital in Blantyre. After Chinga's death, thousand of people attended the funeral ceremony and some gathered at her family's house in Chilobwe. She was buried at HHI Cemetery in Blantyre but the funeral ceremony was held at Robin's Park. Her funeral ceremony was covered by major media houses in Malawi including Zodiak Broadcasting Station, Times group, Malawi Broadcasting Cooperation, National Publications Limited Joy Radio, MIJ FM, Capital radio. Some of the notable high-profile people that paid their condolences to the family of Chinga included former President of Malawi, Peter Mutharika, as well as former president, Joyce Banda. Other notable figures were the former Minister of Sports and Culture of Malawi, Grace Chiumia and the president of Musicians Union of Malawi, Chiwemmwe Mhango. Other artists that attended the funeral included Princess Chitsulo, Billy Kaunda and Lucius Banda among others.

==== Aftermath ====
Soon after Chinga's death, many musicians in Malawi started changing, dubbing and copying her music style and songs, modifying where possible. After matters where reported to the authorities that were responsible to handle the issues, there were some challenges that occurred as Chinga had not assign her music yet to the country's copyright protection organisation, COSOMA. Senior licensing officer, Rosario Kamanga, said that she told Chinga to register her songs to the organisation but Chinga had not yet decided.

In October 2021, Chinga's tombstone was vandalised at Henry Henderson Institute (HHI) cemetery in Blantyre.

=== Music career ===
Chinga started her music career in 1998 when she was in the choir group called All Angels Choir where she provided the lead vocals.

== Personal life ==
Chinga was married to Rodger Moffat, who died in June 2019 at the aged of 53. Together, they are survived by three children, names Steve Spesho, Miracle Chinga and Israel chinga who are also gospel singers.

== See also ==
- Princess Chitsulo
- Thoko Katimba
