= Temwa (musician) =

Malawian singer-songwriter and performer

- Born: Temwa Gondwe; September 22, 1996; Rumphi, Malawi
- Origin: Rumphi, Malawi
- Genres: Afro-soul, R&B, pop
- Occupations: Singer-songwriter, performer
- Instrument: Vocals
- Years active: 2018–present
- Label: Independent

Temwa Gondwe (born 22 September 1996), known professionally as Temwa, is a Malawian Afro-soul and R&B singer-songwriter. She rose to national prominence with the release of singles such as Malawi and No Size, and has been recognized as one of the leading female voices in Malawi’s contemporary music industry.

== Early life and education ==
Temwa was born in Mwazisi, Rumphi, Northern Malawi, on 22 September 1996, in a Tumbuka family. She grew up in a musical family and began performing at local talent shows during her teenage years.

== Career ==
Temwa’s professional breakthrough came in 2018 with the single Malawi, a track that gained radio airplay and was praised for its soulful delivery. She followed it with songs including No Size and Sindingakwanitse, cementing her style as a blend of Afro-soul, R&B, and pop.

She has collaborated with artists such as Sangie, Tay Grin, and Keturah, appearing at festivals and women’s empowerment events. In 2025 she worked with Lawi to create the single “Makolo Ndi”. At the start of 2026 it was reported that she intended to take a break and she would not be performing until the end of the year.

== Recognition ==
Temwa was highlighted by Nyasa Times as one of Malawi’s rising female musicians to watch in 2017. She is part of a wave of young Malawian musicians contributing to the growth of Afro-soul and contemporary R&B in the country.

== Discography ==
=== Selected singles ===
- Malawi (2018)
- No Size (2019)
- Sindingakwanitse (2020)
