= Malawi Music Awards =

Awards event in Malawi

- Current: 2024 Malawi Music Awards
- Awarded for: Outstanding work in the Malawian music industry
- Country: Malawi
- Presented by: Malawi
- First award: 2001; 25 years ago

The Malawi Music Awards are Malawian national awards that stands as an annual hallmark event within Malawi's music industry that recognizes and celebrates outstanding achievements in the Malawian music industry. The event is organized by the Music Association of Malawi (MAM) and is considered one of the most prestigious music awards in the country. During its establishments in the early 1990s, the awards had been primary aiming at recognizing and honouring the contributions of Malawian musicians towards the advancement and enrichment of the nation's music scene. The events serve as a platform to celebrate the talents and achievements of Malawian artists who have played vital roles in shaping and expanding the local music.

The events are held every end of the year usually in November or December.

== History ==
The inaugural ceremony in 1990 was held in Lilongwe, the capital of Malawi.

=== Nomination Process ===
The nomination process typically starts with a call for entries, where artists and industry professionals submit their work for consideration. A panel of judges then reviews the submissions and selects the top nominees in each category.

== Awards categories ==
The awards feature various categories, including:

=== Artist of the Year ===
The Artist of the Year award is the highest and most prestigious of the awards given at the event.

- Best Male Artist
- Best Female Artist
- Best Group/Duo
- Best Newcomer
- Best Album
- Best Song
- Best Music Video
- Best Producer
- Best Traditional Artist
- Best Gospel Artist
- Best Hip-Hop/Rap Artist
- Best R&B/Pop Artist

==== Voting Process ====
After the nominees are announced, the public can vote for their favorite artists and songs through various channels, such as SMS, online voting, or social media.

== Awards ceremony ==
The awards ceremony typically takes place in May or June and features live performances by nominated artists, special guests, and presentations of awards to the winners.

=== Notable recipients ===
Some notable winners of the Malawi Music Awards include:

- Bucci (Best R&B/Pop Artist)
- Tay Grin (Best Hip-Hop/Rap Artist)
- Namadingo (Best Male Artist)
- Zani Challe (Best Female Artist)

== Trophy ==
The MAMU Awards has been awarding its winners and nominees in different forms over the past years. The awards usually give its winners a golden star plaque.

== Locations ==
The inaugural ceremony in 1990 was held in Lilongwe, the capital of Malawi.

== See also ==
- List of Malawian awards
