= Amos Msekandiana =

Malawian paediatric endocrinologist, hospital administrator and actor

- Born: 8 May 1983 (age 42); Malawi
- Education: University of Malawi
- Occupations: Paediatrician; Paediatric endocrinologist; Hospital director; Actor
- Employer(s): Kamuzu Central Hospital; Baylor College of Medicine Children’s Foundation Malawi
- Known for: First paediatric endocrinologist in Malawi; Lead actor in Welcome to Maula Prison

Amos Msekandiana is a Malawian paediatrician, paediatric-endocrinologist and film actor. He currently serves as Hospital Director of Kamuzu Central Hospital (KCH) in Lilongwe. He also holds a leadership role at Baylor College of Medicine Children's Foundation Malawi (Baylor Malawi), where he has acted as medical director. He earned a Bachelor of Medicine and Surgery from the College of Medicine, University of Malawi, later obtaining a Master of Medicine in Paediatric Medicine and a Postgraduate Diploma in Tropical Medicine.

He is also a Fellow of the Pediatric Endocrinology Training Center for Africa (PECTA), reflecting advanced training in paediatric endocrinology.

== Medical and research contributions ==
Msekandiana has been actively involved in paediatric and endocrinology services in Malawi, combining clinical work with broader public-health and research roles. For instance, he is listed among key specialists in the national Non-Communicable Diseases (NCD) guideline project for child health under the national guidelines development initiative.

He is also lead (corresponding) author of a peer-reviewed study, “Complications and Glycaemic Control of Type 1 Diabetes Mellitus amongst Children Aged 5 to 19 Years Attending Diabetic Clinic at Kamuzu Central Hospital in Malawi”. This study - published in the International Journal of Diabetes and Clinical Research - sheds light on glycaemic control, occurrence of diabetic ketoacidosis and hypoglycaemia among children and adolescents with Type 1 diabetes at KCH, addressing a previously under-documented area in Malawi.

He routinely participates in national health-system strengthening efforts; for example, he attended a 2025 workshop on research methodology and grant writing at KCH organized by the Public Health Institute of Malawi (PHIM) in collaboration with Kamuzu University of Health Sciences (KUHeS), where he was explicitly named among participants.

== Acting career ==
Outside medicine, Msekandiana gained public recognition through acting. Under the screen name (or popularly known as) “Jaliwa”, he plays the lead role in the 2025 film Welcome to Maula Prison, produced by 4Kaya Films. In the film, he portrays “Jaliwa”, a character who becomes wrongly accused and imprisoned under systemic injustices - a narrative that resonates with social issues and reflects a dramatic, socially conscious cinematic vision.

The movie premiered in Malawi in May 2025 and achieved significant audience attention. It was later screened in South Africa, broadening its reach beyond Malawi.

Media coverage of his appointment as KCH Director explicitly references this acting background, calling him "Dr. Msekandiana", popularly known as Jaliwa from the movie Welcome to Maula Prison.

== Personal life ==
Msekandiana is known publicly not only for his medical career but also for his acting work. Using the screen name Jaliwa, he starred in the 2025 Malawian feature film Welcome to Maula Prison, where he played the lead role. The film's themes of injustice and imprisonment brought him additional public recognition, and its screenings in Malawi and South Africa expanded his visibility beyond the health sector.

== Filmography ==
=== Film ===
Year	Title	Role	Notes
2021	Highbrow	TBA	
2023	Misnomer	TBA	
2025	Welcome to Maula Prison	Jaliwa	Lead role

=== Television ===
Year	Title	Role	Notes
2024	Mushroom Shade	Phillip	Lead role
2025	Pa Mango Lodge	TBA	

== Awards and nominations ==
Year	Award	Category	Work	Result	Ref
2025	Maso Awards	Best Actor	Welcome to Maula Prison	Won	
2025	Malawi Film Awards & Gala	Best Actor	Welcome to Maula Prison	Won	
