= Pop Young =

Malawian musician

- Born: Vitumbiko Chisoni; March 2, 2004 (age 22); Mzimba, Malawi
- Other name: Popizo
- Occupations: Singer; songwriter; rapper; dancer
- Years active: 2016–present
- Musical career
- Genres: R&B; hip hop; pop
- Instrument: Vocals
- Label: Akometsi

Vitumbiko Chisoni (born March 2, 2004), best known as Pop Young, is a Malawian Afro-Pop singer and songwriter. In 2022, he won a Mzuzu Music Award as the best male artist of the year. Chisoni's most popular songs include "Collect," "Mesa," "Sole," and "Story," among others that brought him popularity and recognition national wide.

He is widely known for his unique fusion of Tumbuka, English and Chewa in his compositions. He was signed and managed by the Akometsi, a company based in the capital of Malawi, Lilongwe.

== Background ==
=== Early life ===
Chisoni was born on March 2, 2004, in Mzimba District, in the city of Mzuzu. He is a Tumbuka by tribe. He completed his primary schooling in Mzuzu as well as his secondary school education.

=== Music career ===
Chisoni entered in the music industry when he recorded his first song in 2016 titled "Ndikusowa" (I am missing you). Since then, he had been sending some of his songs to different radio stations. In 2021, he released a few videos that he launched in Mzuzu, alongside Piksy. His song titled "Story" got nominated as well as won a Mzuzu Music Awards. Chisoni sites Mikozi, Mafumu, Makosana, and Kelvin Sulugwe, among others for supporting and sponsoring his music

== Achievements ==
=== Mzuzu Music Awards (Mpoto Awards) ===
Year	Nominee / work	Award	Result
2022	Himself	Best Artist of the Year	Won
2022	Sole	Best Music Video of Year 2022	Won

=== Maso Awards ===
Year	Nominee / work	Award	Result
2023	Himself	Best Artist of the Year	Won

=== MBC Awards ===
Year	Nominee / work	Award	Result
2023	Himself	Best Artist of the Year	Won

== See also ==
- Music of Malawi
- Sangie
