= Welcome to Maula Prison =

2025 Malawian film

- Theatrical release poster
- Directed by: Bester Kauwa
- Written by: Lawlence Nyale; Kendall Kamwendo
- Produced by: Lawlence Nyale; Kendall Kamwendo
- Starring: Kendall Kamwendo; Amos Msekandiana
- Cinematography: Georgiz Nyale
- Distributed by: 4Kaya Films
- Release date: 2 May 2025
- Running time: 115 minutes
- Country: Malawi
- Languages: Chichewa; Chitumbuka
- Budget: 40 million Kwacha

Welcome to Maula Prison is a Malawian drama film that premiered in May 2025, directed by Bester Kauwa. The film tells the story of Jaliwa, played by Amos Msekandiana, who becomes wrongly accused and imprisoned in Maula Prison after being betrayed his friend in a corrupt foreign exchange deal. The film is in two former Malawian major official languages, Chichewa and Chitumbuka, with embedded English subtitles. It also features some scenes of Swahili and English.

== Plot ==
The film follows Jaliwa's journey as he goes through the harsh realities of life inside Maula Prison. The prison is depicted as a place of confinement and a symbol of wider societal issues such as injustice and overcrowding, as well as human neglect. With bad living conditions and limited access to medical care, as well as a strict inmate hierarchy, Jaliwa must confront the brutal truths of prison life while fighting to maintain his dignity and hope.

== Cast ==
- Amos Msekandiana as Jaliwa
- Wanangwa Gondwe as Sibweni
- Kendall Kamwendo as (S.O) Mndolera
- Desire Namachotsa as Mrs Jaliwa
- Innocent Manyera as Nikalagwa
- Tumpe Mtaya as Phwedo
- Sophie Mponda as Angellina Jaliwa

== Release ==
The film premiered in Malawian major cities such as Lilongwe, Blantyre and Mzuzu, on 2–4 May 2025. The movie broke box office records as the first locally produced film to sell out venues in the country.

== Reception ==
The film received widespread acclaim and sparked discussions on social media, with audiences and critics praising its bold portrayal of Malawian realities.

=== Accolades ===
Accolades received by Welcome to Maula Prison
Award	Date of ceremony	Category	Recipient(s)	Result	Ref.
Maso Awards	13 December 2025	Best Actor	Amos Msekandiana	Won	
Maso Awards	13 December 2025	Best Feature Film	Welcome to Maula Prison	Won	
Malawi Film Awards & Gala	19 December 2025	Best Feature Film	Welcome to Maula Prison	Won	
Malawi Film Awards & Gala	19 December 2025	Best Film Production Company	4Kaya Films	Won	
Malawi Film Awards & Gala	19 December 2025	Best Upcoming Actress	Mzati Muheziwa	Won	
Malawi Film Awards & Gala	19 December 2025	Best Upcoming Actor	Blessings Mwambo	Won	
Malawi Film Awards & Gala	19 December 2025	Best Supporting Actor	Blessings Mwambo	Won	
Malawi Film Awards & Gala	19 December 2025	Best Supporting Actress	Sophie Mponda	Nominated	
Malawi Film Awards & Gala	19 December 2025	Best Actress	Michelle Chirwa	Won	
Malawi Film Awards & Gala	19 December 2025	Best Actor	Amos Msekandiana	Won	
Malawi Film Awards & Gala	19 December 2025	Best Actor	Wanangwa Gondwe	Nominated	
Malawi Film Awards & Gala	19 December 2025	Best Film Costume Designer	Desire Namachotsa	Won	
Malawi Film Awards & Gala	19 December 2025	Best Cinematographer	Georjiz Nyale	Won	
Malawi Film Awards & Gala	19 December 2025	Best Actor (Special Award)	Eugene Madede	Won	
