= Alleluya Band =

Band in Malawi

Alleluya Band is a Malawian music group founded by Paul Banda and his brother Lucius Banda from Balaka. The band rose to fame in 1970s. The band's current leader is Coss Chiwalo. In 2021, the group released their 13th album. In 2018 and 2019, the band visited Rome and met with Pope Francis for Panama for World Youth Day. In 2020, after the band embarked from Italy, they were quarantined due to COVID-19. The band has shared stage with Skeffa Chimoto and Dan Lufani.
