= Mushroom Shade =

Malawian television drama series

- Genre: Drama
- Created by: Chaz Munthali
- Directed by: Chaz Munthali
- Starring: Amos Msekandiana; Fortunata Mkawa; Mwai Simbota; Cynthia Zondi Zulu; Bucci Mwale
- Country of origin: Malawi
- Original language: English
- No. of seasons: 1
- No. of episodes: 5

Production
- Executive producers: Ben Wandawanda; Khumbo Munthali
- Producer: Jiran Milambe
- Cinematography: Essim Mbwana
- Editor: Essim Mbwana
- Production company: Chaz Production

Original release
- Release: April 21, 2024 – present

Mushroom Shade is a Malawian television drama series that premiered in April 2024. The series is part of a growing wave of locally produced television content in Malawi and has attracted attention for its storytelling, production quality, and contribution to the country's film and television industry.

== Background and production ==
Mushroom Shade was produced by Chaz Production, led by Malawian filmmaker Chaz Munthali. The series was developed as a locally driven drama aimed at reflecting contemporary Malawian social realities, particularly issues surrounding family, inheritance, relationships, and gender dynamics. Media coverage has identified the series as an example of increasing professionalisation within Malawi's television production sector.

The production has been cited by local commentators as part of a broader resurgence of interest in Malawian film and television, alongside other emerging drama series and creative projects.

== Synopsis ==
The series follows the lives of several women whose personal relationships and futures become entangled following family conflicts and disputes over inheritance. Through its narrative, Mushroom Shade explores themes of loyalty, betrayal, ambition, and the social pressures faced by women within modern Malawian society.

== Cast and characters ==
Mushroom Shade features a cast drawn largely from Malawi's local creative and entertainment industry. Media reports have highlighted the involvement of musicians and emerging actors, noting this crossover as a growing trend within the country's television landscape.

Actor	Character	Description
Amos Msekandiana	Phillip Sani	A married man struggling with infertility; central to the series’ marital conflict storyline.
Fortunata Mkawa	Angella Sani	Phillip's wife, who navigates challenges in her marriage and emotional turmoil.
Mwai Simbota	Yakosa	A single woman who enjoys dating but grapples with relationships and attitudes toward marriage.
Cynthia Zondi Zulu	Lissy	Yakosa's sister, openly involved in transactional relationships; her storyline explores survival and attraction.
Bucci Mwale	Walezi	A taxi driver who becomes romantically linked with Lissy; noted for his charismatic portrayal.
Francis “Ace Dirty” Vassilatos	Jonah	Portrays a character whose relationships and behaviour provoke discussion among viewers.
Ben Sam	Dr Megi	Supporting character appearing across multiple storylines.
William “Episodz” Phoya	Fred	Supporting character featured in key episodes of the series.
Patrick Mhango	Maurice	Supporting character contributing to the ensemble cast.

== Episodes ==
Season	Episodes	Originally released	
Season	Episodes	First released	Last released
1	5	April 21, 2024	August 5, 2024

=== Season 1 (2024) ===
No. overall	No. in season	Directed by	Written by	Original release date
1	1	Chaz Munthali	Chaz Munthali	April 21, 2024
The series premiere introduces the intertwined lives of Yosa, Angela, and Lissy as they face deception and trauma. Yosa's blind date is ruined when she discovers her partner faked his mother's death to gain her sympathy, while her sister Angela reveals a past abortion during a heated argument with her husband over their fertility struggles. Simultaneously, their niece Lissy forms a bond with a philosophical taxi driver who challenges her views on wealth and happiness. The episode ends on a harrowing note when Yosa is physically and sexually assaulted by a childhood friend, Jonah, after he becomes irrationally jealous during a night out.
2	2	Chaz Munthali	Chaz Munthali	April 29, 2024
The story intensifies as Philip, desperate to continue his family bloodline despite his infertility, pressures his wife Angela into a controversial arrangement. He convinces his cousin Maurice to sleep with Angela for the sole purpose of conception, a plan that deeply disturbs Angela and highlights Philip's obsession with legacy over her well-being. Meanwhile, Yosa struggles with the trauma of her recent assault and visits a gynecologist, only to be met by a new, unsettling doctor, Megi, who notes signs of rough penetration, further compounding her distress. The episode concludes with the uncomfortable execution of Philip's plan, leaving the characters grappling with the moral and emotional consequences of their choices.
3	3	Chaz Munthali	Chaz Munthali	June 30, 2024
The sisters Yosa, Angela, and Lissy celebrate a sudden inheritance while navigating their increasingly complex personal lives. Angela faces intense emotional manipulation from Philip, who becomes obsessed with the details of her encounter with his cousin Maurice and later resorts to performance-enhancing supplements in a desperate bid to reassert his masculinity and satisfy her. Meanwhile, Yosa attempts to move forward by going on a date with Dr. Megi, only to be confronted by Fred the man who previously lied about his mother's death; who surprisingly turns out to be Megi's brother and a changed man. Lissy experiences a bout of jealousy when she finds a female neighbor in Walezi’s taxi, prompting a realization about her growing feelings for him despite her earlier transactional views on relationships.
4	4	Chaz Munthali	Chaz Munthali	July 8, 2024
The sister's lives are further complicated by the arrival of their long-absent eldest sister, Ernestine, whose return coincides with the finalization of their father's estate. The episode reveals a shocking back-story: Ernestine is actually Lissy's biological mother, having manipulated a gardener named Steve into a relationship years ago to avoid trouble, only to abandon Lissy with their father. Meanwhile, Yosa rekindles a romance with an old flame, Boston, who believes their reunion is divinely ordained after his return from Kenya. However, the most scandalous development occurs when Angela, unable to stop thinking about her encounter with Maurice, invites him back to her home. Despite Philip's strict orders to stay away, Angela and Maurice give in to their mutual attraction, signaling a deeper betrayal of Philip's trust.
5	5	Chaz Munthali	Chaz Munthali	August 5, 2024
The emotional stakes for the sisters reach a breaking point as secrets and tragedies unfold. Lissy finally ends her transactional relationship with her "blesser", choosing instead to follow her heart and pursue a genuine relationship with Walezi, who confesses his love for her after his mother encourages him to take his chance. Angela’s reckless affair with Maurice continues, leading to a tense moment when she almost catches Maurice with another woman, only to realize the depth of her own betrayal when she finds Philip's cousin is truly single and unattached. Meanwhile, Yosa’s newfound happiness with Boston is shattered when she discovers he has fallen into a coma; while visiting his home, she meets his sister and learns that he had been planning to propose to her, leaving her devastated and questioning her luck in love.

== Broadcast and release ==
The series premiered in April 2024 and has been distributed through Malawian television platforms and online streaming services. It has reached audiences both within Malawi and among Malawians in the diaspora through digital distribution.

In October 2025, it was announced that South African actor Victor Ivyic had been added to the cast for the second season and had completed filming his scenes in Blantyre.

== Reception ==
Critical reception within Malawian media has been generally positive. A review published by Nyasa Times praised the series for its dialogue, character development, and improvement in production standards compared to earlier local television dramas. The review described Mushroom Shade as a significant step forward for locally produced series.

Other commentators have noted the series' cultural relevance and its role in demonstrating the viability of Malawian television productions competing for audience attention in a market dominated by foreign content.
