= Ruth Kulaisi =

Malawian talk show host

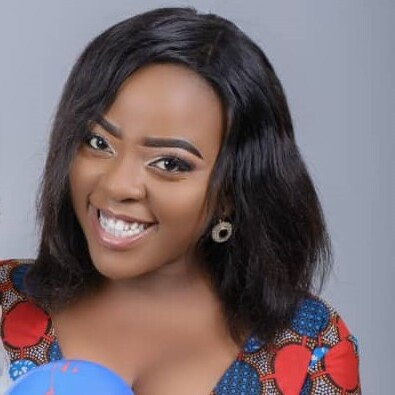
- Other names: Ruth Kulaisi-Chikoleka
- Education: Global Heart Leadership College
- Occupations: TV presenter and talk show host
- Employer: Zodiak Broadcasting Station
- Spouse: Phyzix

Ruth Kulaisi became Ruth Kulaisi-Chikoleka is a Malawian talk show host and TV presenter. She was the Airtel Trace Music Star in 2016 and the MISA Talk Show Host of the year in 2019.

== Life ==
Kulaisi comes from the village of Kahumbe, Masasa, Ntcheu which is 50 miles from Lilongwe. She was the first child born to Douglas and Margaret Kulaisi and in time she had a sister and a brother.

She learned about pastoral care in Perth in Australia where she sang and published an album of gospel music. She studied at the Global Heart Leadership College in Perth's suburb of Joondalup, before she worked for the Zodiak Broadcasting Station which is based in Lilongwe.

In June 2016 she was the Malawian contestant at the Pan-African Airtel Trace Music Star contest having won the 2nd Airtel Trace Music Star in May.

In 2019 she won the Radio Talk Show Host of the Year at that year's MISA-Malawi media awards. The award were sponsored by the US Embassy,

In 2022 she went to South Africa to receive an award from Women With a Mission Recognition and Achievement Awards (WWMRA) for her "exceptional role in the media space".

She was nominated for both radio and TV personality of the year in 2024.

== Private life ==
Kulaisi married Noel Chikoleka, better known by his stage name Phyzix, in 2016 and the couple had a daughter in the following year.
