= Harry Thomson (politician) =

Malawian politician (1934–2019)

Harry Thomson (1934 – 6 June 2019), also known as "Clean Harry", was a Malawian politician. He was born in Zomba, the capital of Nyasaland (present day Malawi). He was a founding member of the United Democratic Front party (UDF) and a Minister of Trade and Industry.

== Personal life ==
He was born to a family of 5 children. He had a Scottish grandfather and African, black grandmother, so the family referred to themselves as EuroAfrican which was the fashion of the time. His stern religious parents sent him to boarding school in Rhodesia from primary school to secondary school in hopes that he would join the medical profession. As a Boy Scout in secondary school he gained interest and experience in working with the people of community. He returned to Malawi in 1950 and began work as a motor mechanic and ran his own business for a few years. He soon became interested in Management and studied management.

He was grandfather to Theo Thomson.

== Public service and UDF foundation ==
He was elected Chairman of the National Chamber of Commerce of Malawi for 10 years and was also Chairman of the Southern Regional Business Council for 6 years. As Chairman of the local Chamber of Commerce he traveled and was part of an underground movement that included Bakili Muluzi that aimed at resisting the one-party rule of Kamuzu Banda. Muluzi was heading the Transport Association, and had become a chamber member after leaving Kamuzu Banda's cabinet. The chamber became the foundation of the UDF. They began to agitate the MCP government under growing protests nationwide over Banda's reign and this resulted in associates being arrested or sent away. Protests after Banda agreed to a national referendum to see if the present government, a one-party state, should be continued or to go into multi-party. He traveled the country telling people the advantages of multi-party as opposed to the disadvantages prior to the 1994 elections. In May 1994, elections were won by the UDF, with Bakili Muluzi as the first democratic president of Malawi.

== Political career ==
He was one of the founding members of the UDF. After The Muluzi government won the elections, Thomson served as the Minister of Trade and Industry and Minister for Natural Resources and Environmental Affairs. Thomson served UDF for 17 years and stood for parliament in Chikwawa North.

After unanimous verdict by the UDF party's National Executive Committee (NEC) that Thomson take over the chairmanship of the party, Muluzi decided to override the decision. Thomson resigned from UDF in 2004 in protest over the nomination of President Bingu wa Mutharika joining the NDA. By May 2009, he resigned from active politics in Malawi.

== Death ==
Thomson died in Johannesburg, South Africa on 6 June 2019.
