= Home Grown African =

Malawian hip hop duo

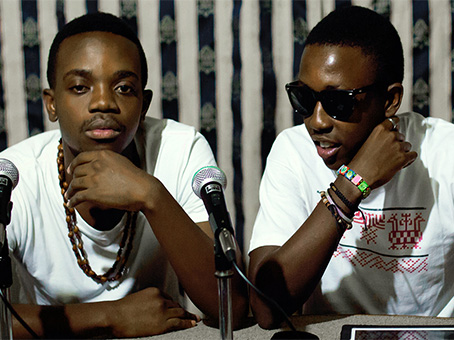
- Joy FM Interview with Home Grown African

Background information
- Origin: Blantyre, Malawi
- Genres: Hip hop
- Years active: 2009-present
- Labels: Independent
- Members: Hayze Engola (Sindiso Casper Msungama); Classick (Yankho Ackson Zulu)

Home Grown African (sometimes HGA) is a Malawian hip hop duo based in Blantyre, Malawi. The group consists of artists Classick and Hayze Engolah. Known for songs including "T.I.A." and "Radio" they are one of Malawi's best-regarded rap acts.

The group performed at Lake of Stars Festival in 2014 and headlined the 4th UMP Music festival in November 2015. They also partnered with Coca-Cola for the 2015 Kuphaka Life College Campus Tour.

Home Grown African released Blantyre Blues EP in December 2015.

== Discography ==
- Blantyre Blues EP (2015)

== See also ==
- Music of Malawi
- African hip-hop
