= Gospel Kazako =

Broadcasting entrepreneur, Malawian Minister of Information

- Born: December 29, 1968 (age 56)
- Occupations: Poet; Voice actor; Broadcasting executive

Gospel Kazako (born 29 December 1968) is a Malawian entrepreneur who in 2005 founded the Zodiak Broadcasting Station, the most popular radio station in Malawi. He is also known as a poet.

In July 2020 Gospel Kazako was appointed as Minister of Information and Government spokesperson by the newly elected Malawian President Lazarus Chakwera.

Gospel Kazako was brought up in the southern Malawian town of Zomba, the eldest of eight children whose father was a watchman. He attended H.H.I. Secondary School in Blantyre until 1990. After obtaining a diploma in journalism, for seven years he worked at the state-owned Malawi Broadcasting Corporation (MBC), before leaving to form his own company to record music, soundtracks and adverts for other radio stations. Finally, after several attempts to obtain a licence, he opened Zodiak Broadcasting Station (ZBS) in 2005. Zodiak Broadcasting Station currently has over 25 transmitting sites and covers the whole of Malawi. The station was awarded a licence to broadcast TV in 2012.
