= Miracle Chinga =

Malawian gospel singer and songwriter

- Born: 13 September 1998 (age 27); Malawi
- Origin: Blantyre, Malawi
- Genres: Gospel, Contemporary Christian music
- Occupation(s): Singer, songwriter
- Years active: 2017–present
- Labels: Alobodo Records

Miracle Chinga (born 13 September 1998) is a Malawian gospel singer and songwriter. In 2024, she won a Maso Music awards title as gospel artist of the year. She is the second-born daughter of the late gospel artist Grace Chinga.

== Early life and background ==
Chinga was born in Malawi and grew up in a Christian household. Influenced by her mother Grace Chinga, she committed to gospel music after her mother's death in 2016.

== Music career ==
She began releasing music around 2017 with early singles such as "Hossanah", "Ndiyemwe Uja" and "Mwapambana". Later releases include "Thamanga (Never Give Up)", "M’modzi", "Mchipululu", "Kubadwa Kwa Yesu" and "Mfumu Ya Mafumu". In 2024 she collaborated with Evance Meleka on the song "Mseri".

== Awards and recognitions ==
In 2023 Chinga won the MBC Best Female Gospel Artist of the Year award. In 2024 she was honored with both MBC Entertainer of Entertainers of the Year and another Best Female Gospel Artist title.

== Discography ==
=== Selected singles ===
- Hossanah
- Ndiyemwe Uja
- Mwapambana
- Thamanga (Never Give Up)
- M’modzi
- Mchipululu
- Kubadwa Kwa Yesu
- Mfumu Ya Mafumu
- Mseri" (feat. Evance Meleka)
