= Bucci (Malawian singer) =

Malawian musician

Mabuchi Mwale
- Born: November 28, 1989 (age 36); Blantyre, Malawi
- Genres: RnB
- Occupations: Musician songwriter actor
- Years active: 2008–present

Mabuchi Mwale, better known by his stage name Bucci or acting name Bucci Mwale, is a Malawian singer, dancer, songwriter, record producer, actor and entrepreneur. He was also featured on BBC Africa’s ‘Focus on Africa’. He is known for his unique R&B style and dance moves.

== Early life ==
Mwale was born and raised in Blantyre where he started his musical journey. He is a Tumbuka by tribe and his parents are from the Northern Region of Malawi but had since left the place for work to the Southern Region where Mwale was born.

== Music career ==
Growing up in a musically inclined family, Mwale was exposed to various genres of music from an early age, which significantly influenced his development. His mother, a singer in her family choir, played a crucial role in nurturing his musical interests . He began his musical journey by playing drums in a church band and later joined the group BBM CLIQUE, where he honed his skills and eventually became a part of Ndefeyo Entertainment. As his confidence grew, he started performing at numerous gigs, showcasing his unique style, which blended traditional Afropop and R&B with a modern twist.

He released his first single Maluno and second single Muyaya in 2015.

As a producer, he has produced several songs such as Golide, Undigwile (ft. Tuno), Gijima (ft. Zani Challe), Ndagoma (ft. Fredokiss), Wofo, Apapa, Umbombo and Zitiyendera.

In 2015, he was the youngest nominee in the best R&B category for the Music Malawi Awards (MUMA).

== Acting career ==
He has appeared in 2021 film Highbrow, 2023 film Misnomer and 2024 TV series Mushroom Shade as a taxi driver.
