= Thoko Katimba =

Malawian gospel artist

- Born: Thoko Katimba; June 25, 1985 (age 41); Yamwala Village, Traditional Authority Wimbe; Kasungu District, Malawi
- Genres: Gospel music
- Occupations: Musician songwriter businessman accountant
- Years active: 1999–present
- Spouse: Maggie Katimba (died 2013)
- Partner: Miracle Chinga

Thoko Katimba, also spelled Thocco Katimba, is a Malawian gospel singer, songwriter and businessman. He released his first debut song in 1999 titled Asayansi bodza (scientists are liers) that gained him national recognition. He released his first debut album titled Unasankha Ndani (whom did you chose) and this was the album the audience mistook his voice and name for a lady.

Katimba has collaborated with different gospel artists.

== Background ==
=== Early life ===
Katimba was born on 15 December 1980 in Yamwala Village, Traditional authority Wimbe in Kasungu District. Katimba is the member of assemblies of God Church.

=== Music career ===
Katimba started his music career when he used to sing in the choir. Since then, he has been in gospel music industry for over 24 years. He released his first debut song in 1999 titled Asayansi bodza (scientists are liers). He released his second hit song in 2000. In 2005, Katimba released his first debut album titled Unasankha Ndani (whom did you chose) and this was the album the audience mistook his voice and name for a lady.

Katimba's hit songs include Ndipatseni yankho (Give me an answer), Usalire tonthola (Stop crying) and Please forgive. In 2008, Katimba went on releasing his second studio album titled Werenga Madalitso ako (count your blessings) which featured great hits such as Ambuye ndiribe nanu mawu (God I am speechless), and Mulendo akamabwera (when a visitor comes) The album was the best selling for the period of over 2 years at O.G Issa Malawi, as well as its official launch at French Cultural Centre. Then, it was named the record breaking show of the year. In 2010, Katimba released another album titled Ndidzaimabe (I will still stand) which had hits such as parabolical Anaphiri (Miss Phiri), Undipatse mpata (Give me a chance), and Undilonderanji (Why are you following me), as well as many other tracks.

In 2013, Katimba released his fourth studio successful album titled Nthambi (good seeds) which had hits such as Mwasintha nyengo zanga (You have changed my timess (Lord)), and Usatukwane Mulungu (Don't swear God) and Misonzi ya Chimwemwe (Tears of joy).

It was in 2015 that Katimba released his other parabolic studio album titled Bakha (Duck). The album carried hits such as Bakha and Ndakhululuka (I have forgiven you).

In 2021, he released his sixth album titled Mukusangalatsa ndani? (Whom are you pleasing?). The abulm featured songs such as Dikilirabe (keep waiting) and many other. Katimba was born in a God fearing family of five children. As a businessman, Katimba owns an investment called TK Investment. Besides singing and being the founder of his investment, Katimba is also a professional accountant.

Katimba has collaborated with various artists such as Ethel Kamwendo Banda and Grace Chinga.

== Personal life ==
Katimba was married and lost his wife, Maggie Katimba, on 8 January 2013. In 2016, he spoke out on reports that he impregnated the daughter, Miracle Chinga, of the late gospel singer, Grace Chinga.

== See also ==
- Grace Chinga Moffat
- Paul Banda
- Sangie
