= Princess Chitsulo =

Malawian gospel artist

- Born: Princess Chitsulo; January 1, 1981 (age 45); Chiradzulu, Malawi
- Genres: Gospel music
- Occupations: Musician songwriter businesswoman
- Years active: 2000–present
- Spouse: Albert Nyasulu (died)

Mizaya Princess Chitsulo (born January 1, 1981), best known as Princess Chitsulo, is a Malawian gospel singer, activist and businesswoman. In 2001, she was honored an award for Best Female Vocalist in the Malawi Gin Competition. In 2014, she also got awarded as best female artist and her song titled Ndidzayimba Nyimbo (I will sing a song) was voted as the best song of the year.

In 2016, Chitsulo was awarded as best female artist in Magic Promotions. In 2018, she was awarded as best female artist in Charitable issues.

Chitsulo is also a founder of a charitable organization known as Princess Chitsulo Foundation established in December 2014 with an aim to help out the elderly, the poor and vulnerable children in Malawi.

== Background ==
=== Early life ===
Chitsulo was born on 1 January 1981 in Chiradzulu District to a businessman and traditional leader, Raiden Chitsulo, and Angellina Makatanje. She has three siblings namely Tina, Margaret and Grace. Her mother died when she was young and could barely remember her. When she was 12 years old, she lost her father. Together with her siblings, they relocated to their home village before permanently moving to Blantyre to stay with relatives.

==== Education ====
She did her Secondary School education at Chiradzulu Secondary School, as well as at Chichiri Secondary School. She did for a marketing course at Lehlonolo Business College but did not complete due to lack of financial support.

===== Heath problems =====
In 2000, Chitsulo developed Meningitis and she was admitted at Queen Elizabeth Hospital. In 2014, she was diagnosed with a heart condition and was taken to South Africa for better treatment. Former presidents of Malawi both Peter Mutharika and Joyce Banda offered financial assistance for Chitsulo to travel and get treatment in South Africa.

== Music career ==
Chitsulo started singing in early 2000s and she released her first studio album in 2000. In 2015, Chitsulo released her debut second studio album titled Mavutowa Akadzatha (when problems end). In 2016, she released her third studio album Nyimbo Yanga (My song) which carried the hit Chenjera Peturo (Be careful Petros). In 2023, Chitsulo released her fourth studio album titled Nsembe (Sacrifice).

Chitsulo has collaborated and shared stage with different renowned gospel artist in the country such as Thoko Katimba, Ethel Kand the Great Angels Choir, among others.

=== Activist ===
As the founder of her own charitable organization, Chitsulo had been reported helping people with albinism in the country. She donated K24,000 for banana business of an albino, Constance Msiska in Mzuzu.

== Achievements ==
=== Magic Promotions ===
Year	Nominee / work	Award	Result
2018	Herself	Best Gospel Act	Won

=== MUMA Awards ===
Year	Nominee / work	Award	Result
2014	Herself	Best Female Artist	Won
2014	Ndidzayimba Nyimbo (I will sing a song)	Best Song of the Year	Won

=== Malawi Gin Competition ===
Year	Nominee / work	Award	Result
2001	Herself	Best Female Vocalist	Won

== Personal life ==
Chitsulo was married to the late Albert Nyasulu who died six months prior to her wedding he passed. She has a daughter named Sarah who is 20.
