= Maskal, Chitradurga =

Maskal
- village
- Location in Karnataka, India Maskal (India)
- Coordinates: 13°59′37″N 76°41′43″E
- Country: India
- State: Karnataka
- District: Chitradurga
- Taluk: Hiriyur

Government
  - Type: Panchayati raj (India)
  - Body: Gram panchayat

Languages
  - Official: Kannada
- Time zone: UTC+5:30 (IST)
- PIN: 577546
- ISO 3166 code: IN-KA
- Vehicle registration: KA 16
- Nearest city: Chitradurga
- Civic agency: Village Panchayat
- Website: karnataka.gov.in

Maskal is a village in Hiriyur taluk in the Chitradurga district of Karnataka state, India. It belongs to the Bangalore Division. It is located 48 km towards the East from the district capital Chitradurga.

== Demographics ==
As per the 2011 Indian Census, the total population of the village is 5616, with 2,888 male and 2,728 females. The number of households in the village is 1256. Total area of Maskal is 2578 hectares.

The majority of the people belong to Uppara community followed by the Kurubas. Kannada is the primary language spoken in the village.
