= Zodiak Broadcasting Station =

- Lilongwe; Malawi

Programming
- Languages: English, Chichewa and Chitumbuka

Ownership
- Owner: Gospel Kazako

History
- First air date: 2005

Links
- Website: www.zodiakmalawi.com

Zodiak Broadcasting Station is a privately owned radio station in Malawi.

== History ==
It was founded in 2005 by Gospel Kazako. The station has more than 25 transmitting sites and reaches the whole of Malawi. Nearly 60% of its programmes are broadcast in Chichewa, Malawi's main language, with few others being addressed in Chitumbuka. One of its most popular shows is a talk show Tiuzeni Zoona.

== Election coverage ==
It became the official broadcaster of Presidential and Parliamentary elections in the 2009 elections due to its neutral coverage.

== Online ==
Zodiak has an online website.

== Accolades ==
It has been the recipient of several MISA awards. In 2019 Ruth Kulaisi won the Radio Talk Show Host of the Year at that year's MISA-Malawi media awards.
