= Subsource (band) =

British electronic music group

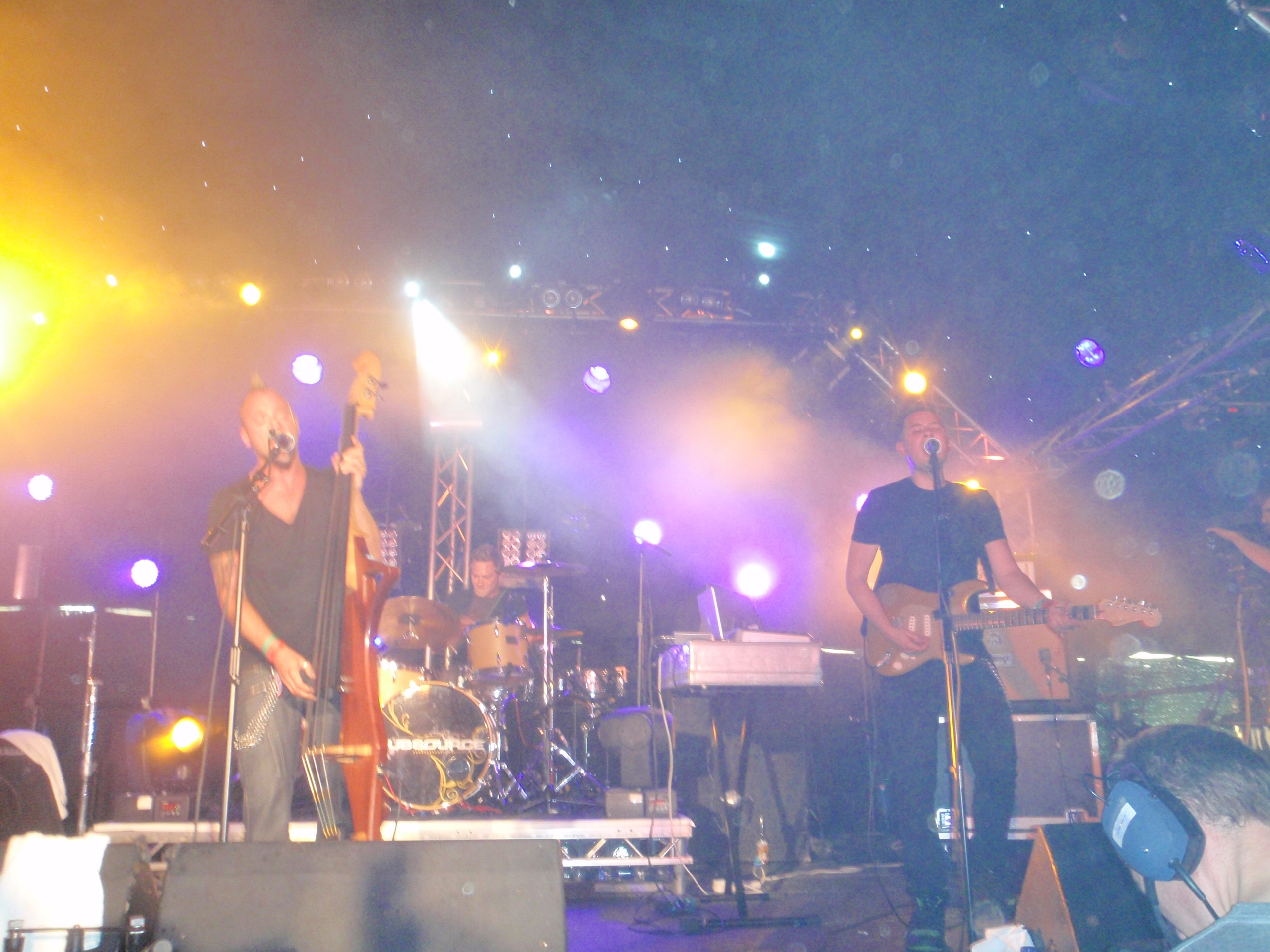

Background information
- Origin: Guildford, England
- Genres: Dubstep, punk, metal, electronica
- Members: Stuart Henshall; Paul Frazer; Dennis Ng; Vince Welch
- Past members: Kimba Mutanda; Neil Shervell; Stix
- Website: subsource.co.uk

Subsource are a British electronic music group. Their current sound is a fusion of dubstep and punk/metal genres and their lyrics have a theme of social commentary. The group has maintained a strong presence on the UK festival circuit due to the nature of the combination of dance music and live elements and they have consistently received critical acclaim for their live shows. Gig reviewers have commonly described their live shows as being energetic and displaying ferocity. Sound comparisons have been made to The Prodigy, Pendulum, Innerpartysystem and Rage Against the Machine.

== Musical style ==
Their current sound is a cross between dubstep and punk/metal genres.

In their earlier years, their shows were heavily improvised and often took place on the London squat/free party scene and their intention was to be 'playing dance-floor destroyers'.

== Group members ==
- Stuart Henshall (vocals/bass)

Stuart plays a Clifton hand-built upright electric double bass through a synth effect unit. He came close to death whilst driving the tour van into a tree at V Festival.

- Paul Frazer (electric guitar/synth)

Paul plays a Fender Stratocaster and A PRS through an Orange amplifier. He is Norwegian.

- Dennis Ng aka Borg (synths/electronics)

Dennis plays a Nord Wave and a Roland Handsonic HPD-15. He has also been seen using a Wii remote controller on-stage as a MIDI controller. He is British-born Chinese, studied at the University of Cambridge.

- Vince Welch (drums)

=== Past members ===
- Neil Shervell (drums)
- Kimba Mutanda (MC)
- Stix (MC)

== Subsource: A Dubumentary ==
Colin Arnold (Surgery Productions) directed a documentary following the band's journey over the course of 18 months, finishing in early 2011. The film's tagline is 'Most music documentaries are produced after bands have made it... very few capture their journey'. The film was released on DVD on 29 October 2012 by Left Films. The film was made available to view

John Landis described the documentary as being 'An insightful look at the truth about rock and roll.'

'Dubumentary' is a portmanteau of dubstep and documentary.

== Releases ==
=== 2010 – Tales From The Doombox (album) ===
Track listing

1. Tales From The Doombox
2. Street Soul Music
3. Some People
4. Disarm
5. Charge Me
6. The Ides
7. New Bones
8. Parasite
9. Machines In Real Life
10. Beats And Bandages

NME gave the album a good overall review and described it as 'fusing dubstep with cyber metal with great aplomb'. They went on to describe their debut album, 'Tales From The Doombox' as being like 'The Prodigy teaching a noise violation seminar to Sonic Boom Six'. Other reviewers in print and online generally praised the eclecticness and mentioned facets of dubstep, breakbeat, drum and bass, punk, hip-hop, reggae and metal being present in their sound. The band featured in Metal Hammer's 2010 Hot List of bands to watch.

"Parasite" was used in the US TV Crime show Numb3rs. It featured in the rock-climbing opening sequence of the premiere episode of Season 5.

"Disarm" was used by Sky Sports in the coverage of the first ever World Freerun Championships.

=== 2012 – Generation Doom (EP) ===
Track listing

1. Molotov
2. The Feeding
3. Lay You Out
4. It's All A Lie
5. Anarchy
6. Kill The Thief

Overall, reception was positive for this EP which was praised for its darker, heavier tones compared to the band's previous sound - and for mixing punk, rock and dubstep in an original way.

Other artists that commented for their press release for the EP include: Liam Howlett from The Prodigy – "These boys have a big, nasty sound, dangerous to my ears" Benji Webbe from Skindred – "It's the sound they use, they just f*ck up your speakers"

Molotov was used in a trailer for the video game World of Tanks which garnered over 200,000 in the first two days of going live.

=== Other tracks ===
Subsource are well known for their upbeat, loud and energetic remixes and collaborations with other artists - including:

- Skindred – Game Over (Subsource Remix) - released as the bonus track on the Deluxe Edition of Skindred's album, 'Union Black'
- Sonic Boom Six – Virus (Subsource Remix)
- Foster The People – Call It What You Want (Subsource Remix)
- Run Riot – A Light Goes Off (feat. Stu Subsource and Olly Hounds) – featured on Need For Speed: Most Wanted (2012) video game soundtrack

=== Resmashed series ===
1. Nirvana – Breed
2. Rage Against The Machine – Testify
3. System of a Down – Toxicity
4. Slipknot – Duality
5. Soundgarden – Spoonman
6. Metallica – Enter Sandman

== Use of music in films, TV and games ==
Subsource tracks also featured in the following video games:

- Juiced: Eliminator (PSP)
- MotoGP 07 (PS2)
- MotoGP 09/10 (PS3/Xbox 360)
- FIFA Street 3 (PS3/Xbox 360)

They also composed a remix of Strike Suit Zero's main theme, which was featured in the game itself, one if its trailer, as well as in the physical release of the soundtrack.
