= Dan Lu =

Malawian artist

- Birth name: Dan Lufani
- Born: July 26, 1987 (age 38); Mangochi, Malawi
- Genres: Afrobeat
- Occupation(s): Musician songwriter
- Years active: 2000–present

Dan Lufani (born July 1, 1987), best known as Dan Lu, and sometimes written as Dan Lufan, is a Malawian Afro-pop singer and songwriter. In 2011, he was awarded as best Afro pop artist of the year in Malawi Music Awards. In 2016, he was nominated in best R&B/Afro-pop Act along with other artists such as Theo Thomson and Kell Kay.

In 2023, Lufani's single Imfa (death) surpassed over K15 million (Malawian Kwacha) in one week. Lufani has recorded four albums namely Khaze (cousin), Shupie, So What and No Size. Lufani has collaborated with different artists in Africa such K-Millan from Zambia, Dizzy Don from Zimbabwe, Kcee from Nigeria, Nameless from Kenya and Bongani Fassie, the son of the late Blenda Fassie from South Africa.

== Background ==
=== Early life ===
Lufani was born on July 1, 1987, in Mangochi District as the fifth son in a family of eight children. Lufani's father is a pastor of the Baptist church in Malawi. He did his Secondary School education at Mangochi Secondary School in Mangochi.

== Music career ==
Lufani started singing in 2000s and gained national recognition after he released his first studio album titled Shupie. He was the band leader of Malawi's renowned band, Zembani Music Company, before founding his own band called Rockers band.

== Criticism and controversies ==
In 2023, the Department of Arts in Malawi told Lufani to change the lyrics of ‘Take My Body’ as it was under a wide criticism over sexual language.

In 2016, Lufani was at loggerheads with his South African-based promoter Sisqo who accused him of breaking contact agreements that he signed under Sisqo Entertainment.

In 2017, Lufani was beaten up by taxi drivers in Blantyre after he forcefully parked his car on already occupied parking lot.

== Personal life ==
Lufani is married to Katerina Nzima.

== See also ==
- Sangie
