= Ndirande Anglican Voices =

Malawian gospel music group

- Genres: Gospel music
- Years active: 1999–present
- Labels: Blantyre Anglican Church studios
- Members: Denis Kalimbe; Mary Ngwira, among others

Ndirande Anglican Voices is a Malawian renowned gospel music group from Blantyre formed in 1999. The group has released several successful albums, performed at various international music festivals, and collaborated with other renowned gospel artists. They have also won several awards, including the Malawi Gospel Music Award for Best Group in 2018.

== Background ==
=== Formation ===
The group was formed in 1999, based at Ndirande Anglican Church in Blantyre. They started as a church choir and gradually gained popularity, becoming one of the most celebrated gospel music groups in Malawi and beyond. They have released six albums, including "Ndasayina" (2001), "Tiyeni Tonse" (2005), "Mulungu Amatikondera" (2007), "Ndasamba Mmanja" (2010), "Zimandikwanira" (2013), and "Namondwe Tonthola" (2018). They have performed internationally in the UK, Mozambique, Zimbabwe, and Tanzania, and have won awards like Best Gospel Album and Best Gospel Group. The group's music director is Denis Kalimbe who composes the songs. The group sings in Chichewa, Chitumbuka and English. Some of the Chitumbuka songs include Mwauka Mkulu (You are Awake).

=== Music Style ===
Their music genre is a unique blend of traditional Malawian rhythms, African gospel, and contemporary Christian music, characterized by harmonious vocals, energetic performances, and inspiring lyrics.

==== Discography ====
Some of the popular songs include:

- Mundikondane (Love me)

- Mwina Mwina (Maybe Maybe)

- Mwalaika

- Tsalani (Stay well)

- Muli Mu Dzina (You are in a Name)

- Ndilibe (I have nothing)

- Mwauka Mkulu (You are Awake)
