= Dante Bucci =

American Hang musician

- Born: October 7, 1980; The Hague, Netherlands
- Died: August 13, 2014 (aged 33) Philadelphia, United States
- Occupation: Musician
- Instrument: Hang
- Website: dantebucci.com

Dante M. Bucci (October 7, 1980 – August 13, 2014) was a Dutch musician who played the Hang, a type of handpan.
