= Theo Thomson =

Malawian born singer/songwriter

Theo Thomson is a Malawian born singer-songwriter. Thomson is owner of the Blantyre-based Matalala Recording Studio. He lived in the UK, where he gained an interest in music with rapid artists productions performing and moved back to Malawi to expand his music career. His father is a former DJ and owner of Fm 101 Power radio Oscar Thomson. He is also the grandson of former Malawian Minister of Trade and Industry, Harry Thomson.

After years of collaborations on various tracks, he released his own debut album 'Gypsy' in 2010. His latest track ‘So Amazing’ received overwhelming requests and airplay on Malawi's state and private owned radios. It was at number one for a few weeks on the Malawian charts. The song has been popular in Zimbabwe, and he has also performed the song as an opening act on MTV's Big Brother Africa. His songs 'Kuthentha' (On fire)' and 'Stutter' have been featured on popular music stations Channel O and MTV. His music style is described as urban, R&B with a Malawian fusion.

He has collaborated with Malawian artists like Tay Grin, on his track ‘Maybe This May Be Love’ from his new yet-to-be released album ‘Nyau King’ and on the song ‘One Love One Heart’ by Tapps Bandawe that also features Nigerian artist, 2face Idibia and Zambian K’millian.

== Music ==
- 'Gypsy' (Album) 2010
- 'so Amazing' (single)
- 'Kuthentha' (single)
- Stutter (single)
- Gypsy;Awake (EP)

White Elephant (Album)

Dolo (single)
