= Maskal, Perm Krai =

Maskal Маскаль
- Village
- Location within Perm Krai Location within Russia
- Coordinates: 59°40′N 54°30′E
- Country: Russia
- Region: Perm Krai
- District: Kochyovsky District
- Time zone: UTC+5:00

Maskal (Russian: Маскаль) is a rural locality (a village) in Bolshekochinskoye Rural Settlement, Kochyovsky District, Perm Krai, Russia. The population was 36 as of 2010. There are 3 streets.

== Geography ==
Mitino is located 21 km northeast of Kochyovo (the district's administrative centre) by road. Bolshaya Kocha is the nearest rural locality.
