= St Bosseratti =

- Birth name: Dingaani Whayo
- Also known as: Ochaga, 3rd Degree
- Born: December 1, 1984 (age 40); Blantyre, Malawi
- Origin: Blantyre, Malawi
- Genres: Hip hop, R&B, electropop, Reggae, House
- Occupation(s): Songwriter, Producer
- Years active: 2008–present
- Labels: Bosseratti Music

St Bosseratti aka Dingaani Whayo (born December 1, 1984), is a Malawian composer and record producer.

Bosseratti has written and produced hit singles for South African musicians, such as Pitch Black Afro (Zonke Bonke) and Ifani (Ewe).
