= Great Angels Choir =

Malawian gospel group

The Great Angels Choir is a CAP gospel musical group from Lilongwe, Malawi. In 2016, the choir shared a stage with American singer, Don Moen. In 2023, it was rumoured that the choir was splitting to which it publicly denied. In September 2023, the choir collaborated with South Africa's Rebecca Malope in performance at the Blessings Gospel Concert at BICC in Lilongwe and other artists. In 2017, the choir hired Sipho Makhabane to spice their website.

The choir's lead vocalist is Jessie Zonda.
