= Alan Namoko =

Alan Nomoko Namoko (1956–1995) was a blind blues and jazz musician from Malawi.

Namoko played banjo and sang in Lomwe, Chewa and Nyanja languages. He became an influential figure in Malawi's music scene in the 1970s and 1980s. In later years, he toured around the world. He often performed with the Chimvu Jazz band. Namoko died in November 1995.

== Discography ==
- "A Chilenga (Mr.Chilenga)"
- "A Namoko Akulira (Namoko Mourns)"
- "Achilekwa (Mr.Chilekwa)"
- "Ana osiidwa (The orphans)", Alan Namoko and Chimvu Jazz, 1992
- "Gitala Kulira Ngati Chitsulo (Playing Guitar Like a Ringing Bell)"
- "Kakhiwa Miyene (And When I Die)"
- "Lameki (Lameck)"
- "Mwalimba Mtima (You Can Be So Heartless)"
- "Mwandilanga (You Have Punished Me)"
