= Blasto (singer) =

- Birth name: Otis Chilamba
- Origin: Lilongwe, Malawi
- Genres: Dancehall
- Occupation(s): Singer, Song writer

Blasto (born Otis Chilamba) is a popular reggae and dancehall singer from Lilongwe, Malawi. His recordings include Stronger (2014) and Persistence (2017). He is colloquially known as the "humble king of dancehall" in Malawi.
