= Phyzix =

Malawian rapper, record producer and entrepreneur

- Born: Noel Jack Chikoleka; December 18, 1986 (age 39); Lilongwe, Malawi
- Origin: Area 25, Lilongwe, Malawi
- Genres: Hip hop; Afrobeats; Drill; Trap
- Occupations: Rapper; record producer; songwriter; entrepreneur; banker; marketer
- Years active: 2006–present
- Label: It's Only Entertainment (IOE)
- Spouse: Ruth Kulaisi (m. 2016)

Noel Jack Chikoleka (born 18 December 1986), better known by his stage name Phyzix (also stylised as Man Phyzo, Phyzo, Gamba wa Suit, Atigo, Mountain Goat, Mphungu, Cholapitsa or Gamba), is a Malawian rapper, record producer, songwriter, and entrepreneur. He is a prominent figure in Malawian hip hop music. He gained recognition in 2006 following the release of the single "Cholapitsa" (The Boogeyman), which reportedly sold over 40,000 copies nationwide within a month.

Chikoleka is the founder and proprietor of his record label, It's Only Entertainment (IOE). Beyond music, he has pursued a parallel career in banking and marketing, rising to senior management level at NBS Bank in Blantyre.

== Early life ==
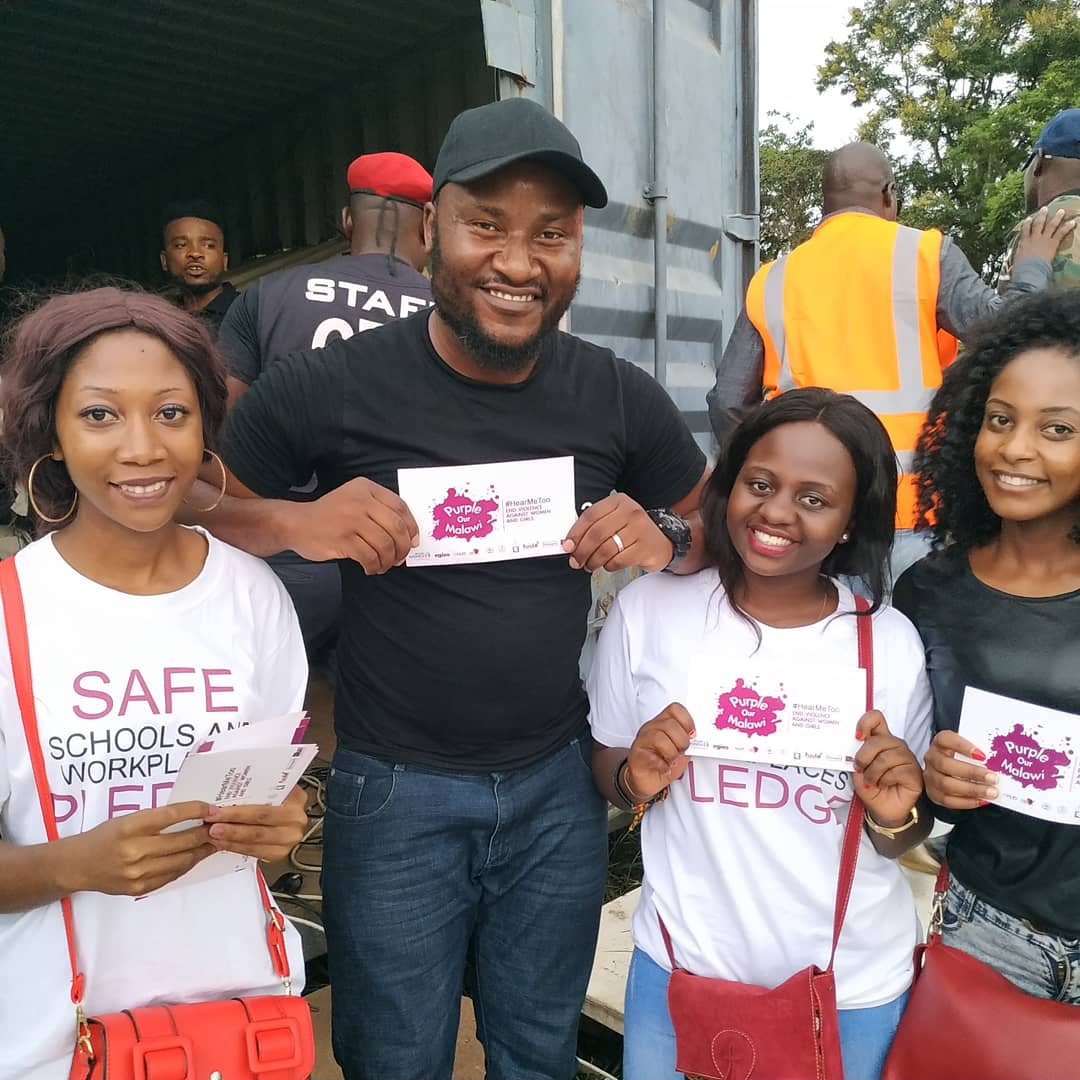
Phyzix in 2018 advocating for safe schools and workplaces for girls and women

Chikoleka was born on 18 December 1986 in Lilongwe, Malawi, and grew up in Area 12. He attended Marist Secondary School, where he excelled both academically—attaining 11 points in his Malawi School Certificate of Education (MSCE)—and athletically, participating in basketball, football, volleyball, table tennis, the 100-metre sprint, and martial arts. His stage name, Phyzix, is a play on the word "physics", reflecting his performance style and lyrical approach.

He is the son of Evelyn Josephine Chikoleka and the late Alec Jack Chikoleka, a banker and diplomatic civil servant respectively. He has two sisters, Elizabeth Sauka Makossah and Ewey Elsie Chikoleka, and one surviving brother, Alexander Tinga Chikoleka; another brother, Austin Chikoleka, passed away in 1998. His family originates from Dowa, where he holds lineage to a traditional chieftaincy (T/A Msakambewa, Kapilingidza Village, Dowa), and from Salima (Mwamadi Village, T/A Kambwiri).

In 2003, Chikoleka moved to Area 25, Lilongwe, during a period he has described as formative. His father had died in 1995, and his mother had recently retired from the Reserve Bank of Malawi while in poor health. He has described Area 25 as a formative period that inspired many of his songs, including "Cholapitsa", "Gamba", "Abwana", and "Usodzi".

Chikoleka began rapping in 1998 at age 12 while in Standard 7.

== Career ==
=== Breakthrough and early albums (2006–2011) ===
In 2006, Chikoleka gained recognition with "Cholapitsa", a breakthrough single that achieved chart success and sold over 40,000 copies within a month of release. The song's success was followed by early releases including The Overdue (2006) and Man Man, Vol. 1: Black Starz Don Shyne (2007), both later verified on streaming platforms including Deezer.

Following the release of "Cholapitsa", Chikoleka was withdrawn from The Polytechnic, a constituent college of the University of Malawi, where he had been studying Engineering. He was later also withdrawn from Mzuzu University, where he was studying a Bachelor of Science in Information and Communication Technology, in 2008.

In 2008, Chikoleka founded his entertainment company, originally named Bantu Records (later rebranded as It's Only Entertainment, IOE).

On 21 March 2009, he released his debut studio album, The Lone Ranger LP, which included singles "Gamba", "Jessie", "Usodzi", and "Abwana". His second album, Secret Service LP (2010), included a remix of "Cholapitsa" titled "Zolapitsa". His third album, Follow the Leader (2011), was produced by Snowky Kachimanga and Q Malewezi.

=== Sabbatical and return (2012–2015) ===
Following Follow the Leader, Chikoleka took a four-year sabbatical from music to pursue further education and professional development.

He returned to active recording with Gamba wa Suit in 2015, which featured collaborations with Gwamba and Martse.

=== Captain Long John and Captain Bae (2016–2018) ===
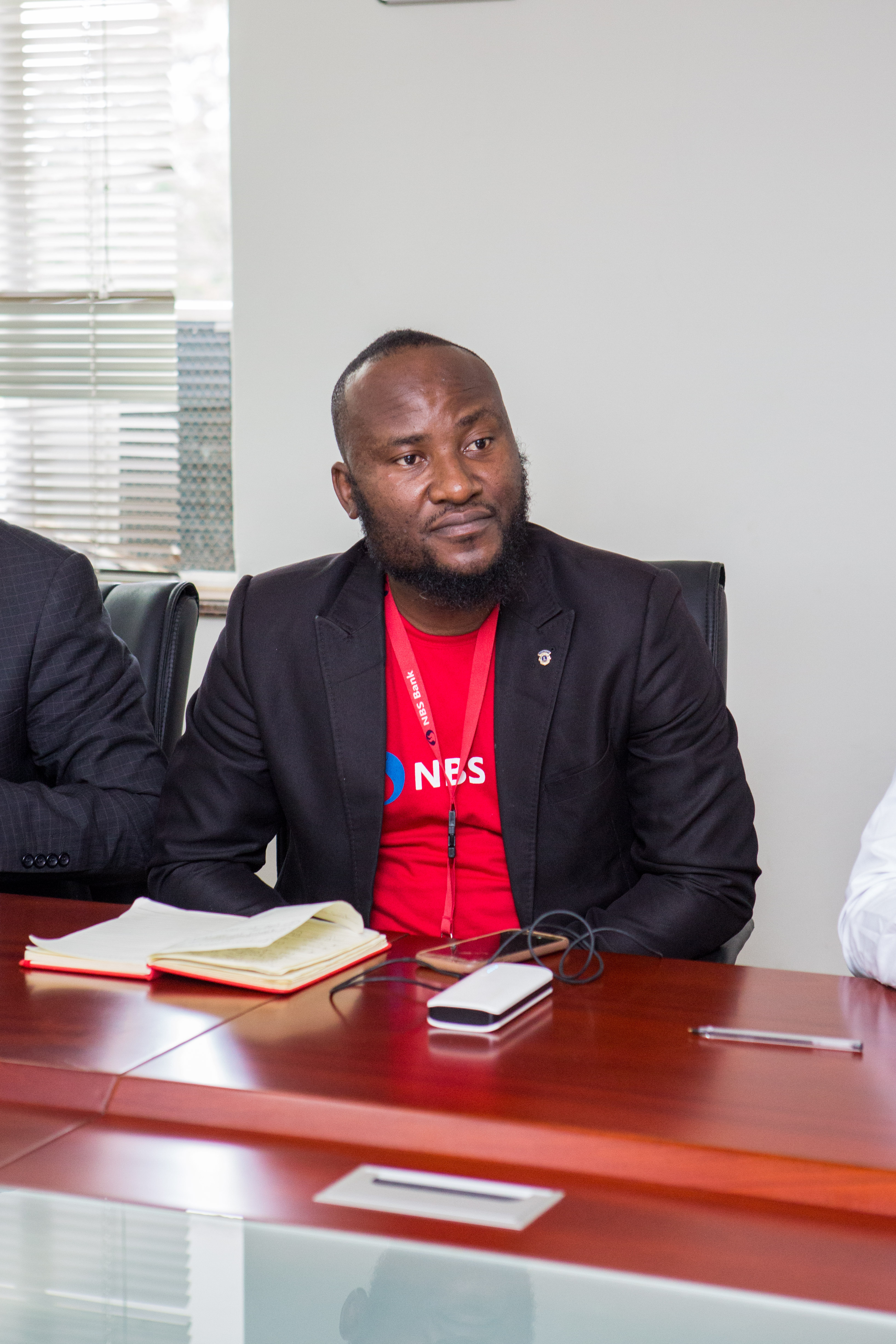
Phyzix in 2019 at a meeting representing NBS Bank as marketing manager

In 2016, Chikoleka released Captain Long John, which he wrote and recorded within a single month ahead of his wedding to Ruth Kulaisi, a Zodiak TV presenter and producer. The album received multiple nominations at the UMP Awards and Nyasa Music Awards.

In 2017, he released Captain Bae, a compilation including singles "KOTG (King of The Ghetto)", "Noni Noni", "Golide", "Patelera", and "Zibwente". In 2018, he released The Diaries, a joint album with Barry Uno.

=== Mutipatsa? campaign and international recognition (2018–2019) ===
In 2018 and 2019, ahead of Malawi's general elections, Chikoleka released "Mutipatsa?" ("What Have You Done For Us?"), a politically conscious single aimed at youth civic engagement. The campaign received coverage from the BBC and was recognised by the Young African Leaders Initiative (YALI) of the U.S. State Department.

In 2019, Phyzix also released SOLID, with coverage from Times Group and public release pages.

=== Gamba Season and major awards (2020) ===
In 2020, Chikoleka released Gamba Season, an EP that performed strongly on digital platforms. The project earned him multiple awards at two major award shows: he won Artist of the Year (Male), Album of the Year, and Song of the Year ("Makofi") at the Malawi Hip Hop Awards, and Best Hip Hop Act and Album of the Year at the UMP Awards.

The single "Follow" (featuring Eli Njuchi) was listed among BBC Africa top 20 best African hits during this period.

=== Flaws, Mountain Goat and FIGARO 7 (2021–2024) ===
In 2021, Chikoleka released Flaws, which won Best Album at the MASO Awards. The album was distributed to South Africa, the United Kingdom, and the United States.

In 2022, he released the single "Legends", earning a win at the MASO Awards for Best Collabo. In 2023, he released MOUNTAIN GOAT, and in 2024, FIGARO 7, both verified on Malawi Music and Deezer.

=== Mphungu (2026) ===
In 2026, Phyzix returned to music after a six-month recording hiatus with the release of Mphungu (meaning "eagle" in Chichewa). According to Chikoleka, the album was developed during a time of personal reflection and artistic reinvention, with themes centered on growth, resilience, leadership, purpose and legacy. He described the eagle as a symbol of vision, strength, patience, and the ability to rise above challenges, concepts that influenced both the album's narrative and creative direction. Chikoleka stated that the project reflected his experiences as an artist, father, banker, entrepreneur, and industry leader, exploring topics including success, relationships, mental health, spirituality, responsibility, and social issues.

== Professional career ==
Alongside his music, Chikoleka has maintained a parallel career in the corporate sector spanning over nine years, predominantly in banking. He served as Marketing Manager and Head of Marketing at Opportunity International Bank of Malawi (OIBM), and later as Marketing Manager and Transactional Banker (Executive Banker/Private Banking, Grade D2) at NBS Bank. He has also held roles as Investments Manager, Marketing Officer, Customer Consultant, Salesclerk at SFFRFM, and Lead Medical Detailer at WomanCare Global via Madison Holdings.

He holds a Professional Certificate in Marketing from the Chartered Institute of Marketing (CIM), studied at the University of Malawi's Management Development Centre, and an Intermediate Certificate in ICT from Mzuzu University's Centre for Open and Distance Learning. He has also pursued a Bachelor's Degree in Marketing Science via Global Business University (Europe) / Cyprus Institute of Marketing.

== Brand ambassadorships ==
Chikoleka has served as a brand ambassador for a range of local, regional, and international brands across multiple industries.

=== Formal brand ambassador roles ===
888bets Malawi (2024–2025): Chikoleka served as a brand ambassador for 888bets Malawi, an online sports betting platform. He appeared in outdoor billboard campaigns and promotional materials for the brand.

Kelfoods (2021–2022): Chikoleka was appointed as a brand ambassador for Kelfoods, representing Donna's Eggs, Proto Chicks, Proto Feeds, and Proto Vet.

WWE Snacks Malawi (2021–2022): Chikoleka served as the face of WWE Snacks Malawi, a Kelfoods-distributed product, appearing in professional promotional photography and marketing materials.

PC Merchants Limited (2020–2021): Chikoleka signed a one-year renewable clothing sponsorship deal with PC Merchants Limited, a boutique menswear retailer. Under the arrangement, PC Merchants dressed him throughout the year.

Malville Boutique Hotel (2022–2024): Chikoleka served as brand ambassador for Malville Boutique Hotel, a hospitality establishment in Malawi.

M & R Panel Beating and Paint Service (2020–2021): Chikoleka was brand ambassador for M & R Panel Beating and Paint Service during this period.

Soft Touch Products (2025): Chikoleka became brand ambassador for Soft Touch Products in 2025.

=== Influencer and endorsement engagements ===
In addition to his formal ambassadorial contracts, Chikoleka has undertaken influencer and endorsement engagements with WSBet, 1XBet, NBS Bank, Airtel Malawi, Telekom Networks Malawi (TNM), K Motors, and Go Green Malawi (British Council).

== Activism and community work ==
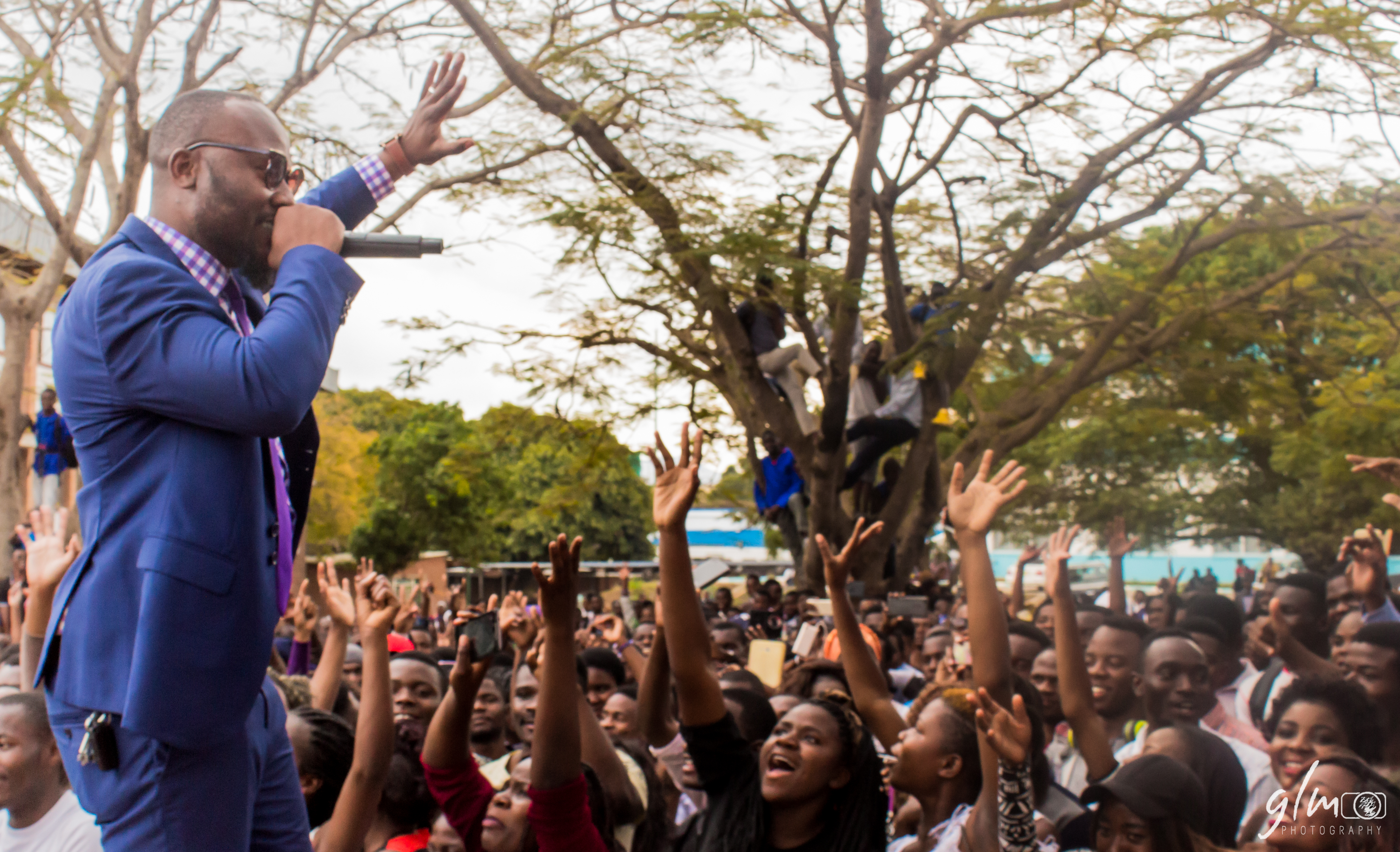
Phyzix performing at polytechnic (now Mubas) in 2018

Chikoleka has participated in youth outreach and community development initiatives. His civic activities include free performances to support flood victims through the Umodzi and Ndife Amodzi Floods Response; motivational speeches and performances for children living with HIV through Baylor College of Medicine Children's Foundation Malawi; ambassador work for the British Council's Go Green Malawi Project on climate change; and HIV/AIDS awareness campaigns with MACRO.

He has also organised the Ghetto Festival, a community music event held in Lilongwe. He is a member of Lions Club International.

== International performances ==
Chikoleka has shared stages with international artists including Cassper Nyovest, K'naan, Sway DaSafo, The Maccabees, and Oliver Mtukudzi. He has performed at international festivals including Lake of Stars, WAPi (Words and Pictures), the Domestic Tourism Music Festival, and La Fête de la Musique.

== Discography ==
The following discography treats mixtapes, EPs, and joint albums as album releases, consistent with how the artist has categorised his projects.

Studio albums, EPs and mixtapes
Title	Year	Notes
The Overdue	2006	Verified on Deezer as The Overdue Mixtape
Man Man, Vol. 1: Black Starz Don Shyne	2007	Verified on Deezer
From the Dust	2008	Verified on Deezer as From the Dust Mixtape
The Lone Ranger LP	2009	Debut studio album; singles: "Gamba", "Abwana", "Jessie", "Usodzi"
Secret Service LP	2010	Includes "Zolapitsa" (Cholapitsa remix)
Follow the Leader	2011	Singles include "Follow the Leader"
Chilipo	2012/2013	Sources conflict on exact year; Deezer indexes 2012, Malawi Music indexes 2013
Gamba wa Suit	2015	Comeback album; features Gwamba, Martse
Captain Long John	2016	Multi-award nominated; includes "Dekha"
Captain Bae	2017	Compilation; includes "Noni Noni", "KOTG", "Golide"
The Diaries (with Barry Uno)	2018	Joint album
SOLID	2019	
Gamba Season	2020	EP; includes "Makofi", "Follow" ft. Eli Njuchi
Flaws	2021	MASO Awards Best Album winner
MOUNTAIN GOAT	2023	Verified on Malawi Music and Deezer
FIGARO 7	2024	Verified on Malawi Music and Deezer
MPHUNGU	2026	Verified on Malawi Music, Spotify and Deezer

== Awards and nominations ==
=== UMP Awards ===
Year	Nominee / work	Award	Result
2016	Phyzix	Best Hip Hop/Rap Artist of the Year	Nominated
2016	Captain Long John	Album of the Year	Nominated
2017	Phyzix	Best Hip Hop/Rap Act of the Year	Nominated
2017	"Noni Noni" ft. Martse & Dan Lu	Best Collaboration	Nominated
2020	Phyzix	Best Hip Hop Act	Won
2020	Gamba Season	Album of the Year	Won
2020	Phyzix	Male Artist of the Year	Nominated
2020	"Follow" ft. Eli Njuchi	Song of the Year	Nominated
2020	"Follow" ft. Eli Njuchi	Music Video of the Year	Nominated
2025	Phyzix	Best Hip Hop/Rap Act	Nominated

=== Malawi Hip Hop Awards ===
Year	Nominee / work	Award	Result
2020	Phyzix	Artist of the Year (Male)	Won
2020	"Makofi"	Song of the Year	Won
2020	Gamba Season	Album of the Year	Won
2020	Phyzix	Verse of the Year	Nominated
2020	"Makofi" ft. Dare Devilz	Best Collaboration	Nominated
2020	Phyzix	Best Hip Hop Live Performance	Nominated
2020	Phyzix	Hustler of the Year	Nominated

=== Africa Hip Hop Music Awards ===
Year	Nominee / work	Award	Result
2021	Gamba Season	Hip Hop Album of the Year	Nominated
2021	Phyzix	Best Male Artist of the Year	Nominated
2021	"Makofi"	Song of the Year	Nominated
2021	Phyzix	People's Choice	Nominated

=== Nyasa Music Awards ===
Year	Nominee / work	Award	Result
2017	Captain Long John	Album of the Year	Nominated

=== MASO Awards ===
Year	Nominee / work	Award	Result
2021	Flaws	Best Album	Won
2022	"Legends"	Best Collabo	Won
2025	"Super Star"	Best Collaboration	Won
2025	Phyzix	Best Hip Hop Act	Nominated

=== MUMA Awards ===
Year	Nominee / work	Award	Result
2014	Phyzix	Best Hip Hop/Rap Artist of the Year	Nominated

== Personal life ==
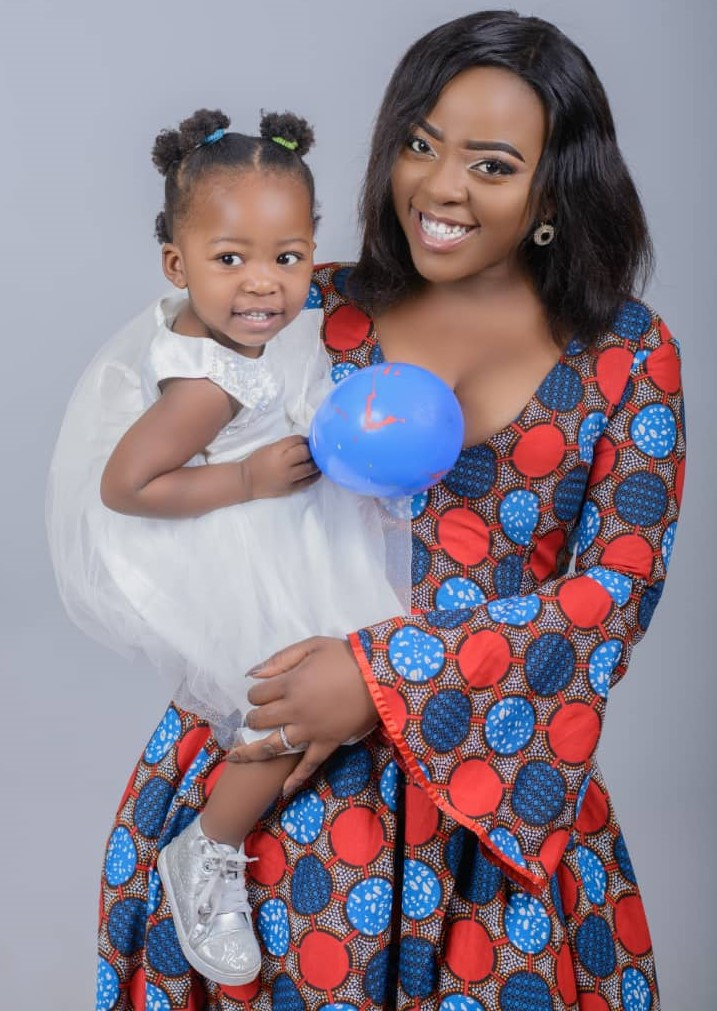
Ruth Kulaisi and Alyssa

Chikoleka married Ruth Kulaisi, a Zodiak TV presenter and producer, in 2016. The couple have a daughter, Alyssa Grace Chikoleka.

His niece, Trinity Pempho Chikoleka, known professionally as Complex, is also a rapper. His nephew Sina Makossah is a footballer based in the United Kingdom.

Chikoleka identifies as a born-again Christian.
