= Katelele Ching'oma =

Malawian musical artist and songwriter (1991–2024)

Katelele Ching'oma (4 June 1991 – 18 January 2024) was a Malawian musical artist and songwriter known for his breakthrough hit song "Asowe" in 2009 and other songs. He released his debut album Ndili Nawo Mwayi in 2011 which sold over 80,000 copies in a single week.

== Life and career ==
Katelele Ching'oma was born in Nsanje on 4 June 1991. He moved to Lilongwe for his musical career. On 17 January 2024, Ching'oma died due to liver damage at Kamuzu Central Hospital in Lilongwe. He was 32. He had been suffering from health problems for some time.

Ching'oma's notable songs include Asowe (She should pack), Mulomwa and Ndili Nawo Mwai (I have luck), among others.

== See also ==
- Moses Makawa
