= Wambali Mkandawire =

Malawian musician (1952–2021)

Wambali
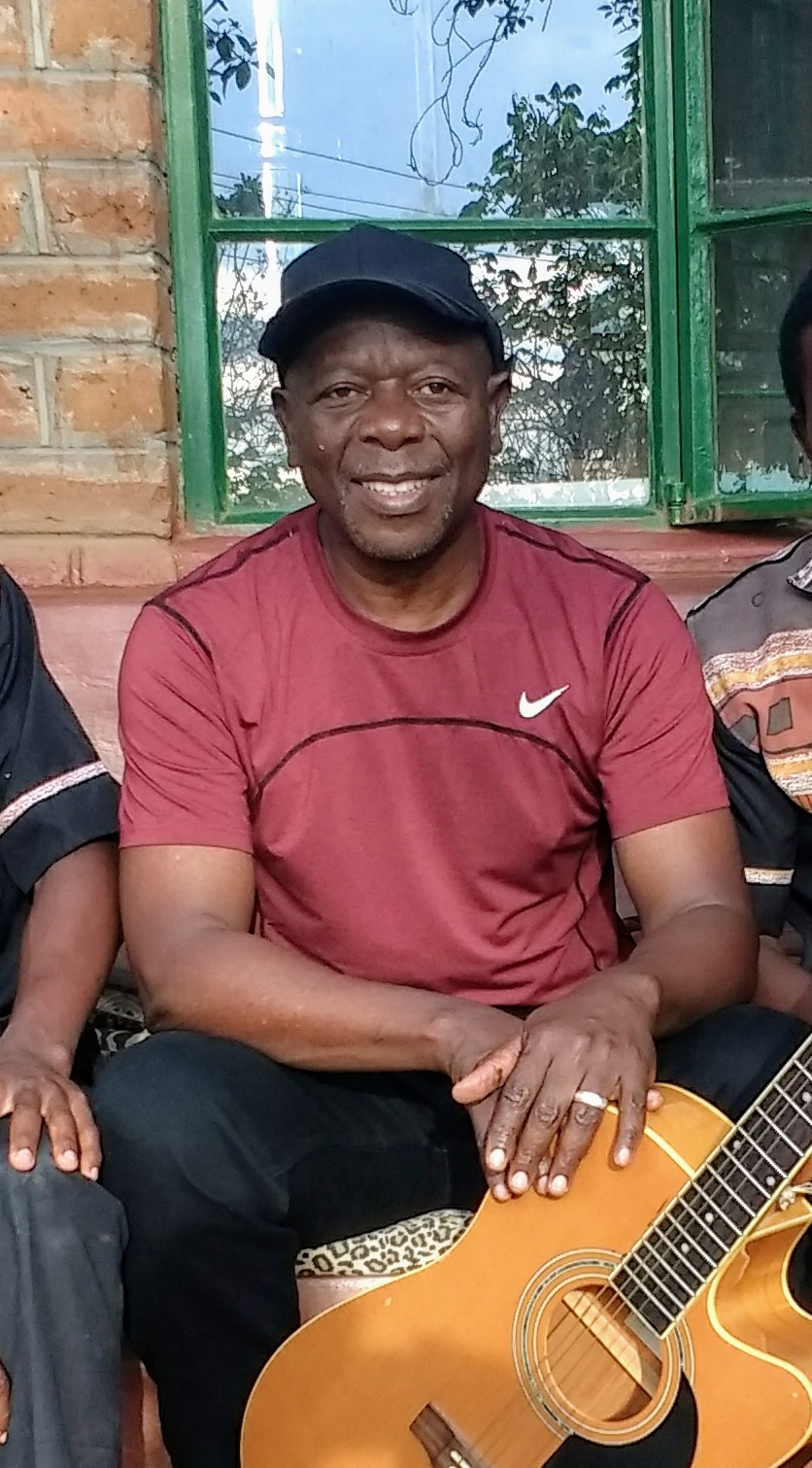

Background information
- Birth name: Greenwood Mkandawire
- Born: 10 July 1952; Democratic Republic of Congo
- Died: 31 January 2021 (aged 68); Lilongwe, Malawi
- Genres: Jazz, World music, Afro Jazz, gospel, soul

Wambali Mkandawire (10 July 1952 – 31 January 2021), popularly known as Mtebeti Wambali Mkandawire was a Malawian jazz singer and activist.

== Early life ==
He was born Greenwood Mkandawire in 1952 in the Congo to Malawian parents from the Mlowe village in the Northern district of Rumphi and then later lived in Mzuzu. He wanted to become a musician but his grandparents were against the idea since he was still a student. When he dropped out of school in the 1970s he put his efforts into music.

Wambali lived in Mzuzu where he set up a mission rural center and pastoring an indigenous church. Together with his wife, Wambui, they started a publishing company, "Kajimete Arts Publishing", to help promote Malawian talent.

== Early musical inspiration ==
He was introduced to Congolese music whilst living in Malawi by his Malawian grandparent that had been living in the Congo. He was also introduced to South African music from the South African miners that worked in the mine in the north. Through the radio, Wambali came across Western pop music.

=== Rock band influence ===
He joined a band in Blantyre "Sounds Pentagon", a local band that played western pop music. He was the lead singer of the band whose genre was rock music fused with traditional Malawian music. The band soon disbanded due to lack of funding.

=== Religious/Gospel influence ===
Wambali experienced a dramatic religious awakening that led him to pursue religious training in the Christian missions by 1984. He joined "New Song" a Youth for Christ (YFC) band as a singer. The group began to tour churches and schools in various African countries like South Africa, Namibia, and Zimbabwe. By 1986, he moved to South Africa where he worked in Alexandra and Soweto townships with YEC youth clubs. By 1988, he recorded his first solo album. Wambali left Malawi for the UK in 1989 to study Biblical Cross-Cultural Musicology.

== Early music career ==
By 1988 he was already recording and touring with South African Music group "Friends First". In the same year, Wambali recorded his first solo album with Krakatoa Music in Cape Town. The album by First Friends was released in Malawi, but due to its political nature, the group encountered censorship. One of its songs was banned.

While in the UK in 1989, Wambali recorded his third and fourth albums in Glasgow, Scotland. The third one was released at the Greenbelt Festivals in Northampton where he performed with professional bands. The fourth album was released in Malawi 1992 but did not receive much support from the local musical industry (deejays and radio) largely due to the political nature of his music. Malawi, at that time was under the leadership of Kamuzu Banda. Lack of promotion for his work led to financial strains and music production stopped altogether. Poor finances led him to take odd jobs by 1992, and he began touring in churches internationally in places like Germany, Austria, Switzerland. It was during his tour in Kenya that he met Wambui Muruiki whom he married a year later.

== Political activism ==
He got involved in campaigning for the release of Mr Chakufwa Chihana who had been arrested for criticism towards the Banda regime. His music became associated with the political opposition so his music suffered a further loss of support.

== Music career ==
His release of "Zani Muwone" in 2002 (produced by JB Arthur, co-founder of the Instinct Africaine label, (together with Sibusiso Victor Masondo), and owner of Joe's Garage Recording studio in Johannesburg brought him popularity in South Africa and in Malawi. Wambali was soon invited to perform at the NORTH SEA JAZZ FESTIVAL 2002 in Cape Town. This album also won him many international awards including being the first African to win the WIPO (World Intellectual Property Organisation) AWARD FOR CREATIVITY. In 2007 Wambali launched his album 'Moto' and retired from public performances. He returned in 2011 with the launch of a worship album 'Liberty'. In 2015 he launched a purely Jazz album titled Calabrash Breath.

== Philanthropy and community service ==
- Board member – Action Aid International, Malawi

== Death ==
He died from COVID-19 on 31 January 2021, at age 68, during the COVID-19 pandemic in Malawi.

== Albums ==
- Tidzamtamanda - 1987
- Kumtengo - 1991
- Ntchemo - 1998
- Zani Muwone - 2002 (recorded by Joe Arthur and Mte Wambali Mkandawire in South Africa)
- Moto - 2007
- Liberty - 2011 (recorded by Joe Arthur, Duane Arthur & Graham Smith in South Africa)
- Calabrash Breath - 2015
- Chipakato - 2022 (released posthumously)

== Music awards and nominations ==
- WIPO (World Intellectual Property Organisation) AWARD FOR CREATIVITY- 2002
- KORA AWARD Nomination - "Best Artiste from Southern Africa", for his work, "Zani Muwone"
- SAMA Music Award - for Best African Artiste - 2003
- BEFFTA Music Award - Best African Legend - 2015
