= Copyright Association of Malawi =

Malawian organization

Copyright Association of Malawi (COSOMA) is a Malawian parastatal organization established in 1992 after the enactment of the Copyright Act of 1989. Its main objective is promotion and protection of interest of composers, authors, performers, producers and broadcasters. COSOMA collects and distributes royalties to the rights holders for their rights. The organization has two branches or offices: a Copyright office which is responsible for the implementation of the Copyright Act and a Collective Management Organization (CMO) that ensures collective management of musical, literary and artistic works.
