= Maskal (singer) =

Malawian Afro-R&B singer

Maskal (born Masiye Kalso Kasaru on November 20, 1985) is a Malawian Afro-R&B singer from Ntcheu. His most popular song is "Udalire". He was nominated in two categories at the Malawian Music Awards (MMA) 2011 – "Best Male" and "Best R&B". He won Best Male Vocal for the MMA 2011.

== Career ==
=== Early career ===
He has a diploma in Information Systems from Polytechnic and worked as an IT officer for the Blantyre Malaria Project.

== Discography ==
- Nthawi – 2010
  - Track list:
    1. Udalire (P. Manyozo, M. Kasaru) – produced by Percy Manyozo
    2. Kuwala Kwako Feat' Young Kay (P. Manyozo, M. Kasaru, F. Kaphuka) – produced by Percy Manyozo
    3. Ndimakukonda (P. Manyozo, M. Kasaru) – produced by Percy Manyozo
    4. Ndamasulidwa (B. Nkata, M. Kasaru) – produced by God's Favorite
    5. Wa CV Feat' Piksy (G. Pasanje, M. Pasanje, M. Kasaru, E. Zangazanga) – produced by The Daredevilz
    6. Ndiwe Wanga (P. Manyozo, M. Kasaru) – produced by Percy Manyozo
    7. Chikondi Sindalama feat. Biriwiri (P. Manyozo, M. Kasaru, K. Munthali, K. Limwame) – produced by Percy Manyozo
    8. Mtima Wako (P. Manyozo, M. Kasaru) – produced by Percy Manyozo
    9. Nthawi (S. Kandoje, M. Kasaru) – produced by Sonyezo Kandoje
    10. Just To Say Hi (S. Beatz, M. Kasaru) – produced by Sannie Beatz
    11. Hey (B. Nkata, M. Kasaru) – produced by God's Favorite
    12. Superman (P. Manyozo, M. Kasaru) – produced by Percy Manyozo
    13. Kuwala Kwako remix feat. Young Kay, Third Eye, BarryOne & Cyclone(P. Manyozo, M. Kasaru, F. Kaphuka, M. Mwanza, B. Mkorongo, P. Mkorongo) – produced by Percy Manyozo
- Umunthu – November 2012
  - Track list:
    1. Chikondi (P. Manyozo, M. Kasaru) – produced by Percy Manyozo
    2. Umamva Bwanji? (Y. Nkhwazi, M. Kasaru) – produced by Yesaya Nkhwazi
    3. Linga Langa (P. Manyozo, M. Kasaru) – produced by Percy Manyozo
    4. Sindinazolowele (B. Nkata, M. Kasaru) – produced by God's Favorite
    5. Zili Ndi Iwe (P. Manyozo, M. Kasaru) – produced by Percy Manyozo
    6. Umpeze Wina (P. Manyozo, M. Kasaru) – produced by Percy Manyozo
    7. Wampeza (P. Manyozo, M. Kasaru) – produced by Percy Manyozo
    8. Kudzagwa Mvula (Y. Nkhwazi, M. Kasaru) – produced by Yesaya Nkhwazi
    9. Usatope (P. Manyozo, M. Kasaru) – produced by Percy Manyozo
    10. Akanapanda Kudziwa (B. Nkata, M. Kasaru) – produced by God's Favorite

Singles

    1. - The way You are (Sonny Music productions UK, M.kasaru)- Produced by Sonny
    2. - Gwiritsa(OBK, M.Kasaru) - Produced by OBK Records
    3. - Mnyumba mwanga ( OBK, M. Kasaru, ) - Produced by OBK Records

== Awards and nominations ==
- Malawian Music Award 2011 – Winner – "Best Male Vocal"
- Malawian Music Award 2011 – Nominee – "Best Male R&B"
