= Mlaka Maliro =

Malawian gospel musician

- Born: March 23, 1984 (age 41); Blantyre, Malawi
- Genres: Gospel
- Occupation(s): Musician songwriter
- Years active: 1990–present

Mlaka Maliro is a Malawian gospel singer, songwriter, and evangelist. He rose to fame in the late 1990s with his debut album "Dzanja Lalemba" (The Hand Has Written) which sold over 131,000 copies in four months. He has released several successful albums, including "Maloto", "Usalire", and "Gologolo". His music career spans over two decades, with a transition from secular to gospel music in 2011.

== Background ==
=== Early life and career ===
Maliro was born on March 23, 1984, in Blantyre. He started his music career in the early 1990s. His popular songs include "Wangolakwa" and "Abraham", among others. His music is a blend of roots reggae and traditional Malawian rhythms, with lyrics that inspire and uplift. He has performed at numerous concerts and festivals, both locally and internationally, and has collaborated with various artists.

==== Transition to preaching ====
Apart from his music, Maliro is also an evangelist and has preached at several crusades and events. He has been recognized for his contributions to the music industry and has won several awards.

== See also ==
- Ethel Kamwendo Banda
