= Paul Banda =

Malawian musician

Sir Paul Banda is a Malawian musician, songwriter, producer and videographer. In 2023, Banda received a lifetime award.

== Career ==
He is a member of the Malawian pop group called the Alleluya Band, which he founded in the 1970s. He is regarded as the founder of modern Malawi music. During his time in early 2000s and 1990s, he taught different artists to sing. These artists include Malume Bokosi, Lucius Banda, Paul Chaphuka and many more. He is the older brother of Lucius Banda.

In 1996, Banda produced the Malawi's highest selling album of all time titled "Cease fire" that sold 2 million copies under IY studios production, sung by Lucius. It sold the first 600,000 copies in a single week. Banda's song "Tiima Pamodzi" is about establishing a sense of national identity among the Malawi people.
