= Zani Challe =

Malawian singer

- Born: Zani Michelle Chiumia; November 21, 1985 (age 40); Nkhata Bay
- Citizenship: South Africa
- Education: Mzuzu University of Malawi
- Occupation: actress; artist
- Years active: 2012- present
- Known for: Single Tonight
- Awards: 2016 African Music Industry Awards (nominated); 2016 Malawi UMP Awards (won)

Zani Michelle Chiumia (born 21 November 1985 ) is a Malawian artist, actress, model and former TV presenter. She gained international recognition in music when she collaborated with a Nigerian reggae-dancehall singer and songwriter, Patoranking, on a song called "Single Tonight" released in 2016.

Chiumia was one of the eight selected entertainers by the International Central Working Committee (ICWC) for the forthcoming projects that were scheduled in March 2017 in Nigeria. In 2018, she was nominated for best female newcomer in 2016 African Music Industry Awards (AMIA) Afrika – People’s Choice awards. She was the only nominee from Malawi. In 2017, she was nominated for her 2017 song Chikondi Chako (your love). Chiumia is the only Malawian artist appearing in the rest of the 32 award categories. She has performed in the United States along with other artists such as Tay Grin. In November 2016, she won best Malawi female artist at Malawi UMP awards.

== Background ==
=== Early life ===
Chiumia was born on 6 June in 1993 in Nkhata Bay district in Malawi to Tumbuka parents. She is a Tumbuka by tribe.

=== Music ===
Chiumia collaborated on single called “Single Tonight” that was spotted acting in the few movies she has done abroad. She revealed that ICWC took interest in her when she was acting for the drama series “The Dragons”.

== Achievements ==
=== African Music Industry Awards ===
Year	Nominee / work	Award	Result
2016	Herself	best female newcomer	Nominated

=== UMP awards ===
Year	Nominee / work	Award	Result
2016	Herself	best female artist	Won

== Personal life ==
Chiumia was in a relationship and in February 2021, she announced that her boyfriend had died.
