= Ethel Kamwendo Banda =

Malawian musician

- Born: November 22, 1969 (age 56); Blantyre, Malawi
- Genres: Gospel; Afrobeat
- Occupations: Musician songwriter
- Years active: 1993–present
- Spouse: Blessings Banda

Ethel Timba Kambenje, popularly known as Ethel Kamwendo Banda, is a Malawian gospel musician from Blantyre. She has released several albums and DVDs. She has won Best Female Gospel Artist (Malawi Music Awards) and Best Gospel Album (Malawi Music Awards), as well as Best Video (Malawi Music Awards).

== Background ==
Banda was born on 22 November 1969, in Blantyre as Ethel Timba Kambenje to Frone Timba, a kachasu brewer, and a banjo-playing father. She grew up in a Christian family and was exposed to music from a young age. She attended St. Columba Primary School and later went to St. Mary's Secondary School.

Banda started her music career at the age of nine with the Kamwendo Brothers Band. She later joined the Ravers Band, Wepaz, Mitondo, and Sapitwa, becoming a star vocalist. She has also performed with her brother Jack Kamwendo's One Mega Band. Her father, the late Kamwendo Phiri, was a banjo player, and she used to sing with her brothers, who later formed the Kamwendo Brothers Band. Her sister, Beatrice Kamwendo, also became a professional singer and dancer (she died in 2019).

== Gospel Music And Success ==
Ethel was known for her dance moves, stage presence and voice. In the early 2000s, she became a born-again Christian and shifted her focus to gospel music.

Her first gospel album, Amen, was initially received with skepticism. However, following the success of its lead single, the album gained momentum. Shortly after, she released her second gospel album, Ndiumboni. The album became a crossover hit with several successful songs.

Her most significant success came with the album Mwatikondera, which became one of the best-selling Malawian album. It was praised for its innovative, futuristic production, Ethel’s powerful vocals, and strong songwriting and as its hit songs.

In the 2010s, she received an honorary doctorate in recognition of her contributions to the music industry.

== Discography ==
- Mwatenga Mbiri Muliyenda (1993)
- Mwatonyanya Nsanje
- Amen!
- Ndiumboni
- Hossana
- Mwatikondera (2007)
- Ndinu Nokha (2008)
- Zabwino Zonse (2011)
- Chete (2012
- Ndilipanzere (2017)
- Tate Ndinu Woyera (2018)
- Moyo Wanga (2019)

== Awards ==
Banda has released several albums and DVDs, which are among the best-selling in Malawi. She has won numerous awards, including:

- Best Female Gospel Artist (Malawi Music Awards)
- Best Gospel Album (Malawi Music Awards)
- Best Video (Malawi Music Awards)

== Personal life ==
Banda is married with three children.
