= Billy Kaunda =

Malawian politician and musician

Billy Kaunda is a Malawian musician and politician who is the current member of parliament from Mzimba District. He went to parliament on an independent ticket in the 2009 Parliamentary and presidential elections. He once served in the Malawi Cabinet as Deputy Minister of Youth Development and Sports under the Bingu wa Mutharika Government. He was also in the previous Parliament (2004–2009) on the National Democratic Alliance ticket and also served as a Deputy Minister.

He has set historical records by winning in two different constituencies as a Member of Parliament i.e. in Blantyre (2004–2009) and Mzimba (2009–2014). He is also one of the youngest people to hold a Deputy Ministerial post.

Apart from politics he is a musician who was taught to sing by the late Lucius Banda from Balaka Township, Malawi winning Musician of the Year position on entertainers of the year program in the late 1990s. He took up the cause of the poor masses in songs like "Mwapindulanji", "Kumidima", "Agalatia" and "Lupanga" among many more songs.
