= Lucius Banda =

Malawian singer-songwriter (1970–2024)

- Also known as: Soldier (Soja)
- Born: Lucius Chicco Banda; 17 August 1970; Balaka, Southern Region, Malawi
- Died: 30 June 2024 (aged 53) Johannesburg, South Africa
- Genres: Malawian Reggae; Reggae; Afro pop
- Occupations: Politician; Singer-songwriter
- Instruments: Vocals, keyboard
- Years active: 1993–2024
- Label: Zembani Music Company

Lucius Chicco Banda (17 August 1970 – 30 June 2024), better known by his stage name Soldier Lucius Banda, was a Malawian musician, music producer and member of parliament.

== Early life and music career ==
Banda was born on 17 August 1970 in Sosola Village under Group Village headman Kapalamula and Traditional Authority Nsamala in Balaka District of Southern Malawi. He went to Mponda Full Primary School. He started when he started singing with his brother Paul Banda, the leader of the Alleluya Band. He first appeared on stage in 1985 with the Alleluya Band.

Banda went to South Africa in 1993 when he joined Dorkey house in Johannesburg spending a year studying music.

He recorded his first album titled Son of a Poor Man' at Shandel music studio with the help of Argentinian producer George Arigone, Nomhlanhla Nkhize and Deborah Fraser on backing vocals. His album became popular.

In 1997, Banda formed his own band, Zembani, after recording his fourth album (Take Over) to help local and up keeping musicians in Malawi. He was controversial in the last days of Hastings Banda's regime

Banda was host to many musicians, Mlaka Maliro, Paul Chaphuka, Billy Kaunda, Cosi Chiwalo, Wendy Harawa, Emma Masauko, Enort Mbandambanda and Charles Nsaku.

Banda experienced the hardest of times as a musician as his music was banned, censored or sometimes denied venues and segregated against by government.

In 2010, he released another album, 15-15 - My Song, which was banned by the state broadcaster, Malawi Broadcasting Corporation (MBC). In June 2010, Banda and other musicians from Malawi were invited to play in Germany. Their venue in Cologne was the key point for an upcoming 2011 Lucius Banda Europe tour. His travelling to Germany attracted a lot of public and political interest in Malawi. He released Thank you album in 2015. Currently, he had nineteen albums to his credit.

In January 2021, he was admitted to hospital for high blood pressure and released three days later. In May 2021, it was revealed that he suffered from kidney failure.

== Political career ==
Until August 2006, he was an MP for the district of Balaka North, but lost his seat because he was convicted of having fake academic qualifications. He was sentenced to 21 months of hard labour in Zomba prison, but released in November 2006, three months and two appeals after his arrest. This experience inspired one of his albums, Cell 51 Maximum.

In the year 2010 he fell out of favor with the DPP-led Government of the late Bingu wa Mutharika (former President of Malawi). Malawians look to him as a mouthpiece on political oppression. Meanwhile, in the 2014 Tripartite Elections, Banda reclaimed his Balaka Central Constituency as Member of Parliament in which he won with a wide margin of 16,303 votes against his competitor who came second with 8,147.

== Death ==
Banda died of renal failure at Sunninghill Hospital in Johannesburg, South Africa, at the age of 53.

== Discography ==
=== Studio albums ===
- Son of a Poor Man
- Down Babylon
- Cease Fire
- Takeover
- Yahweh
- Unity
- How Long
- Not Easy Road
- Money and Power
- Love and Hate

List of studio albums, with selected information
Title	Album details	Certification
Son of a Poor Man	Released: 1994; Label: Independent; Formats: Cassette tape|CD	None
