= Tay Grin =

Malawian hip hop artist

- Born: Limbani Kalilani; June 15, 1986 (age 39)
- Origin: Blantyre, Malawi
- Genres: Hip hop Afrobeats
- Occupations: Rapper, Singer, Businessman
- Instrument: Vocals
- Years active: 2008–present
- Label: Black Rhyno Entertainment

Limbani Kalilani (born 15 June 1986) is a Malawian Hip Hop artist better known by his stage name Tay Grin. In 2009 Tay Grin founded an Entertainment & Event Promotion company, which helps to promote events across Malawi. The company is known as Black Rhyno Entertainment. In 2014, Grin won a Black Entertainment Film Fashion Television and Arts (BEFFTA) award for Best International African Act. In 2016, he won the BEFFTA Star Award in the music category. He has performed at the annual Lake of Stars Music Festival. He also won the 2016 WatsUp TV Africa Music Video Awards Best Traditional Video award, with the Video Chipapapa featuring 2baba. He has also won numerous local awards like the Nyasa Music awards and the Urban Music People (UMP Awards) in categories such as best live act, best video and best Male artist. In 2018, he won the UMP Fashion awards for Most Fashionable Celebrity.

== Business ventures ==
Tay is the CEO of Black Rhyno Entertainment. Under this label he signed other local artists, notably Kumbu, who is now no longer with the label. Most notable achievements of the label was bringing international artists to perform most notably Brick and Lace, Ice Prince, Sean Kingston and Naeto C. In 2016, he went to USA along with Zani Challe.

Tay Grin also launched a fruit drink called Chipapapa in 2018.

== Politics ==
In September 2018, Tay Grin announced his intentions to contest in the 2019 tripartite elections for a parliamentary seat in Lilongwe City Centre, Malawi in africa. He lost the elections.

== Personal life ==
Tay Grin is a son to Dr Jean Kalilani, a former cabinet minister and a senior official in the Malawi's Democratic Progressive Party (DPP) led government. He is not married but has a daughter from a previous relationship.
