= Gondwe (surname) =

Gondwe is an African surname. Notable people with the surname include:

- Goodall Edward Gondwe (1936–2023), Malawian economist
- Gregory Gondwe, Malawian journalist, editor and media consultant
- Lovenes Gondwe, Malawian politician
- Mimmy Gondwe (born 1977), South African politician
- Precious Gondwe, Botswana based lawyer and businesswoman
- Walije Gondwe (born 1936), Malawian novelist
- Zilanie Gondwe (born 1974), Malawian journalist and entrepreneur
