= 2019 in Malawi =

- Decades: 1990s; 2000s; 2010s; 2020s
- See also: Other events of 2019; History of Malawi

This article lists events from the year 2019 in Malawi.

== Incumbents ==
- President: Peter Mutharika
- Vice-President: Everton Chimulirenji

== Events ==
- 9 March – Flooding from the predecessor of Cyclone Idai caused 23 deaths and 11 missing in the south of the country.
- 21 May – 2019 Malawian general election: Voters head to the polls to elect the next President of Malawi.
- 27 May – Peter Mutharika of the Democratic Progressive Party wins the election with 39% of the vote, followed by Lazarus Chakwera of the Malawi Congress Party with 36% and Saulos Chilima of the United Democratic Movement with 20%.

== Deaths ==
- 26 January – Jumani Johansson, 45, Malawian-Swedish possible heir of President Hastings Banda.
- 24 March – Desmond Dudwa Phiri, 88, historian and economist.
- 17 April – Tony Bird, 74, Malawian-born South African singer-songwriter.
- 6 June – Harry Thomson, 85, politician.
- 24 November – Nelson P. W. Khonje, 95, politician, Speaker of the National Assembly (1975–1987).
