= 2026 in Malawi =

- Decades: 2000s; 2010s; 2020s
- See also: Other events of 2026; History of Malawi

This article lists events from the year 2026 in Malawi.

== Incumbents ==
- President: Peter Mutharika
- Vice-President: Jane Ansah
- Second Vice-President: Enoch Chihana

== Events ==
=== January ===
- 5 January – President Peter Mutharika reshuffles his Cabinet, abolishing the Ministry of State and reassigning several ministers, as announced by Chief Secretary to the Government Justin Sadack Saidi.
- 6 January – Researchers announce the discovery of the oldest known intentional cremation pyre in Africa at the Hora 1 archaeological site in northern Malawi, dating to about 9,500 years ago.
- 14 January – FDH Bank announces a five-year sponsorship deal worth K5 billion for the top-flight football league, renaming it the FDH Bank Premiership and ending TNM’s 18-year sponsorship of the Super League of Malawi.
- 20 January – The Malawi Energy Regulatory Authority raises petrol and diesel pump prices by more than 40%, marking one of the largest fuel price increases in recent years and prompting concerns about rising transport and living costs nationwide.
- 23 January – At least one person is reported dead while 16 others are diagnosed with cholera following an outbreak of the disease in Chilomoni, Blantyre.

=== February ===
- 2 February – President Mutharika meets Luxembourg’s Deputy Prime Minister and Minister of Foreign Affairs, Xavier Bettel, in Lilongwe, highlighting strong bilateral relations and calls for increased investment between the two countries.
- 3 February
  - The Supreme Court of Appeal rules that the Reserve Bank of Malawi must compensate Finance Bank for losses following the unlawful revocation of its licence in 2005.
  - The government declares a polio outbreak.
- 13 February – President Mutharika delivers the State of the Nation Address (SONA) and officially opens the 2026/2027 budget meeting of Parliament.
- 17 February – Authorities in Chikwawa intercept a hearse transporting 30 bags of illegally traded charcoal concealed beneath an empty coffin, valued at around £1,200. The nine suspects later escape custody.
- 24 February – President Mutharika orders a fresh inquiry into the Chikangawa plane crash that killed former Vice-President Saulos Chilima and eight others in June 2024.
- 27 February – Finance Minister Joseph Mwanamveka unveils a nearly K11 trillion national budget for the 2026/2027 financial year during a parliamentary session in Lilongwe.

=== March ===
- 19 March – At least 13 people die following four days of heavy rain, with the flooding affecting multiple regions.

=== August ===
- 9 August — The Malawi women's national football team qualifies for the 2027 FIFA Women’s World Cup, a first for any edition in its history, after defeating Ghana 2–1 in the WAFCON quarter-finals.
- 16 August — Malawi finishes second at the 2026 Women's Africa Cup of Nations after losing to Cameroon 3–0 at the final in Morocco.

=== September ===
- 17 September — A British national who was abducted in the previous week is rescued by police in Blantyre following an operation that leaves four of her abductors dead.

== Holidays ==
- 1 January – New Year's Day
- 15 January – John Chilembwe Day
- 3 March – Martyrs' Day
- 21 March – Eid al-Fitr
- 3 April – Good Friday
- 6 April – Easter Monday
- 1 May – Labour Day
- 14 May – Kamuzu Day
- 6 July – Independence Day
- 15 October – Mother's Day
- 25 December – Christmas Day
- 26 December – Boxing Day

== Deaths ==
- 8 January – Madalitso Kazombo, 46, politician, former first deputy speaker of the National Assembly.
- 4 November – Jack Mapanje, 82, writer and poet (Of Chameleons and Gods).
