= The Economist Democracy Index =

Measure of the state of democracy according to The Economist

The 2025 Economist Intelligence Unit Democracy Index map: Full democracies 9.00–10.00 8.00–8.99 No data / Flawed democracies 7.00–7.99 6.00–6.99 / Hybrid regimes 5.00–5.99 4.00–4.99 / Authoritarian regimes 3.00–3.99 2.00–2.99 1.00–1.99 0.00–0.99

The Democracy Index published by the British media company the Economist Group is an index measuring the quality of democracy across the world. This quantitative and comparative assessment is centrally concerned with democratic rights and democratic institutions. The methodology for assessing democracy used in this democracy index is according to the Economist Intelligence Unit which is part of the Economist Group, a UK-based private company, which publishes the weekly newspaper The Economist.

The index is based on 60 indicators grouped into five categories, measuring pluralism, civil liberties, and political culture. In addition to a numeric score and a ranking, the index categorizes each country into one of four regime types: full democracies, flawed democracies, hybrid regimes, and authoritarian regimes. The first Democracy Index report was published in 2006. Reports were published every two years until 2010 and annually thereafter. The index includes 167 countries and territories, of which 165 are sovereign states and 164 are UN member states. Other democracy indices with similar assessments of the state of democracy include the V-Dem Democracy Indices or Bertelsmann Transformation Index.

== Methodology ==
As described in the report, the Democracy Index produces a weighted average based on the answers to 60 questions, or indicators, each one with either two or three permitted answers. Most answers are experts' assessments. Some answers are provided by public-opinion surveys from the respective countries. In the case of countries for which survey results are missing, survey results for similar countries and expert assessments are used in order to fill in gaps.

The questions are grouped into five categories:

- electoral process and pluralism (12 indicators)
- functioning of government (14 indicators)
- political participation (9 indicators)
- political culture (8 indicators)
- civil liberties (17 indicators)

Each answer is converted to a score, either 0 or 1, or for the three-answer questions, 0, 0.5 or 1. With the exceptions mentioned below, within each category, the scores are added, multiplied by ten, and divided by the total number of questions within the category. There are a few modifying dependencies, which are explained much more precisely than the main rule procedures. In a few cases, an answer yielding zero for one question voids another question; e.g., if the elections for the national legislature and head of government are not considered free (question 1), then the next question, "Are elections... fair?", is not considered, but automatically scored zero. Likewise, there are a few questions considered so important that a low score on them yields a penalty on the total score sum for their respective categories, namely:

1. "Whether national elections are free and fair";
2. "The security of voters";
3. "The influence of foreign powers on government";
4. "The capability of the civil servants to implement policies".

The five category indices, which are listed in the report, are then averaged to find the overall score for a given country. Finally, the score, rounded to two decimals, decides the regime-type classification of the country.

The report discusses other indices of democracy, as defined, e.g., by Freedom House, and argues for some of the choices made by the team from the Economist Intelligence Unit. In this comparison, a higher emphasis is placed on the public opinion and attitudes, as measured by surveys, but on the other hand, economic living-standards are not weighted as one criterion of democracy (as seemingly some other investigators have done).

The report is widely cited in the international press as well as in peer-reviewed academic journals.

== Definitions ==
- Full democracies are countries where civil liberties and fundamental political freedoms are not only respected but also reinforced by a political culture conducive to the thriving of democratic principles. These nations have a valid system of governmental checks and balances, an independent judiciary whose decisions are enforced, governments that function adequately, and diverse and independent media. These nations have only limited problems in democratic functioning.
- Flawed democracies are countries where elections are fair and free and basic civil liberties are honoured, but may have issues (e.g. media freedom infringement and minor suppression of political opposition and critics). These countries can have significant faults in other democratic aspects, including an underdeveloped political culture, low levels of participation in politics, and issues in the functioning of governance.
- Hybrid regimes are countries with regular electoral fraud, preventing them from being fair and free democracies. These countries commonly have non-independent judiciaries, widespread corruption, and weak rule of law. Political opponents and the media face harassment and pressure from governments. These countries have a less-developed political culture, lower levels of participation in politics, and more pronounced issues in the functioning of governance compared to flawed democracies.
- Authoritarian regimes are countries where political pluralism is nonexistent or severely limited. These nations are often absolute monarchies or dictatorships and may have some conventional institutions of democracy but with meagre significance. Infringements and abuses of civil liberties are commonplace, elections (if they take place) are not fair or free (especially sham elections), the media is often state-owned or controlled by groups associated with the ruling regime, the judiciary is not independent, and censorship and suppression of governmental criticism are commonplace.

== By regime type ==
The following table indicates the number of nations and the percentage of world population for each type of regime. Some microstates are not considered in the calculation.

By regime type (2025)
Type of regime	Score	Countries		% world population	Population (2026)	Democracy Regimes vs. Hybrid Regimes vs. Authoritarian Regimes	% world population	Countries	
Type of regime	Score	Number	Percent	% world population	Number	Number	% world population	Number	Percent
Full democracies	9.00–10.00 8.00–8.99	26	15.6%	7.3%	599,577,872	3,722,255,140	45.1%	74	44.4%
Flawed democracies	7.00–7.99 6.00–6.99	48	28.7%	37.8%	3,122,677,268	3,722,255,140	45.1%	74	44.4%
Hybrid regimes	5.00–5.99 4.00–4.99	32	19.1%	14.6%	1,203,458,554		14.6%	32	19.1%
Authoritarian regimes	3.00–3.99 2.00–2.99 1.00–1.99 0.00–0.99	61	36.5%	40.3%	3,326,562,518		40.3%	61	36.5%
World	5.19	167	100%	100%	8,252,276,212		100%	167	100%

== List by region ==
The following table lists the average of each country scored by geographic region, as defined by the Economist Democracy Index.

Region	Countries	2025	2024	2023	2022	2021	2020	2019	2018	2017	2016	2015	2014	2013	2012	2011	2010	2008	2006
Western Europe	21	8.43	8.38	8.37	8.36	8.23	8.29	8.35	8.35	8.38	8.40	8.42	8.41	8.41	8.44	8.40	8.45	8.61	8.60
North America	2	8.37	8.27	8.27	8.37	8.36	8.58	8.59	8.56	8.56	8.56	8.56	8.59	8.59	8.59	8.59	8.63	8.64	8.64
Latin America and the Caribbean	24	5.71	5.61	5.68	5.79	5.83	6.09	6.13	6.24	6.26	6.33	6.37	6.36	6.38	6.36	6.35	6.37	6.43	6.37
Eastern Europe and Central Asia	28	5.33	5.35	5.37	5.39	5.36	5.36	5.42	5.42	5.40	5.43	5.55	5.58	5.53	5.51	5.50	5.55	5.67	5.76
Asia and Australasia	28	5.27	5.31	5.41	5.46	5.62	5.67	5.67	5.67	5.63	5.74	5.74	5.70	5.61	5.56	5.51	5.53	5.58	5.44
Sub-Saharan Africa	44	4.00	4.00	4.04	4.14	4.12	4.16	4.26	4.36	4.35	4.37	4.38	4.34	4.36	4.33	4.32	4.23	4.28	4.24
Middle East and North Africa	20	3.16	3.12	3.23	3.34	3.41	3.44	3.53	3.54	3.54	3.56	3.58	3.65	3.68	3.73	3.62	3.52	3.48	3.54
World	167	5.19	5.17	5.23	5.29	5.28	5.37	5.44	5.48	5.48	5.52	5.55	5.55	5.53	5.52	5.49	5.46	5.55	5.52

The following table lists the number of countries in each of the four democracy classifications.

Year 2025
Rank	Region	Countries	Authoritarian	Hybrid regime	Flawed democracy	Full democracy	Average score
1	Western Europe	21	0	1	4	16	8.43
2	North America	2	0	0	1	1	8.37
3	Latin America and the Caribbean	24	4	7	11	2	5.71
4	Asia and Australasia	28	8	6	10	4	5.33
5	Eastern Europe and Central Asia	28	8	5	13	2	5.27
6	Sub-Saharan Africa	44	24	11	8	1	4.00
7	Middle East and North Africa	20	17	2	1	0	3.16
	World	167	61	32	48	26	5.19

== List by country ==
The following table shows each nation's score over the years. The regions are assigned by the Economist Intelligence Unit, and may differ from conventional classifications (for example, Turkey is grouped in Western Europe).

Region	2025 rank	Country	Regime type	2025	2024	2023	2022	2021	2020	2019	2018	2017	2016	2015	2014	2013	2012	2011	2010	2008	2006
Asia and Australasia	167	Afghanistan	Authoritarian	0.25	0.25	0.26	0.32	0.32	2.85	2.85	2.97	2.55	2.55	2.77	2.77	2.48	2.48	2.48	2.48	3.02	3.06
Asia and Australasia	13=	Australia	Full democracy	8.85	8.85	8.66	8.71	8.90	8.96	9.09	9.09	9.09	9.01	9.01	9.01	9.13	9.22	9.22	9.22	9.09	9.09
Asia and Australasia	101	Bangladesh	Hybrid regime	4.27	4.44	5.87	5.99	5.99	5.99	5.88	5.57	5.43	5.73	5.73	5.78	5.86	5.86	5.86	5.87	5.52	6.11
Asia and Australasia	79	Bhutan	Hybrid regime	5.65	5.65	5.54	5.54	5.71	5.71	5.30	5.30	5.08	4.93	4.93	4.87	4.82	4.65	4.57	4.68	4.30	2.62
Asia and Australasia	131=	Cambodia	Authoritarian	2.70	2.94	3.05	3.18	2.90	3.10	3.53	3.59	3.63	4.27	4.27	4.78	4.60	4.96	4.87	4.87	4.87	4.77
Asia and Australasia	142	China	Authoritarian	2.24	2.11	2.12	1.94	2.21	2.27	2.26	3.32	3.10	3.18	3.14	3.00	3.00	3.00	3.14	3.14	3.04	2.97
Asia and Australasia	82	Fiji	Hybrid regime	5.39	5.39	5.55	5.55	5.61	5.72	5.85	5.85	5.85	5.64	5.69	5.61	3.61	3.67	3.67	3.62	5.11	5.66
Asia and Australasia	90	Hong Kong	Hybrid regime	5.03	5.09	5.24	5.28	5.60	5.57	6.02	6.15	6.31	6.42	6.50	6.46	6.42	6.42	5.92	5.92	5.85	6.03
Asia and Australasia	47	India	Flawed democracy	6.96	7.29	7.18	7.04	6.91	6.61	6.90	7.23	7.23	7.81	7.74	7.92	7.69	7.52	7.30	7.28	7.80	7.68
Asia and Australasia	60	Indonesia	Flawed democracy	6.37	6.44	6.53	6.71	6.71	6.30	6.48	6.39	6.39	6.97	7.03	6.95	6.82	6.76	6.53	6.53	6.34	6.41
Asia and Australasia	13=	Japan	Full democracy	8.85	8.48	8.40	8.33	8.15	8.13	7.99	7.99	7.88	7.99	7.96	8.08	8.08	8.08	8.08	8.08	8.25	8.15
Asia and Australasia	159	Laos	Authoritarian	1.71	1.71	1.71	1.77	1.77	1.77	2.14	2.37	2.37	2.37	2.21	2.21	2.21	2.32	2.10	2.10	2.10	2.10
Asia and Australasia	42	Malaysia	Flawed democracy	7.11	7.11	7.29	7.30	7.24	7.19	7.16	6.88	6.54	6.54	6.43	6.49	6.49	6.41	6.19	6.19	6.36	5.98
Asia and Australasia	57=	Mongolia	Flawed democracy	6.50	6.53	6.48	6.35	6.42	6.48	6.50	6.50	6.50	6.62	6.62	6.62	6.51	6.35	6.23	6.36	6.60	6.60
Asia and Australasia	166	Myanmar	Authoritarian	0.96	0.96	0.85	0.74	1.02	3.04	3.55	3.83	3.83	4.20	4.14	3.05	2.76	2.35	1.77	1.77	1.77	1.77
Asia and Australasia	106	Nepal	Hybrid regime	4.01	4.60	4.60	4.49	4.41	5.22	5.28	5.18	5.18	4.86	4.77	4.77	4.77	4.16	4.24	4.24	4.05	3.42
Asia and Australasia	2	New Zealand	Full democracy	9.62	9.61	9.61	9.61	9.37	9.25	9.26	9.26	9.26	9.26	9.26	9.26	9.26	9.26	9.26	9.26	9.19	9.01
Asia and Australasia	165	North Korea	Authoritarian	1.08	1.08	1.08	1.08	1.08	1.08	1.08	1.08	1.08	1.08	1.08	1.08	1.08	1.08	1.08	1.08	0.86	1.03
Asia and Australasia	139	Pakistan	Authoritarian	2.44	2.84	3.25	4.13	4.31	4.31	4.25	4.17	4.26	4.33	4.40	4.64	4.64	4.57	4.55	4.55	4.46	3.92
Asia and Australasia	75	Papua New Guinea	Hybrid regime	5.90	5.97	6.03	5.97	6.10	6.10	6.03	6.03	6.03	6.03	6.03	6.03	6.36	6.32	6.32	6.54	6.54	6.54
Asia and Australasia	62	Philippines	Flawed democracy	6.31	6.63	6.66	6.73	6.62	6.56	6.64	6.71	6.71	6.94	6.84	6.77	6.41	6.30	6.12	6.12	6.12	6.48
Asia and Australasia	68	Singapore	Flawed democracy	6.18	6.18	6.18	6.22	6.23	6.03	6.02	6.38	6.32	6.38	6.14	6.03	5.92	5.88	5.89	5.89	5.89	5.89
Asia and Australasia	32	South Korea	Flawed democracy	7.75	7.75	8.09	8.03	8.16	8.01	8.00	8.00	8.00	7.92	7.97	8.06	8.06	8.13	8.06	8.11	8.01	7.88
Asia and Australasia	56	Sri Lanka	Flawed democracy	6.57	6.19	6.17	6.47	6.14	6.14	6.27	6.19	6.48	6.48	6.42	5.69	5.69	5.75	6.58	6.64	6.61	6.58
Asia and Australasia	15	Taiwan	Full democracy	8.78	8.78	8.92	8.99	8.99	8.94	7.73	7.73	7.73	7.79	7.83	7.65	7.57	7.57	7.46	7.52	7.82	7.82
Asia and Australasia	54	Thailand	Flawed democracy	6.59	6.27	6.35	6.67	6.04	6.04	6.32	4.63	4.63	4.92	5.09	5.39	6.25	6.55	6.55	6.55	6.81	5.67
Asia and Australasia	46	Timor-Leste	Flawed democracy	6.97	7.03	7.06	7.06	7.06	7.06	7.19	7.19	7.19	7.24	7.24	7.24	7.24	7.16	7.22	7.22	7.22	6.41
Asia and Australasia	133	Vietnam	Authoritarian	2.62	2.62	2.62	2.73	2.94	2.94	3.08	3.08	3.08	3.38	3.53	3.41	3.29	2.89	2.96	2.94	2.53	2.75
Eastern Europe and Central Asia	67	Albania	Flawed democracy	6.20	6.20	6.28	6.41	6.11	6.08	5.89	5.98	5.98	5.91	5.91	5.67	5.67	5.67	5.81	5.86	5.91	5.91
Eastern Europe and Central Asia	84	Armenia	Hybrid regime	5.35	5.35	5.42	5.63	5.49	5.35	5.54	4.79	4.11	3.88	4.00	4.13	4.02	4.09	4.09	4.09	4.09	4.15
Eastern Europe and Central Asia	127	Azerbaijan	Authoritarian	2.80	2.80	2.80	2.87	2.68	2.68	2.75	2.65	2.65	2.65	2.71	2.83	3.06	3.15	3.15	3.15	3.19	3.31
Eastern Europe and Central Asia	149	Belarus	Authoritarian	1.99	1.99	1.99	1.99	2.41	2.59	2.48	3.13	3.13	3.54	3.62	3.69	3.04	3.04	3.16	3.34	3.34	3.34
Eastern Europe and Central Asia	85	Bosnia and Herzegovina	Hybrid regime	5.23	5.06	5.00	5.00	5.04	4.84	4.86	4.98	4.87	4.87	4.83	4.78	5.02	5.11	5.24	5.32	5.70	5.78
Eastern Europe and Central Asia	61	Bulgaria	Flawed democracy	6.34	6.34	6.41	6.53	6.64	6.71	7.03	7.03	7.03	7.01	7.14	6.73	6.83	6.72	6.78	6.84	7.02	7.10
Eastern Europe and Central Asia	57=	Croatia	Flawed democracy	6.50	6.50	6.50	6.50	6.50	6.50	6.57	6.57	6.63	6.75	6.93	6.93	6.93	6.93	6.73	6.81	7.04	7.04
Eastern Europe and Central Asia	23	Czech Republic	Full democracy	8.15	8.08	7.97	7.97	7.74	7.67	7.69	7.69	7.62	7.82	7.94	7.94	8.06	8.19	8.19	8.19	8.19	8.17
Eastern Europe and Central Asia	24=	Estonia	Full democracy	8.07	8.13	7.96	7.96	7.84	7.84	7.90	7.97	7.79	7.85	7.85	7.74	7.61	7.61	7.61	7.68	7.68	7.74
Eastern Europe and Central Asia	99	Georgia	Hybrid regime	4.36	4.70	5.20	5.20	5.12	5.31	5.42	5.50	5.93	5.93	5.88	5.82	5.95	5.53	4.74	4.59	4.62	4.90
Eastern Europe and Central Asia	55	Hungary	Flawed democracy	6.58	6.51	6.72	6.64	6.50	6.56	6.63	6.63	6.64	6.72	6.84	6.90	6.96	6.96	7.04	7.21	7.44	7.53
Eastern Europe and Central Asia	123	Kazakhstan	Authoritarian	2.91	3.08	3.08	3.08	3.08	3.14	2.94	2.94	3.06	3.06	3.06	3.17	3.06	2.95	3.24	3.30	3.45	3.62
Eastern Europe and Central Asia	116	Kyrgyzstan	Authoritarian	3.27	3.52	3.70	3.62	3.62	4.21	4.89	5.11	5.11	4.93	5.33	5.24	4.69	4.69	4.34	4.31	4.05	4.08
Eastern Europe and Central Asia	33	Latvia	Flawed democracy	7.73	7.66	7.38	7.37	7.31	7.24	7.49	7.38	7.25	7.31	7.37	7.48	7.05	7.05	7.05	7.05	7.23	7.37
Eastern Europe and Central Asia	39	Lithuania	Flawed democracy	7.55	7.59	7.31	7.31	7.18	7.13	7.50	7.50	7.41	7.47	7.54	7.54	7.54	7.24	7.24	7.24	7.36	7.43
Eastern Europe and Central Asia	77	Moldova	Hybrid regime	5.86	6.04	6.23	6.23	6.10	5.78	5.75	5.85	5.94	6.01	6.35	6.32	6.32	6.32	6.32	6.33	6.50	6.50
Eastern Europe and Central Asia	53	Montenegro	Flawed democracy	6.73	6.73	6.67	6.45	6.02	5.77	5.65	5.74	5.69	5.72	6.01	5.94	5.94	6.05	6.15	6.27	6.43	6.57
Eastern Europe and Central Asia	64	North Macedonia	Flawed democracy	6.28	6.28	6.03	6.10	6.03	5.89	5.97	5.87	5.57	5.23	6.02	6.25	6.16	6.16	6.16	6.16	6.21	6.33
Eastern Europe and Central Asia	34=	Poland	Flawed democracy	7.65	7.40	7.18	7.04	6.80	6.85	6.62	6.67	6.67	6.83	7.09	7.47	7.12	7.12	7.12	7.05	7.30	7.30
Eastern Europe and Central Asia	69	Romania	Flawed democracy	6.11	5.99	6.45	6.45	6.43	6.40	6.49	6.38	6.44	6.62	6.68	6.68	6.54	6.54	6.54	6.60	7.06	7.06
Eastern Europe and Central Asia	148	Russia	Authoritarian	2.03	2.03	2.22	2.28	3.24	3.31	3.11	2.94	3.17	3.24	3.31	3.39	3.59	3.74	3.92	4.26	4.48	5.02
Eastern Europe and Central Asia	63	Serbia	Flawed democracy	6.30	6.26	6.33	6.33	6.36	6.22	6.41	6.41	6.41	6.57	6.71	6.71	6.67	6.33	6.33	6.33	6.49	6.62
Eastern Europe and Central Asia	48	Slovakia	Flawed democracy	6.94	7.21	7.07	7.07	7.03	6.97	7.17	7.10	7.16	7.29	7.29	7.35	7.35	7.35	7.35	7.35	7.33	7.40
Eastern Europe and Central Asia	29	Slovenia	Flawed democracy	7.82	7.82	7.75	7.75	7.54	7.54	7.50	7.50	7.50	7.51	7.57	7.57	7.88	7.88	7.76	7.69	7.96	7.96
Eastern Europe and Central Asia	155	Tajikistan	Authoritarian	1.94	1.83	1.94	1.94	1.94	1.94	1.93	1.93	1.93	1.89	1.95	2.37	2.51	2.51	2.51	2.51	2.45	2.45
Eastern Europe and Central Asia	160	Turkmenistan	Authoritarian	1.54	1.66	1.66	1.66	1.66	1.72	1.72	1.72	1.72	1.83	1.83	1.83	1.72	1.72	1.72	1.72	1.72	1.83
Eastern Europe and Central Asia	93	Ukraine	Hybrid regime	4.79	4.90	5.06	5.42	5.57	5.81	5.90	5.69	5.69	5.70	5.70	5.42	5.84	5.91	5.94	6.30	6.94	6.94
Eastern Europe and Central Asia	146	Uzbekistan	Authoritarian	2.10	2.10	2.12	2.12	2.12	2.12	2.01	2.01	1.95	1.95	1.95	2.45	1.72	1.72	1.74	1.74	1.74	1.85
Latin America and the Caribbean	49	Argentina	Flawed democracy	6.89	6.51	6.62	6.85	6.81	6.95	7.02	7.02	6.96	6.96	7.02	6.84	6.84	6.84	6.84	6.84	6.63	6.63
Latin America and the Caribbean	83	Bolivia	Hybrid regime	5.38	4.26	4.20	4.51	4.65	5.08	4.84	5.70	5.49	5.63	5.75	5.79	5.79	5.84	5.84	5.92	6.15	5.98
Latin America and the Caribbean	50	Brazil	Flawed democracy	6.76	6.49	6.68	6.78	6.86	6.92	6.86	6.97	6.86	6.90	6.96	7.38	7.12	7.12	7.12	7.12	7.38	7.38
Latin America and the Caribbean	27	Chile	Flawed democracy	7.97	7.83	7.98	8.22	7.92	8.28	8.08	7.97	7.84	7.78	7.84	7.80	7.80	7.54	7.54	7.67	7.89	7.89
Latin America and the Caribbean	73=	Colombia	Flawed democracy	6.04	6.35	6.55	6.72	6.48	7.04	7.13	6.96	6.67	6.67	6.62	6.55	6.55	6.63	6.63	6.55	6.54	6.40
Latin America and the Caribbean	19	Costa Rica	Full democracy	8.29	8.29	8.29	8.29	8.07	8.16	8.13	8.07	7.88	7.88	7.96	8.03	8.03	8.10	8.10	8.04	8.04	8.04
Latin America and the Caribbean	135	Cuba	Authoritarian	2.58	2.58	2.65	2.65	2.59	2.84	2.84	3.00	3.31	3.46	3.52	3.52	3.52	3.52	3.52	3.52	3.52	3.52
Latin America and the Caribbean	51	Dominican Republic	Flawed democracy	6.75	6.62	6.44	6.39	6.45	6.32	6.54	6.54	6.66	6.67	6.67	6.67	6.74	6.49	6.20	6.20	6.20	6.13
Latin America and the Caribbean	86	Ecuador	Hybrid regime	5.20	5.24	5.41	5.69	5.71	6.13	6.33	6.27	6.02	5.81	5.87	5.87	5.87	5.78	5.72	5.77	5.64	5.64
Latin America and the Caribbean	96	El Salvador	Hybrid regime	4.57	4.61	4.71	5.06	5.72	5.90	6.15	5.96	6.43	6.64	6.64	6.53	6.53	6.47	6.47	6.47	6.40	6.22
Latin America and the Caribbean	94=	Guatemala	Hybrid regime	4.65	4.55	4.47	4.68	4.62	4.97	5.26	5.60	5.86	5.92	5.92	5.81	5.81	5.88	5.88	6.05	6.07	6.07
Latin America and the Caribbean	71	Guyana	Flawed democracy	6.09	6.11	6.26	6.34	6.25	6.01	6.15	6.67	6.46	6.25	6.05	5.91	6.05	6.05	6.05	6.05	6.12	6.15
Latin America and the Caribbean	125=	Haiti	Authoritarian	2.81	2.74	2.81	2.81	3.48	4.22	4.57	4.91	4.03	4.02	3.94	3.82	3.94	3.96	4.00	4.00	4.19	4.19
Latin America and the Caribbean	92	Honduras	Hybrid regime	4.87	4.98	4.98	5.15	5.10	5.36	5.42	5.63	5.72	5.92	5.84	5.84	5.84	5.84	5.84	5.76	6.18	6.25
Latin America and the Caribbean	52	Jamaica	Flawed democracy	6.74	6.74	7.06	7.13	7.13	7.13	6.96	7.02	7.29	7.39	7.39	7.39	7.39	7.39	7.13	7.21	7.21	7.34
Latin America and the Caribbean	81	Mexico	Hybrid regime	5.40	5.32	5.14	5.25	5.57	6.07	6.09	6.19	6.41	6.47	6.55	6.68	6.91	6.90	6.93	6.93	6.78	6.67
Latin America and the Caribbean	150=	Nicaragua	Authoritarian	1.97	2.09	2.26	2.50	2.69	3.60	3.55	3.63	4.66	4.81	5.26	5.32	5.46	5.56	5.56	5.73	6.07	5.68
Latin America and the Caribbean	44	Panama	Flawed democracy	7.04	6.84	6.91	6.91	6.85	7.18	7.05	7.05	7.08	7.13	7.19	7.08	7.08	7.08	7.08	7.15	7.35	7.35
Latin America and the Caribbean	73=	Paraguay	Flawed democracy	6.04	5.92	6.00	5.89	5.86	6.18	6.24	6.24	6.31	6.27	6.33	6.26	6.26	6.26	6.40	6.40	6.40	6.16
Latin America and the Caribbean	76	Peru	Hybrid regime	5.88	5.69	5.81	5.92	6.09	6.53	6.60	6.60	6.49	6.65	6.58	6.54	6.54	6.47	6.59	6.40	6.31	6.11
Latin America and the Caribbean	45	Suriname	Flawed democracy	7.03	6.79	6.88	6.95	6.82	6.82	6.98	6.98	6.76	6.77	6.77	6.77	6.77	6.65	6.65	6.65	6.58	6.52
Latin America and the Caribbean	43	Trinidad and Tobago	Flawed democracy	7.09	7.09	7.16	7.16	7.16	7.16	7.16	7.16	7.04	7.10	7.10	6.99	6.99	6.99	7.16	7.16	7.21	7.18
Latin America and the Caribbean	12	Uruguay	Full democracy	8.92	8.67	8.66	8.91	8.85	8.61	8.38	8.38	8.12	8.17	8.17	8.17	8.17	8.17	8.17	8.10	8.08	7.96
Latin America and the Caribbean	144=	Venezuela	Authoritarian	2.13	2.25	2.31	2.23	2.11	2.76	2.88	3.16	3.87	4.68	5.00	5.07	5.07	5.15	5.08	5.18	5.34	5.42
Middle East and North Africa	110	Algeria	Authoritarian	3.55	3.55	3.66	3.66	3.77	3.77	4.01	3.50	3.56	3.56	3.95	3.83	3.83	3.83	3.44	3.44	3.32	3.17
Middle East and North Africa	138	Bahrain	Authoritarian	2.45	2.45	2.52	2.52	2.52	2.49	2.55	2.71	2.71	2.79	2.79	2.87	2.87	2.53	2.92	3.49	3.38	3.53
Middle East and North Africa	128=	Egypt	Authoritarian	2.79	2.79	2.93	2.93	2.93	2.93	3.06	3.36	3.36	3.31	3.18	3.16	3.27	4.56	3.95	3.07	3.89	3.90
Middle East and North Africa	152	Iran	Authoritarian	1.96	1.96	1.96	1.96	1.95	2.20	2.38	2.45	2.45	2.34	2.16	1.98	1.98	1.98	1.98	1.94	2.83	2.93
Middle East and North Africa	119=	Iraq	Authoritarian	3.13	2.80	2.88	3.13	3.51	3.62	3.74	4.06	4.09	4.08	4.08	4.23	4.10	4.10	4.03	4.00	4.00	4.01
Middle East and North Africa	30	Israel	Flawed democracy	7.80	7.80	7.80	7.93	7.97	7.84	7.86	7.79	7.79	7.85	7.77	7.63	7.53	7.53	7.53	7.48	7.48	7.28
Middle East and North Africa	115	Jordan	Authoritarian	3.28	3.28	3.04	3.17	3.49	3.62	3.93	3.93	3.87	3.96	3.86	3.76	3.76	3.76	3.89	3.74	3.93	3.92
Middle East and North Africa	130	Kuwait	Authoritarian	2.78	2.78	3.50	3.83	3.91	3.80	3.93	3.85	3.85	3.85	3.85	3.78	3.78	3.78	3.74	3.88	3.39	3.09
Middle East and North Africa	109	Lebanon	Authoritarian	3.81	3.56	3.56	3.64	3.84	4.16	4.36	4.63	4.72	4.86	4.86	5.12	5.05	5.05	5.32	5.82	5.62	5.82
Middle East and North Africa	141	Libya	Authoritarian	2.31	2.31	1.78	2.06	1.95	1.95	2.02	2.19	2.32	2.25	2.25	3.80	4.82	5.15	3.55	1.94	2.00	1.84
Middle East and North Africa	91	Morocco	Hybrid regime	4.97	4.97	5.04	5.04	5.04	5.04	5.10	4.99	4.87	4.77	4.66	4.00	4.07	4.07	3.83	3.79	3.88	3.90
Middle East and North Africa	121	Oman	Authoritarian	3.05	3.05	3.12	3.12	3.00	3.00	3.06	3.04	3.04	3.04	3.04	3.15	3.26	3.26	3.26	2.86	2.98	2.77
Middle East and North Africa	112	Palestine	Authoritarian	3.44	3.44	3.47	3.86	3.94	3.83	3.89	4.39	4.46	4.49	4.57	4.72	4.80	4.80	4.97	5.44	5.83	6.01
Middle East and North Africa	118	Qatar	Authoritarian	3.17	3.17	3.65	3.65	3.65	3.24	3.19	3.19	3.19	3.18	3.18	3.18	3.18	3.18	3.18	3.09	2.92	2.78
Middle East and North Africa	147	Saudi Arabia	Authoritarian	2.08	2.08	2.08	2.08	2.08	2.08	1.93	1.93	1.93	1.93	1.93	1.82	1.82	1.71	1.77	1.84	1.90	1.92
Middle East and North Africa	161	Sudan	Authoritarian	1.46	1.46	1.76	2.47	2.47	2.54	2.70	2.15	2.15	2.37	2.37	2.54	2.54	2.38	2.38	2.42	2.81	2.90
Middle East and North Africa	162=	Syria	Authoritarian	1.37	1.32	1.43	1.43	1.43	1.43	1.43	1.43	1.43	1.43	1.43	1.74	1.86	1.63	1.99	2.31	2.18	2.36
Middle East and North Africa	94=	Tunisia	Hybrid regime	4.65	4.71	5.51	5.51	5.99	6.59	6.72	6.41	6.32	6.40	6.72	6.31	5.76	5.67	5.53	2.79	2.96	3.06
Middle East and North Africa	117	United Arab Emirates	Authoritarian	3.18	3.07	3.01	2.90	2.90	2.70	2.76	2.76	2.69	2.75	2.75	2.64	2.52	2.58	2.58	2.52	2.60	2.42
Middle East and North Africa	153=	Yemen	Authoritarian	1.95	1.95	1.95	1.95	1.95	1.95	1.95	1.95	2.07	2.07	2.24	2.79	2.79	3.12	2.57	2.64	2.95	2.98
Sub-Saharan Africa	107	Angola	Authoritarian	3.94	4.05	4.18	3.96	3.37	3.66	3.72	3.62	3.62	3.40	3.35	3.35	3.35	3.35	3.32	3.32	3.35	2.41
Sub-Saharan Africa	102=	Benin	Hybrid regime	4.26	4.44	4.68	4.28	4.19	4.58	5.09	5.74	5.61	5.67	5.72	5.65	5.87	6.00	6.06	6.17	6.06	6.16
Sub-Saharan Africa	36	Botswana	Flawed democracy	7.63	7.63	7.73	7.73	7.73	7.62	7.81	7.81	7.81	7.87	7.87	7.87	7.98	7.85	7.63	7.63	7.47	7.60
Sub-Saharan Africa	137	Burkina Faso	Authoritarian	2.55	2.55	2.73	3.08	3.84	3.73	4.04	4.75	4.75	4.70	4.70	4.09	4.15	3.52	3.59	3.59	3.60	3.72
Sub-Saharan Africa	144=	Burundi	Authoritarian	2.13	2.13	2.13	2.13	2.13	2.14	2.15	2.33	2.33	2.40	2.49	3.33	3.41	3.60	4.01	4.01	4.51	4.51
Sub-Saharan Africa	37=	Cape Verde	Flawed democracy	7.58	7.58	7.65	7.65	7.65	7.65	7.78	7.88	7.88	7.94	7.81	7.81	7.92	7.92	7.92	7.94	7.81	7.43
Sub-Saharan Africa	136	Cameroon	Authoritarian	2.56	2.56	2.56	2.56	2.56	2.77	2.85	3.28	3.61	3.46	3.66	3.41	3.41	3.44	3.41	3.41	3.46	3.27
Sub-Saharan Africa	164	Central African Republic	Authoritarian	1.18	1.18	1.18	1.35	1.43	1.32	1.32	1.52	1.52	1.61	1.57	1.49	1.49	1.99	1.82	1.82	1.86	1.61
Sub-Saharan Africa	158	Chad	Authoritarian	1.76	1.89	1.67	1.67	1.67	1.55	1.61	1.61	1.50	1.50	1.50	1.50	1.50	1.62	1.62	1.52	1.52	1.65
Sub-Saharan Africa	125=	Comoros	Authoritarian	2.81	2.84	3.04	3.20	3.20	3.09	3.15	3.71	3.71	3.71	3.71	3.52	3.52	3.52	3.52	3.41	3.58	3.90
Sub-Saharan Africa	128=	Republic of the Congo	Authoritarian	2.79	2.79	2.79	2.79	2.79	3.11	3.11	3.31	3.25	2.91	2.91	2.89	2.89	2.89	2.89	2.89	2.94	3.19
Sub-Saharan Africa	104	Ivory Coast	Hybrid regime	4.24	4.22	4.22	4.22	4.22	4.11	4.05	4.15	3.93	3.81	3.31	3.53	3.25	3.25	3.08	3.02	3.27	3.38
Sub-Saharan Africa	156=	Democratic Republic of the Congo	Authoritarian	1.92	1.92	1.68	1.48	1.40	1.13	1.13	1.49	1.61	1.93	2.11	1.75	1.83	1.92	2.15	2.15	2.28	2.76
Sub-Saharan Africa	131=	Djibouti	Authoritarian	2.70	2.70	2.70	2.74	2.74	2.71	2.77	2.87	2.76	2.83	2.90	2.99	2.96	2.74	2.68	2.20	2.37	2.37
Sub-Saharan Africa	156=	Equatorial Guinea	Authoritarian	1.92	1.92	1.92	1.92	1.92	1.92	1.92	1.92	1.81	1.70	1.77	1.66	1.77	1.83	1.77	1.84	2.19	2.09
Sub-Saharan Africa	150=	Eritrea	Authoritarian	1.97	1.97	1.97	2.03	2.03	2.15	2.37	2.37	2.37	2.37	2.37	2.44	2.40	2.40	2.34	2.31	2.31	2.31
Sub-Saharan Africa	134	Eswatini	Authoritarian	2.60	2.60	2.78	3.01	3.08	3.08	3.14	3.03	3.03	3.03	3.09	3.09	3.20	3.20	3.26	2.90	3.04	2.93
Sub-Saharan Africa	119=	Ethiopia	Authoritarian	3.13	3.24	3.37	3.17	3.30	3.38	3.44	3.35	3.42	3.60	3.83	3.72	3.83	3.72	3.79	3.68	4.52	4.72
Sub-Saharan Africa	111	Gabon	Authoritarian	3.49	2.18	2.18	3.40	3.40	3.54	3.61	3.61	3.61	3.74	3.76	3.76	3.76	3.56	3.48	3.29	3.00	2.72
Sub-Saharan Africa	97	Gambia	Hybrid regime	4.47	4.47	4.47	4.47	4.41	4.49	4.33	4.31	4.06	2.91	2.97	3.05	3.31	3.31	3.38	3.38	4.19	4.39
Sub-Saharan Africa	65	Ghana	Flawed democracy	6.24	6.24	6.30	6.43	6.50	6.50	6.63	6.63	6.69	6.75	6.86	6.33	6.33	6.02	6.02	6.02	5.35	5.35
Sub-Saharan Africa	143	Guinea	Authoritarian	2.15	2.04	2.21	2.32	2.28	3.08	3.14	3.14	3.14	3.14	3.14	3.01	2.84	2.79	2.79	2.79	2.09	2.02
Sub-Saharan Africa	162=	Guinea-Bissau	Authoritarian	1.37	2.03	2.45	2.56	2.75	2.63	2.63	1.98	1.98	1.98	1.93	1.93	1.26	1.43	1.99	1.99	1.99	2.00
Sub-Saharan Africa	89	Kenya	Hybrid regime	5.05	5.05	5.05	5.05	5.05	5.05	5.18	5.11	5.11	5.33	5.33	5.13	5.13	4.71	4.71	4.71	4.79	5.08
Sub-Saharan Africa	66	Lesotho	Flawed democracy	6.23	6.06	6.06	6.19	6.30	6.30	6.54	6.64	6.64	6.59	6.59	6.66	6.66	6.66	6.33	6.02	6.29	6.48
Sub-Saharan Africa	80	Liberia	Hybrid regime	5.57	5.57	5.57	5.43	5.43	5.32	5.45	5.35	5.23	5.31	4.95	4.95	4.95	4.95	5.07	5.07	5.25	5.22
Sub-Saharan Africa	88	Madagascar	Hybrid regime	5.06	5.33	5.26	5.70	5.70	5.70	5.64	5.22	5.11	5.07	4.85	4.42	4.32	3.93	3.93	3.94	5.57	5.82
Sub-Saharan Africa	70	Malawi	Flawed democracy	6.10	5.85	5.85	5.91	5.74	5.74	5.50	5.49	5.49	5.55	5.55	5.66	6.00	6.08	5.84	5.84	5.13	4.97
Sub-Saharan Africa	140	Mali	Authoritarian	2.40	2.40	2.58	3.23	3.48	3.93	4.92	5.41	5.64	5.70	5.70	5.79	5.90	5.12	6.36	6.01	5.87	5.99
Sub-Saharan Africa	108	Mauritania	Authoritarian	3.84	3.96	4.14	4.03	4.03	3.92	3.92	3.82	3.82	3.96	3.96	4.17	4.17	4.17	4.17	3.86	3.91	3.12
Sub-Saharan Africa	21	Mauritius	Full democracy	8.23	8.23	8.14	8.14	8.08	8.14	8.22	8.22	8.22	8.28	8.27	8.17	8.17	8.17	8.04	8.04	8.04	8.04
Sub-Saharan Africa	113	Mozambique	Authoritarian	3.38	3.38	3.51	3.51	3.51	3.51	3.65	3.85	4.02	4.02	4.60	4.66	4.77	4.88	4.90	4.90	5.49	5.28
Sub-Saharan Africa	59	Namibia	Flawed democracy	6.48	6.48	6.52	6.52	6.52	6.52	6.43	6.25	6.31	6.31	6.31	6.24	6.24	6.24	6.24	6.23	6.48	6.54
Sub-Saharan Africa	153=	Niger	Authoritarian	1.95	2.26	2.37	3.73	3.22	3.29	3.29	3.76	3.76	3.96	4.62	4.02	4.08	4.16	4.16	3.38	3.41	3.54
Sub-Saharan Africa	105	Nigeria	Hybrid regime	4.10	4.16	4.23	4.23	4.11	4.10	4.12	4.44	4.44	4.50	3.85	3.76	3.77	3.77	3.83	3.47	3.53	3.52
Sub-Saharan Africa	114	Rwanda	Authoritarian	3.34	3.34	3.30	3.10	3.10	3.10	3.16	3.35	3.19	3.07	3.07	3.25	3.38	3.36	3.25	3.25	3.71	3.82
Sub-Saharan Africa	72	Senegal	Flawed democracy	6.05	5.93	5.48	5.72	5.53	5.67	5.81	6.15	6.15	6.21	6.08	6.15	6.15	6.09	5.51	5.27	5.37	5.37
Sub-Saharan Africa	98	Sierra Leone	Hybrid regime	4.44	4.32	4.32	5.03	4.97	4.86	4.86	4.66	4.66	4.55	4.55	4.56	4.64	4.71	4.51	4.51	4.11	3.57
Sub-Saharan Africa	41	South Africa	Flawed democracy	7.16	7.16	7.05	7.05	7.05	7.05	7.24	7.24	7.24	7.41	7.56	7.82	7.90	7.79	7.79	7.79	7.91	7.91
Sub-Saharan Africa	87	Tanzania	Hybrid regime	5.13	5.20	5.35	5.10	5.10	5.10	5.16	5.41	5.47	5.76	5.58	5.77	5.77	5.88	5.64	5.64	5.28	5.18
Sub-Saharan Africa	124	Togo	Authoritarian	2.88	2.99	2.99	2.99	2.80	2.80	3.30	3.10	3.05	3.32	3.41	3.45	3.45	3.45	3.45	3.45	2.43	1.75
Sub-Saharan Africa	100	Uganda	Hybrid regime	4.31	4.49	4.49	4.55	4.48	4.94	5.02	5.20	5.09	5.26	5.22	5.22	5.22	5.16	5.13	5.05	5.03	5.14
Sub-Saharan Africa	78	Zambia	Hybrid regime	5.82	5.73	5.80	5.80	5.72	4.86	5.09	5.61	5.68	5.99	6.28	6.39	6.26	6.26	6.19	5.68	5.25	5.25
Sub-Saharan Africa	122	Zimbabwe	Authoritarian	2.98	2.98	3.04	2.92	2.92	3.16	3.16	3.16	3.16	3.05	3.05	2.78	2.67	2.67	2.68	2.64	2.53	2.62
North America	9=	Canada	Full democracy	9.08	8.69	8.69	8.88	8.87	9.24	9.22	9.15	9.15	9.15	9.08	9.08	9.08	9.08	9.08	9.08	9.07	9.07
North America	34=	United States	Flawed democracy	7.65	7.85	7.85	7.85	7.85	7.92	7.96	7.96	7.98	7.98	8.05	8.11	8.11	8.11	8.11	8.18	8.22	8.22
Western Europe	17	Austria	Full democracy	8.42	8.28	8.28	8.20	8.07	8.16	8.29	8.29	8.42	8.41	8.54	8.54	8.48	8.62	8.49	8.49	8.49	8.69
Western Europe	31	Belgium	Flawed democracy	7.77	7.64	7.64	7.64	7.51	7.51	7.64	7.78	7.78	7.77	7.93	7.93	8.05	8.05	8.05	8.05	8.16	8.15
Western Europe	40	Cyprus	Flawed democracy	7.45	7.38	7.38	7.38	7.43	7.56	7.59	7.59	7.59	7.65	7.53	7.40	7.29	7.29	7.29	7.29	7.70	7.60
Western Europe	3	Denmark	Full democracy	9.42	9.28	9.28	9.28	9.09	9.15	9.22	9.22	9.22	9.20	9.11	9.11	9.38	9.52	9.52	9.52	9.52	9.52
Western Europe	5	Finland	Full democracy	9.37	9.30	9.30	9.29	9.27	9.20	9.25	9.14	9.03	9.03	9.03	9.03	9.03	9.06	9.06	9.19	9.25	9.25
Western Europe	26	France	Full democracy	8.05	7.99	8.07	8.07	7.99	7.99	8.12	7.80	7.80	7.92	7.92	8.04	7.92	7.88	7.77	7.77	8.07	8.07
Western Europe	16	Germany	Full democracy	8.73	8.73	8.80	8.80	8.67	8.67	8.68	8.68	8.61	8.63	8.64	8.64	8.31	8.34	8.34	8.38	8.82	8.82
Western Europe	24=	Greece	Full democracy	8.07	8.07	8.14	7.97	7.56	7.39	7.43	7.29	7.29	7.23	7.45	7.45	7.65	7.65	7.65	7.92	8.13	8.13
Western Europe	4	Iceland	Full democracy	9.38	9.38	9.45	9.52	9.18	9.37	9.58	9.58	9.58	9.50	9.58	9.58	9.65	9.65	9.65	9.65	9.65	9.71
Western Europe	7	Ireland	Full democracy	9.33	9.19	9.19	9.13	9.00	9.05	9.24	9.15	9.15	9.15	8.85	8.72	8.68	8.56	8.56	8.79	9.01	9.01
Western Europe	37=	Italy	Flawed democracy	7.58	7.58	7.69	7.69	7.68	7.74	7.52	7.71	7.98	7.98	7.98	7.85	7.85	7.74	7.74	7.83	7.98	7.73
Western Europe	9=	Luxembourg	Full democracy	9.08	8.88	8.81	8.81	8.68	8.68	8.81	8.81	8.81	8.81	8.88	8.88	8.88	8.88	8.88	8.88	9.10	9.10
Western Europe	28	Malta	Flawed democracy	7.93	7.93	7.93	7.70	7.57	7.68	7.95	8.21	8.15	8.39	8.39	8.39	8.28	8.28	8.28	8.28	8.39	8.39
Western Europe	11	Netherlands	Full democracy	8.93	9.00	9.00	9.00	8.88	8.96	9.01	8.89	8.89	8.80	8.92	8.92	8.84	8.99	8.99	8.99	9.53	9.66
Western Europe	1	Norway	Full democracy	9.81	9.81	9.81	9.81	9.75	9.81	9.87	9.87	9.87	9.93	9.93	9.93	9.93	9.93	9.80	9.80	9.68	9.55
Western Europe	20	Portugal	Full democracy	8.28	8.08	7.75	7.95	7.82	7.90	8.03	7.84	7.84	7.86	7.79	7.79	7.65	7.92	7.81	8.02	8.05	8.16
Western Europe	22	Spain	Full democracy	8.20	8.13	8.07	8.07	7.94	8.12	8.29	8.08	8.08	8.30	8.30	8.05	8.02	8.02	8.02	8.16	8.45	8.34
Western Europe	6	Sweden	Full democracy	9.35	9.39	9.39	9.39	9.26	9.26	9.39	9.39	9.39	9.39	9.45	9.73	9.73	9.73	9.50	9.50	9.88	9.88
Western Europe	8	Switzerland	Full democracy	9.32	9.32	9.14	9.14	8.90	8.83	9.03	9.03	9.03	9.09	9.09	9.09	9.09	9.09	9.09	9.09	9.15	9.02
Western Europe	102=	Turkey	Hybrid regime	4.26	4.26	4.33	4.35	4.35	4.48	4.09	4.37	4.88	5.04	5.12	5.12	5.63	5.76	5.73	5.73	5.69	5.70
Western Europe	18	United Kingdom	Full democracy	8.34	8.34	8.28	8.28	8.10	8.54	8.52	8.53	8.53	8.36	8.31	8.31	8.31	8.21	8.16	8.16	8.15	8.08

== Components ==
The following table shows the five parameters that made up the score of each nation in 2024 and the changes that had occurred since 2025.

Year 2025
Rank	Δ Rank	Country	Regime type	Overall score	Δ Score	Electoral process and pluralism	Functioning of government	Political participation	Political culture	Civil liberties
Full democracies
1	Steady	Norway	Full democracy	9.81	Steady	10.00	9.64	10.00	10.00	9.41
2	Steady	New Zealand	Full democracy	9.62	▲0.01	10.00	9.29	10.00	8.75	10.00
3	▲4	Denmark	Full democracy	9.42	▲0.14	10.00	9.29	8.33	9.38	9.41
4	Steady	Iceland	Full democracy	9.38	Steady	10.00	8.93	8.89	9.38	9.71
5	▲1	Finland	Full democracy	9.37	▲0.07	10.00	9.64	7.78	9.38	9.71
6	▼3	Sweden	Full democracy	9.35	▼0.04	9.58	9.64	8.33	10.00	9.41
7	▲1	Ireland	Full democracy	9.33	▲0.14	10.00	8.21	8.33	10.00	9.41
8	▼3	Switzerland	Full democracy	9.32	Steady	9.58	9.29	8.33	10.00	9.41
9=	▲5	Canada	Full democracy	9.08	▲0.39	10.00	8.21	8.89	7.50	8.82
9=	▲1	Luxembourg	Full democracy	9.08	▲0.20	10.00	9.29	6.67	8.75	9.71
11	▼2	Netherlands	Full democracy	8.93	▼0.07	9.58	8.93	8.33	8.75	9.41
12	▲3	Uruguay	Full democracy	8.92	▲0.25	10.00	9.29	7.78	6.88	9.41
13=	▼2	Australia	Full democracy	8.85	Steady	10.00	8.57	7.22	8.75	9.71
13=	▲3	Japan	Full democracy	8.85	▲0.37	9.58	8.93	6.67	8.13	9.12
15	▼3	Taiwan	Full democracy	8.78	Steady	10.00	8.57	7.78	8.13	9.41
16	▼3	Germany	Full democracy	8.73	Steady	9.58	8.21	8.33	8.13	9.41
17	▲2	Austria	Full democracy	8.42	▲0.14	9.58	7.50	8.89	6.88	8.53
18	Steady	United Kingdom	Full democracy	8.34	Steady	9.58	7.50	8.33	6.88	9.41
19	▼1	Costa Rica	Full democracy	8.29	Steady	9.58	7.50	7.78	6.88	9.71
20	▲4	Portugal	Full democracy	8.28	▲0.20	9.58	7.14	6.11	8.75	8.82
21	▼1	Mauritius	Full democracy	8.23	Steady	9.58	7.86	6.11	8.75	8.82
22	Steady	Spain	Full democracy	8.20	▲0.07	9.58	7.50	7.22	7.50	8.82
23	Steady	Czech Republic	Full democracy	8.15	▲0.07	9.58	6.43	7.78	7.50	9.12
24=	▼3	Estonia	Full democracy	8.07	▼0.06	10.00	8.57	6.67	6.88	8.53
24=	▲1	Greece	Full democracy	8.07	Steady	10.00	6.79	7.22	7.50	8.82
26	Steady	France	Full democracy	8.05	▲0.06	9.58	7.50	7.78	6.88	8.24
Flawed democracies
27	▲2	Chile	Flawed democracy	7.97	▲0.14	9.58	7.86	6.67	5.63	9.41
28	▼1	Malta	Flawed democracy	7.93	Steady	9.17	7.14	6.67	8.13	8.53
29	▲1	Slovenia	Flawed democracy	7.82	Steady	9.58	7.50	7.22	6.25	8.53
30	▲1	Israel	Flawed democracy	7.80	Steady	9.58	7.50	9.44	6.88	5.59
31	▲3	Belgium	Flawed democracy	7.77	▲0.13	9.58	8.21	5.00	6.88	8.53
32	Steady	South Korea	Flawed democracy	7.75	Steady	9.58	7.50	7.22	5.63	8.82
33	Steady	Latvia	Flawed democracy	7.73	▲0.07	10.00	7.14	6.67	6.25	8.24
34	▲5	Poland	Flawed democracy	7.65	▲0.25	10.00	6.43	6.67	6.25	7.65
35	▼7	United States	Flawed democracy	7.65	▼0.20	9.17	6.43	8.89	6.25	8.53
36	▼1	Botswana	Flawed democracy	7.63	Steady	9.58	6.43	6.11	7.50	8.53
37	Steady	Cape Verde	Flawed democracy	7.58	Steady	9.17	6.64	6.67	6.88	8.53
38	Steady	Italy	Flawed democracy	7.58	Steady	9.58	7.14	7.22	6.88	7.06
39	▼3	Lithuania	Flawed democracy	7.55	▼0.04	10.00	7.14	6.67	5.63	8.53
40	Steady	Cyprus	Flawed democracy	7.45	▲0.07	9.17	5.36	6.67	6.88	8.82
41	▲2	South Africa	Flawed democracy	7.16	Steady	9.17	6.79	7.78	5.00	7.06
42	▲2	Malaysia	Flawed democracy	7.11	Steady	9.58	7.14	6.67	6.25	5.88
43	▲2	Trinidad and Tobago	Flawed democracy	7.09	Steady	9.58	6.79	6.11	5.63	7.35
44	▲3	Panama	Flawed democracy	7.04	▲0.20	9.58	5.71	7.22	3.75	7.94
45	▲3	Suriname	Flawed democracy	7.03	▲0.24	9.58	5.36	6.67	5.00	7.35
46	Steady	Timor-Leste	Flawed democracy	6.97	▼0.06	9.58	6.07	5.56	6.88	7.06
47	▼6	India	Flawed democracy	6.96	▼0.33	8.67	7.50	7.22	6.88	6.18
48	▼6	Slovakia	Flawed democracy	6.94	▼0.27	10.00	6.07	6.11	5.63	8.24
49	▲5	Argentina	Flawed democracy	6.89	▲0.38	9.17	5.00	6.11	3.75	8.53
50	▲7	Brazil	Flawed democracy	6.76	▲0.27	9.58	5.00	6.11	5.00	6.76
51	▲1	Dominican Republic	Flawed democracy	6.75	▲0.13	9.17	5.00	7.22	4.38	7.35
52	▼3	Jamaica	Flawed democracy	6.74	Steady	8.75	6.43	5.00	5.00	8.53
53	▼3	Montenegro	Flawed democracy	6.73	Steady	8.75	7.14	6.67	3.75	7.35
54	▲9	Thailand	Flawed democracy	6.59	▲0.32	6.50	5.00	8.33	5.63	5.88
55	Steady	Hungary	Flawed democracy	6.58	▲0.07	8.75	5.71	4.44	6.88	6.76
56	▲11	Sri Lanka	Flawed democracy	6.57	▲0.38	7.00	4.29	7.22	6.25	6.18
57	▼1	Croatia	Flawed democracy	6.50	Steady	9.17	6.07	6.11	4.38	6.76
58	▼5	Mongolia	Flawed democracy	6.50	▼0.03	8.75	5.71	6.67	5.63	5.88
59	▼1	Namibia	Flawed democracy	6.48	Steady	7.42	5.36	6.67	5.00	7.94
60	▼1	Indonesia	Flawed democracy	6.37	▼0.07	7.92	6.79	7.22	5.00	5.29
61	Steady	Bulgaria	Flawed democracy	6.34	Steady	8.75	5.36	5.56	4.38	7.65
62	▼11	Philippines	Flawed democracy	6.31	▼0.32	8.75	4.64	8.33	4.38	7.06
63	▲1	Serbia	Flawed democracy	6.30	▲0.04	7.83	5.71	6.67	3.75	7.35
64	▼2	North Macedonia	Flawed democracy	6.28	Steady	8.75	6.07	6.11	3.13	7.35
65	Steady	Ghana	Flawed democracy	6.24	Steady	8.33	4.64	6.11	6.25	5.88
70	▲1	Lesotho	Flawed democracy	6.23	▲0.17	9.17	3.79	5.56	5.63	6.18
66	Steady	Albania	Flawed democracy	6.20	Steady	7.00	5.71	5.00	6.25	7.06
68	▲1	Singapore	Flawed democracy	6.18	Steady	5.33	7.14	4.44	7.50	6.47
72	▼12	Romania	Flawed democracy	6.11	▲0.12	8.25	5.36	5.56	3.75	7.06
76	Steady	Malawi	Flawed democracy	6.10	▲0.25	7.00	4.29	5.56	6.25	6.18
69	▼2	Guyana	Flawed democracy	6.09	▼0.02	6.92	6.07	6.11	5.00	6.47
74	▲9	Senegal	Flawed democracy	6.05	▲0.12	7.42	5.36	4.44	6.25	6.18
60	▼5	Colombia	Flawed democracy	6.04	▼0.31	9.17	5.71	6.11	3.13	7.65
73	▼1	Paraguay	Flawed democracy	6.04	▲0.12	8.33	5.36	6.67	1.88	7.35
Hybrid regimes
73	▼1	Papua New Guinea	Hybrid regime	5.90	▼0.07	6.92	6.07	3.89	5.63	7.35
76	▼1	Peru	Hybrid regime	5.88	▲0.19	8.75	5.71	5.00	2.50	6.47
71	▼3	Moldova	Hybrid regime	5.86	▼0.18	6.50	5.36	7.22	4.38	6.76
77	▲1	Zambia	Hybrid regime	5.82	▲0.09	7.92	3.29	5.00	6.88	5.59
79	▲2	Bhutan	Hybrid regime	5.65	Steady	8.75	5.93	3.89	5.00	4.71
80	▼1	Liberia	Hybrid regime	5.57	Steady	7.83	2.71	6.11	5.63	5.59
84	▲6	Mexico	Hybrid regime	5.40	▲0.08	6.92	5.00	7.22	1.88	5.59
81	▼1	Fiji	Hybrid regime	5.39	Steady	6.58	5.00	4.44	5.63	5.29
103	▲3	Bolivia	Hybrid regime	5.38	▲1.12	4.33	3.93	5.56	1.88	5.59
82	▲2	Armenia	Hybrid regime	5.35	Steady	7.92	4.29	6.11	3.13	5.29
88	▲6	Bosnia and Herzegovina	Hybrid regime	5.23	▲0.17	7.00	3.64	5.00	3.75	5.88
85	Steady	Ecuador	Hybrid regime	5.20	▼0.04	8.75	5.00	5.56	1.88	5.00
86	Steady	Tanzania	Hybrid regime	5.13	▼0.07	4.42	5.00	5.00	6.88	4.71
83	▲4	Madagascar	Hybrid regime	5.06	▼0.27	6.58	3.93	6.11	5.63	4.41
89	▲3	Kenya	Hybrid regime	5.05	Steady	3.50	5.36	6.67	5.63	4.12
87	▲1	Hong Kong	Hybrid regime	5.03	▼0.06	2.75	4.00	3.89	6.88	7.94
91	▲2	Morocco	Hybrid regime	4.97	Steady	5.25	4.29	5.56	5.63	4.12
90	▲5	Honduras	Hybrid regime	4.87	▼0.11	8.75	3.93	4.44	2.50	5.29
92	▼1	Ukraine	Hybrid regime	4.79	▼0.11	5.17	2.71	7.22	5.00	4.41
93	▼11	Tunisia	Hybrid regime	4.65	▼0.06	3.42	3.93	5.56	5.63	5.00
97	▲3	Guatemala	Hybrid regime	4.65	▲0.10	6.08	3.93	5.00	1.88	5.88
95	▲1	El Salvador	Hybrid regime	4.57	▼0.04	6.17	3.21	5.56	3.13	5.00
99	▲1	The Gambia	Hybrid regime	4.47	Steady	4.42	4.29	3.89	5.63	4.12
102	▲1	Sierra Leone	Hybrid regime	4.44	▲0.12	4.83	2.86	3.89	5.00	5.00
94	▼5	Georgia	Hybrid regime	4.36	▼0.34	5.67	3.21	5.56	3.75	5.59
98	▲1	Uganda	Hybrid regime	4.31	▼0.18	3.42	3.57	3.89	6.88	4.71
100	▼25	Bangladesh	Hybrid regime	4.27	▼0.17	6.08	2.57	5.00	5.00	3.53
101	▼3	Benin	Hybrid regime	4.26	▼0.18	1.75	5.36	4.44	6.25	4.41
104	▼1	Turkey	Hybrid regime	4.26	Steady	3.50	4.64	6.11	5.00	2.06
105	Steady	Ivory Coast	Hybrid regime	4.24	▲0.02	4.33	2.86	4.44	5.63	3.82
106	▼2	Nigeria	Hybrid regime	4.10	▼0.06	5.17	3.57	3.89	3.75	4.41
96	▲2	Nepal	Hybrid regime	4.01	▼0.59	4.83	5.36	5.00	2.50	5.29
Authoritarian regimes
107	Steady	Angola	Authoritarian regime	3.94	▼0.11	4.50	2.86	5.56	5.00	2.35
108	Steady	Mauritania	Authoritarian regime	3.84	▼0.12	3.50	3.21	5.56	3.13	4.41
109	▲3	Lebanon	Authoritarian regime	3.81	▲0.25	3.08	0.79	6.67	3.13	4.12
110	Steady	Algeria	Authoritarian regime	3.55	Steady	3.08	2.50	3.33	5.00	3.82
143	▲3	Gabon	Authoritarian regime	3.49	▲1.31	0.83	1.14	2.22	3.75	2.94
112	▲3	Palestine	Authoritarian regime	3.44	Steady	1.58	0.00	8.33	3.75	3.53
113	Steady	Mozambique	Authoritarian regime	3.38	Steady	1.67	1.43	5.56	5.00	3.24
114	▲3	Rwanda	Authoritarian regime	3.34	Steady	1.42	4.29	3.33	5.00	2.65
115	▲7	Jordan	Authoritarian regime	3.28	Steady	3.08	2.86	4.44	2.50	3.53
111	▼2	Kyrgyzstan	Authoritarian regime	3.27	▼0.25	3.42	1.86	3.89	3.13	5.29
119	▲6	United Arab Emirates	Authoritarian regime	3.18	▲0.11	0.00	4.29	2.78	5.63	2.65
117	▼6	Qatar	Authoritarian regime	3.17	Steady	0.00	3.93	2.78	5.63	3.53
116	Steady	Ethiopia	Authoritarian regime	3.13	▼0.11	0.42	2.86	6.11	5.63	1.18
127	▲2	Iraq	Authoritarian regime	3.13	▲0.33	4.83	0.00	6.11	1.88	1.18
120	▼1	Oman	Authoritarian regime	3.05	Steady	0.08	3.57	2.78	5.00	3.82
122	Steady	Zimbabwe	Authoritarian regime	2.98	Steady	0.00	2.50	4.44	5.00	2.94
118	▲2	Kazakhstan	Authoritarian regime	2.91	▼0.17	0.50	3.21	5.00	3.75	2.94
121	▲5	Togo	Authoritarian regime	2.88	▼0.11	0.92	2.14	3.33	5.63	2.94
124	▼2	Comoros	Authoritarian regime	2.81	▼0.03	0.83	2.21	3.89	3.75	3.53
131	▼2	Haiti	Authoritarian regime	2.81	▲0.07	0.00	0.29	2.78	5.63	5.00
126	▲4	Azerbaijan	Authoritarian regime	2.80	Steady	0.50	2.50	3.33	5.00	2.65
128	▲3	Republic of the Congo	Authoritarian regime	2.79	Steady	0.00	2.50	4.44	3.75	3.24
129	▼1	Egypt	Authoritarian regime	2.79	Steady	0.42	2.86	3.89	5.00	1.76
130	▼16	Kuwait	Authoritarian regime	2.78	Steady	0.92	3.21	2.78	3.75	3.24
123	▼2	Cambodia	Authoritarian regime	2.70	▼0.24	0.00	2.36	5.00	5.00	2.35
132	▲2	Djibouti	Authoritarian regime	2.70	Steady	0.00	1.64	3.89	5.63	2.35
133	▲3	Vietnam	Authoritarian regime	2.62	Steady	0.00	3.93	2.78	3.75	2.65
134	▼2	Eswatini	Authoritarian regime	2.60	Steady	0.00	1.64	2.78	5.63	2.94
135	Steady	Cuba	Authoritarian regime	2.58	Steady	0.00	2.86	3.33	3.75	2.94
136	▲2	Cameroon	Authoritarian regime	2.56	Steady	0.33	2.14	3.89	4.38	2.06
137	▼4	Burkina Faso	Authoritarian regime	2.55	Steady	0.00	2.14	3.33	3.75	3.53
138	▲1	Bahrain	Authoritarian regime	2.45	Steady	0.42	2.36	3.33	4.38	1.76
125	▼6	Pakistan	Authoritarian regime	2.44	▼0.40	0.83	4.29	2.78	2.50	3.82
139	▼2	Mali	Authoritarian regime	2.40	Steady	0.00	0.00	5.00	4.38	2.65
140	▲17	Libya	Authoritarian regime	2.31	Steady	1.25	0.00	3.89	3.75	2.65
145	▲3	China	Authoritarian regime	2.24	▲0.13	0.00	3.21	3.33	3.13	0.88
149	▼4	Guinea	Authoritarian regime	2.15	▲0.11	0.00	0.43	3.33	4.38	2.06
144	▲3	Burundi	Authoritarian regime	2.13	Steady	0.00	0.00	3.89	5.00	1.76
142	Steady	Venezuela	Authoritarian regime	2.13	▼0.12	0.00	1.07	5.00	3.13	2.06
146	▲2	Uzbekistan	Authoritarian regime	2.10	Steady	0.00	1.86	2.78	5.00	0.88
147	Steady	Saudi Arabia	Authoritarian regime	2.08	Steady	0.00	3.57	2.22	3.13	1.47
151	▼6	Russia	Authoritarian regime	2.03	Steady	0.00	2.14	2.22	3.75	2.06
152	▼1	Belarus	Authoritarian regime	1.99	Steady	0.00	0.79	3.33	4.38	1.47
153	▼1	Eritrea	Authoritarian regime	1.97	Steady	0.00	2.14	0.56	6.88	0.29
148	▼4	Nicaragua	Authoritarian regime	1.97	▼0.12	0.00	2.14	2.78	3.75	1.76
154	▼1	Iran	Authoritarian regime	1.96	Steady	0.00	2.50	3.33	2.50	1.47
141	Steady	Niger	Authoritarian regime	1.95	▼0.31	0.33	1.14	1.67	3.75	4.41
155	▼1	Yemen	Authoritarian regime	1.95	Steady	0.00	0.00	3.89	5.00	0.88
159	▼4	Tajikistan	Authoritarian regime	1.94	▲0.11	0.00	2.21	1.67	4.38	0.88
156	▲4	Democratic Republic of the Congo	Authoritarian regime	1.92	Steady	2.08	0.43	2.78	3.13	1.18
157	Steady	Equatorial Guinea	Authoritarian regime	1.92	Steady	0.00	0.43	3.33	4.38	1.47
158	▲3	Chad	Authoritarian regime	1.76	▼0.13	0.00	0.00	3.33	3.75	2.35
160	▼1	Laos	Authoritarian regime	1.71	Steady	0.00	2.86	1.67	3.75	0.29
161	▲1	Turkmenistan	Authoritarian regime	1.66	Steady	0.00	0.79	2.22	5.00	0.29
163	▼4	Sudan	Authoritarian regime	1.46	Steady	0.00	0.00	1.11	5.63	0.59
150	▼10	Guinea-Bissau	Authoritarian regime	1.37	▼0.66	2.17	0.00	2.78	3.13	2.06
162	▲	Syria	Authoritarian regime	1.37	▲0.05	0.00	0.00	2.22	4.38	0.00
164	Steady	Central African Republic	Authoritarian regime	1.18	Steady	0.00	0.00	1.67	1.88	2.35
165	Steady	North Korea	Authoritarian regime	1.08	Steady	0.00	2.50	1.67	1.25	0.00
166	Steady	Myanmar	Authoritarian regime	0.96	Steady	0.00	0.00	1.67	3.13	0.00
167	Steady	Afghanistan	Authoritarian regime	0.25	Steady	0.00	0.00	0.00	1.25	0.00

== Countries not listed ==
The Democracy Index does not cover some UN member states, namely Andorra, Antigua and Barbuda, the Bahamas, Barbados, Belize, Brunei, Dominica, the Federated States of Micronesia, Grenada, Kiribati, Liechtenstein, the Maldives, the Marshall Islands, Monaco, Nauru, Palau, Saint Kitts and Nevis, Saint Lucia, Saint Vincent and the Grenadines, Samoa, San Marino, São Tomé and Príncipe, Seychelles, Solomon Islands, Somalia, South Sudan, Tonga, Tuvalu, and Vanuatu.

== Recent changes ==
In 2016, the United States was downgraded from a full democracy to a flawed democracy; its score, which had been declining for some years, crossed the threshold from 8.05 in 2015 to 7.98 in 2016. The report stated that this was caused by myriad factors dating back to at least the late 1960s which have eroded Americans' trust in governmental institutions. Nigeria was also upgraded from an authoritarian regime to a hybrid regime.

The 2017 Democracy Index registered, at the time, the worst year for global democracy since 2010–11. Asia was the region with the largest decline since 2016. Venezuela was downgraded from a hybrid regime to an authoritarian regime. In China, Xi Jinping, General Secretary of the Chinese Communist Party (CCP), further entrenched his power by writing his contribution to the CCP's ideology, dubbed Xi Jinping Thought, into the party's constitution. Moldova was downgraded from a flawed democracy to a hybrid regime as a result of problematic elections. By contrast, Armenia was re-upgraded from an authoritarian regime to a hybrid regime as a result of constitutional changes that shifted power from the presidency to parliament. The Gambia was upgraded again from an authoritarian regime to a hybrid regime after Yahya Jammeh, who was president from 1996 to 2017, was defeated by Adama Barrow, an opposition candidate in the 2016 presidential elections.

In 2019, France, Portugal and Chile were upgraded from flawed democracies to full democracies. This was not a new experience for the former two, which suffered from the eurozone crisis many years before. By contrast, Malta was downgraded from a full democracy to a flawed democracy. Thailand and Albania were upgraded from hybrid regimes to flawed democracies. Algeria was upgraded again from an authoritarian regime to a hybrid regime.

In 2020, Taiwan was upgraded from flawed democracy to full democracy following judicial reforms, and soared to 11th (8.94) position from its previous position at 33rd (7.73), surpassing Switzerland, which ranked 12th. Japan and South Korea were also upgraded again to full democracies, while France and Portugal were once again relegated to flawed democracies. Hong Kong was downgraded from a flawed democracy to a hybrid regime. Algeria was downgraded again from a hybrid regime to an authoritarian regime. The Economist Intelligence Unit noted that democracy "was dealt a major blow in 2020". Almost 70% of countries covered by the Democracy Index recorded a decline in their overall score, as most of them imposed lockdowns and other restrictions in response to the COVID-19 pandemic, in addition to some arresting journalists and citizens accused of spreading COVID-19 misinformation. The global average score fell to its lowest level since the index began in 2006.

In 2021, both the global and regional average scores continued downward trends, with the exception of the Central and Eastern Europe region. Spain and Chile were downgraded from full democracies to flawed democracies, while Ecuador, Mexico, Paraguay, and Tunisia were downgraded from flawed democracies to hybrid regimes. Haiti, Lebanon, and Kyrgyzstan were downgraded from hybrid regimes to authoritarian regimes. In addition, Moldova, Montenegro, and North Macedonia were upgraded from hybrid regimes to flawed democracies, whereas Mauritania was upgraded from authoritarian to hybrid regime. For the first time, North Korea was displaced as the lowest-ranked state in the Democracy Index, with Myanmar and Afghanistan recording scores lower than North Korea due to a military coup and the 2021 Taliban offensive and subsequent takeover of government respectively.

In 2022, the global average score stagnated, as lifting of COVID-related restrictions was largely canceled out by other negative developments globally.

In 2023, the global average score deteriorated further, with most declines occurring in authoritarian and hybrid regimes, with the former becoming more entrenched and the latter struggling to democratize. The threshold for each color has also been changed from greater than the integer to greater than or equal to.

In 2024, the global average once again trended downwards, largely due to continued and expanded crackdowns in dissent in authoritarian regimes. The average score for democracies remained the same, despite 2024 being a major election year. One of the most notable declines was South Korea's downgrade from a full democracy to a flawed democracy, mainly as a result of the political crisis caused by President Yoon Suk Yeol's declaration of martial law in December. Romania's score fell by 0.46 points to 5.99 after controversially cancelling a presidential election, making it the first EU member state to be classified as a hybrid regime. The Czech Republic's score rose from 7.97 to 8.08, which reupgraded it to a full democracy.

In 2025, Moldova was downgraded to a hybrid regime while Angola fell into the ranks of the authoritarian. Romania, Paraguay, Malawi and Senegal rejoined the ranks of flawed democracies while France was upgraded to a full democracy. The United States of America lost 0.2 overall to remain a flawed democracy, while most other democracies held their ground or (like France) improved slightly. Other countries like Canada, Ireland, Finland, and Denmark also saw their score rise up too while remaining full democracies after many years of a falling score.

== World population ==
https://www.worldometers.info/world-population/population-by-country/

Country	Population (2026)	Democracy Index score (2025)
World	8,252,276,212	5.19
All 90 Countries (5.00-10.00)	4,143,539,207	7.17
All 77 Countries (0.00-4.99)	4,108,737,005	2.83
Democracy Regimes (6.00-10.00) [74 Countries]	3,722,255,140	7.55
Hybrid Regimes (4.00-5.99) [32 Countries]	1,203,458,554	4.94
Authoritarian Regimes (0.00-3.99) [61 Countries]	3,326,562,518	2.41
All 10 Countries (9.00-10.00)	89,209,027	9.38
All 16 Countries (8.00-8.99)	510,368,845	8.45
All 19 Countries (7.00-7.99)	659,208,067	7.54
All 29 Countries (6.00-6.99)	2,463,469,201	6.44
All 16 Countries (5.00-5.99)	421,284,067	5.43
All 16 Countries (4.00-4.99)	782,174,487	4.45
All 15 Countries (3.00-3.99)	385,791,350	3.40
All 27 Countries (2.00-2.99)	2,374,805,279	2.44
All 17 Countries (1.00-1.99)	465,734,001	1.71
All 2 Countries (0.00-0.99)	100,231,888	0.61
Rest of the World (No Data)	48,402,184	No Data
Oceania (4 Countries)	44,399,705	7.44
Europe (41 Countries)	830,577,304	7.36
South America (13 Countries)	441,675,362	6.26
North America (13 Countries)	613,315,775	5.57
Asia (46 Countries)	4,772,294,499	4.04
Africa (50 Countries)	1,550,013,567	3.91
Afghanistan	45,047,069	0.25
Australia	27,227,096	8.85
Bangladesh	177,818,044	4.27
Bhutan	802,214	5.65
Cambodia	18,051,219	2.70
China	1,412,914,089	2.24
Fiji	937,282	5.39
Hong Kong	7,378,602	5.03
India	1,476,625,576	6.96
Indonesia	287,886,782	6.37
Japan	122,427,731	8.85
Laos	7,974,017	1.71
Malaysia	36,385,115	7.11
Mongolia	3,556,798	6.50
Myanmar	55,184,819	0.96
Nepal	29,629,410	4.01
New Zealand	5,287,479	9.62
North Korea	26,633,691	1.08
Pakistan	259,299,791	2.44
Papua New Guinea	10,947,848	5.90
Philippines	117,724,471	6.31
Singapore	5,905,748	6.18
South Korea	51,600,388	7.75
Sri Lanka	23,348,315	6.57
Taiwan	23,011,292	8.78
Thailand	71,559,614	6.59
Timor-Leste	1,436,923	6.97
Vietnam	102,177,431	2.62
Asia & Australasia	4,408,778,854	5.27
Albania	2,751,025	6.20
Armenia	2,930,915	5.35
Azerbaijan	10,454,855	2.80
Belarus	8,937,018	1.99
Bosnia and Herzegovina	3,114,242	5.23
Bulgaria	6,667,659	6.34
Croatia	3,822,345	6.50
Czech Republic	10,527,781	8.15
Estonia	1,331,062	8.07
Georgia	3,804,642	4.36
Hungary	9,585,818	6.58
Kazakhstan	21,083,626	2.91
Kyrgyzstan	7,400,465	3.27
Latvia	1,835,935	7.73
Lithuania	2,797,338	7.55
Moldova	2,961,253	5.86
Montenegro	626,233	6.73
North Macedonia	1,804,063	6.28
Poland	37,843,188	7.65
Romania	18,800,605	6.11
Russia	143,394,458	2.03
Serbia	6,641,964	6.30
Slovakia	5,451,342	6.94
Slovenia	2,114,573	7.82
Tajikistan	10,978,599	1.94
Turkmenistan	7,736,632	1.54
Ukraine	39,535,849	4.79
Uzbekistan	37,724,223	2.10
Eastern Europe and Central Asia	412,657,708	5.33
Argentina	46,003,734	6.89
Bolivia	12,749,291	5.38
Brazil	213,562,666	6.76
Chile	19,945,850	7.97
Colombia	53,936,226	6.04
Costa Rica	5,174,789	8.29
Cuba	10,892,659	2.58
Dominican Republic	11,609,500	6.75
Ecuador	18,444,506	5.20
El Salvador	6,391,253	4.57
Guatemala	18,967,978	4.65
Guyana	840,890	6.09
Haiti	12,037,506	2.81
Honduras	11,184,760	4.87
Jamaica	2,833,403	6.74
Mexico	132,997,658	5.40
Nicaragua	7,097,329	1.97
Panama	4,625,718	7.04
Paraguay	7,095,279	6.04
Peru	34,922,148	5.88
Suriname	645,256	7.03
Trinidad and Tobago	1,513,268	7.09
Uruguay	3,382,537	8.92
Venezuela	28,633,711	2.13
Latin America and the Caribbean	665,487,915	5.71
Algeria	48,028,334	3.55
Bahrain	1,675,572	2.45
Egypt	120,101,175	2.79
Iran	93,168,497	1.96
Iraq	48,007,437	3.13
Israel	9,647,689	7.80
Jordan	11,589,532	3.28
Kuwait	5,102,773	2.78
Lebanon	5,897,467	3.81
Libya	7,539,851	2.31
Morocco	38,762,441	4.97
Oman	5,671,458	3.05
Palestine	5,692,790	3.44
Qatar	3,173,559	3.17
Saudi Arabia	35,165,787	2.08
Sudan	53,282,719	1.46
Syria	26,472,497	1.37
Tunisia	12,415,138	4.65
United Arab Emirates	11,574,682	3.18
Yemen	42,961,653	1.95
Middle East and North Africa	585,931,051	3.16
Angola	40,215,179	3.94
Benin	15,170,419	4.26
Botswana	2,603,388	7.63
Burkina Faso	24,601,700	2.55
Burundi	14,729,157	2.13
Cape Verde	529,630	7.58
Cameroon	30,640,817	2.56
Central African Republic	5,698,984	1.18
Chad	21,560,380	1.76
Comoros	899,010	2.81
Republic of the Congo	6,637,785	2.79
Ivory Coast	33,494,346	4.24
Democratic Republic of the Congo	116,452,162	1.92
Djibouti	1,199,459	2.70
Equatorial Guinea	1,984,468	1.92
Eritrea	3,682,669	1.97
Eswatini	1,269,859	2.60
Ethiopia	138,902,185	3.13
Gabon	2,647,399	3.49
Gambia	2,884,079	4.47
Ghana	35,697,557	6.24
Guinea	15,441,993	2.15
Guinea-Bissau	2,297,808	1.37
Kenya	58,636,412	5.05
Lesotho	2,389,336	6.23
Liberia	5,853,949	5.57
Madagascar	33,522,052	5.06
Malawi	22,785,535	6.10
Mali	25,932,275	2.40
Mauritania	5,461,319	3.84
Mauritius	1,265,059	8.23
Mozambique	36,639,851	3.38
Namibia	3,153,246	6.48
Niger	28,814,878	1.95
Nigeria	242,431,832	4.10
Rwanda	14,889,693	3.34
Senegal	19,366,548	6.05
Sierra Leone	8,996,745	4.44
South Africa	65,453,084	7.16
Tanzania	72,563,780	5.13
Togo	9,930,918	2.88
Uganda	52,761,469	4.31
Zambia	22,521,915	5.82
Zimbabwe	17,273,580	2.98
Sub-Saharan Africa	1,269,883,909	4.00
Canada	40,467,728	9.08
United States	349,035,494	7.65
North America	389,503,222	8.37
Austria	9,107,266	8.42
Belgium	11,774,642	7.77
Cyprus	1,382,334	7.45
Denmark	6,023,520	9.42
Finland	5,621,739	9.37
France	66,746,401	8.05
Germany	83,644,258	8.73
Greece	9,897,115	8.07
Iceland	402,329	9.38
Ireland	5,356,950	9.33
Italy	58,926,166	7.58
Luxembourg	687,448	9.08
Malta	549,011	7.93
Netherlands	18,448,775	8.93
Norway	5,652,989	9.81
Portugal	10,395,362	8.28
Spain	47,850,793	8.20
Sweden	10,701,047	9.35
Switzerland	9,007,798	9.32
Turkey	87,926,082	4.26
United Kingdom	69,931,528	8.34
Western Europe	520,033,553	8.43

== See also ==
- Corruption Perceptions Index
- Democracy-Dictatorship Index
- Democracy promotion
- Democracy Ranking
- Democratic backsliding by country
- Gallagher index
