= 2024 in Malawi =

- Decades: 2000s; 2010s; 2020s
- See also: Other events of 2024; History of Malawi

This article lists events from the year 2024 in Malawi.

== Incumbents ==
- President: Lazarus Chakwera
- Vice-President: Saulos Chilima (until 10 June); Michael Usi (since 21 June)

== Events ==
=== January ===
- Six older people are reportedly killed on allegations of witchcraft.

=== February ===
- Investigative journalist Gregory Gondwe goes into hiding after threats from the Malawian Defence Force following his report on military corruption.

=== March ===
- 5 March – The International Blantyre Cancer Centre is officially opened by President Lazarus Chakwera in Blantyre, Southern Region.

=== May ===
- 16 May – A man in Mponela is convicted of insulting President Chakwera after posting an animated TikTok video of him dancing.

=== June ===
- 10 June – 2024 Chikangawa Dornier 228 crash: A Malawian Defence Force aircraft carrying Vice-President Saulos Chilima, former First Lady Patricia Shanil Muluzi and seven other people crashes in the Chikangawa Forest Reserve, killing everyone on board.
- 13 June – PayChangu is granted a payment service provider license by the Reserve Bank of Malawi, allowing it to operate as a regulated digital payment platform.
- 21 June – United Transformation Movement deputy leader Michael Usi is sworn in to replace Saulos Chilima as Vice President.
  - The Constitutional Court rejects a legal challenge to decriminalize same-sex conduct under Penal Code sections 153, 154, and 156.
  - Malawi enacts the Older Persons Law to safeguard older people’s rights and welfare.

=== July ===
- 5 July – Finance minister Simplex Chithyola Banda allegedly distributes K52.5 million to 105 delegates in Lilongwe ahead of the Malawi Congress Party convention.
- 26 July –Malawi at the 2024 Summer Olympics. No medals are won.
- 28 July – The World Food Programme announces a 50% reduction in food rations at Dzaleka Refugee Camp due to funding shortages, affecting over 50,000 residents.

=== August ===
- 1 August – The Ku Mingoli Bash is held at Civo Stadium, Lilongwe, headlined by Cassper Nyovest, Young Stunna, and Tay Grin.
- 19 August – The African Development Bank announces a $11.2 million grant to Malawi in dealing with drought-related damages caused by El Niño.
- 20 August –
  - A Cessna 210 aircraft of FlyNyasa flying from Nkhotakota to Liwonde crashes into Lake Malawi, leaving two people on board missing and a third passenger rescued.
  - Malawi declares mpox a public health emergency, following growing concerns and a reported probable case of mpox in the country.

=== October ===
- 25 October - President Lazarus Chakwera established a Commission of Inquiry into the 10 June 2024 aircraft accident that killed Saulos Chilima and eight others.
- 28 October – Multiple Democratic Progressive Party members are attacked near Lilongwe. An MP is assaulted and his vehicle damaged, and the Malawi Congress Party denies any involvement.

== Holidays ==
- 1 January – New Year's Day
- 15 January – John Chilembwe Day
- 3 March – Martyrs' Day
- 29 March – Good Friday
- 1 April – Easter Monday
- 10 April – Eid al-Fitr
- 1 May – Labour Day
- 14 May – President Kamuzu Banda's Birthday
- 6 July – Independence Day
- 15 October – Mother's Day
- 25 December – Christmas Day
- 26 December – Boxing Day
