= Lilly Alfonso =

Malawian fashion designer

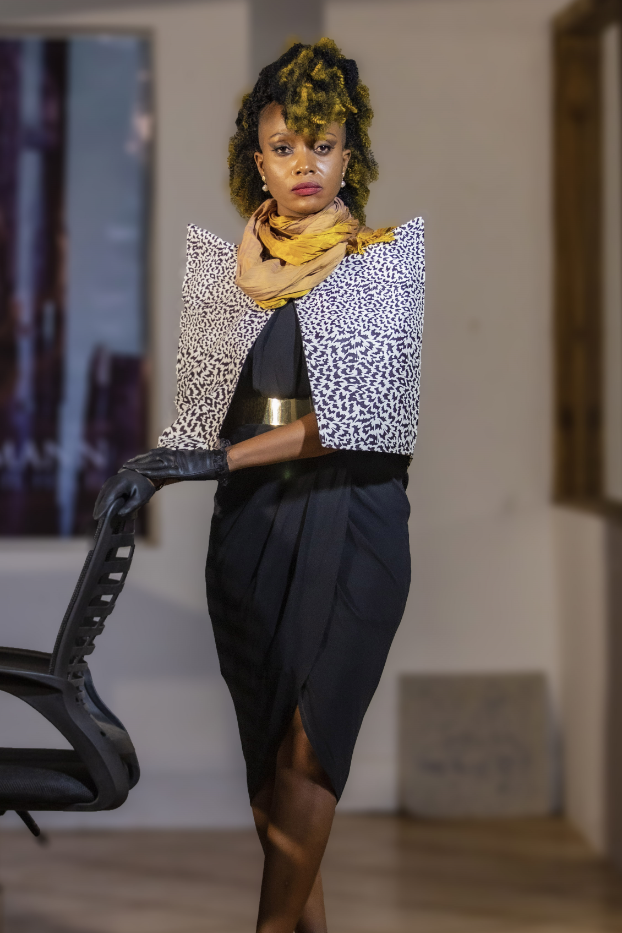
- Lilly Alfonso international multi-award-winning fashion designer from Malawi
- Born: Blantyre, Malawi, Africa
- Years active: 2010
- Organization: Lilly Alfonso
- Title: Fashion Designer
- Awards: Fashion Edition Malawi (FAME) 2010 Best Fashion Design, International Fashion Awards (IFA) 2019 & 2020 International Designer, PAWES WOMEN 2022 Women in Fashion & Beauty
- Honours: UMP Living Legend
- Website: www.lillyalfonso.com

Lilly Alfonso is a Malawian fashion designer. Fashion was one of her interests as a child, leading her to eventually become the CEO and founder of a fashion and design label named after herself. Her designs have been modelled in fashion shows in places such as London and Kuala Lumpur. Her label produces ready-to-wear clothing for both women and men under sub-labels LAwomann and LAmann.

She won the Fashion Malawi Edition (FAME) Fashion Designer of the Year award in 2010. For two consecutive years (2019-2020) she was awarded the International Fashion Designer Award in Cairo, Egypt for her contributions to the industry. She also received a Fashion Living Legend Award at the 2020 UMP awards in Blantyre, Malawi. She has been interviewed by CNN, VOA and the BBC.

She has established the "100-Year Plan", aimed at educating and encouraging young people. She also offers free fashion and design lessons.
