= Fashion Malawi Edition =

Fashion Malawi Edition (Fame) was an organization in Malawi that worked to market and develop the local fashion industry.

It was founded in 2010 by Zilanie Gondwe and Inge Knapen to build a fashion in industry in Malawi after identifying voids in a previously underdeveloped industry. In 2010, the first Malawi Fashion Show was held with Lily Alfonso winning. The event was repeated in 2012 and in 2013, with sponsorship from Kia. Fame organized a fashion show as a part of the Africa Movie Academy Awards nomination gala that took place in Malawi in March 2013.

== See also ==
- List of fashion events
- Fashion week
