= 2014 in Malawi =

- Decades: 1990s; 2000s; 2010s; 2020s
- See also: Other events of 2014; History of Malawi

The following lists events that happened during 2014 in Malawi.

== Incumbents ==
- President: Joyce Banda (until 31 May), Peter Mutharika (starting 31 May)
- Vice-President: Khumbo Kachali (until 31 May), Saulos Chilima (starting 31 May)

== Events ==
=== January ===
- Weekend Times ceases operations

=== May ===
- 20 May - Voters in Malawi go to the polls for a general election.
- 24 May - The President of Malawi Joyce Banda annuls the general elections in which she was a candidate because of claimed electoral irregularities.
