= 2011 in Malawi =

- Decades: 1990s; 2000s; 2010s; 2020s
- See also: Other events of 2011; History of Malawi

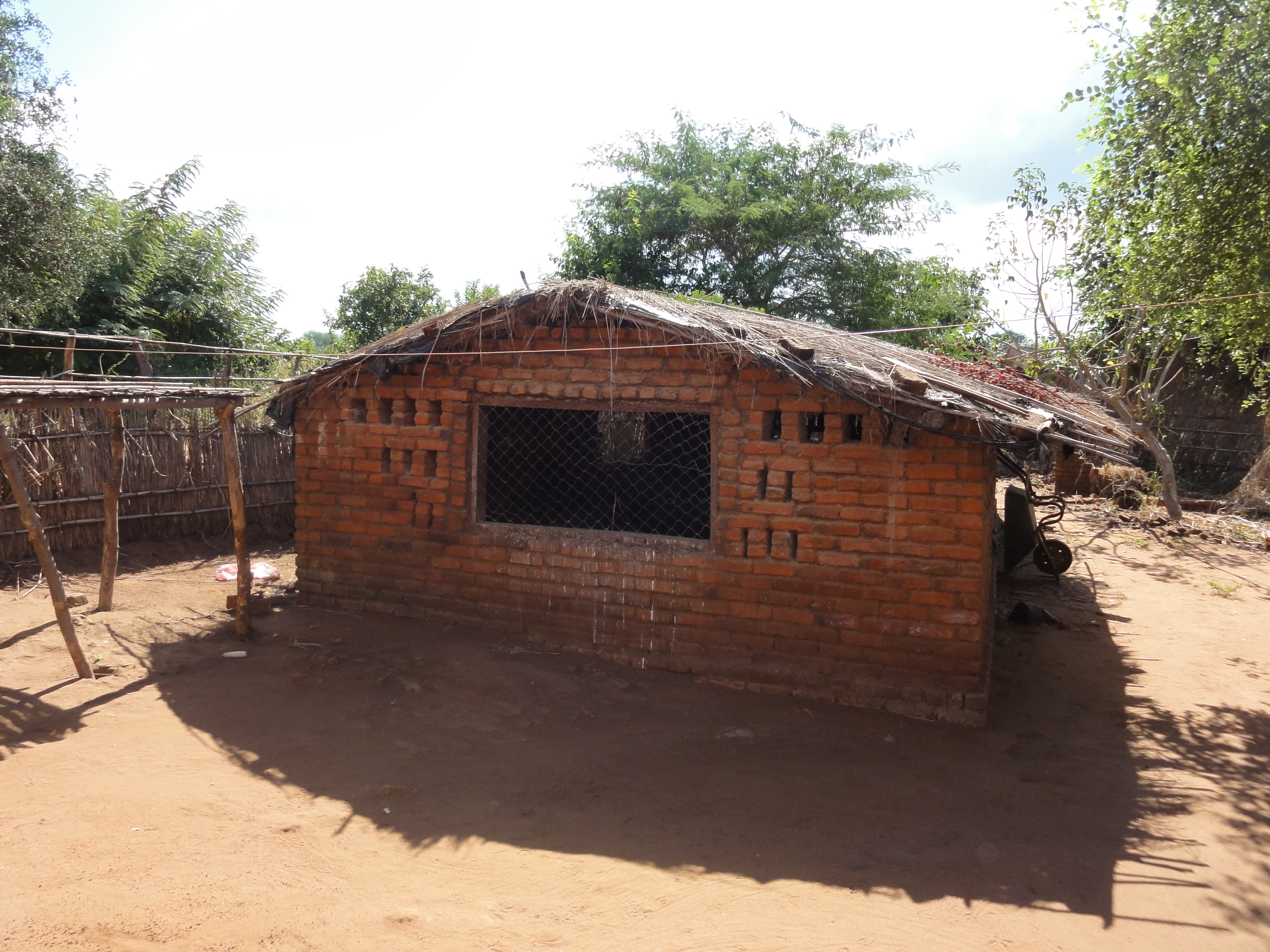
Salima, Malawi

The following lists events that happened during 2011 in Malawi.

== Incumbents ==
- President: Bingu wa Mutharika
- Vice-President: Joyce Banda

== Events ==
=== July ===
- 20 July - Riots erupt in the country against the president Bingu wa Mutharika.
- 21 July - At least 18 people are killed in the protests as the army is called in to crush them in the capital of Lilongwe.
- 22 July - Authorities block a mass funeral for seven of the people who died in the protests.
