= 2020 in Malawi =

- Decades: 2000s; 2010s; 2020s
- See also: Other events of 2020; History of Malawi

This article lists events from the year 2020 in Malawi.

== Incumbents ==
- President: Peter Mutharika (until 28 June), Lazarus Chakwera (from 28 June)
- Vice-President: Everton Chimulirenji (until 3 February) Saulos Chilima (from 3 February)

== Events ==
- 8 May – The Supreme Court of Malawi rejects a bid from President Peter Mutharika and upholds a lower court ruling that annulled last year's elections, paving the way for a new election that will be held on 2 July.
- 28 May – A manhunt is launched after hundreds of people, some with COVID-19, escape from quarantine centers in Malawi, with authorities worried that they will spread COVID-19 in countries whose health systems can be rapidly overwhelmed.

== Deaths ==
- 14 December – Tarcisius Gervazio Ziyaye, 71, Roman Catholic prelate, Archbishop of Lilongwe (since 2001).
