= 2015 in Malawi =

- Decades: 1990s; 2000s; 2010s; 2020s
- See also: Other events of 2015; History of Malawi

The following lists events that happened during 2015 in the Republic of Malawi.

== Incumbents ==
- President: Peter Mutharika
- Vice-President: Saulos Chilima

== Events ==
- 14 January - Heavy rains cause 48 deaths. About 70,000 lose their homes.
- 16 January - Flash floods cause at least 176 deaths. Over 110,000 people are driven from their homes.
