= 2023 in Malawi =

- Decades: 2000s; 2010s; 2020s
- See also: Other events of 2023; History of Malawi

This article lists events from the year 2023 in Malawi.

== Incumbents ==
- President: Lazarus Chakwera
- Vice-President: Saulos Chilima

== Events ==
Ongoing – COVID-19 pandemic in Malawi

- 2 January – Malawi have suspended schools opening in Lilongwe and Blantyre following a cholera outbreak, which has killed 595 people so far. Nineteen people died on New Year's Eve alone.
- 11 April – Malawian President Lazarus Chakwera pardons 200 prisoners, including a former minister convicted of corruption, his office says.
- 13 April – The parliament of Malawi approves a new defence act, expanding the armed forces with the creation of a fourth service.
- 13 July – Religious leaders in Lilongwe march against same sex-marriage ahead of a constitutional court hearing brought by Jana Gonani.

== See also ==
- COVID-19 pandemic in Africa
