= Bridgin Foundation controversy =

Controversy over the Bridgin Foundation's alleged US$6.8 billion grant to Malawi

The Bridgin Foundation controversy refers to public and media scrutiny of a November 2022 agreement between the Lazarus Chakwera led Government of Malawi and the Belgium registered Bridgin Foundation, in which Bridgin presented a purported US$6.8 billion grant package for major infrastructure and development projects. The signing, held at Kamuzu Palace and witnessed by senior officials prompted immediate questions about the foundation’s provenance, the scale of the pledge relative to Malawi’s economy, and whether adequate due diligence had been carried out.

== Background ==
On 28 November 2022, the Malawi presidency hosted a ceremony in Lilongwe at which government representatives and Bridgin officials signed documents describing a US$6.8 billion package to fund projects including a 1,000 mega watt power plant, a teaching hospital, a fertilizer plant, university infrastructure and government office towers. The signing was reported in local and regional media and Bridgin described itself as a Belgian foundation.

== Reactions and criticism ==
Independent journalists, analysts and some public officials quickly expressed scepticism. Investigations and reports noted that the package was extraordinarily large relative to Malawi’s national budget and GDP, that Bridgin’s funding sources and governance were opaque, and that officials had not publicly shown standard vetting documents. Media outlets described the organisation as “shadowy” and asked whether the deal could be legitimate; commentators called for transparency and accountability. Former central-bank and other economic figures publicly warned against accepting unusually large, unexplained offers without verification.

== Kenya links and further developments ==
After the deal in Malawi, the Bridgin Foundation also appeared in Kenya under similar circumstances. In March 2023, representatives of the foundation, including President Prof. Tanko Mouhamadou and Programme Director Christophe Prieels, met with Kenyan President William Ruto to discuss possible infrastructure projects. The meeting was confirmed by Kenya’s embassy in Brussels, but Kenyan media and commentators raised questions about the origin of the funds, the lack of transparency surrounding the foundation, and the absence of verifiable completed projects.

In Malawi, further scrutiny followed. Finance Minister Sosten Gwengwe stated during national budget consultations that no binding agreement for US$6.8 billion with Bridgin had ever been signed, dismissing the claims as “nonsense”. Around the same period, Bridgin’s president acknowledged that the organisation did not hold the claimed funds, saying it depended on undisclosed donors but providing no evidence of past projects. Investigative reporting later revealed that the foundation had failed to file mandatory financial accounts with authorities in Belgium, adding to doubts about its operations and credibility.

== Aftermath ==
In the years following the signing the Bridgin package did not materialise as announced; the Chakwera government and university partners issued few verifiable progress reports and critics continued to question the arrangement. By 2024 – 2025 local reporting described stalled or unfulfilled elements of the programme and renewed calls for accountability and clarity about any costs or commitments incurred by the state. No widely reported independent confirmation has been published showing that Bridgin delivered funds at the scale announced.
