= 2022 in Malawi =

- Decades: 2000s; 2010s; 2020s
- See also: Other events of 2022; History of Malawi

This article lists events from the year 2022 in Malawi.

== Incumbents ==
- President: Lazarus Chakwera
- Vice-President: Saulos Chilima

== Events ==
Ongoing – COVID-19 pandemic in Malawi

=== March ===
- 24 March – The World Health Organization announces that a polio vaccination campaign will begin in Malawi, Mozambique, Tanzania, and Zambia.

=== April ===
- 29 April – A high court in Malawi convicts five people of killing an albino man and seven more people of selling the man's body parts. The body parts are desired by some local residents, who believe that they can bring luck and wealth.

=== November ===
- 28 November – The Malawi government purportedly signed a US$6.8 billion grant agreement with the Belgium-registered Bridgin Foundation, promising infrastructure and development projects, sparking immediate controversy over its legitimacy.

== Deaths ==
- 29 July – Emmie Chanika, human rights activist (born 1956)

== See also ==
- COVID-19 pandemic in Africa
