= Zilanie Gondwe =

Malawian journalist and activist

- Born: Zilanie Tamara Gondwe; October 1974 (age 51); Zomba, Malawi
- Occupations: Journalist, entrepreneur

Zilanie Tamara Gondwe (born October 1974) is a Malawian journalist, activist, and entrepreneur. She is most known as the founder and CEO of Blackmore Creative Agency, a public relations and event management agency. Through the company, she has spearheaded many popular national events such as Women of Distinction Awards (WODA), CREAM - Woman in the Arts!, Tedx Lilongwe and Fashion Malawi Edition (FAME)'s fashion shows, which initiated Malawi's first fashion week.

A philanthropist, Gondwe is also known for her charitable work impacting artists and women in Malawi. She has also served in the environmental sector the Chairperson of The Lilongwe Society for Protection and Care of Animals (LSPCA).

== Career ==
Gondwe started her education in law school in London with an interest in entertainment law but after opening her own lodge, decided to study tourism and hospitality. She earned a diploma in tourism and hospitality in London and interned in the entertainment industry in Europe. She eventually got a job in the entertainment industry in Malawi where she has been influential in the arts and creative sector in Malawi. Gondwe worked as a journalist for the Guardian News, a Malawian-based newspaper, in her early career, and later became its editor. However, she left journalism to pursue a career fulltime in the entertainment, and arts sector through the establishment of Blackmore Creative Agency.

She held office as the chair of the Arterial Network, an organization advancing the arts and culture in the country.

=== Event and entertainment management ===
Gondwe has worked to support and initiate creative projects and artists in Malawi through her company, Blackmore Creative Agency. Notably, she has initiated high-profile projects like FAME fashion Week and has worked in entertainment and tourism as head of media/public relations for events such as the Lake of Stars Festival, where she announced a partnership with the UK government and the British High Commissioner, Fiona Ritchie.

She has managed Malawian artists such as Wambali Mkandawire and has worked with other musicians such as Tay Grin, Tiwonge, and Wendy Harawa.

=== Social activism ===
Gondwe is a feminist and woman's rights activist. She was the producer of Malawi's first production of The Vagina Monologues in 2015 which developed into a cultural adapted version called Chitenje Changa Monologues. She has also initiated the African Women Monologues, a stage performance focused on women's issues which was performed in Uganda. Her play The Hyenas Must be Arrested was also performed, which was political and focused on harmful cultural practices affecting women.

=== Environmental activism ===
Gondwe is the co-founder and Director of the Institute of the Conservation of Nature. She previously worked as the Chairperson of UN Women funded domestic animal welfare start-up, LSPCA, Lilongwe Society for Prevention Against Cruelty to Animals.

== Personal ==
Gondwe was born in Zomba to Political Science and Economics professor, Dr Chifipa Gondwe and school teacher, Mazoe Gondwe. Gondwe has lived in Kenya and Zambia, Malawi and the U.K. In Malawi, she attended St. Andrew's in Malawi in Blantyre. She has a daughter and was married to musician Sally Nyundo who she was separated with in 2016. She is the grand niece to Rose Chibambo.

== Awards ==
Women Entrepreneurs Reporting Award, One World Media - 2022
