= Precious Gondwe =

Botswana lawyer and businesswoman

Counsel Precious Gondwe
- Born: Precious Masuku; Bulawayo, Zimbabwe
- Education: LL.B. University of South Africa
- Occupations: Lawyer, Businesswoman
- Years active: 2012-present
- Website: https://preciousandpartners.com/

Counsel Precious Gondwe is a Botswana based lawyer and businesswoman. She was named in the Top 30 Most Influential Female Lawyers in Africa wherein she represented the Republic of Botswana as a lawyer and a Law firm founder in Africa.

== Background ==
Born in 1987 in Bulawayo, Zimbabwe, Precious Gondwe was raised in Botswana where she had her early education. She proceeded to study law at University of South Africa in Pretoria in 2015.

== Career ==
Precious Gondwe started her career in 2012 as student and legal intern attache' at Lerumo Mogobe Legal Practitioners. In 2018 she established her own firm Precious & Partners in Botswana. Over the years she has gained recognition as one of the prominent legal practitioners in Southern Africa.

She moved to the UK and worked in the UK's Legal 500's and later returned to Botswana to establish her law firm in 2018.

In 2021 she became an arbitrator with the Association of Arbitrators in South Africa. In March 2023, she was appointed speaker and moderator during Forbes Africa Summit which was hosted in Botswana. In the same year, she was selected to represent Botswana as a delegate at the Commonwealth Study Conference by the Duke of Edinburgh in Canada as hosted by HRH Princess Anne of the United Kingdom, an initiative for the mentorship of Commonwealth Youth Leaders of which she remains Alumni. She is a fellow with the World Bank Group under the Women, Business & Law initiative where she contributes to legal research and policy analysis. She has also contributed for the last two consecutive years as Research Fellow in the Business Ready Report (B Ready 2023-2024 & 2024/2025).

In 2018, she founded the Pan African Game Changers (PAGC), an initiative focused on mobilizing, mentoring, and uplifting young African women and me to become leaders and pioneers of change in their communities. Through PAGC, she has been at the forefront of several projects in education, poverty alleviation programs and related economic empowerment programs and has reached and mentored over 10,000 youth across twelve African countries and the world over.

== Awards ==
In 2020 she was recognized in the top five Southern African Women in Leadership (SAWIL) where she was awarded and named in the Top 10 Category of Trailblazers, Southern African Women in Leadership. She was then awarded a Humanitarian Award by the Young Boss Media New York the same year. In 2021, from The Vessels Awards, Precious was given the Pan African Leader and social Entrepreneur of year awards. In 2021 Precious Gondwe sat on the board of Pembury Lifestyle Group.
