= Malawi Energy Regulatory Authority =

Energy sector regulatory authority of Malawi

Malawi Energy Regulatory Authority (MERA) is a government regulatory organisation in Malawi responsible for overseeing and regulating the energy sector in the country. It was established by the Energy Regulation Act No. 20 of 2004 and operates under multiple energy laws to ensure fair, transparent, efficient, and cost-effective regulation of energy markets, for the benefit of both consumers and energy operators.

== Legal Mandate ==
MERA is established under the Energy Regulation Act of Malawi (Chapter 73:02), which outlines its formation, powers, and duties. The Act mandates the Authority to regulate the energy industry independently and sets out its functions concerning licensing, tariffs, compliance, and consumer protection.
