= Of Chameleons and Gods =

1981 collection of poetry by Jack Mapanje

- First image
- Author: Jack Mapanje
- Language: English
- Series: African Writers Series
- Genre: Poetry collection
- Publisher: Heinemann
- Publication date: 1981
- Publication place: United Kingdom
- Media type: Print (paperback)
- ISBN: 0-435-90236-9

Of Chameleons and Gods is the title of the first collection of poetry by Malawian poet Jack Mapanje, published in 1981 in the United Kingdom, in Heinemann's African Writers Series. Despite critical acclaim, the collection was withdrawn from circulation in Malawi, because it was seen as a critique of the current government and especially the leader Hastings Kamuzu Banda.

Mapanje, in his introduction to the work, describes as the result of the work of "ten turbulent years". The 'chameleon' of the title refers to the disguise of personal voice he deemed necessary in order to mount a criticism of the politics at the time.

Of Chameleons and Gods is divided into four sections: "Of Chameleons and Gods", '"Sketches from London", "Re-entering Chingwe's Hole" and "Assembling Another Voice". The sections are almost chronological: poems in "Sketches from London"were written between 1972 and 1975; those in "Re-entering Chingwe's Hole", on Mapanje's return from London between 1975 and 1978; and those in "Assembling Another Voice" were probably the last to be written'.

== Literary criticism ==
The literary features of the collection have been overshadowed by its censorship. The poet makes use of the verse form to provide a satirical perspective on the political leaders and their supporters. However, his criticism is by no means limited to the political scenario: poems such as "Kabulo Curio-Shop" demonstrate a critique of the exploitation of art and the artist in tourism.

The collection made use of repeated imagery in its satire of the government. Images included references to "dawn" or "cockerel", alluding to the Malawi Congress Party's flag, which bears a picture of the sunrise and H. Kamuzu Banda's use of "Kwatcha!" ("Dawn!") at the start of addresses. These images were used not only in Mapanje's poetry but also other poetry of protest from the situation.

Much of the poetry also demonstrates the influence of oral forms of poetry, especially in range and density of images and the address of the voice to an implied audience, which follows from Mapanje's endorsement of the sophistication of the oral mode of literature against the presumption, prevalent in the early 1970s, of its primitiveness.

== Censorship ==
After its initial launch in London, Mapanje was told of rumours of a poor reception by the Malawian Censorship Board, including the purchasing of multiple copies of the text only to dispose of the books in public latrines. It was suggested to Mapanje that a Malawian edition of the collection could be published with "at least eighty percent" of the poems included. This suggestion went no further.

After a poor reception of the 1984 reprint of the collection by officials in Malawi, the Ministry of Education and Culture banned the book from schools and universities in June 1985, claiming it was "unsuitable". Mapanje believes that those on the Censorship Board felt positive towards the work, but that it was the introduction to the work and the inclusion of the poem "Making our Clowns Martyrs" that led to the decision. Officially the work was not "banned", but "withdrawn from circulation".

Mapanje was imprisoned without charge. In response to his imprisonment, Amnesty International made him a Prisoner of Conscience; protests included a reading of selections from Of Chameleons and Gods outside the Malawian High Commission in London by Harold Pinter.

In response to the book's censorship, Mapanje wrote the poem 'On Banning Of Chameleons and Gods (June, 1985)', first published in his later collection The Chattering Wagtails of Mikuyu Prison.
