= 2025 in Malawi =

- Decades: 2000s; 2010s; 2020s
- See also: Other events of 2025; History of Malawi

This article lists events from the year 2025 in Malawi.

== Incumbents ==
- President: Lazarus Chakwera (until 4 October); Peter Mutharika (since 4 October)
- Vice-President: Michael Usi (until 4 October); Jane Ansah (since 4 October)

== Events ==
=== March ===
- 13 March – Malawi announces the withdrawal of its military contingent from the Southern African Development Community peacekeeping mission to the eastern Democratic Republic of the Congo.

=== May ===
- 2 May – Welcome to Maula Prison movie was released and screened at the Bingu International Convention Centre in Lilongwe.
- 2–4 May – The Zomba City Festival and Art in the Park are held in Zomba.
- 16 May – The World Bank approves a US$350 million grant for the Mpatamanga Hydropower Storage Project, aimed at doubling Malawi’s hydropower capacity.
- 23–25 May – The Pakhonde Ethno-Music Festival takes place at Nkhata Bay.

=== June ===
- 26 June – Peaceful protests take place in Lilongwe, Blantyre, Mangochi and Mzuzu by the group "Citizens for Credible Elections" demanding the resignation of senior MEC officials. Human rights defender Sylvester Namiwa is attacked during the protest in Lilongwe.

=== July ===
- 11 July – Mount Mulanje is designated as a World Heritage Site by UNESCO.

=== August ===
- 28 August – The Ministry of Health warns that Malawi may run out of tuberculosis (TB) drugs by the end of September due to supply shortages.

=== September ===
- 16 September – 2025 Malawian general election: Incumbent president Lazarus Chakwera loses reelection to his predecessor, Peter Mutharika, who wins more than 56% of the vote.

=== October ===
- 3–5 October – The Khulubvi Arts and Cultural Festival is held in Nsanje District.
- 4 October – Peter Mutharika is sworn in as Malawi’s seventh president at Kamuzu Stadium in Blantyre.
- 5 October – President Mutharika appoints a partial cabinet and several senior government officials, including the Second Vice President and the Defence Chief.
- 24 October – The Ministry of Education, through the Malawi Institute of Education, launches a new National Curriculum Framework replacing the Outcome-Based Curriculum with a Competency-Based Curriculum focused on practical skills, creativity, and critical thinking. The reform introduces a 1–6–6–3 structure and supports the Malawi 2063 vision.
- 29 October – The National Assembly elects Sameer Suleman as Speaker, Victor Musowa as First Deputy Speaker and Esther Jolobala as Second Deputy Speaker in a leadership vote of the new parliamentary term.

=== November ===
- 6 November – The Minister of Transport and Public Works, Feston Kaupa, officially opens the K37 billion five-lane Lilongwe Bridge for public use, improving traffic flow on a key section of the M1 road in the capital.

=== December ===
- 3 December – Former Secretary to the President and Cabinet Colleen Zamba is arrested at Kamuzu International Airport, Lilongwe, as she attempts to leave the country; she is taken to Lingadzi Police Station for questioning.
- 13 December
  - Thandie Chisi is crowned Miss Malawi at a pageant held in Lilongwe.
  - The Maso Awards, recognising achievements in music, arts and film, are held in Lilongwe, with Patience Namadingo and Joe Ikon among the major winners.
- 16 December – US President Donald Trump issues a proclamation imposing partial travel restrictions on Malawian nationals travelling to the United States.
- 19 December – The Film Association of Malawi (FAMA) holds its annual film awards in Lilongwe, with the movie Welcome to Maula Prison winning multiple honours and several of its actors and crew among the major winners.
- 20 December – Mighty Wanderers clinch the 2025 TNM Super League title with a 6–0 victory over Moyale Barracks at Kamuzu Stadium in Blantyre, ending an eight-year league title drought.
- 30 December
  - The High Court in Lilongwe delivers a long-awaited verdict in the Tichitenji Farm case in Mchinji, ruling in favour of the Kaphwiti family and against former official hostess Cecilia Kadzamira after nearly two decades of legal proceedings.
  - Heavy rains damage several major roads and bridges in central Malawi, including M1 in Kasungu and M5 in Nkhotakota districts, cutting off road travel to the Northern Region.

== Holidays ==
- 1 January – New Year's Day
- 15 January – John Chilembwe Day
- 3 March – Martyrs' Day
- 30 March – Eid al-Fitr
- 18 April – Good Friday
- 21 April – Easter Monday
- 1 May – Labour Day
- 14 May – President Kamuzu Banda's Birthday
- 6 July – Independence Day
- 15 October – Mother's Day
- 25 December – Christmas Day
- 26 December – Boxing Day

== Deaths ==
- 2 December – Essau Kanyenda, 43, footballer (Jomo Cosmos, Polokwane City, national team).
