= 2021 in Malawi =

- Decades: 2000s; 2010s; 2020s
- See also: Other events of 2021; History of Malawi

This article lists events from the year 2021 in Malawi.

== Incumbents ==
- President: Lazarus Chakwera (from 2020)
- Vice-President: Saulos Chilima (from 2020)

== Events ==
Ongoing – COVID-19 pandemic in Malawi

=== January ===
- 12 January – President Chakwera declares a state of disaster amid a spike in coronavirus infections after two cabinet ministers die from COVID-19.
- 18 January – COVID-19 pandemic: The country goes under lockdown for the first time since the pandemic began. Malawi has recorded 12,470 coronavirus cases and 314 deaths, but there has been a 40% increase in infections in January.

=== November ===
- 17 November – Police fired tear gas to quell an anti-government protest against deteriorating economic conditions and rising cost of living in Malawi. Hundreds of people poured onto the streets of the southern commercial hub of Blantyre, calling on President Lazarus Chakwera’s administration to take immediate steps to rein in soaring prices and unemployment. The protesters set tires on fire and blocked roads to bring traffic to a halt in parts of the city, and also torched a police post in Blantyre’s central business district. “They have failed to fulfill their promises of easing the suffering of Malawians. The cost of living is too high as prices of essentials, including food and fuel, are soaring.”

== Deaths ==
- 12 January
  - Lingson Belekanyama, politician, Local Government Minister; COVID-19.
  - Sidik Mia, 56, politician, MP (2004–2014), Minister of Defence (2009–2010), Minister of Transport and Public Works (since 2020); COVID-19.
- 31 January – Wambali Mkandawire, jazz musician; COVID-19.

== See also ==
- 2021 in East Africa
- COVID-19 pandemic in Africa
