= Gregory Gondwe =

Malawian journalist, editor and media consultant

Vitus-Gregory Gondwe
- Born: 1974 (age 51–52); Mulanje, Malawi
- Occupation: journalist
- Years active: 1993–present
- Notable credit(s): BizCommunity, BiztechAfrica, CNN, AP
- Title: Correspondent, columnist
- Website: https://www.investigativeplatform-mw.org/

Vitus-Gregory Gondwe is a Malawian investigative journalist, editor and media consultant. He is a correspondent for the Associated Press, as well as a regular correspondent for BizCommunity and BiztechAfrica. He has contributed since 1993. He writes about freedom of press and the media industry.

== Career ==
Until February 2016 he was the chief reporter as well as the bureau chief for Times Media Group.

He studied at the University of Malawi for a BA in journalism. He has a diploma and an intermediate certificate in journalism. He started journalism in 1993. He was a reporter for The Chronicle newspaper in Malawi until 2005. He worked as Regional Editor and Northern Region Bureau Chief for Zodiak Broadcasting Station from 2007 to 2010.

== Mutharika administration journalism attacks ==
Gondwe became of interest during the journalistic crackdown during 2011-2012 when President Bingu wa Mutharika was in his final term. Minister of Information Patricia Kaliati allegedly threatened him over the phone. Kaliati attacked his cabinet minister assessment published by The Daily Times. She allegedly warned him not to write about her again in a negative light or face unspecified consequences.

The Media Institute of Southern Africa (MISA) released a supportive statement asking the Minister to address them with any reporting discrepancies. The World Media body and others also wrote to Bingu wa Mutharika about the alleged threat.

== Gondwe, Zuneth Sattar and Malawi Government ==
In October 2021 Zuneth Sattar, a Malawian-born, UK-based businessman was arrested by the UK government on allegations of corrupt business deals in Malawi14. The case involved three contracts with the Malawi government in which companies with connections to Sattar were involved in contracts worth tens of millions of dollars. In early April 2022, the Malawi Police arrested Gregory Gondwe in Blantyre and confiscated his ICT equipment following an article he published in Platform for Investigative Journalism on 30 March 2022. In the publication Gondwe revealed that government continued dealing with Sattar by paying K1.3 billion for a contract belonging to businessman despite the contract still being under a restriction order by the Anti-Corruption Bureau (ACB) for possible corruption. During the arrest, his computer and phone were taken by the police. The officers allegedly forced Gondwe to reveal the source of the confidential legal documents he posted online.

=== Allegations in the UK case ===
- That Sattar overpriced water cannons supplied to the Malawi Police Service
- Shady procurement of armoured personnel carriers and food rations

=== Senior government figures named in the Sattar corruption case ===
- Vice President Saulos Chilima
- State House Chief of Staff Prince Kampongamgaga
- Inspector General of Police George Kainja
- Former Anti-Corruption Bureau (ACB) director Reyneck Matemba
- Lands and Housing Minister Kezzie Msukwa

== Gondwe, Sattar and Malawi Defence Forces ==
Gondwe went into hiding following another expose on 29 January 2024 in which it was revealed that Zuneth Sattar was still dealing with the government of Malawi despite corruption allegations levelled against Zuneth and his associates. Gondwe posted contractual and payment details between the Malawi Defence Forces and companies close to Sattar. Gondwe said that MDF officials wanted to arrest him. He posted on MISA Malawi's WhatsApp page; "I wanted to inform you that I am currently outside the country on a temporary basis. I deeply appreciate your support and the encouraging words you've extended to me during this time," He received support from the Malawi Human Rights Commission. Attorney General Thabo Chakaka Nyirenda and MDF Commander General Paul Valentino Phiri said that the journalist would not be arrested.
