= 2018 in Malawi =

- Decades: 1990s; 2000s; 2010s; 2020s
- See also: Other events of 2018; History of Malawi

This article lists events from the year 2018 in Malawi.

== Incumbents ==
- President: Peter Mutharika
- Vice-President: Saulos Chilima

== Deaths ==
- 15 February – Samuel Mpasu, writer, politician and diplomat (b. 1945)
- 17 February – Emmanuele Kanyama, Roman Catholic bishop (d. 1962)
- 19 February – Necton Mhura, academic, politician and diplomat (b. 1957)
- 6 May – Jack Chamangwana, football player and coach (b. 1957)
- 15 September – David Rubadiri, poet and diplomat (b. 1930)
