= Stimulus package =

Government economic policy

A stimulus package is most often a government program providing economic stimulus.

Examples in the United States include the Economic Stimulus Appropriations Act of 1977; the Economic Stimulus Act of 2008; the American Recovery and Reinvestment Act of 2009; the CARES Act in 2020 and American Rescue Plan Act of 2021.

Examples elsewhere include Thai Khem Khaeng, a 2009 and 2010 program in Thailand; the Kenya Economic Stimulus Programme in 2009; the 2008 Chinese economic stimulus program; the July Jobs Stimulus in Ireland in 2020; the ROC consumer voucher in Taiwan; and the Triple Stimulus Voucher in China.
