= Stimulus bill (disambiguation) =

A stimulus bill is a government program providing economic stimulus.

Stimulus bill may also refer to:

- Chinese economic stimulus program, China
- ROC consumer voucher, Taiwan
- Triple Stimulus Voucher, China
- July Jobs Stimulus, Ireland
- Kenya Economic Stimulus Program, Kenya
- Thai Khem Khaeng, Thailand
- CARES Act, U.S.
- American Recovery and Reinvestment Act of 2009, U.S.
- American Rescue Plan Act of 2021, U.S.
- Economic Stimulus Appropriations Act of 1977, U.S.
- Economic Stimulus Act of 2008, U.S.
