= Stimulus =

A stimulus is something that causes a response. It may refer to:

- Stimulation
  - Stimulus (physiology), something external that influences an activity
  - Stimulus (psychology), a concept in behaviorism and perception
- Stimulus (economics)
  - For government spending as stimulus, see Fiscal policy
  - For an increase in money designed to speed growth, see Monetary policy
- The input to an input/output system, especially in computers

== See also ==
- Stimulus bill (disambiguation), in economics
- Economic Stimulus Act of 2008, United States
- 2008 Chinese economic stimulus plan
- 2008 European Union stimulus plan
- American Recovery and Reinvestment Act of 2009
- Stimulus Package, an add-on for the video game Modern Warfare 2
