= Stimulus (economics) =

Attempts to use monetary or fiscal policy to stimulate the economy

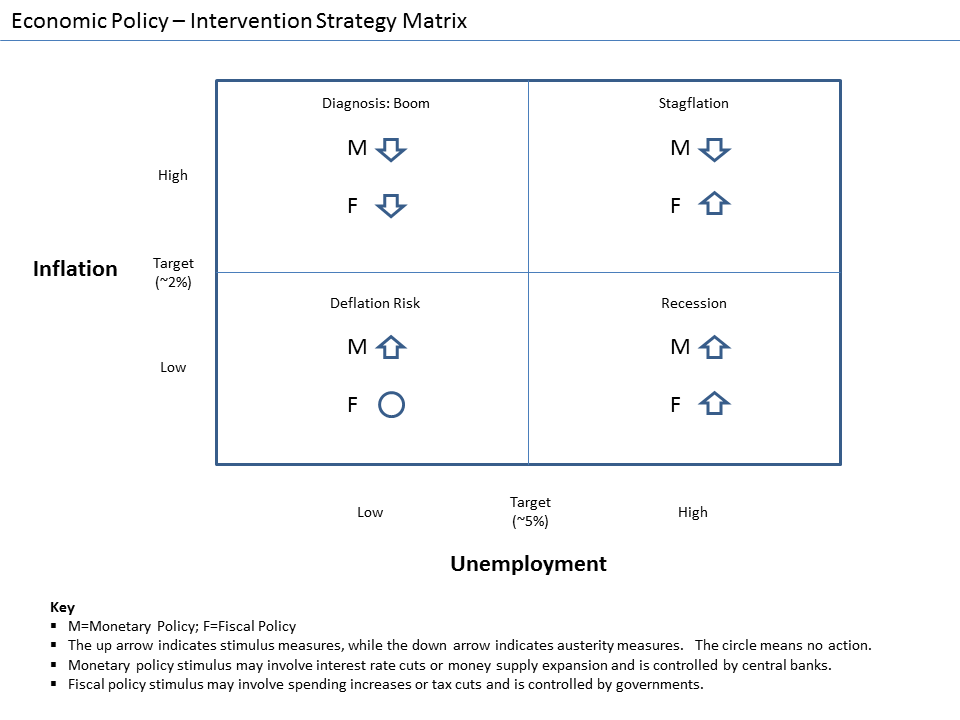
Typical intervention strategies under different conditions

In economics, stimulus refers to attempts to use monetary policy or fiscal policy (or stabilization policy in general) to stimulate the economy. Stimulus can also refer to monetary policies such as lowering interest rates and quantitative easing.

A stimulus is sometimes colloquially referred to as "priming the pump" or "pump priming".

== Concept ==
During a recession, production and employment are far below their sustainable potential due to lack of demand. It is hoped that increasing demand will stimulate growth and that any adverse side effects from stimulus will be mild.

Fiscal stimulus refers to increasing government consumption or transfers or lowering taxes, increasing the rate of growth of public debt. Supporters of Keynesian economics assume the stimulus will cause sufficient economic growth to fill that gap partially or completely via the multiplier effect.

Monetary stimulus refers to lowering interest rates, quantitative easing, or other ways of increasing the amount of money or credit.

== Economist views ==
Milton Friedman argued that the Great Depression was caused by the fact that the Federal Reserve did not counteract the sudden reduction of money stock and velocity. Ben Bernanke argued, instead, that the problem was lack of credit, not lack of money, and hence, during the Great Recession, the Federal Reserve led by Bernanke provided additional credit, not additional liquidity (money), to stimulate the economy back on course. Jeff Hummel has analyzed the different implications of these two conflicting explanations. President of the Federal Reserve Bank of Richmond, Jeffrey M. Lacker, with Renee Haltom, has criticized Bernanke's solution because "it encourages excessive risk-taking and contributes to financial instability." Thomas M. Humphrey and Richard Timberlake concentrated in their book "Gold, the Real Bills Doctrine, and the Fed: Sources of Monetary Disorder 1922–1938" on the real bills doctrine as a causative factor in the Great Depression.

It is often argued that fiscal stimulus typically increases inflation, and hence must be counteracted by a typical central bank. Hence only monetary stimulus could work. Counter-arguments say that if the output gap is high enough, the risk of inflation is low, or that in depressions inflation is too low but central banks are not able to achieve the required inflation rate without fiscal stimulus by the government.

Monetary stimulus is often considered more neutral: decreasing interest rates make additional investments profitable, but yet only the most additional investments, whereas fiscal stimulus where the government decides the investments may lead to populism via public choice theory, or corruption. However, the government can also take externalities into account, such as how new roads or railways benefit users who do not pay for them, and choose investments that are even more beneficial although not profitable.

Supporters of Keynesian economics are typically strongly in favor of stimulus. Austrian economic school and Rational expectations economists are typically against stimulus.

== Notable examples ==
- The Economic Stimulus Appropriations Act of 1977 was a stimulus package enacted by the 95th United States Congress and signed into law by President Jimmy Carter on 13 May 1977.
- The Economic Stimulus Act of 2008, signed on February 13, 2008 by President George W. Bush, was intended to boost the United States economy in 2008.
- The government of Gordon Brown in the United Kingdom was the first government to enact fiscal stimulus in the aftermath of the Great Recession, including £3 billion worth of investment spending brought forward from 2010, a £145 tax cut for basic rate payers, a 2.5% VAT cut, nationalization of banks, a £20 billion loan scheme for small and medium-sized businesses and a subsidized car scrappage scheme.
- The American Recovery and Reinvestment Act of 2009 was a stimulus package enacted by the 111th United States Congress and signed into law by President Barack Obama in February 2009 developed in response to the Great Recession.
- The Thai Khem Khaeng was a Thai economic stimulus investment program imposed by the government of Abhisit Vejjajiva in 2009.
- The Kenya Economic Stimulus Program was a spending plan initiated by the Government of Kenya to boost economic growth and lead the economy of Kenya out of the 2007–2008 Kenyan crisis and the Great Recession
- The Chinese economic stimulus program of 2008-2009 was a RMB¥ 4 trillion stimulus introduced during the 2008 financial crisis.
- The $2 trillion CARES Act in response to the COVID-19 pandemic was signed by President Donald Trump in March 2020.
- The $1.9 trillion American Rescue Plan Act of 2021 was signed into law by Joe Biden on March 11, 2021.
- The July Jobs Stimulus was €7.4 billion stimulus package announced by the Government of Ireland on 23 July 2020 in response to the economic impact of the COVID-19 pandemic in the Republic of Ireland.
- The Government of the Republic of China issued ROC consumer voucher during the Great Recession and Triple Stimulus Vouchers during the COVID-19 recession in Taiwan.

== See also ==
- Gross fixed capital formation § Economic analysis
- NAIRU
- National fiscal policy response to the Great Recession
- Policy mix
