= Great Recession in Asia =

While beginning in the United States, the Great Recession (late 2000s and early 2010s) spread to Asia rapidly and has affected much of the region.

== East Asia ==
=== Mainland China ===
In China, the International Monetary Fund predicts GDP growth for 2008 will be 9.7% and drop to 8.5% in 2009. A struggle was underway to see who would swallow the losses on US Agencies and Treasuries. On November 9, 2008 China announced a package of capital spending plus income and consumption support measures. Four trillion yuan ($586 billion) will be spent on upgrading infrastructure, particularly roads, railways, airports and the power grid; on raising rural incomes via land reform; and on social welfare projects such as affordable housing and environmental protection. So far at least 670,000 small and medium-size enterprises have been closed.

=== Hong Kong ===
The Hong Kong economy officially slid into recession in the final quarter of 2008. The economy is predicted to grow at 2 percent in 2009. Hong Kong is an advanced tertiary economy built on services, retail, tourism, transport and financial industries. Hong Kong's manufacturing industry is located in Guangdong province which employs over 11 million people. The Hang Seng Index has lost over 60 percent of its value, property market lost over 40 percent in value and unemployment is at a record high of 4.8 percent.

=== Taiwan ===
Taiwan announced billions of dollars in spending and tax cuts due to declining growth and a 26 percent slump in the stock market in 2008. The bankruptcy of Lehman Brothers raised concerns about global exposure to the assets and stock of Lehman Brothers and the potential for the bankruptcy to cause further tightening of credit. Taiwan, despite reporting few losses from the subprime mortgage crisis, was said to have Lehman-related exposure for its companies and retail investors totaling $2.5 billion. To increase purchasing power, the ROC government has issued the ROC consumer voucher.

=== Japan ===
In Japan exports in June declined for the first time in about five years falling by 1.7 percent. Exports to the United States and European Union fell 15.4 percent and 11.2 percent respectively. The decline in exports and increase in imports cut Japan's trade surplus $1.28 billion a decline of 90 percent from the previous year. An economist at the Royal Bank of Scotland said the decline means the Japanese economy most likely declined in the second quarter. Taro Aso, secretary-general of Japan's Liberal Democratic Party, said he believes Japan had entered a recession.

Japan's economy declined by 0.6 percent in the second quarter of 2008. This was later revised to a decline of 0.7 percent. Japanese exports grew 0.3 percent in August 2008 compared to a year before down from 8 percent the previous month. Exports to the U.S. fell 21.8 percent, the biggest decline on record, and exports to Europe fell 3.5 percent. Two Japanese banks appeared on the list of major Lehman creditors. On November 17, the Japanese Economy Minister announced that the nation was officially in a recession.

=== South Korea ===
By September 2008, the crisis threatening the GSEs (US mortgage lenders Fannie Mae and Freddie Mac) began to have consequences in Asia. The foreign exchange reserves of South Korea's central bank contained many depreciating "Agency bonds" from the GSEs, threatening a currency crisis and leading to depreciation of the South Korean won against the US dollar and other major currencies. Samsung Electronics has been reported to be posting a decrease in sales for the first time since the 1997 Asian financial crisis that home appliances saw a decrease in the domestic market of up to 20 percent since mid-June compared to the previous year. Domestic auto sales also saw a decrease in the second quarter. Auto exports also posted a loss and exports of home appliances were also reported to be in decline.

== South East Asia ==
=== Malaysia ===
In January 2009, Malaysia has banned the hiring of foreign workers in factories, stores and restaurants to protect its citizens from mass unemployment amid the global economic crisis.

It was announced that some foreign companies would fire workforce in Malaysia. In 2009 GDP contracted 1.7%.

=== Philippines ===
Unlike the other economies in the region, The Philippines was the only one of a few countries to have recorded a positive economic growth in 2009 and not have a recession. However, the country suffered during the 2008 financial crisis as the economy was based on the remittances of the Overseas Filipinos, most of them working in affected countries such as the United States.

== Middle East ==
=== United Arab Emirates ===
Real estate prices in Dubai have decreased substantially.

=== Lebanon ===
Lebanon is one of the only seven countries in the world to have scored profits in 2008. Given the regular security turmoil it has faced in the past, its banks have adopted a conservative approach. The strict regulations imposed by the central bank were crafted to make the Lebanese economy immune to political crisis; and so far, this has applied to the global economic crisis as well. The Lebanese banks remain, under the current circumstances, high on liquidity and reputed for their security.

Moody's has recently shifted Lebanon's sovereign rankings from stable to positive acknowledging its financial security. Moreover, with a Beirut stock market increase of 51%, the index provider MSCI, ranked Lebanon as the world's best performer in 2008.

== South Asia ==
=== Bangladesh ===
Bangladesh economy is not affected by the global recession. Bangladesh's economic growth and exports remain quite strong. Bangladesh's economy wasn't affected by the global recession too much, after the global recession, the garments industry started improving.

=== India ===
During the 2008 financial crisis, the BSE Sensex dropped from over 21,000 points in January 2008 to below 8,000 points in October 2008

India's economy benefited from recent high economic growth which declined greatly due to the global economic crisis. Economic growth in India during FY2008-09 stood at 6.7%. The global crisis had less impact of India because exports account for only 15% of India's GDP, less than half the levels of major Asian economic powers such as China and Japan. However, unlike other major Asian economies, India's government finances were in poor shape and as a consequence, it was not able to enact large-scale economic stimulus packages. Despite this, from June 2008 to June 2009, industrial production in India grew by 7.1%.

The former Indian Finance Minister P. Chidambaram expected India's economy to "bounce back" to 9% during FY2009. India's then Prime Minister Manmohan Singh said that the government will take measures to ensure that the economic growth bounces back to 9%. Nevertheless, India's overall growth of GDP in 2008-09 was 6.7%. The Asian Development Bank predicted India to recover from weakening momentum in 4-6 quarters. At the G20 Summit, India called for coordinated global fiscal stimulus to mitigate the severity of the global credit crunch. India said that it would inject US$4.5 billion into the financial system to help exporters.

Some analysts pointed that India's growing trade with other Asian countries, especially China, will help reduce the negative impact of the crisis. Analysts also said that India's high domestic demand and large infrastructure projects will act as a buffer reducing the impact of the global downturn on its economy. Adam Segal argued that India's financial system is relatively insulated and its banks do not have significant exposure to subprime mortgage. In an editorial, the New York Times praised the strong regulations placed on the Indian banking system by the Reserve Bank of India.

In May 2009, India reported an economic growth rate of 5.8%, beating most forecasts. In second quarter of 2009 the Indian economy grew by 7.9% and gave indications that the Indian economy would scale a growth rate of 7% or above in 2009 and 8-9% in 2010. In the 3rd Quarter of 2010, the economy had bounced back with a growth rate of 8.8%.

=== Pakistan ===
In Pakistan the central bank's foreign currency reserves, when counting forward liabilities is said to only amount to as little as $3 billion, sufficient for a single month of imports. Corruption and mismanagement have combined with high oil prices to damage Pakistan's economy. Pakistan's rupee has lost more than 21 per cent of its value in 2008 and inflation is at 25 per cent. The government has failed to defer payments for Saudi oil or raise favorable loans. President Asif Ali Zardari claimed Pakistan needed a bailout worth $100 billion which he was expected to ask for at a meeting in Abu Dhabi in November. Ratings agency Standard and Poor's rates Pakistan's sovereign debt at CCC +, only a few ratings above the default level, warning the country may be unable to cover about $3 billion in upcoming debt payments.

This led a change in economic managers, and politically elected finance minister Naveed Qamar was replaced by a financial advisor, Shaukat Tareen, a former banker belonging to Citigroup on October 8, 2008. The new finance advisor led the Pakistani delegation to IMF-World Bank meeting in USA with a hope to obtain a loan from the World Bank which has been stopped now due to reservations from IMF on World Bank for releasing this nature of Loan to any country.
