= Small and Medium Enterprise Administration =

Government agency of Taiwan

Coordinates: 25°01′29.9″N 121°31′27.7″E

Small and Medium Enterprise Administration, MOEA
- 經濟部中小企業處
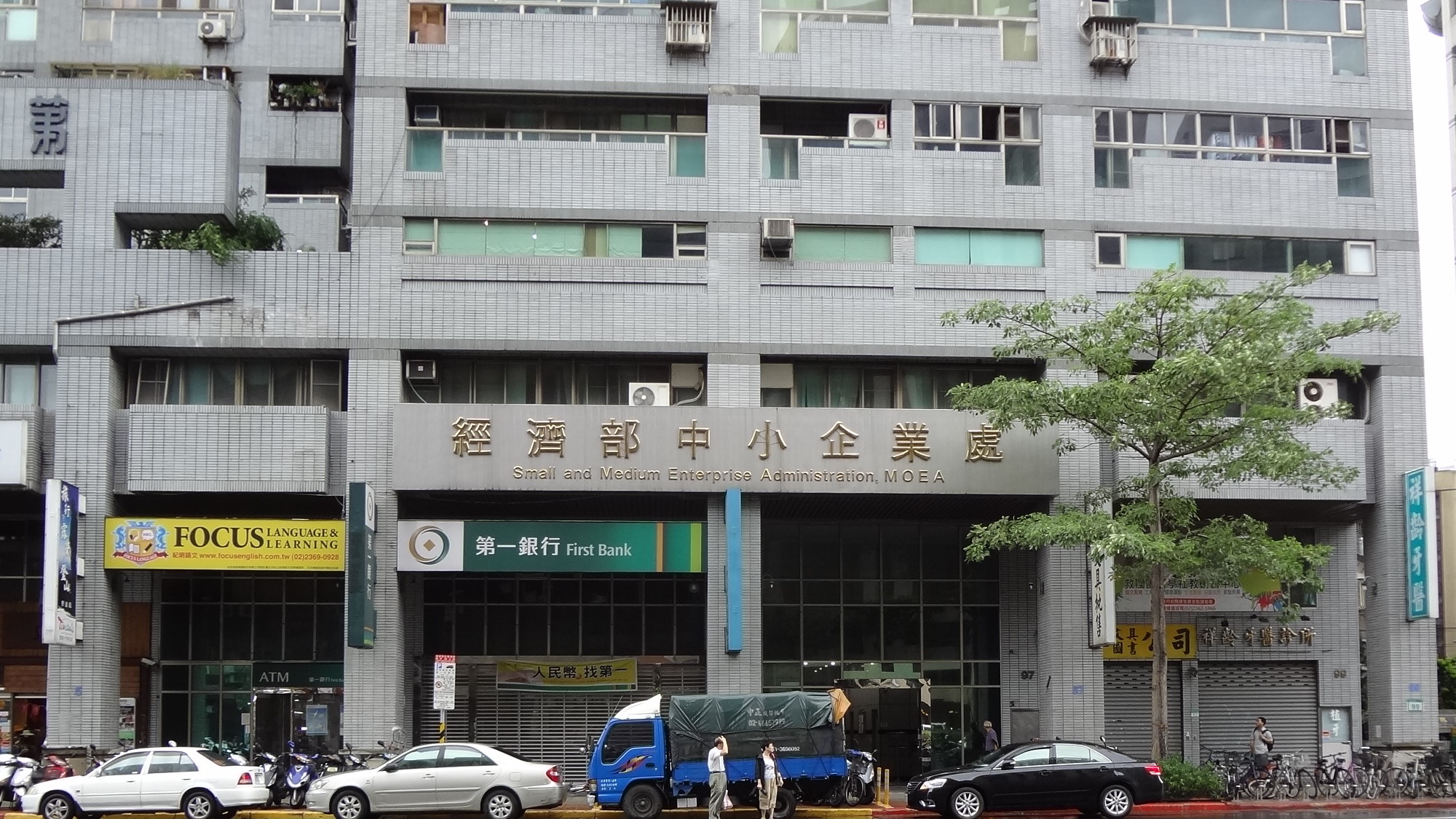

Agency overview
- Formed: January 1981
- Jurisdiction: Taiwan (ROC)
- Headquarters: Da'an, Taipei
- Parent agency: Ministry of Economic Affairs
- Website: Official website

The Small and Medium Enterprise Administration (SMEA; traditional Chinese: 經濟部中小企業處; simplified Chinese: 经济部中小企业处; pinyin: Jīngjì Bù Zhōngxiǎo Qǐyè Chù) is the administrative agency of the Ministry of Economic Affairs of the Taiwan (ROC) responsible for small and medium enterprises -related affairs.

== History ==
The agency was established in January 1981.

== Organizational structure ==
- Policy Planning Division
- Management Consulting Division
- Business Start-up Division
- Incubation Division
- Information Technology Division
- Financing Division
- Secretariat
- Personnel Office
- Accounting Office
- Civil Service Office

== Transportation ==
The agency is accessible within walking distance southeast of Guting Station of Taipei Metro.

== See also ==
- Ministry of Economic Affairs (Taiwan)
- Economy of Taiwan
