= Economy of Kenya =

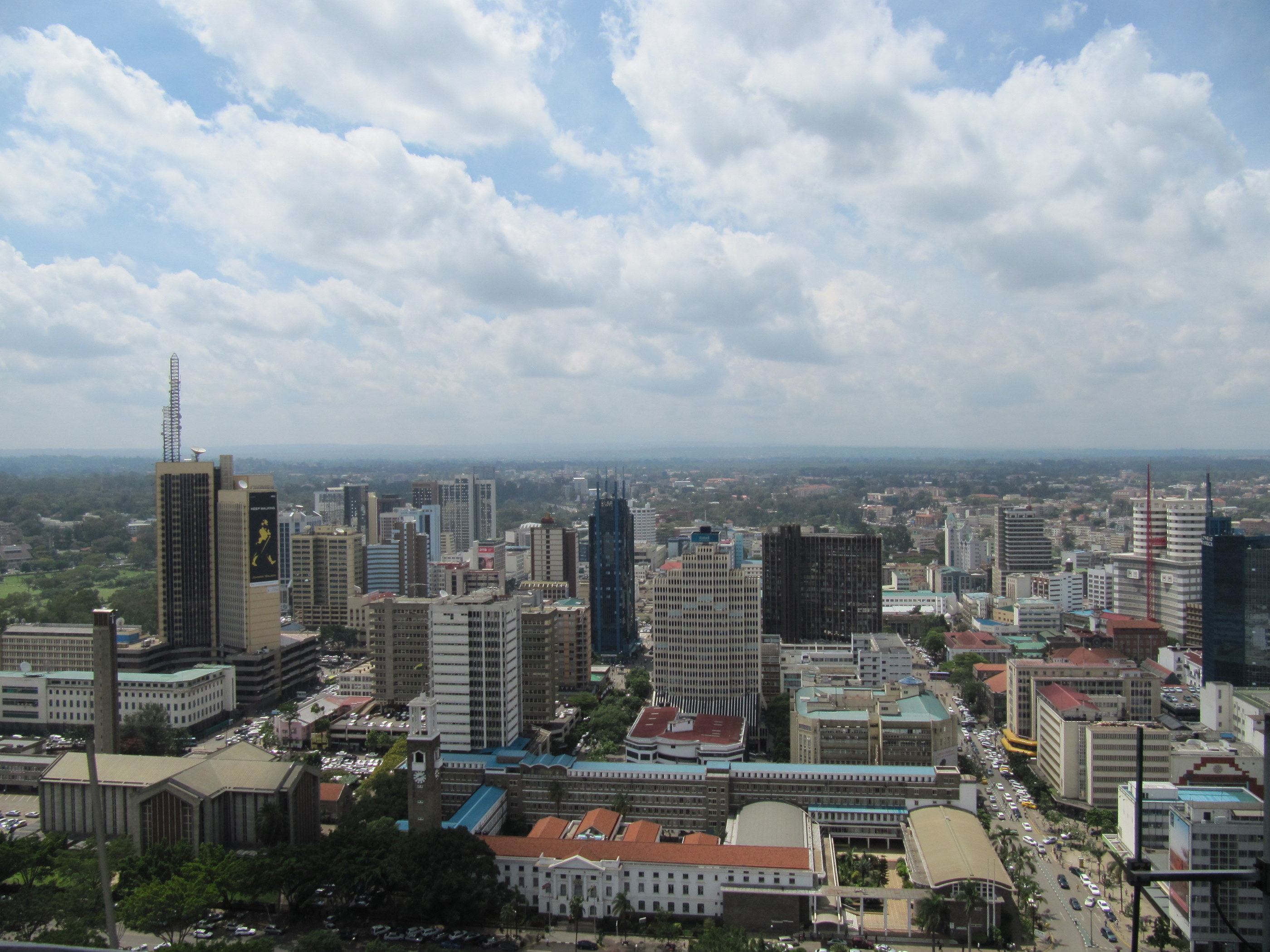
- Nairobi, the financial centre of Kenya
- Currency: Kenyan shilling (KES, KSh)
- Trade organisations: AU, AfCFTA, EAC, COMESA, CEN-SAD, WTO and others
- Country group: Developing/Emerging; Lower-middle income economy

Statistics
- Population: ▲51,526,000 (2023 est.)
- GDP: ▲$151.15 billion (nominal; 2026); ▲$436.13 billion (PPP; 2026)
- GDP rank: 62nd (nominal; 2025); 59th (PPP; 2025)
- GDP growth: 4.8% (2025)
- GDP per capita: ▲$2,790 (nominal; 2026); ▲$8,040 (PPP; 2026)
- GDP per capita rank: 148th (nominal; 2025); 139th (PPP; 2025)
- GDP per capita growth: 2.7% (2024)
- GDP by sector: Agriculture: 29%; Industry: 18%; Services: 53%; (2021est.)
- Inflation (CPI): 4.3% (2026est.) (29 January 2026 est.)
- Population below national poverty line: 14% ( 2022 est.)
- Gini coefficient: 38.7 medium (2021)
- Human Development Index: ▲0.628 medium (2023) (152nd); ▲0.456 low IHDI (2023)
- Corruption Perceptions Index: ▲32 out of 100 points (2024, 121st rank)
- Labour force: ▲21,190,309 (2019); 72.4% employment rate (2016)
- Labour force by occupation: Agriculture: 54%; Industry: 8%; Services: 38%; (2020 est.)
- Unemployment: 2.98% (2020 est.)
- Main industries: Consumer goods (plastic, furniture, batteries, textiles, clothing, soap, cigarettes, flour, confectionery), pharmaceuticals, agricultural products, horticulture, oil refining; aluminium, steel, lead; cement, commercial ship repair, tourism, information technology

External
- Exports: ▲$13.9 billion (2022 est.)
- Export goods: Tea, horticultural products, coffee, petroleum products, fish, cement, apparel
- Main export partners: Uganda 14%; Pakistan 8%; United States 8%; Netherlands 8%; United Kingdom 7%; (2020)
- Imports: ▲$24.4 billion (2022 est.)
- Import goods: Machinery and transportation equipment, oil, petroleum products, motor vehicles, iron and steel, resins and plastics
- Main import partners: China 27%; India 11%; United Arab Emirates 7%; Japan 4%; Saudi Arabia 3%; (2020)
- FDI stock: ▲$8.738 billion (31 December 2017 est.); ▲ Abroad: $1.545 billion (31 December 2017 est.)
- Current account: ▼ −$5.021 billion (2017 est.)
- Gross external debt: ▼$27.59 billion (31 December 2017 est.)

Public finance
- Government debt: ▲54.2% of GDP (2017 est.)
- Foreign reserves: ▲$12.334 billion (29 January 2026 est.)
- Budget balance: −6.7% (of GDP) (2017 est.)
- Revenue: 21.89 billion (2022 est.)
- Spending: 26.93 billion (2022 est.)
- Credit rating: Standard & Poor's: B+ (Domestic); B+ (Foreign); BB− (T&C Assessment); Outlook: Stable; Fitch: B+; Outlook: Stable
- All values, unless otherwise stated, are in US dollars.

Kenya has a developing market-based economy with a few state enterprises. Kenya has an emerging market and is an averagely industrialised nation ahead of its East African peers. Currently a lower middle income nation, Kenya plans to be a newly industrialised nation by 2030. The major industries driving the Kenyan economy include financial services, agriculture, real estate, manufacturing, logistics, tourism, retail and energy. As of 2020, Kenya had the third largest economy in Sub-Saharan Africa, behind Nigeria and South Africa. Regionally, Kenya has had a stronger and more stable economy compared to its neighbouring countries within East Africa. By 2023, the country had become Africa's largest start-up hub by both funds invested and number of projects.

The government of Kenya is generally investment-friendly and has enacted several regulatory reforms to simplify foreign and local investment, including the creation of an export processing zone. An increasingly significant portion of Kenya's foreign financial inflows are remittances by Kenyans in the Diaspora, who work in the United States, the Middle East, Europe and Asia. According to data by the Central Bank of Kenya, remittances from Kenyans living abroad make up over 3.4 percent of the Gross Domestic Product (GDP).

As of September 2018, economic prospects were positive, with above 6% gross domestic product (GDP) growth expected. This growth was attributed largely to expansions in the telecommunications, transport, and construction sectors; a recovery in agriculture; and the rise of small businesses helping to pull the economy. These improvements are supported by a large pool of highly educated professional workers. There is a high level of IT literacy and innovation, especially among young Kenyans.

In 2020, Kenya ranked 56th in the World Bank ease of doing business rating, up from 61st in 2019 (of 190 countries). Compared to its neighbours, Kenya has a well-developed social and physical infrastructure.

== History ==
Between 70 AD and 1500 AD, trade routes — spanning Africa, Asia and Europe — integrated the Kenyan coastal strip into the world economy. Foreign merchants would bring their merchandise to the Kenyan coast and leave with African goods.

In 1499 AD, Vasco da Gama, a Portuguese explorer, returned to Europe after discovering the sea route to India through South Africa. This new route allowed European nations to dominate the trade economy of the East African coast, with the Portuguese entrenching themselves in the 16th and 17th centuries. In the 18th century, the Portuguese were replaced in this East African economic corridor by Omani Arabs. Eventually, the British replaced the Omani Arabs. In 1895 they dominated the coastal strip; by 1920, they had followed the interior trade routes all the way to the Buganda Kingdom. To make this ancient economic trade route more profitable, the British used Indian labourers to build a railway from Mombasa at the coast to Kampala, the capital of Buganda kingdom, following old trade routes. Major towns were founded along the railway line, backed by European settler farming communities. The Indian labourers who did not return to India after railway construction ended were the first to establish shops (dukawallahs) in these towns.

During the colonial period, the European settler farming community and the Indian dukawallahs established the foundations of the modern formal Kenyan economy. Prominent examples of Asian-Kenyan business owners whose businesses started as dukawallahs include Manu Chandaria and Madatally Manji. While Europeans and Indians enjoyed strong economic growth between 1920 and 1963, Africans were deprived of their land, dehumanised, and forced to work for minimal pay under extremely poor working conditions through a well-established system of racial segregation.

Kenya gained its independence in 1963. Under President Jomo Kenyatta, the Kenyan government promoted africanisation of the Kenyan economy, generating rapid economic growth through public investment, encouragement of smallholder agricultural production, and incentives for private, often foreign, industrial investments. An influential sessional paper authored by Tom Mboya and Mwai Kibaki in 1965 stressed the need for Kenya to avoid both the capitalistic economy of the West and the communism of the East. The paper argued that Kenya should instead concentrate on African socialism, while avoiding linking Kenya's economic fortunes to any country or group of countries. From 1963 to 1973, GDP grew at an annual average rate of 6.6%; during the 1970s, it grew at an average rate of 7.2%. Agricultural production grew by 4.7% annually in the same period, stimulated by redistributing estates, distributing new crop strains, and opening new areas to cultivation. However, the rate of GDP growth declined to 4.2% per year in the 1980s, and 2.2% a year in the 1990s.

Kenya's policy of import substitution, which started in 1946 with European and Asian enterprises, did not achieve the desired result of transforming Kenya's industrial base. In the late 1970s, rising oil prices began to make Kenya's manufacturing sector noncompetitive. In response, the government began a massive intervention in the private sector. Lack of export incentives, tight import controls, and foreign exchange controls made the domestic environment for investment even less attractive.

In the 1980s and 1990s, Kenya signed structural adjustment loans with the World Bank and IMF, the loans were to be given on the condition that Kenya adopts government reforms, a liberal trade and interest rate regime, and an outward-oriented industrial policy, among other reforms. The Kenyan economy performed very poorly during this era of World Bank and IMF-driven liberalisation at the height of Daniel Arap Moi administration.

From 1991 to 1993, Kenya had its worst economic performance since independence. Growth in GDP stagnated, and agricultural production shrank at an annual rate of 3.9%. Inflation reached a record of 100% in August 1993, and the government's budget deficit was over 10% of GDP. As a result of these issues, bilateral and multilateral donors suspended their aid programmes in Kenya in 1991.

In 1993, the Kenyan government began a major programme of economic reform and liberalisation. A new minister of finance and a new governor of the central bank undertook a series of economic measures with the assistance of the World Bank and the International Monetary Fund (IMF). The government eliminated price controls and import licensing, removed foreign exchange controls, privatised a number of publicly owned companies, reduced the number of civil servants, and introduced conservative fiscal and monetary policies. From 1994 to 1996, Kenya's real GDP growth rate averaged just over 4% a year.

Kenya's economic performance since independence.

In 1997, however, the economy entered a period of slow growth, due in part to adverse weather conditions and reduced economic activity before the general elections in December 1997. In July 1997, the Government of Kenya refused to meet earlier commitments to the IMF on governance reforms. As a result, the IMF suspended lending for three years, and the World Bank put a $90 million structural adjustment credit on hold.

The Kenyan government subsequently took positive steps on reform, including the establishment of the Kenya Anti-Corruption Authority in 1997. The state also implemented measures to improve the transparency of government procurement and reduce the government payroll. In July 2000, the IMF signed a $150 million Poverty Reduction and Growth Facility, and the World Bank followed shortly after with a $157 million Economic and Public Sector Reform credit. However, both were eventually suspended. Despite setbacks, the process of reform established Kenya as East Africa's economic powerhouse and the region's business hub.

Economic growth improved between 2003 and 2008, under the Mwai Kibaki administration. When Kibaki took power in 2003, he immediately established the National Debt Management Department at the treasury, reformed the Kenya Revenue Authority (KRA) to increase government revenue, reformed financial laws on banking, wrote off the debts of strategic public enterprises, and ensured that 30% of government tax revenue was invested in economic development projects. With these reforms, driven by the National Rainbow Coalition government, the KRA collected more tax revenue in 2004 than was anticipated. The government then initiated investments in infrastructure. By 2005, the Kenyan public debt had reduced from highs of 80% of GDP in 2002 to 27% of GDP in 2005. The financial sector greatly improved, and Equity Bank Kenya became one of the largest banks in East Africa. Economic growth improved from 2% in 2003 to 7% in 2007. In 2008, the growth slumped to 1% due to post-election violence before returning to an average of 5% between 2009 and 2013. However, in 2009, due to drought and the 2008 financial crisis, high input costs as well as a fall in demand for some of the country's exports caused the agriculture sector to contract by 2.7%.

Between 2013 and 2018, under the Jubilee Party government led by Uhuru Kenyatta, the GDP growth averaged above 5%. Growth in small businesses is credited with some of the improvement. Real GDP growth (annualised) was 5.7% in Q1 of 2018, 6.0% in Q2 2018 and 6.2% in Q3 2018. Despite this robust growth, concerns remained about Kenya's debt sustainability, current account deficit, fiscal consolidation and revenue growth.

== Macroeconomic trend ==
=== Main indicators ===
The following table shows the main economic indicators in 1980-2026. Inflation below 5% is in green.

Year	GDP			GDP growth (real)	Inflation	Government debt (% of GDP)
Year	Total (bil. US$ nominal)	Per capita (US$ PPP)	Total (bil. US$ PPP)	GDP growth (real)	Inflation	Government debt (% of GDP)
1980	13.4	1379	21.7	▲5.6	▲13.9	n/a
1985	▼11.6	▲1758	▲32.9	▲4.1	▲13.0	n/a
1990	▲16.2	▲2280	▲50.2	▲4.1	▲17.8	n/a
1995	▼15.9	▲2377	▲60.6	▲4.3	▲1.6	n/a
2000	▲18.2	▲2474	▲73.0	▲0.3	▲10.0	▲43.1
2005	▲26.3	▲2879	▲97.3	▲5.7	▲9.9	▼37.4
2006	▲29.7	▲3060	▲106.2	▲5.9	▲6.0	▼37.1
2007	▲36.7	▲3265	▲116.5	▲6.9	▲4.3	▼34.2
2008	▲41.1	▼3244	▲119.1	▲0.2	▲15.1	▲34.3
2009	▲42.3	▲3283	▲123.8	▲3.3	▲10.5	▲36.0
2010	▲45.4	▲3507	▲135.4	▲8.1	▲4.1	▲36.7
2011	▲46.6	▲3677	▲145.2	▲5.1	▲14.0	▼35.7
2012	▲56.4	▲3829	▲154.7	▲4.6	▲9.4	▲37.6
2013	▲61.7	▲3945	▲163.3	▲3.8	▲5.7	▲39.8
2014	▲68.4	▲4115	▲174.5	▲5.0	▲6.9	▲41.3
2015	▲70.4	▲4269	▲184.9	▲5.0	▲6.6	▲45.8
2016	▲74.8	▲4390	▲194.5	▲4.2	▲6.3	▲50.4
2017	▲82.0	▲4527	▲205.5	▲3.8	▲8.0	▲53.9
2018	▲92.2	▲4774	▲221.5	▲5.7	▲4.7	▲56.4
2019	▲100.3	▲5042	▲240.0	▲5.1	▲5.2	▲59.1
2020	▲100.9	▲5128	▲250.3	▼ -0.3	▲5.3	▲68.0
2021	▲109.9	▲5712	▲284.1	▲7.6	▲6.1	▲68.2
2022	▲114.7	▲6302	▲319.1	▲4.9	▲7.6	▼67.8
2023	▼108.2	▲6788	▲349.9	▲5.7	▲7.7	▲73.4
2024	▲119.3	▲7160	▲375.5	▲4.7	▲4.5	▼67.3
2025	▲136.5	▲7591	▲405.0	▲4.9	▲4.1	▲69.3
2026	▲147.3	▲8020	▲435.2	▲4.5	▲5.9	▲71.6

== Vision 2030 plan ==
Vision 2030 is Kenya's current blueprint for its economic future, with the goal of creating a prosperous, globally-competitive nation with a high quality of life by 2030. The plan aims to transform Kenyan industry and environment in three pillars: economic, social, and political.

=== Economic pillar ===
Vision 2030 seeks economic growth averaging greater than 10% for 23 years, beginning in the year 2007. Economic areas targeted are tourism, agriculture, wholesale and retail trade, manufacturing, IT-enabled services, and financial services.

=== Social pillar ===
To improve the quality of life for Kenyans, Vision 2030 aims to improve human and social welfare programmes, specifically education and training, health, environment, housing and urbanisation, children and social development, and youth and sports. In 2018, President Uhuru Kenyatta established the Big Four Agenda, focusing on universal healthcare, manufacturing, affordable housing and food security.

=== Political pillar ===
The political pillar envisions a "democratic system that is issue-based, transparent, people-centred, results-oriented, and accountable to the public". It targets five main areas: the rule of law under the Constitution of Kenya, electoral and political processes, democracy and public service delivery, transparency and accountability, and security, peace building, and conflict management.

The current Constitution of Kenya was inaugurated on 27 August 2010 to drive this pillar.

== Currency, exchange rate, and inflation ==
Kenya's currency is printed by mandate of the Central Bank of Kenya. The bank began printing banknotes in 1996. Several versions of Kenya's banknotes and coinage have been circulated since then. The most recent redesign of Kenya's currency was in 2019.

The exchange rate of the Kenyan Shilling between 2003 and 2010 averaged about KSh74-78 per US Dollar. Exchange Rate in the first half of 2025 averaged 128 KSh to USD. Currency values in Kenya and elsewhere are influenced by different factors in the short run and long run, and these dynamics are shaped by the country’s choice of exchange rate regime, participation in monetary unions, and vulnerability to currency crises. Kenya’s shilling, for example, is officially market-driven but does not float freely. The Central Bank of Kenya frequently intervenes to influence its value, using foreign currency reserves to stabilize the exchange rate

The average inflation between 2005 and July 2015 was 8.5%. In July 2015 Kenya's inflation rate was estimated to be 6.62%.

== Government finances ==
=== Revenue and spending ===
In 2006, Kenyan government revenue totalled US$4.448B and its estimated expenditures totalled US$5.377B. The government budget balance as a percentage of the gross domestic product improved to −2.1% in 2006 from −5.5% in 2004.

In 2012, Kenya set a budget of US$14.59B with a government revenue of approximately US$12B.

The 2018 budget policy report set a budget of US$30B. The government revenue was approximately US$29.5B, and a deficit of US$5B was borrowed.

In the financial year that ended in June 2020, the Kenya Revenue Authority collected a tax revenue that amounted to approximately US$15B.

=== Government debt ===
From 1982, Kenya key public debt indicators rose above critical levels, both measured as a percentage of GDP and as a percentage of government revenue.

In 2002, the last year of Daniel arap Moi's administration, Kenya' s public debt stood at almost 80% of GDP. In the last 10 years of the Moi regime, the government was spending 94% of all its revenue on salaries and debt servicing to the IMF, World Bank and other western countries.

In 2003, Mwai Kibaki's administration instituted a public debt management department within the treasury department to bring Kenya's debt down to sustainable levels.

In 2006, Kenya had a current account deficit of US$1.5B. This figure was a significant increase over 2005, when the current account had a deficit of US$495 million. In 2006, the current account balance as a percentage of gross domestic product was −4.2.

In 2006, Kenya's external debt totalled US$6.7B. With a GDP of US$25.83B in 2006, the public debt level stood at 27% of GDP.

In 2011, the national treasury noted that the debt was rising, growing to 40% of GDP in 2009 and to 54% of GDP by 2012.

In 2019, Kenya's debt had risen to an absolute amount of US$50B against a GDP of US$98B. The public debt level was 51% of GDP in 2019.

In 2021, Kenya's debt had risen to an absolute amount of US$65B against a GDP of US$101B.The public debt level was 65% of GDP in 2021.

Kenya's largest bilateral lender since 2011 has been China, and the largest multilateral lender since 1963 has been the World Bank.

In April 2025, Kenya secured $600 million in short-term financing from commercial banks to support road construction projects, amid persistent budgetary pressures stemming from sluggish tax revenue growth, high debt servicing costs, and increased spending obligations, including at the county level. The financing, backed by securitised collections from the national fuel levy, set at 18 Kenyan shillings (approximately $0.14) per litre, was arranged through the Kenya Roads Board to enable access to more affordable credit. According to Finance Minister John Mbadi, the funds will be directed toward paying contractors for urgent road maintenance while the government continues to pursue a larger funding arrangement, potentially a $1.5 billion privately placed bond or syndicated loan. This initiative complements broader efforts by President William Ruto’s administration, which came into office in September 2022, to address infrastructure financing gaps. Separately, Kenya plans to issue Africa’s first sustainability-linked bond by November 2025, targeting $500 million to support the national budget and contribute to environmental, social, and energy-related goals. This move is part of the government's strategy to manage an anticipated budget deficit of 3.9% of GDP for the fiscal year ending June 2025.

=== Economic Stimulus Programme ===
The Kenya Economic Stimulus Programme was introduced in the 2010–2011 budget plan. The initiative aimed to stimulate economic activity in Kenya through investment in long-term solutions to food insecurity, rural unemployment and underdevelopment. Stated improvement objectives included regional development for equity and social stability, infrastructure, education, affordable health-care, environmental conservation, information and communications technology capacity, and access to IT.

=== Integrated Financial Management Information System ===
The Integrated Financial Management Information System (IFMIS) was launched in 2003 as a digital platform for Kenya's financial information and services, and was later re-engineered by the Ministry of Finance to curb fraud and other malpractices. IFMIS enables integrated budget planning, being linked to planning policy objectives and budget allocation.

=== Funds for the Inclusion of Informal Sector ===
The Fund for the Inclusion of Informal Sector (FIIS) is a fund that allows businesses in the informal economy to access credit financing and other facilities, including financial and banking services.

=== Investor compensation fund ===
The Investor Compensation Fund compensates investors who suffer losses from breaches of duty by a licensed stockbroker or dealer, up to a maximum of Sh.50,000 per investor.

== Foreign economic relations ==
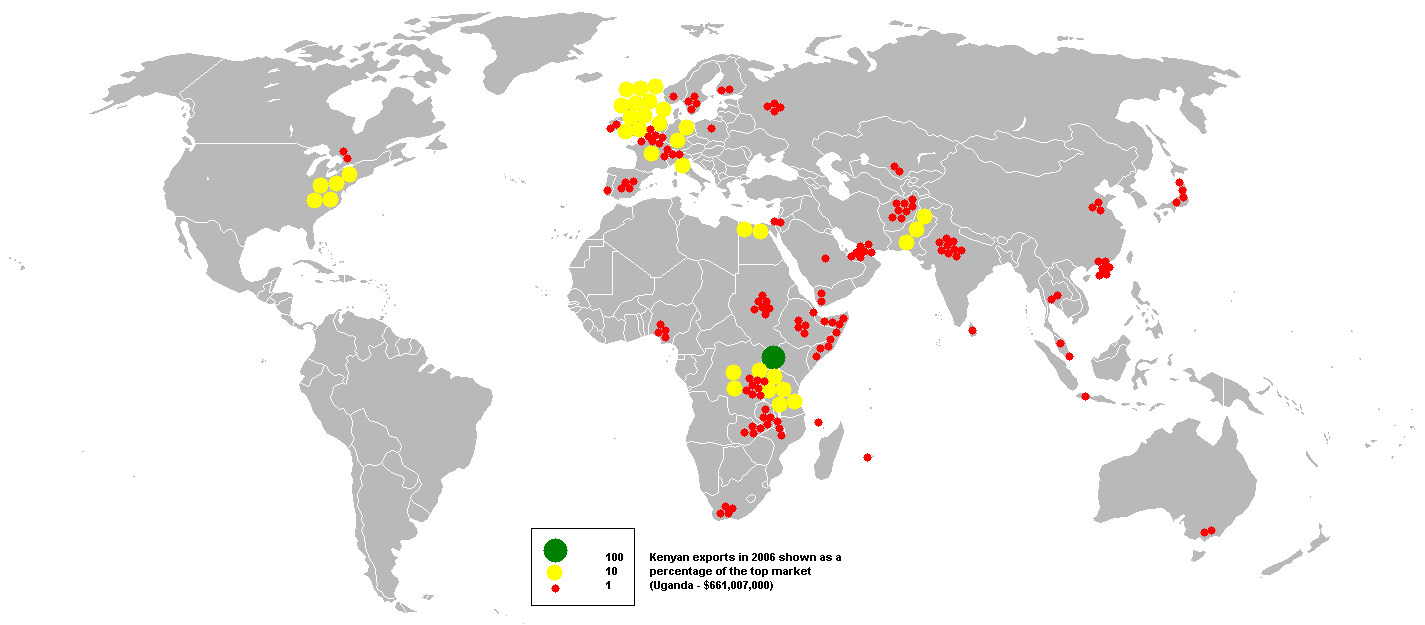
Kenyan exports.

Foreign investments in Kenya remain relatively weak considering the size of its economy and its level of development. As of 2022, Kenya's total FDI stock stood at USD 10.4 billion, accounting for a mere 9.5% of the country’s GDP.

Investments come from China, Japan, Russia, the United States, and the United Kingdom, among others. Kenya hosts a number of foreign multinational companies and international organisations such as the United Nations Environment Programme. China's investments have been increasing, while those of western countries such as the United Kingdom has fallen significantly. Investments from multilateral agencies, particularly the World Bank and the European Development Fund, have also increased. The most active investors currently are the Chinese.

Kenya is active within regional trade blocs such as the Common Market for Eastern and Southern Africa and the East African Community, a partnership of Kenya, Uganda, Tanzania, Rwanda, Burundi and South Sudan. The aim of the latter is to create a common market of its member states modelled on the European Union. Among the early steps toward integration is the bloc's customs union, which has eliminated duties on goods and non-tariff trade barriers among members.

=== Exports ===
Exports of Kenya by product category (2019) Chemical products Transportation Machines Mineral products Plastics and rubbers Metals Foodstuffs Precious metals Textiles Instruments Animal products Vegetable products Paper goods Footwear and headwear Miscellaneous Stone and glass Wood products Animal and vegetable bi-products Animal hides Arts and antiques Weapons

Kenya's chief exports are horticultural products and tea. In 2005, the combined value of these commodities was US$1,150 million, about 10 times the value of Kenya's third most valuable export, coffee. Kenya's other significant exports are petroleum products, fish, cement, pyrethrum, and sisal. The leading imports are crude petroleum, chemicals, manufactured goods, machinery, and transportation equipment. Africa is Kenya's largest export market, followed by the European Union.

The major destinations for exports are Uganda, Tanzania, the United Kingdom, and the Netherlands. Major suppliers are China, India, the United Arab Emirates, Saudi Arabia, and South Africa. Kenya's main exports to the United States are garments traded under the terms of the African Growth and Opportunity Act. Notwithstanding this, Kenya's apparel industry is struggling to hold its ground against Asian competition and runs a trade deficit with the United States. Many of Kenya's problems relating to the export of goods are believed by economists to be caused by the fact that Kenya's exports are inexpensive items that do not bring substantial amounts of money into the country.

Kenya is the dominant trade partner for Uganda (12.3% exports, 15.6% imports) and Rwanda (30.5% exports, 17.3% imports).

=== Balance of trade ===
Kenya typically has a substantial trade deficit. The trade balance fluctuates widely because Kenya's main exports are primary commodities subject to the effects of both world prices and weather. In 2005 Kenya's income from exports was about US$3.2 billion. The payment for imports was about US$5.7B, yielding a trade deficit of about US$2.5B.

Year	Goods exports (million US$)	Goods imports (in million US$)	Net trade (in million US$)
2023	▲$7,220	▲$17,243	▼−$10,023
2020	▲$6,052	▲$14,390	▼−$8,338
2015	▲$5,970	▲$14,349	▼−$8,379
2010	▲$5,211	▲$11,442	▼−$6,231
2005	▲$3,459	▲$5,587	▼−$2,127
2000	▲$1,778	▲$3,022	▼−$1,243
1990	▼$1,090	▼$2,005	▼−$915
1980	$1,421	$2,345	▼−$923

=== Foreign investment policies ===
Kenyan policies on foreign investment generally have been favourable since independence, with occasional tightening of restrictions to promote the africanisation of enterprises. Foreign investors have been guaranteed ownership and the right to remit dividends, royalties, and capital.

Kenya is currently the most important source of foreign direct investments in Uganda and Rwanda. Uganda and its neighbouring regions are the main export destinations for Kenyan products. Kenya has had more success in growing its economy and quality of life levels than many of its neighbours in sub-Saharan Africa.

=== Import procedures ===
Since 3 August 2026, all containerised cargo destined for Kenyan ports must be covered by an Advance Cargo Declaration (ACD). The exporter uploads the draft bill of lading, commercial invoice, freight invoice and export declaration to a platform operated by the Kenya Revenue Authority and obtains an ACD reference code at the point of loading, which must be endorsed on the bill of lading before the shipment reaches Kenya.

== Industries ==
=== Agriculture ===
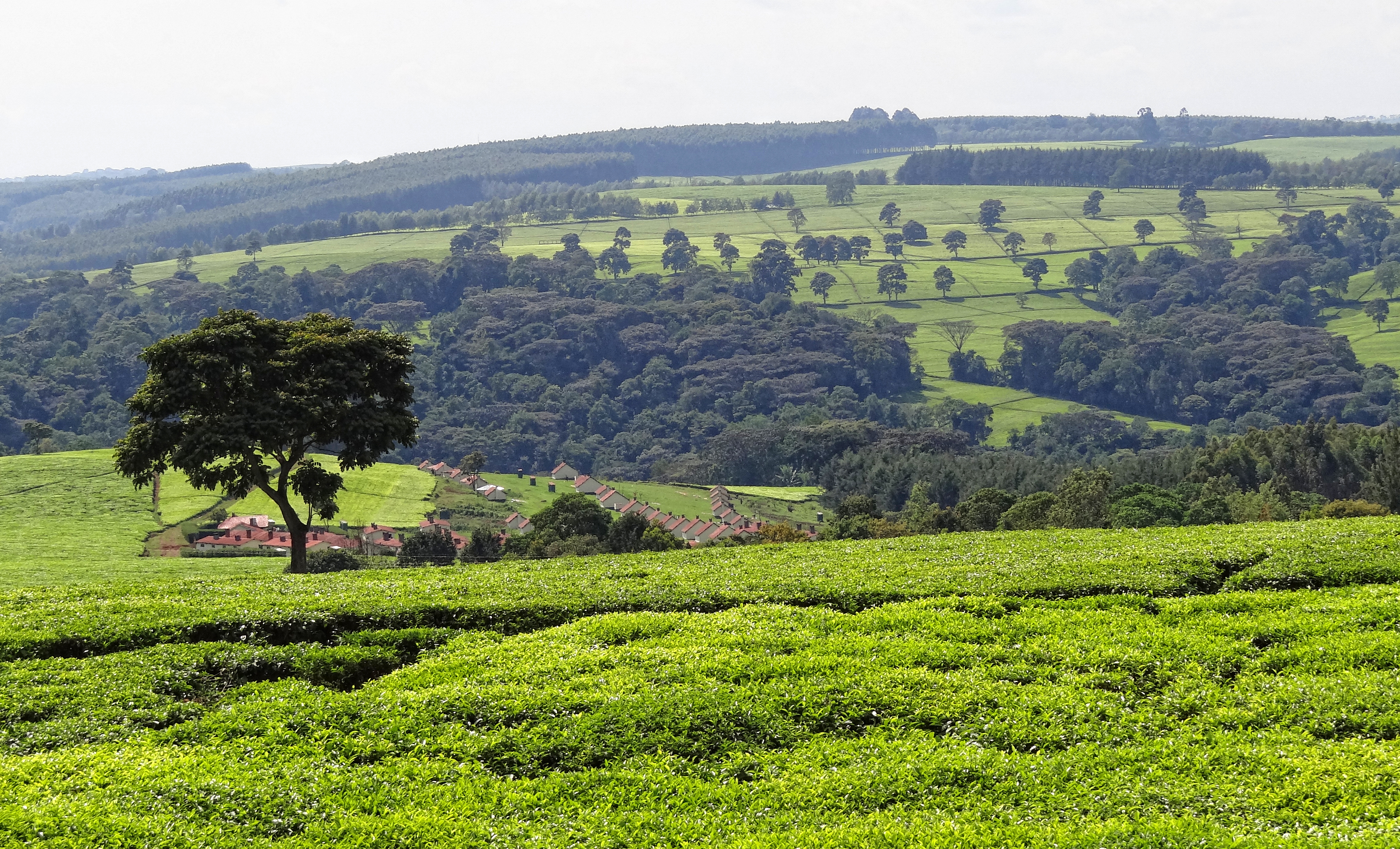
Tea farm, Kericho County

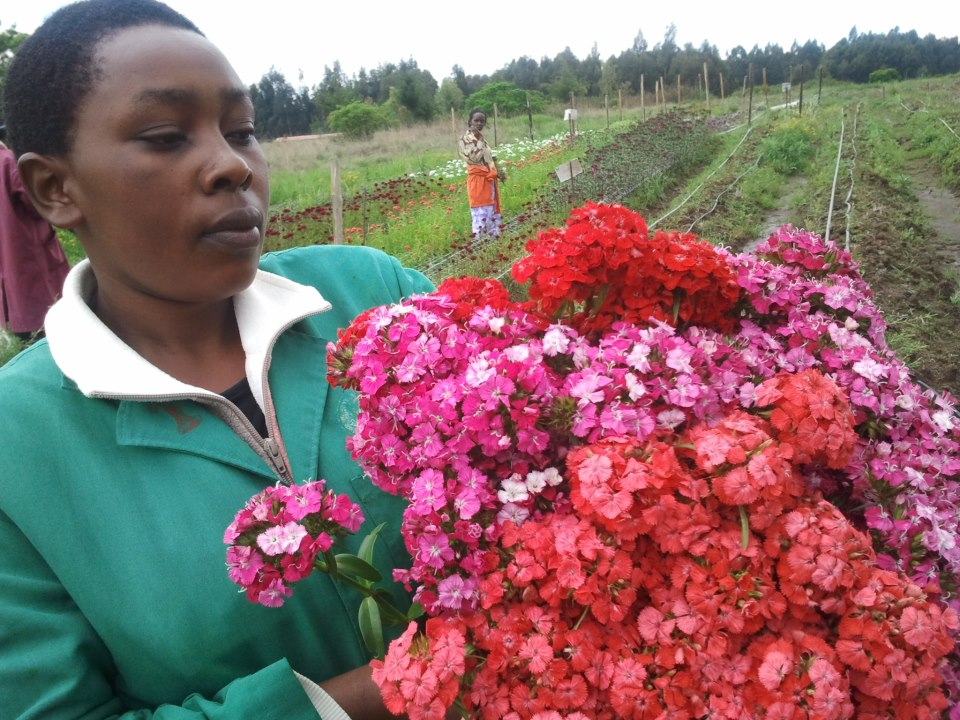
Flower production

Kenya produced in 2018:

- 5.2 million tons of sugarcane;
- 4 million tons of maize;
- 1.8 million tons of potato;
- 1.4 million tons of banana;
- 946 thousand tons of cassava;
- 871 thousand tons of sweet potato;
- 775 thousand tons of mango (including mangosteen and guava);
- 765 thousand tons of beans;
- 599 thousand tons of tomato;
- 674 thousand tons of cabbage;
- 492 thousand tons of tea (3rd largest producer in the world, losing only to China and India);
- 349 thousand tons of pineapple;
- 336 thousand tons of wheat;
- 239 thousand tons of carrot;
- 233 thousand tons of avocado;
- 206 thousand tons of sorghum;
- 188 thousand tons of watermelon;
- 179 thousand tons of cowpea;
- 169 thousand tons of spinach;
- 131 thousand tons of papaya;
- 92 thousand tons of coconut;
- and 41 thousand tons of coffee.

Agriculture is the second largest contributor to Kenya's GDP, after the service sector, although only 15% of Kenya's total land area has sufficient fertility and rainfall to be farmed, and only 7 or 8% can be classified as first-class land. In 2006, almost 75% of working Kenyans made their living on the land, compared with 80% in 1980. About half of total agricultural output is non-marketed subsistence production.

In 2005, agriculture, including forestry and fishing, accounted for about 24% of GDP, as well as for 18% of wage employment and 50% of revenue from exports. That same year, horticulture accounted for 23% and tea for 22% of total export earnings. The principal cash crops in Kenyan agriculture are tea, horticultural produce, and coffee. Coffee has declined in importance with depressed world prices, accounting for just 5% of export receipts in 2005. The production of major food staples such as corn is subject to sharp weather-related fluctuations. Production downturns also periodically necessitate food aid. In 2004, aid was needed for 1.8 million people because of Kenya's intermittent droughts. However, the expansion of credit to the agricultural sector has enabled farmers to better deal with environmental and pricing risks.

Tea, coffee, sisal, pyrethrum, corn, and wheat are grown in the fertile highlands, one of the most successful agricultural production regions in Africa. Livestock predominates in the semi-arid savanna to the north and east. Coconuts, pineapples, cashew nuts, cotton, sugarcane, sisal, and corn are grown in the lower-lying areas.

=== Forestry and fishing ===
Resource degradation has reduced output from forestry. In 2004, roundwood removals came to 22,162,000 cubic meters. Fisheries are of local importance around Lake Victoria and have potential at Lake Turkana. Kenya's total catch in 2004 was 128,000 metric tons. However, output from fishing has been declining because of ecological disruption. Pollution, overfishing, and the use of unauthorised fishing equipment have led to falling catches and have endangered local fish species.

=== Mining and minerals ===
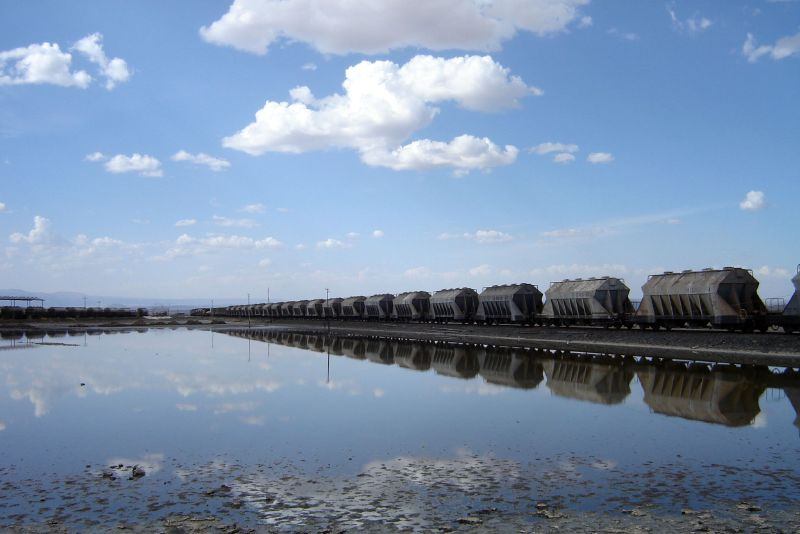
Soda ash train, Lake Magadi, Kajiado County

Kenya has no significant mineral endowment. The mining and quarrying sector makes a negligible contribution to the economy, accounting for less than 1% of GDP. The majority of this is contributed by the soda ash operation at Lake Magadi in south-central Kenya. Thanks largely to rising soda ash output, Kenya's mineral production in 2005 reached more than 1 million tons. One of Kenya's largest foreign-investment projects in recent years is the planned expansion of Magadi Soda. Apart from soda ash, the chief minerals produced are limestone, gold, salt, large quantities of niobium, fluorspar, and fossil fuel.

All unextracted minerals are government property, under the Mining Act. The Department of Mines and Geology, under the Ministry of Environment and Natural Resources, controls exploration and exploitation of minerals.

=== Industry and manufacturing ===
Although Kenya is the most industrially developed country in East Africa, manufacturing still accounts for only 14% of GDP. This represents only a slight increase since independence. The rapid expansion of the sector immediately after independence stagnated in the 1980s, hampered by shortages in hydroelectric power, high energy costs, dilapidated transport infrastructure, and the dumping of cheap imports. However, due to urbanisation, the industry and manufacturing sectors have become increasingly important to the Kenyan economy, and this has been reflected by an increasing GDP per capita. Industrial activity, concentrated around the three largest urban centres, Nairobi, Mombasa, and Kisumu, is dominated by food-processing industries such as grain milling, beer production, sugarcane crushing, and the fabrication of consumer goods. Kenya also has an oil refinery that processes imported crude petroleum into petroleum products, mainly for the domestic market. In addition, a substantial and expanding informal sector engages in small-scale manufacturing of household goods, motor-vehicle parts, and farm implements.

Kenya's inclusion among the beneficiaries of the US Government's African Growth and Opportunity Act gave a boost to manufacturing. Since the Act took effect in 2000, Kenya's clothing sales to the United States increased from US$44 million to US$270M in 2006. Other initiatives to strengthen manufacturing include favourable tax measures, including the absence of duties for capital equipment and other raw materials.

=== Energy ===
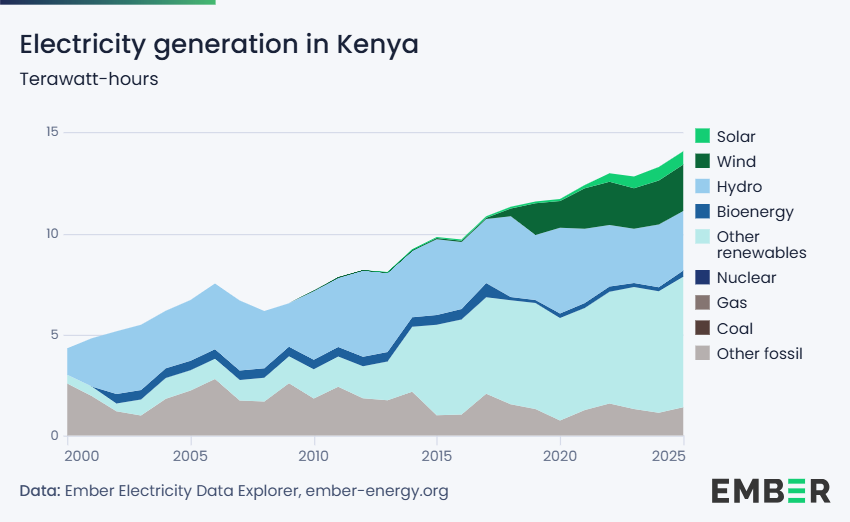
Electricity generation in Kenya in terawatt-hours

The largest segment of Kenya's electricity supply comes from hydroelectric stations at dams along the upper Tana River, as well as the Turkwel Gorge Dam in the west. A petroleum-fired plant on the coast, geothermal facilities at Olkaria, and electricity imported from Uganda make up the balance. Kenya's installed capacity stood at 1,142 megawatts a year between 2001 and 2003. The state-owned Kenya Electricity Generating Company, established in 1997 under the name Kenya Power Company, handles the generation of electricity, while the Kenya Power and Lighting Company handles transmission and distribution. Shortfalls of electricity occur periodically when drought reduces water flow. In 1997 and 2000, for example, drought prompted severe power rationing, with economically-damaging 12-hour blackouts. Frequent outages and high costs of power remain serious obstacles to economic activity. Tax and other concessions are planned to encourage investment in hydroelectricity and in geothermal energy, which Kenya has been a pioneer in adopting.

Kenya currently imports all crude petroleum requirements, with petroleum accounting for 20% to 25% of the national import bill. Hydrocarbon reserves have been found in Kenya's semi-arid northern region of Turkana after several decades of intermittent exploration. Offshore prospecting also continues. Kenya Petroleum Refineries, a 50:50 joint venture between the government and several oil majors, operates the country's sole oil refinery in Mombasa. The refinery's production is transported via Kenya's Mombasa–Nairobi pipeline. However, the refinery is currently non-operational. In 2004, oil consumption was estimated at 55,000 barrels (8,700 m^{3}) a day.

Total energy consumption in Terrawatt-hours (TWh) of Kenya
1980	1990	2000	2010	2020	2021
29	▲36	▲46	▲67	▲99	▲104
Per capita consumption in Kilowatt-hours (KWh)
1,815	▼1,551	▼1,479	▲1,623	▲1,902	▲1,953

=== Tourism ===
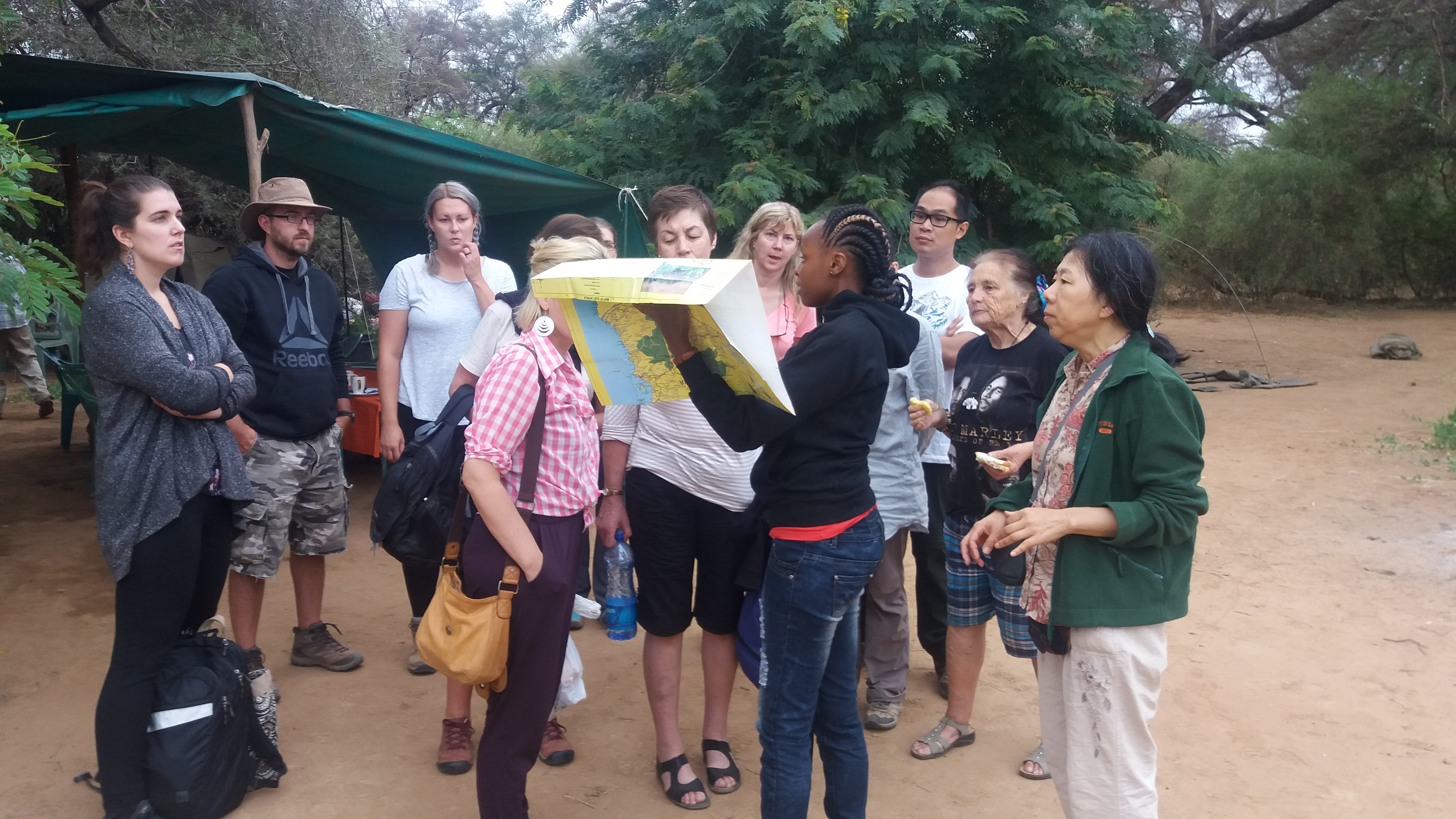
Guided tours.

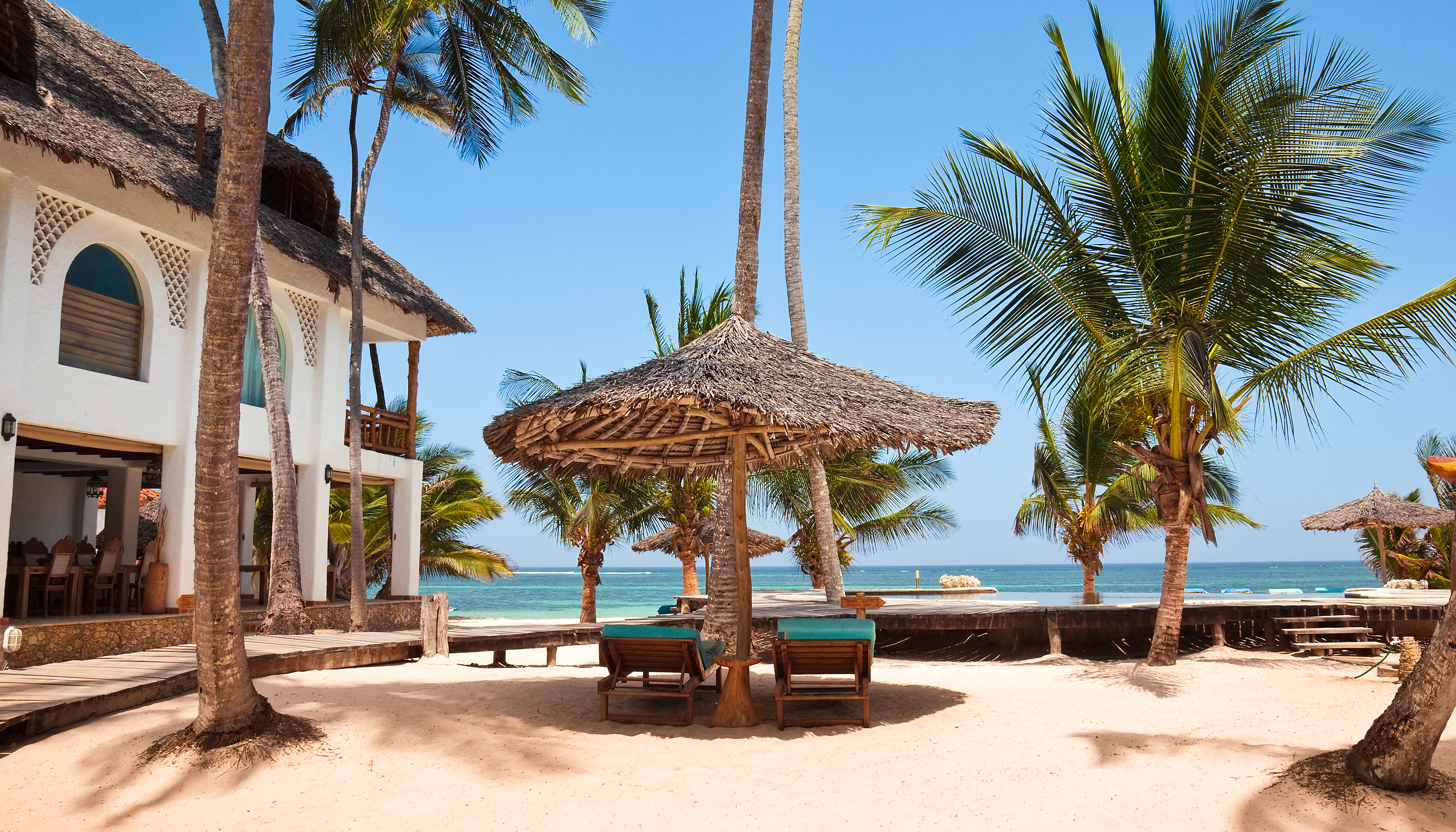
WaterLovers Beach Resort, Diani Beach.

Kenya's dependence on tourism has greatly reduced over the years. Tourism, both domestic and international, accounted for around 6% of Kenya’s economy in 2023. In 2019, foreign tourist revenues stood at $1.76 billion, accounting for only 1.6% of Kenya's GDP and approximately 12% of all international tourism receipts in Eastern Africa.

The growing middle class in Kenya has also led to a significant growth in domestic tourism over the years. This steady growth in domestic tourism has defied the turmoil of elections or terror attacks. In 2014, for the first time, Kenya National Bureau of Statistics data showed that the number of Kenyans accommodated in hotel rooms was higher than that of foreign tourists, pointing to the increasing significance of domestic tourism and highlighting the need for the government to focus on promoting domestic tourism over international visitors as a way of yielding more sustainable growth in the tourism sector

In 2018, domestic tourists’ bed occupancy accounted for 52.9% of the total bed occupancy in the country.

Kenya offers numerous large national parks in a wide variety of landscapes. Besides the coast, there are large deserts, steppes and mountains. The national parks and nature reserves contain the natural habitats of many animal species.

=== Financial services ===
Kenya is East Africa's hub for financial services. The Nairobi Stock Exchange (NSE) is ranked 4th in Africa in terms of market capitalisation.

The banking sector in Kenya is regulated by The Central Bank Of Kenya. Kenya's banking sector is mainly dominated by local commercial banks, namely Equity Bank, Kenya Commercial Bank, NCBA Bank, Diamond Trust Bank, Cooperative Bank, and National Bank. The Kenya Commercial Bank is the largest bank in Kenya by asset size and branch network as of 2023.

Kenya enjoys the presence of a number of high-profile accounting firms. The Big Four firms, Mazars, Grant Thornton International, and PKF International actively operate within the financial system, and are often responsible for the audit of Nairobi Stock Exchange firms.

=== Shipbuilding ===
Kenya’s first commercial-sized ship to be built from scratch—not only in Kenya but also in the whole of East Africa—was launched in October 2023. The 1800-ton vessel, the MV Uhuru II, will ferry goods and petroleum across Lake Victoria.

== Labour ==
In 2022, Kenya's labour force was estimated to include about 24 million workers. In recent years, much of Kenya's labour force has moved from the countryside to cities such as Nairobi, as Kenya becomes increasingly urbanised.

The labour force participation rate in Kenya has been constant from 1997 to 2010 for both women and men. In 1997, 65% of women were employed in some type of labour and 76% of men were employed. In 2005, 60% of women and 70% of men were in the labour force, increasing slightly to 61% of women and 72% of men in 2010.

In the past 20 years, many Kenyans have moved away from family farming towards wage labour, small business entrepreneurship, and informal work. In 1989, 4.5 million Kenyans out of a total working population of 7.3M worked on family farms. In 2009, only 6.5M Kenyans out of a total working population of 14.3M worked on family farms. Of these, 3.8M were women and 2.7M were men.

According to the World Bank 2012 Kenya Economic Update, modern wage jobs include being an "engineer, telecommunication specialist, cut flower worker, teacher, construction worker, housekeepers, professionals, any industrial and manufacturing job, and port and dock workers." In 1989, there were only 1.9M Kenyans employed in wage work. In 2009, this number increased to 5.1M, with 3.4M men and 1.3M women were employed in wage jobs.

=== Informal economy ("Jua Kali") ===
In Kenya, the "Jua Kali" sector is another name for the informal economy, also described as non-farming self-employment. Jua Kali is Swahili for "hot sun" and refers to the idea that the workers in the informal economy work under the fierce sun. The informal sector consists of legally unrecognised and unregulated self-employment and wage employment. As a result, informal sector employment does not contribute to Kenya's GDP. Non-farm self-employment has risen from 1989 to 2009.

The World Bank characterises non-farm self-employment to include jobs such as "street vendor, shop owner, dressmaker, assistant, fishmonger, caterer, etc." Non-farm self-employment has risen from a total of 0.9 million workers in 1989 to a total of 2.7 million in 2009. Men make up 1.4 million workers, and women workers number 1.3 million.

As of 2009, Kenya's informal economy accounts for about 80% of the total employment for the country. Most informal workers are self-employed, with few entrepreneurs employing others. The informal sector contributes economic activity equal to 35% of the total GDP in Kenya, and has its own informal finance structure in the form of rotating savings and credit associations. This sector provides an income mainly for those in lower socioeconomic groups.

Drawbacks of the informal economy include the promotion of smuggling and tax evasion and the lack of social and legal protection. Most members of the informal sector have low educational attainment. Rising costs of education and uncertainty about future employment have caused many workers to enter the informal economy, due to lower entry fees as well as shorter and practical training and apprenticeships.

=== Human capital ===
Kenya has one of the best human capital in Africa. According to the World Bank's 2019 Human Capital Index (HCI), which measured human capital of the next generation, Kenya ranked first in sub-Saharan Africa with an HCI score of 0.52. The index combined several key indicators, such as school enrolment, child survival, quality of learning, healthy growth and adult survival into a single index ranging between 0–1.

== Challenges ==
The economy's heavy dependence on rain for its agriculture leaves it vulnerable to periods of high inflation during droughts. The agricultural sector employs nearly 33% of the total labour force.

Kenya's economic performance had for a long time been hampered by various factors: heavy dependence on a few agricultural exports vulnerable to global price fluctuations; population growth which has outstripped economic growth; prolonged droughts requiring power rationing; deteriorating infrastructure; and extreme income inequality. Some of these issues have been addressed by policies, with GDP growth increasing, population growth slowing, rapid infrastructural improvements being made and increased electrification rates with more stable power supplies.

Poor governance and corruption also have had a negative impact on growth, making it expensive to do business in Kenya.

Despite these challenges, two thirds of Kenyans expect living conditions to improve in the coming decades.

== See also ==
- Economy of East Africa
- Category: Companies of Kenya
- List of counties of Kenya by GDP
- List of counties of Kenya by poverty rate
- Eco-Pesa
- Vision 2030
- Central Bank of Kenya
- United Nations Economic Commission for Africa
- Kenya Trade Data
