= Triple Stimulus Voucher =

2020 voucher issued by Taiwan

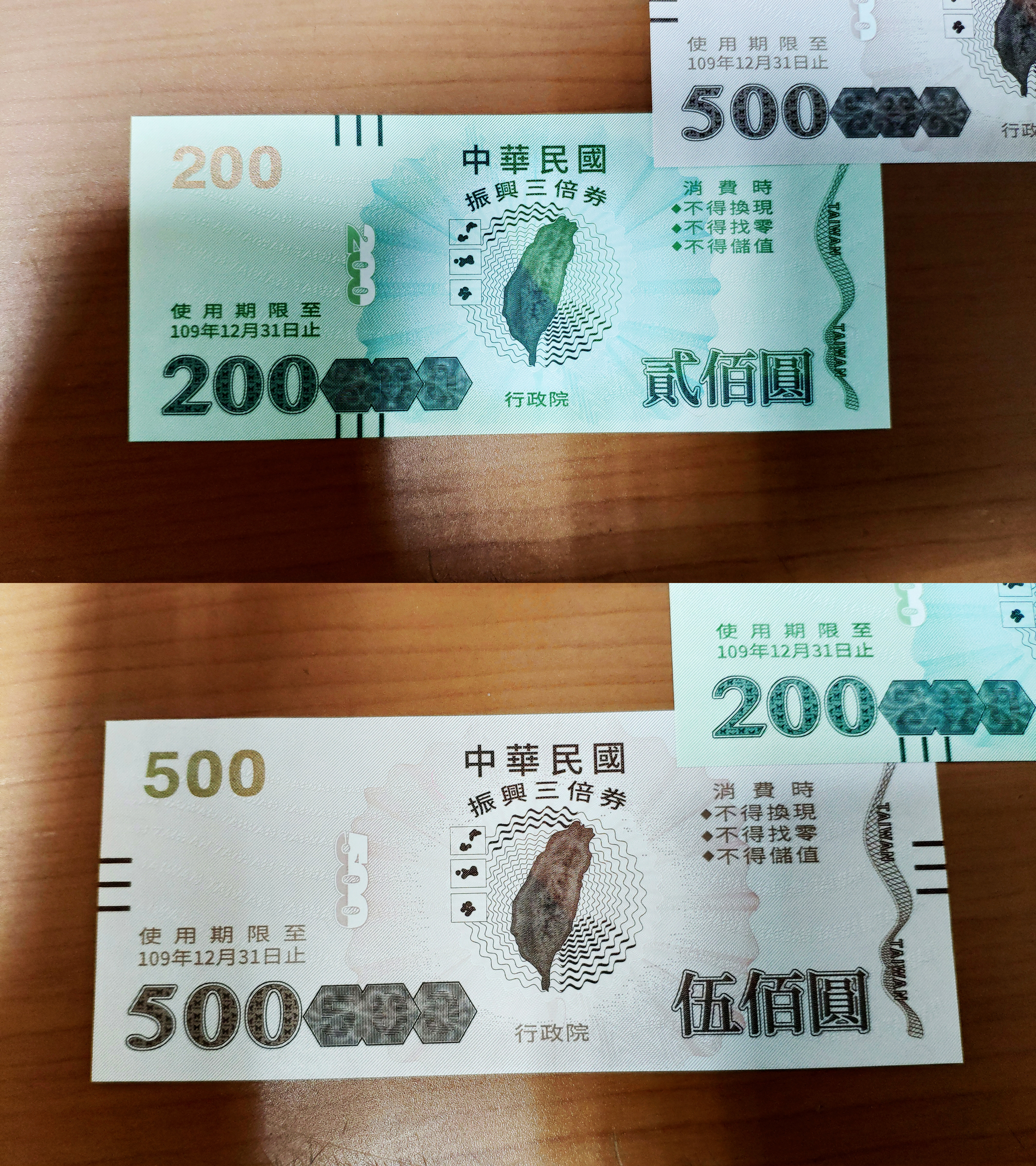
- The Triple Stimulus Vouchers
- Traditional Chinese: 振興三倍券
- Simplified Chinese: 振兴三倍券
- Literal meaning: Revitalization triple coupon
Transcriptions
Standard Mandarin
- Hanyu Pinyin: Zhènxīng sān bèi quàn
- Wade–Giles: Chên-hsing san-bei-ch'üan
Hakka
- Romanization: Chṳn-hîn sâm-phi-khién
Yue: Cantonese
- Jyutping: Zan^{3}hing^{1} saam^{1} pui^{5} hyun^{3}
Southern Min
- Hokkien POJ: Chín-heng sam-pē-koàn

Triple Stimulus Vouchers were a series of vouchers issued in response to the 2020 Coronavirus recession by the government of the Republic of China as part of its post-epidemic revitalisation of the business climate in the country, as the economy of Taiwan took a major hit from the global pandemic.

The Triple Stimulus Vouchers were valid from July 15 to December 31, 2020, or about 6 months in total. A 200-point voucher equaled NT$200, and a 500-point equaled NT$500. The total amount of vouchers received per person was 3,000 points (NT$3,000), 5,200-point vouchers and 4,500-point.

== History ==
=== Background ===
The economic impact of the COVID-19 pandemic had affected the Republic of China as soon as they took preventative measures to combat it, and the Executive Yuan under Tsai Ing-wen had issued government bailouts to help stimulate the economy as early as February 2020. Further bills were passed to help stimulate the economy in March, April, and May. The Triple Stimulus Vouchers were likewise an attempt to help stimulate the economy and were not without precedent as the government of the Republic of China had issued economic stimulus vouchers before in 2009.

The Democratic Progressive Party introduced the Triple Stimulus Vouchers with the motivation that they would not only stimulate business opportunities, but they would also encourage people to spend more time with their family and friends, and that they can also stimulate the consumption habits of people who do not usually spend time outside.

=== Rollout ===
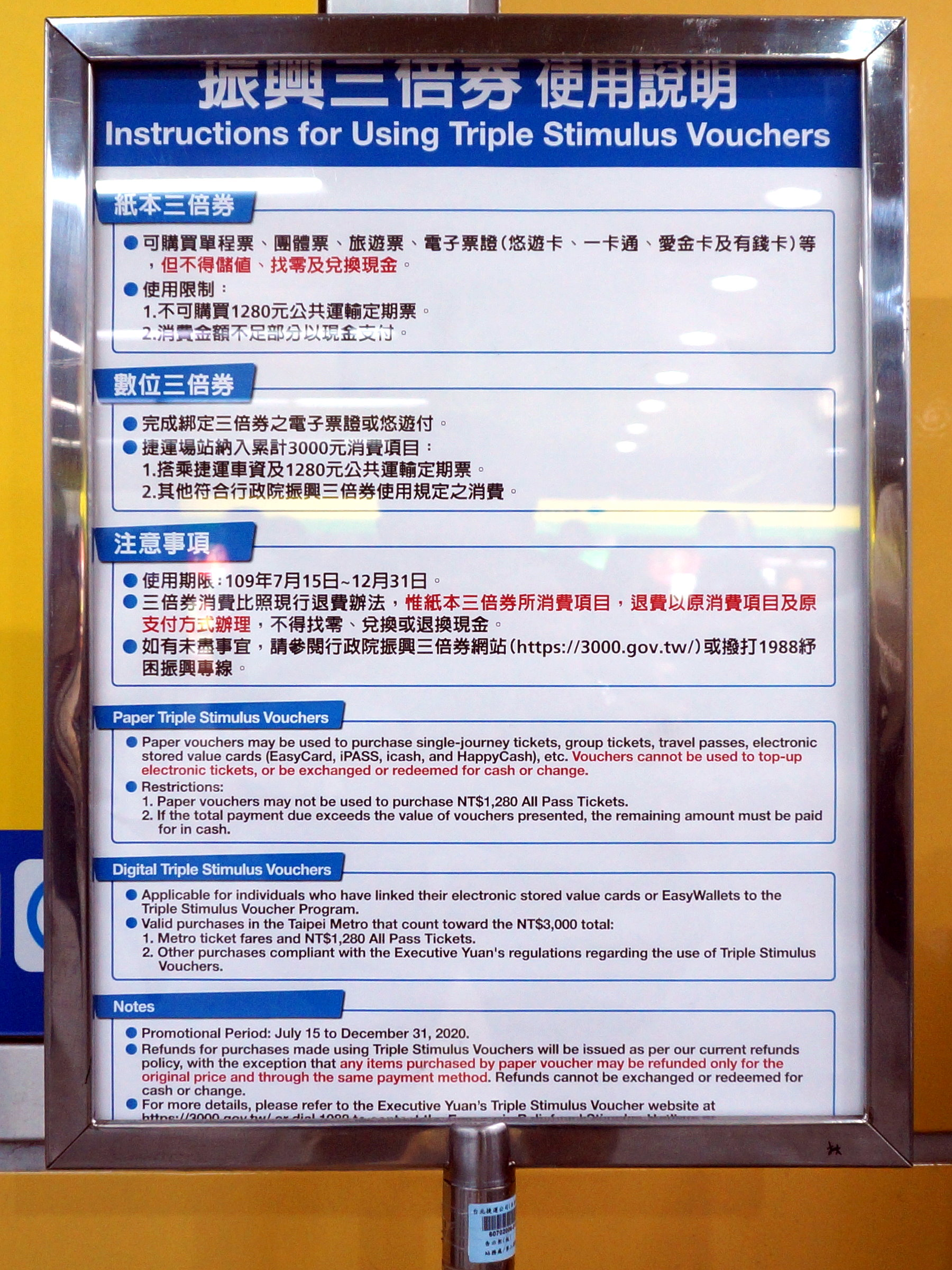
Instructions for using the Triple Stimulus Vouchers at Taipei City Hall, Taipei.

These vouchers were available in two forms, people could register to receive them as physical vouchers which resembled banknotes or as digital vouchers that could be used on the internet tied to electronic payments, e-ticket, credit cards, as well as other digital consumption models.

To boost consumer spending, people were encouraged to purchase NT$3,000 worth of Triple Stimulus Vouchers for NT$1,000. At the same time the Ministry of Transportation and Communications, the Council of Agriculture, the Sports Administration, the Ministry of Culture, and the Hakka Affairs Council also issued their own vouchers and coupons to help boost more specific sectors of the economy.

List of stimulus vouchers issued in response to the Coronavirus recession by the government of the Republic of China:

Name (Traditional Chinese)	Issuing office	Monetary value	Where people could register	Where and how people could spend them	Eligibility	Number of eligible people that would receive the vouchers	Dates of validity
Triple Stimulus Voucher (振興三倍券)	Ministry of Economic Affairs	NT$3000 (with NT$1,000 upfront payment)	https://emake.3000.gov.tw/hpg/index.jsp	Shop at selected stores, buy train tickets, and even pay for taxi fares.	Republic of China citizens, newborns born before 2020/12/31, and spouses of Taiwanese (ROC) nationals who hold residency permits.	23,150,000	15 July 2020–31 December 2020
Culture Voucher (藝FUN券)	Ministry of Culture	NT$600	Through a dedicated smartphone app.	Bookstores, cinemas, museums, performance venues, record stores, Etc.	Republic of China citizens and foreign spouses who hold residency permits.	2,000,000	22 July 2020–31 December 2020
Agriculture Traveling Voucher (電子版農遊券)	Council of Agriculture	NT$250	https://eticket.coa.gov.tw/	At agricultural experience activities, specialties at leisure farms, forest recreation areas, among others outside of the area where the holder resided.	Republic of China citizens and foreign spouses who hold residency permits.	5,000,000	15 July 2020–31 December 2020
Sports Voucher (or "Don" Voucher) (動滋券)	Sports Administration	NT$500	https://don500.sa.gov.tw/FOAS/actions/SportsAdmin.action	To watch sports in a stadium or shop for sporting goods.	Republic of China citizens and foreign spouses who hold residency permits.	4,000,000	1 August 2020–31 December 2020
Hakka E-Coupon (客家電子旅遊券)	Hakka Affairs Council	NT$800	Through the official LINE account of the Hakka Affairs Council (@hakka_gov).	70 special promotion zones in 11 cities.	Republic of China citizens and foreign spouses who hold residency permits. (Note: The first round of registrations for the Hakka E-Coupon was specially designed for families with elderly members (those aged 65 and above) while the second round was open for everyone to register. With the results of those who would receive the vouchers announced on July 20 and July 27, respectively.)	280,000	1 August 2020–31 December 2020

The total value of the stimulus vouchers issued by the various government organisations a single eligible person could receive added up to 5150 New Taiwan dollars.

Initially the Ministry of Economic Affairs sought to only issue them digitally, but then under the pressure of public opinion they also launched these vouchers as paper certificates. These consumer digital vouchers could be used through a website set up by the Republican Chinese government at "https://3000.gov.tw/". In order to incentivise people to choose for the digital vouchers the Ministry of Economic Affairs launched a campaign where users of the digital vouchers could win a Gogoro VIVA Lite. With the winners of the first wave of motor vehicles being drawn from July 6 to July 15 for 10 consecutive days, 1 draw every day, and the second wave of winners would be announced from July 16 to September 31. The campaign would last a total of 15 weeks, and during the second round a winner was to be drawn out of once every week, with a total of 25 motor vehicles available for the draw.

Eligible people could book them from July 1st, 2020. By the afternoon of 3 July over 3 million people (or about 67.6% of all eligible people) had already registered to receive these vouchers. Of these registrations over 70% of the people opted to receive them as paper certificates while only 30% opted for the digital versions.

Rollout rounds and collection dates for Triple Stimulus Vouchers:

Round	Pre-ordering dates	Collection date
Round 1	1–7 July 2020	15–31 July 2020
Round 2	8–12 July 2020	22–31 July 2020
Round 3	1–7 August 2020	15–31 August 2020

The Executive Yuan originally estimated that the printing of 3,000,000 copies for the public would obviously be insufficient, and in respond to the large demand for physical vouchers tripled the production and the President of the Executive Yuan of the Republic of China, Su Tseng-chang, responded that the people wouldn't need to worry about delays. Local governments and small businesses reportedly told people to book as early as possible so there would be minimal delay during the rollout.

Eligible people were able to order it to be picked up at either selected stores or to purchase them directly at post offices.

By August 2,000 businesses had applied to be included on the list of authorised shops and locations for the Agriculture Traveling Voucher (電子版農遊券), a related voucher programme which was launched by the Council of Agriculture with the hopes of revitalising Taiwan's agriculture, forestry, fishery, and animal husbandry industries.

Small and Medium Enterprise Administration Director-General Ho Chin-tsang (何晉滄) told reporters that by Tuesday 27 October 2020, 22,890,000 people had purchased the Triple Stimulus Vouchers, or 96% of the eligible people.

As of 27 October 2020 the paper Triple Stimulus Vouchers were selected by 21.09 million people, while only 1.8 million people chose the electronic versions of the vouchers, with only 910,000 eligible people at the time still needing to collect their Triple Stimulus Vouchers.

=== Criticisms ===
A number of pundits argued that the economy of Taiwan would recover in the third quarter of 2020 regardless if the Triple Stimulus Vouchers were issued or not and claimed that their issuance would only slow down the Q2 decline, rather than halt it.

Some people expressed that "issuing more than 10 million Triple Stimulus Vouchers is equivalent to more than 10 million pieces of plastic." They criticised the government of the Republic of China for refusing to taking the lead in environmental protection and undermining the plastic restriction policy.

The Kuomintang caucus in the Legislative Yuan claimed that the public's response to the Triple Stimulus Vouchers was that they were "difficult to obtain, difficult to exchange, and created triple the amount of complaints". The Kuomintang further said that the market vendors and self-employed businesspeople could not be "revitalised" by the vouchers as it did not offer the ability to get change and that these coupons were not useful for making small transactions creating cash flow pressure. The Kuomintang group called on Executive Yuan to quickly come up with specific measures to improve the inconvenience of the market vendors in accepting the Triple Stimulus Vouchers and to quickly find more specific ways to revitalise the economy rather than this "lotto-style" attempt.

The Kuomintang argued that only when budgets are delegated to county governments and city governments and to put forward local conditions are to revitalise the economy can the intended "triple effect" truly be achieved.

Ko Wen-je of the Taiwan People's Party noted that the timespan of the Triple Stimulus Vouchers was too brief to have the intended effect on the economy and that the Democratic Progressive Party and the Executive Yuan should look for other ways to stimulate the economy.

Wang Shih-chien argued that Triple Stimulus Vouchers, like the earlier stimulus vouchers from 2009, would cost over a billion yuan to implement and would be invalidated as soon as four to five months after their issue. He called the implementation of the Triple Stimulus Vouchers "slow, dumb, and wasteful" and called for Su Tseng-chang and the rest of the Executive Yuan to change their mentality.

=== Expansion of the programme ===
On 16 November 2020 the Ministry of Economic Affairs announced that the eligibility of the Triple Stimulus Vouchers would be expanded to both Alien Permanent Resident Certificate (APRC) and foreign diplomats. The Ministry of Economic Affairs noted that people who would pick up paper Triple Stimulus Vouchers at post offices should bring either their health insurance card or their Alien Permanent Resident Certificate as well as NT$1000 pay for the vouchers.

Alternatively, these newly eligible foreign residents could register online for the digital version with a credit card by a local bank, stored value cards, or mobile payments.

=== Near their expiry date ===
In December 2020 many shops started offering discounts to people that did not use their voucher yet as they neared their expiration date.

When the program ended on Thursday 31 December 2020, 98.35% of eligible residents of the Republic of China had claimed the Triple Stimulus Vouchers, with 21,510,000 people having obtained paper vouchers and 1,810,000 electronic vouchers.

== Effect on the economy ==
In an October 2020 report by the Ministry of Economic Affairs the various voucher and coupon programmes had tripled business revenue.

According to Small and Medium Enterprise Administration Director-General Ho Chin-tsang the Triple Stimulus Vouchers had triggered a buying spree which was reflected in both business revenue as well as government tax income. This was seen by the growth in July retail sales, which ended a five-month a contraction caused by the COVID-19 pandemic.

Retail sales in the Republic of China set historical single-month highs in August 2020, as did the sales in the restaurant sector and the beverages sector.

Kung Ming-hsin of the National Development Council said that the Triple Stimulus Voucher programme had contributed NT$100 billion to Taiwan's GDP. The Ministry of Economic Affairs noted that the retail and food sectors benefited the most from the voucher programme, with both sectors recording their highest ever monthly revenue during the second half of 2020.

Chen Hui-hsin (陳惠欣) of the Directorate-General of Budget, Accounting and Statistics stated that the COVID-19 pandemic had diminished consumer activity in Taiwan during the first quarter of 2020, pushing up the unemployment rate to 4.07% in May. The situation then started to improve after July 2020, which Chen attributed a boom in domestic tourism after infections were brought under control and the Triple Stimulus Voucher programme. By January 2020 the unemployment rate had dropped to 3.68%.

== Design ==
The 2020 triple stimulus vouchers were offered in two variants, one of 200 New Taiwan dollars and one of 500 New Taiwan dollars. They both featured a map of the Republic of China (island of Taiwan and the other free areas) on the obverse with the denomination as well as the expiration date for final usage using the Chinese republican calendar (使用期限至109年12月31日止). Above the map the text "中華民國 - 振興三倍券" (Republic of China - Triple Stimulus Voucher) appeared, while both notes contained a notice of the limitations that they cannot be exchanged for cash (不得換現金, bù dé huàn xiàn jīn), no change (不得找零錢, bù děi zhǎo líng qián), no stored value (不得儲值, bù dé chǔ zhí). The vouchers both featured security features and on the right side was the word "TAIWAN" written in Latin script.

The 200 point (worth NTD 200) voucher green in colour, while the 500 point (worth NTD 500) variant is red.

== Counterfeits ==
On August 13, 2020, prosecutors from Yunlin County found the first case of counterfeit Triple Stimulus Vouchers and arrested Su Qingwu, who is known as the "president of the underground central bank", and had counterfeited 2.5 million yuan worth of Triple Stimulus Vouchers. Su Qingwu is known to have more than 30 years of experience in producing counterfeit banknotes and has been arrested multiple and imprisoned multiple times before. These counterfeit vouchers were all produced within a span of 12 days.

== See also ==
- Special Act for Prevention, Relief and Revitalization Measures for COVID-19
