= Economic Stimulus Appropriations Act of 1977 =

Economic Stimulus Appropriation Act
- Long title: An Act making economic stimulus appropriations for the fiscal year ending September 30, 1977, and for other purposes
- Enacted by: the 95th United States Congress
- Effective: May 13, 1977

Citations
- Public law: 95-29
- Statutes at Large: 91 Stat. 122

Legislative history
- Introduced in the House as H.R. 1 by George H. Mahon (D-TX) on March 10, 1977; Committee consideration by Appropriations; Passed the House on March 15, 1977 (281-126); Passed the Senate on May 2, 1977 (63-15); Reported by the joint conference committee on May 3, 1977; agreed to by the House on May 4, 1977 (326-87) and by the Senate on May 5, 1977 (); Signed into law by President Jimmy Carter on May 13, 1977

The Economic Stimulus Appropriations Act of 1977 was a stimulus package enacted by the 95th Congress and signed into law by President Jimmy Carter on 13 May 1977. Developed in response to the longest and deepest economic recession post World War II, the primary objective of the stimulus package was to provide the economy with a boost.

The bill's rationale was based on Keynesian economic theory, providing tax reductions and increasing jobs to boost private spending, preventing the economy from any further slowdown. The approximate cost of the bill was estimated to be $20.1 billion spread across 1977 and 1978, where the act helped to create 9.3 million jobs, the largest increase in job creation for any presidency. The act was one of a number of contributing factors that accentuated the second surge of stagflation in 1979, which was apparent when Carter took over the office but worsened towards the end of his term.

The politics around the stimulus made the act highly controversial. The Republicans felt that the act was overcompensating, while on the left, many Democrats felt that the act was not doing enough and was not big enough. Economist Milton Friedman argued that the tax cut would have little effect on consumption and GDP.

== Initial bill ==
President Carter announced that unemployment would be his primary concerns when he entered office on January 20, 1977. The Economic Stimulus Appropriation Act was initially introduced as a $31.1 billion fiscal stimulus package. The package was drafted by Treasury Secretary W. Michael Blumenthal; Charles L. Schultze, chairman of the Council of Economic Advisers; and Budget Director Bert Lance. The bill was immediately met with mixed responses, with many suggesting that it was a "minimax solution". The initial bill had two components; the first part included a tax cut for both households and businesses, accompanied by a simple tax rebate of $50 which would be given to all citizens. The goal of this component would be to provide a boost for the slowing economy. The second part was an extensive job program, that would help with job creation to tackle the growing unemployment.

== Legislative history ==
A week after President Carter took office, aides of Carter began to appear in front of committees of Congress, explaining the contents of the stimulus package. The components of the act were developed during the transitional period before Carter was inaugurated.

=== House of Representatives ===
The House version of the bill was introduced on 10 March 1977. It was sponsored by Democrat George H. Mahon, the chairman of the United States House Committee on Appropriations. On 4 May 1977, the House passed the bill by a 281-126 vote.

=== Senate ===
The Senate version of the bill was introduced on 17 March 1977; this version of the bill was heavily criticized as it saw the removal of the $50 tax rebate and the tax cut for businesses. Charles L. Schultze, chairman of the Council of Economic Advisers, justified the removal claiming that the economy appeared to be more stimulated than anticipated and the provisions were redundant.

Although both parties were unhappy with the original provisions, Carter faced further criticism after announcing that the $50 tax rebate and business tax credits would be removed from the bill. This time the criticism came from both the Democrats and Republicans from the Senate Budget Committee. The Democratic Senator, chairman of the Senate Budget Committee, Edmund S. Muski and Republic Senator Henry S. Bellmon condemned the sudden removal. Senator Bellmon said by withdrawing the cornerstone of his stimulus package; the President has left the budget process "with egg on its face." In response to these statements, Michael Blumenthal defended the removal by stating that there was a growing belief within the team that leaving the rebate in would be "unwise".

The initial bill also included a $50 per person tax rebate, which Carter proposed during his campaign, claiming that it would better help stimulate the economy. A temporary business tax cut was also included, providing small businesses with an opportunity to reduce their payroll. These provisions were introduced to help improve demand and boost the economy. However, they were faced with heavy criticism when introduced to the House committee, arguing the impact of the rebate and considerations for more favorable alternatives such as a permanent tax cut. The provision's removal was faced with heavy criticism from both sides of the party, as Congress had to amend its 1977 budget process in order to integrate the bill. The withdrawal was deemed by many as "a body blow to the Congressional budget process".

Despite the discontent, Senate voted, 63 - 15 to end the debate on the bill and advanced it on May 2, 1977.

=== Conference report ===
The congressional negotiators reported that the Conference Report was completed on 3 May 1977. The House Majority Leader Robert Byrd scheduled a vote on the bill the next day. On 4 May, the House agreed to the Conference Report, 326 - 87. The reported was passed by the majority except for 17 Democrats voted for the bill, and 70 Republicans voted against it (19 congress members did not vote).

The Senate passed the Conference Report on 5 May 1977.

== Presidential signing ==
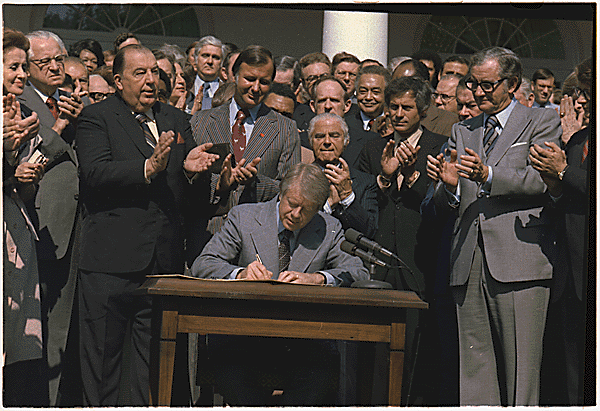
Jimmy Carter signing the Economic Appropriations Act.

On 13 May 1977, President Carter hosted 25 mayors from the country's most financially struggling cities to watch him sign the $20.1 billion bill into law. The signing ceremony was held at the White House Rose Garden.

== Provisions of the act ==
The following are the main features of the bill:

=== Public service employment ===
- $7.9 billion: Public Service Jobs would be expanded from 310,000 to 725,000 jobs.
- Youth Employment Programs to create over 200,000 jobs for young people.

=== Tax reduction ===
- $5 billion: Increase in the standard deduction, primarily targeted at moderate and low-income workers.

=== Public works projects ===
- $4 billion

=== Regular revenue-sharing program ===
- $4.99 billion

== Job creation program ==
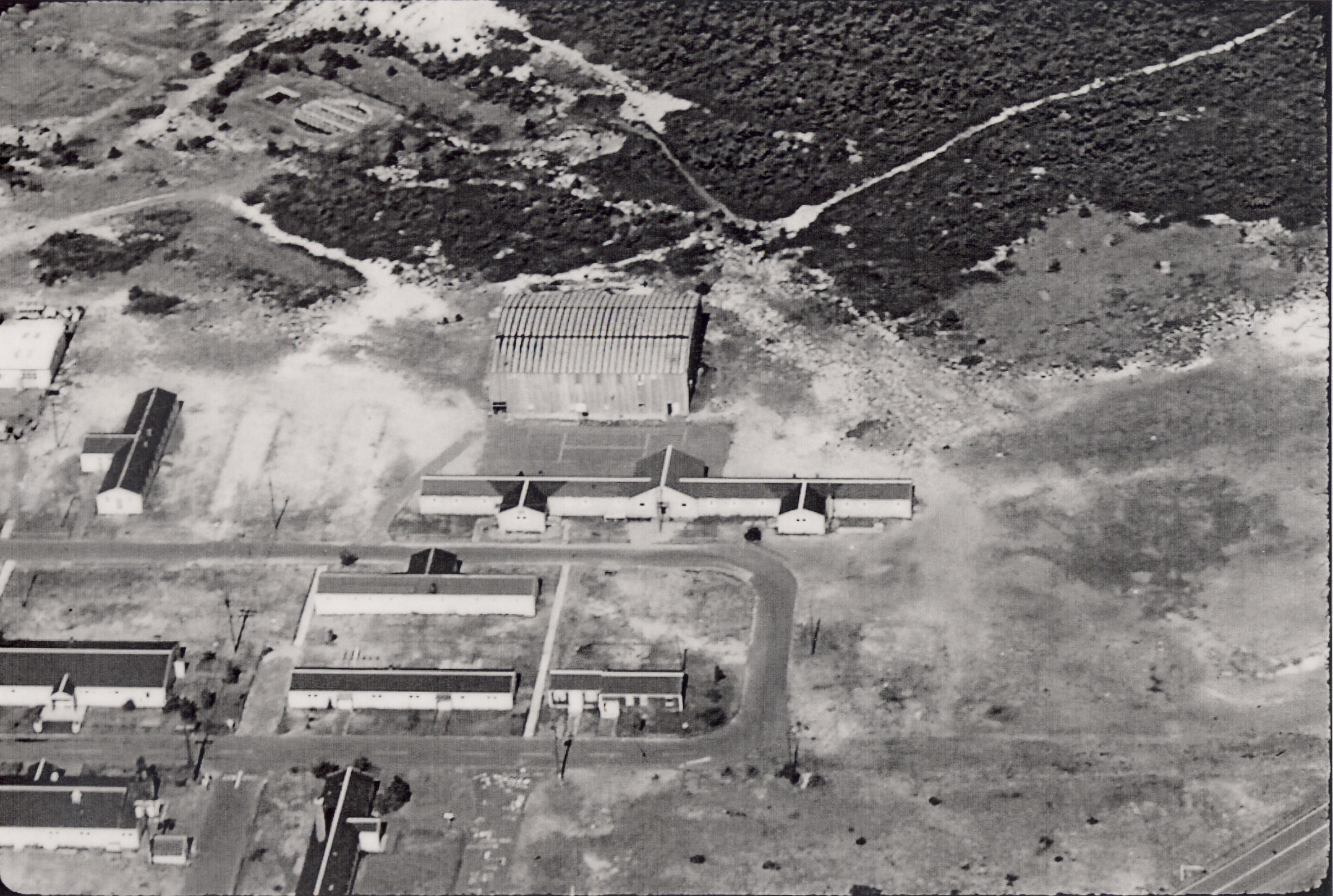
Job Corps Training Center, Wellfleet

Under the stimulus package, it provided further support and funding for the Comprehensive Employment and Training Act (CETA), which was aimed to provide training for workers and jobs in the public sector. The added funds helped to expand the role and capacity of the Job Corps, a program operated by the Department of Labor that provided education and vocational training to youths between the age of 16 to 24. The bill assisted the program to open new residential centers and increased its capacity from 22,000 to 30,000. Additionally, there was also an increase in funding for the program, providing it with $274 million.

Additional funding was also given to programs to help train unskilled workers such as the Skill Training Improvement Program (STIP), a program that provides training to low-income and unskilled workers, especially to those located in rural regions and Native Americans.

A few programs were created as part of the stimulus to help boost the employment rate. The Veterans HIRE (Help through Industry Retraining and Employment) program was formed to train and hire veterans. Focusing on decrease the unemployment rate among veterans, with the program prioritizing those that are disabled or were involved in the Vietnam War.

Under Carter's administration, the government formed the largest public service job program, adding a total of 9.8 million jobs during his presidency. A 10.9% increase in employment during his four-year tenure.

== Recommendations by economists ==
Initially, when the bill was first introduced, Arthur F. Burns, the Federal Reserve Board chairman, was critical of President Carter's economic program. Burns targeted the $50 tax rebate, stating that the reserve does not have enough money and would not be the most effective method in stimulating the economy. In turn, he suggested that the government reduce levies in corporate tax, and public employment should only be established as a last resort.

The New York Times commented on President Carter for attempting to please all sides. In a news analysis piece, they wrote, "He was in truth the very model of an agreeable man." This statement was to criticize Carter of only surrounding himself with people who agreed with him and at the same time, agreed with all the advice that he received from others.

Professor Milton Friedman of the University of Chicago favored permanent income tax cuts as compared to job creation through federal spending. He suggested a permanent tax cut followed by a maximum tax of 25 percent off an individual's income and elimination of double taxation of corporate profits. Friedman claimed that it would help to eliminate the "real tax burden" or government expenditures that the stimulus package would have inflationary effects on the economy and will fail to improve employment.

== Congressional Budget Office reports ==
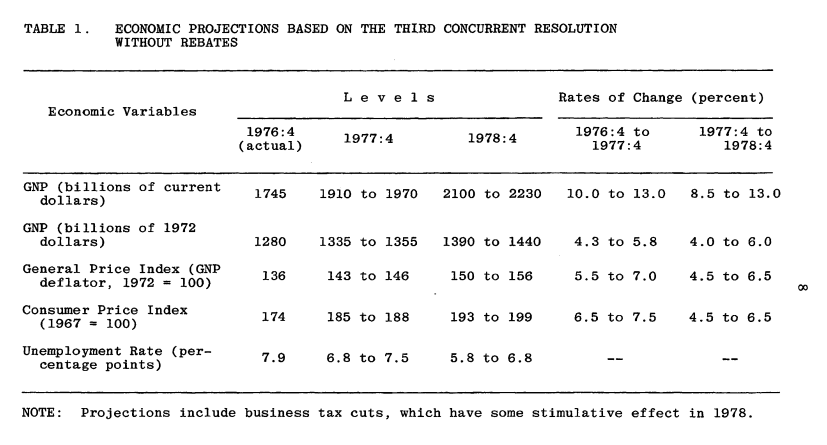
Congressional Budget Office's economic projection with the rebate removed

For the first draft of the bill, the CBO estimated that the impact of President Carter's economic stimulus would contribute an additional $14 billion to the gross national product (GNP) in the first year. In the second year, it would contribute another $18 billion to the country's GNP. When comparing the economy without stimulus in place, the bill would help to add an estimated 1 percent to GNP in its 1977 and 1.3 percent by 1978. The CBO also projected a decrease in unemployment by a decrease in 0.5 percent in 1977 and 0.7 percent in 1978.

When the CBO did a revised forecast to account for the removal of the rebate, the CBO estimated an increase of unemployment rate of 0.2 percent. The increase in unemployment would result in a loss of 280,000 jobs in 1977, while the forecast for unemployment for 1978 remains unchanged.

The CBO also forecast that the government would see a $15.8 billion reduction in tax revenue, with $7.8 billion extending from temporary laws and an additional $7.9 billion that would arise from the stimulus package. Overall, with the added stimulus measures, the Carter administration would see a fiscal budget deficit of $61.8 billion. The actual budget deficit was less than the projected budget of $53 that was announced in 1978.

== Developments under the act and estimates of the act's effects ==
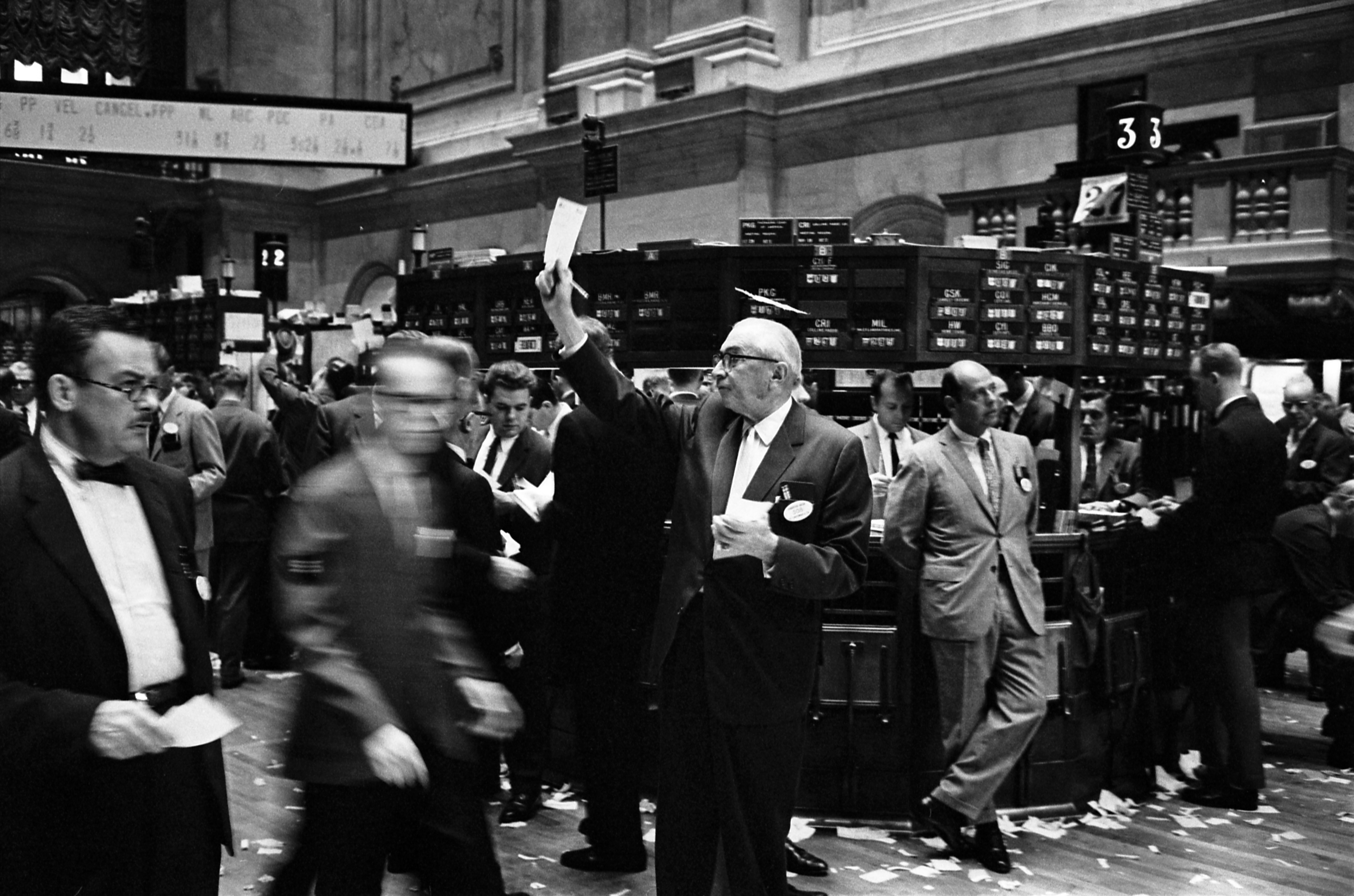
New York Stock Exchange

Carter's advisors initially felt that a two-year economic stimulus program would better help to restore the economy. The original act was priced between $25 billion to $32 billion, claiming that a more comprehensive stimulus plan spread over two years would be more suitable for the economic situation at the time. However, as Carter's aides further examined the situation, a conclusion was made that a one-year program would be more palatable, both economically and in Congress. Schultze presented in front of a congress committee, stating that with the stimulus in place, the country's real GNP would be from 5% to 6% between the fourth quarter of 1976 to 1977. However, without the stimulus, the growth rate would be at a lower 4.5% to 4.75%. He also alluded to the potential of an additional stimulus if growth was not up to projection.

At the State of the Union address in 1981, President Carter announced that the bill had generated 425,000 public service jobs, and the youth employment initiative has helped fund over 200,000 jobs. Additionally, the slots at Job Corps were increased to 44,000 by a total of 100%, and a million summer youth jobs were approved. However, an analysis done by survey firms in 1978 stated that the impact of jobs credits was limited, with many firms were unaware of the existence of such programs. While more than 2.0 million people participated in CETA programs which helped to reduce the unemployment rate, disparities were still present across genders, races and locations. A study revealed that while the unemployment rates among whites declined from 7.8 to 6.4 percent, unemployment among African Americans failed to show any reduction.

A further study done by senior Carter Administration Treasury official Emil Sunley and economist Ned Gramlich stated that the bill had little effect. The bill resulted in heavy inflation that led to the eventual recession in 1980. The period was later known as the time of stagflation, where both inflation and recession occurred at the same time.

The administration's focus on full employment led to the country's eventual problem of inflation. Carter's aides were aware of the inflation problem when they entered office in 1977, but they thought they were able to control it. Carter's aggressive fiscal and monetary policies called for an increase of money supply by the Federal Reserve. This led to a spike in inflation, climbing to 13.3 percent in two years. Even though there was a rise in inflation, unemployment failed to decrease, resulting in a period of high prices and unemployment. It took Paul Volcker, the 12th Federal Reserve chairman, to bring inflation back down with the "Volcker Shock". The strategy implemented, led to the raised interest rates and limiting the country's liquidity to bring down inflation.

== See also ==
- Economic history of the United States
- American Recovery and Reinvestment Act of 2009
- Fiscal policy of the United States
- Humphrey–Hawkins Full Employment Act
