= Thai Khem Khaeng =

Economic program in Thailand

(Thai: ไทยเข้มแข็ง, alternately romanized as Thai Khem Khang, 'Strong Thailand') was a Thai economic stimulus  investment program imposed by the government of Abhisit Vejjajiva in the years 2009 and 2010, led by Finance Minister Korn Chatikavanij. The program consist of two major stimulus packages injected in the Thai economy involving vast investments in industry, science, technology, agriculture, logistics and infrastructure, environment, education, labour and tourism and the positive impact remains in the economy up to the present.

== Historical context ==
Thailand became a great exporter almost 200 years ago, mainly to the Southeast Asia and US. The long history in exporting lead to a state, in which more than 60% of Thailand's Gross Domestic Product (GDP) came from export. In July 1997 a financial collapse of the Thai Baht occurred due to lack of foreign currency to support its currency peg to the U.S. dollar. The collapse caused the country to acquire a burden of foreign debts and the country bankrupted. The consequences of the collapse caused the spread of the 1997 Asian financial crisis.

Thailand was not able to fully recover from the Asian crisis, but the GDP grew annually anyway until the Great Recession. It struck the Thai economy much less than the previous crisis, mostly because the epicenter of the recession was the USA and west Europe, but the consequences could have been much worse if the government had not responded with a good investment plan known as Thai Khem Khaeng which spurred the Thai's economy in final value of 400 billion baht in various markets and industry sectors.

== Thai Khem Kaeng ==
In 2009, Thailand's economy was in a state of unstable and distressful consumption as a consequence of the Great Recession. Due to this global crisis, suppliers and consumers worldwide seriously tightened their belts. First-phase stimulus came in Q1 (First quartal), when the administration of Prime Minister Abhisit Vejjajiva poured 116 billion baht worth of tax breaks, public utility subsidies, and cash incentives for low-income workers into the economy. These measures, referred as SP1 or Stimulus Package 1, helped spur local consumption. Thailand's economy weathered a difficult period and then climbed out of recession in the second half as investment and consumption improved.

Thailand Board of Investment (BOI) nurture along many new projects to invigorate business, with 1 573 project applications submitted in 2009. BOI-approved investment covered a wide spectrum of sectors, from services, transport and industrial estates to electronics, eco-car parts and alternative energy. High-tech businesses engaged in the manufacture of telecommunication parts, semiconductors, HDDs, automotive electronics and many more. On 23 November, the One Start One Stop Investment Center (OSOS) was launched in Bangkok. Its main purpose was to facilitate and speed up the entry of new investors to the markets as well as assist existing businesses to expand within the borders of Thailand and it is a convenient focal point for businesses to ease the dealing with government as their representative up this day. Promotional policies and roadshows conducted during the year helped to bring in FDI. According to a BOI survey made of 576 investors between April and June 2009, none of them aimed to withdraw their investments from Thailand, 30% intend to expand more and the rest wanted to keep projects at current states. Investors also responded that one of the reasons is the attractiveness of the investment incentives, reasonable wages, well-developed infrastructure, and reliable suppliers of materials for the industries, parts and services in the country. The value of investment from China increased tenfold in 2009 and investors from Japan, United States, Europe and ASEAN countries followed. In the third quarter of 2009, the private investment declined by just 12.2% y-o-y, according to the National Economic and Social Development Board (NESDB). That was a huge decrease in comparison with the 17.8 and 16.1% contractions in Q1 and Q2, respectively. With foreign funds flowing back in the second half of 2009 Thailand's stock market rebounded as well. The stock prices index rose by 57.1% from 2 January to 3 December 2009. A breakdown of various sectors in 2009 shows ups and downs but generally forward movement, especially after the first quarter. Consumer confidence firmed up as the year carried on, with this index rising steadily to hit 74.5 in August 2009 and 75.6 in September. Overall demand expanded throughout the whole year. Vehicle purchases in particular increased for the third consecutive month as employment grew livelier. Healthier consumption can also be seen in the agricultural market as the income improved with higher crop prices.

November 2009 is considered a breakpoint month when Thailand recovered from the crisis of past year. Imports in November rose 4.7% from the previous month and contracted just 0.3% y-o-y. Earlier months had double-digit contraction rates. In a move that bodes well for continued growth in consumption, the Central Wage Committee in December increased Thailand's minimum wage. In Bangkok, the new minimum climbed from 203 to 206 baht per day.

As in most countries around the world, the job market in Thailand suffered a heavy blow in 2008. Injections of government funding stirred the activity in 2009 and by the third quarter, mostly service businesses and manufacturers of electronics and textile were hiring more staff. The country's unemployment rate decreased to record-breaking 1.1% in November which was the lowest percentage yet, indicating a comeback in progress, as the unemployment rate was 2.1% in Q1.

November 2009 also brought back Thailand's incomes from tourism. The number of foreign visitors grew throughout the year, and in Q3 the arrivals had almost reached the levels achieved before the financial crisis took place. In November 2009, 1.37 million foreign tourists came to Thailand, up 13.1% from the previous month. The BOI promoted development of tourism clusters in the country, such as theme parks and cultural centers as examples of facilities and with import duties and corporate tax exemptions to prompt investors. Other opportunities for investment in Thailand's tourism infrastructure included property development in major cities, spas, hotels and short-haul air and sea transport. Many tourists traveled to Thailand for its very affordable surgeries.

At the beginning of 2010 a second stimulus package was injected in the economy according to the data gathered through the year 2009. It aimed mostly at Thailand's infrastructure but it could not reach the same impact level as the SP1 had. It is said that the second stimulus package was made partially to increase the popularity of the government at that time. The fact is that the decision making behind it was not as sophisticated as the year before.

== See also ==
- Economy of Thailand

http://www.en.moe.go.th/index.php?option=com_content&view=article&id=898:cabinet-offer-tax-exemption-for-teachers-and-educational-personnel-in-southern-thailand&catid=1:news&Itemid=42
