= Kenya Economic Stimulus Programme =

The Economic Stimulus Programme (ESP) was a spending plan initiated by the Government of Kenya to boost economic growth and lead the Kenyan economy out of the 2007–2008 Kenyan crisis and the Great Recession. It was introduced in the 2009/2010 Budget Speech in parliament by Finance Minister Uhuru Kenyatta. Its aim was to jumpstart the Economy of Kenya towards long term growth and development, after the 2007–2008 Kenyan crisis and post-election violence that affected the Kenyan economy. Other economic problems included prolonged drought, a rally in oil prices and food prices, and the effects of the Great Recession. The stimulus was a response to the decline in the economic growth rate from 7.1% in 2007 to 1.7% in 2009.

The total budget allocated amounted to KSh.22 billion/= (260 million US$), with the money going towards the construction of schools, horticultural markets, jua kali sheds and public health centres in all the 210 constituencies.

== Key Objectives ==
1. Boost the country's economic recovery;

2. Invest in long-term solutions to the challenges of food security

3. Expand economic opportunities in rural areas for employment creation;

4. Promote regional development for equity and social stability;

5. Improve infrastructure and the quality education and healthcare;

6. Invest in the conservation of the environment;

7. Expand the access to, and build the ICT capacity to expand economic opportunities and accelerate economic growth.

== Intervention Measures ==
The choice of intervention measures of the ESP are framed within broader policy objectives, as stipulated in the Vision 2030, (the current national development blue-print. Agenda 4, and the Constitution of Kenya.

Activities covered under the ESP include:

- Expansion of irrigation-based agriculture,
- Construction of wholesale and fresh produce markets,
- Construction and stocking of fishponds with fingerlings,
- Provision of aquaculture advisory services,
- Construction of ‘juakali’ sheds
- Tree planting

== Governance Structure of the Economic Stimulus Programme ==
The ESP is governed by the Ministry of Finance, with the Minister for Finance as the overall leader

Overall Leadership – Deputy Prime Minister & Minister for Finance

Technical Working Group – Chaired by the Permanent Secretary to the Treasury, composed of Senior Treasury Officials in the Ministry of Finance.

ESP Secretariat – Officers from Budget Supplies and Economic Affairs departments

Project Implementation Units – Implementing respective Line Ministries of Health, Public Works, Education and Local Government

Stimulus Project Management Committee (SPMC) – Established by the Constituency Development Fund Committees (CDFC) at the constituency level.

Constituency Projects Tender Committee (CPTC) – Adopted from The District Project Tender Committee

== Projects ==
=== Industrialization ===
This project aims at constructing and equipping one ‘juakali’ shed per constituency. Development is to take place in phases and is envisioned to facilitate participation of youth as artisans and entrepreneurs in massive social infrastructure projects and construction works at constituency level. The project is being led by the Ministry of Industrialization. District industrial development officers are being assisted by field officers from Kenya industrial Estates and Kenya Industrial Research Development Institute to roll out the project at the constituency level.

=== Education ===
This project has various components: • Upgrading of two primary schools per constituency and equipping with water harvesting and underground water storage facilities

• Construction of a secondary school as a center of excellence per constituency

• Additional 10,500 primary school teachers Recruitment on contract

• Additional 2,100 secondary school teachers recruitment on contract terms.

• Tree planting project in 20 schools per constituency.

• Purchase of a mobile digital laboratory per constituency.

The implementing agency is the Ministry of Education Kenya. School management committees are to oversee implementation in primary schools and Board of Governors in secondary schools.

=== Public Health and Sanitation ===
This project aims to roll out a comprehensive programme of healthcare reforms covering infrastructure development, promotion of preventive healthcare and devolved management of facilities.

• Construction and equipping of a health centre in every constituency

• Employment of 20 nurses on contract level per constituency

• Purchase 5 motor cycles and 20 bicycles for community health workers

The ministry of Public Health and Sanitation and KEMSA are lead implementing agencies.

=== Food Production ===
This project aims at increasing availability and accessibility of maize/rice crop and increasing and stabilising the strategic grain reserve through rehabilitation and expansion of irrigable land. Ministry of Agriculture Kenya, Ministry of Water and Irrigation, Ministry of Regional Development and Ministry of Youth Affairs are lead agents in this project.

=== Fisheries ===
The project aims at constructing 200 farming ponds for 140 constituencies. Ponds are to be stocked with appropriate fingerling determined by the various and the needs of the beneficiaries. Training of trainers on fish ponds construction and hatchery management. The Ministry of Fisheries Development is the lead agent.

=== Local Government ===
This projects aim is to support the commercialisation of agricultural produce by increasing the per capita number and access to wholesale and fresh produce markets and increasing efficiency in marketing and trade of agricultural produce. This project is led by the Office of the Deputy Prime Minister and Ministry for Local Government.
