= Economic Stimulus Act of 2008 =

Act of Congress in the United States

The Economic Stimulus Act of 2008 (Pub. L. 110–185 (text) (PDF), 122 Stat. 613, enacted February 13, 2008) was an Act of Congress providing for several kinds of economic stimuli intended to boost the United States economy in 2008 and to avert a recession, or ameliorate economic conditions. The stimulus package was passed by the U.S. House of Representatives on January 29, 2008, and in a slightly different version by the U.S. Senate on February 7, 2008. The Senate version was then approved in the House the same day. It was signed into law on February 13, 2008, by President George W. Bush with the support of both Democratic and Republican lawmakers. The law provides for tax rebates to low- and middle-income U.S. taxpayers, tax incentives to stimulate business investment, and an increase in the limits imposed on mortgages eligible for purchase by government-sponsored enterprises (e.g. Fannie Mae and Freddie Mac). The total cost of this bill was projected at $152 billion for 2008.

== Tax rebates ==
Tax rebates that were created by the law were paid to individual U.S. taxpayers during 2008. Most taxpayers below the income limit received a rebate of at least $300 per person ($600 for married couples filing jointly). Eligible taxpayers received, along with their individual payment, $300 per dependent child under the age of 17. The payment was equal to the payer's net income tax liability, but could not exceed $600 (for a single person) or $1200 (married couple filing jointly). Net liability can be found in these locations:

- Form 1040: line 57 plus line 52
- Form 1040A: Line 35 plus line 32
- Form 1040EZ: line 10

Those with no net tax liability were still eligible to receive a rebate, provided, they met minimum qualifying income of $3,000 per year. Rebates were phased out for taxpayers with adjusted gross incomes greater than $75,000 ($150,000 for couples filing jointly) in 2007. For taxpayers with incomes greater than $75,000, rebates were reduced at a rate of 5% of the income above this limit. Individuals who were claimed as dependents by another taxpayer were not eligible for the rebates.

The $3,000 of qualifying income included earned income (e.g., wages, self-employment income, Social Security), however Supplemental Security Income did not count as qualifying income for the stimulus payment. Also, low-income workers were required to file a return to receive the payment, even if they would not be required to file for income tax purposes.

Some taxpayers who exceeded the income limits, but had qualifying children, still received a rebate. For example, a single parent whose 2007 adjusted gross income was $90,000, paid more than $600 in 2007 taxes and had two qualifying children received a rebate of $450. The IRS added together a $600 rebate for the parent and $600 for the two children to get $1,200, then subtracted the phaseout reduction of $750 ($50 for each $1,000 income above $75,000) to get $450. According to the IRS, the stimulus payment did not reduce taxpayers' 2008 refunds or increase the amount owed when filing 2008 returns.

The payment schedule was based on whether the taxpayer's 2007 tax return listed direct deposit information as well as the last two digits of the social security number of the tax return's main filer, with direct deposits being sent between May 2 and May 16, and paper checks being sent between May 16 and July 11. On April 25, 2008, President Bush announced that the rebates would start going out on April 28, 2008 and the paper checks would be sent out starting on March 28, earlier than previously announced by the IRS.

Taxpayers who used direct deposit for their refunds received the stimulus payment that same way, provided they had not:

- Taken out a refund anticipation loan or "rapid refund";
- Used a service such as TurboTax and had the transmission fees taken out of the refund amount;
- Had their refund deposited across two accounts;
- Allowed their tax preparer (such as a CPA) to deduct their fee from the refund amount.

If any of these scenarios applied, the payment was sent as a paper check through U.S. mail.

== Rationale ==
As 2008 began, economic indicators suggested an increased risk of recession. Federal Reserve Chairman Ben Bernanke testified before Congress that quick action was needed to stimulate the economy through targeted government spending and tax incentives. Congress moved rapidly to pass such legislation. The legislation was designed to stimulate spending by businesses and consumers during 2008. The hope was that the targeted individual tax rebates would boost consumer spending and that targeted tax incentives would boost business spending.

Lawmakers raised the limits on conforming mortgages eligible for government insurance and GSE purchase in response to the subprime mortgage crisis. This crisis had resulted in a widespread credit crunch by late 2007. The credit crunch led to a reluctance by lenders to issue so-called jumbo mortgages for the purchase of houses that exceeded the FHA and GSE limits. The United States housing bubble had pushed house prices above those limits in many areas of the country. As interest rates rose for jumbo mortgages, fewer buyers could afford them, and house prices were being forced down toward the limits for conforming mortgages. By raising those limits, lawmakers hoped to slow or halt the decline in house prices, which threatened the financial well-being of homeowners, banks and other financial entities holding jumbo mortgages.

The FHA loan limits also went up with the stimulus package on March 6. The loan limit package is called "FHA Forward."

== Impact ==
A December 2009 study found that only about one-third of the tax rebate was spent, providing only a modest amount of stimulus.

Another study compared the spending patterns of households that received their stimulus payments early on with the spending of patterns of households who had not yet received their payments. The researchers found that the stimulus checks increased spending for the typical family by 3.5% when the rebate arrived, boosting overall nondurable consumption by 2.4% in the second quarter of 2008. The study concludes that the rebate payments for U.S. households were an effective stimulus method by increasing disposable income despite the predictions of certain economic theories such as the permanent income hypothesis.

== Immigration restrictions ==
Taxpayers who filed their returns jointly were not eligible for payment if any of the persons on the tax return filed with an Individual Taxpayer Identification Number (ITIN) instead of a Social Security Number (SSN). For example, if a family of five had one parent with an ITIN, no money is payable to any member of the family, including US citizens with valid social security numbers. The rule was added after the Federation for American Immigration Reform (FAIR), an anti-immigration organization with ties to white nationalism, lobbied the Senate for the change. The amendment was proposed by Senator John Ensign of Nevada.

As a result, many legal resident aliens and overseas military families did not receive any payment. US citizens who did not receive payments included those who filed a joint tax return for 2007 and included an individual taxpayer identification number, or ITIN, on the document. In this case the entire family was ineligible for the economic stimulus rebate President Bush announced in 2008. At least one million legal residents and tens of thousands of troops were affected by the law, which was designed to keep illegal immigrants from getting stimulus checks.

== See also ==
- American Recovery and Reinvestment Act of 2009
