= Chinese economic stimulus program =

Government Plan

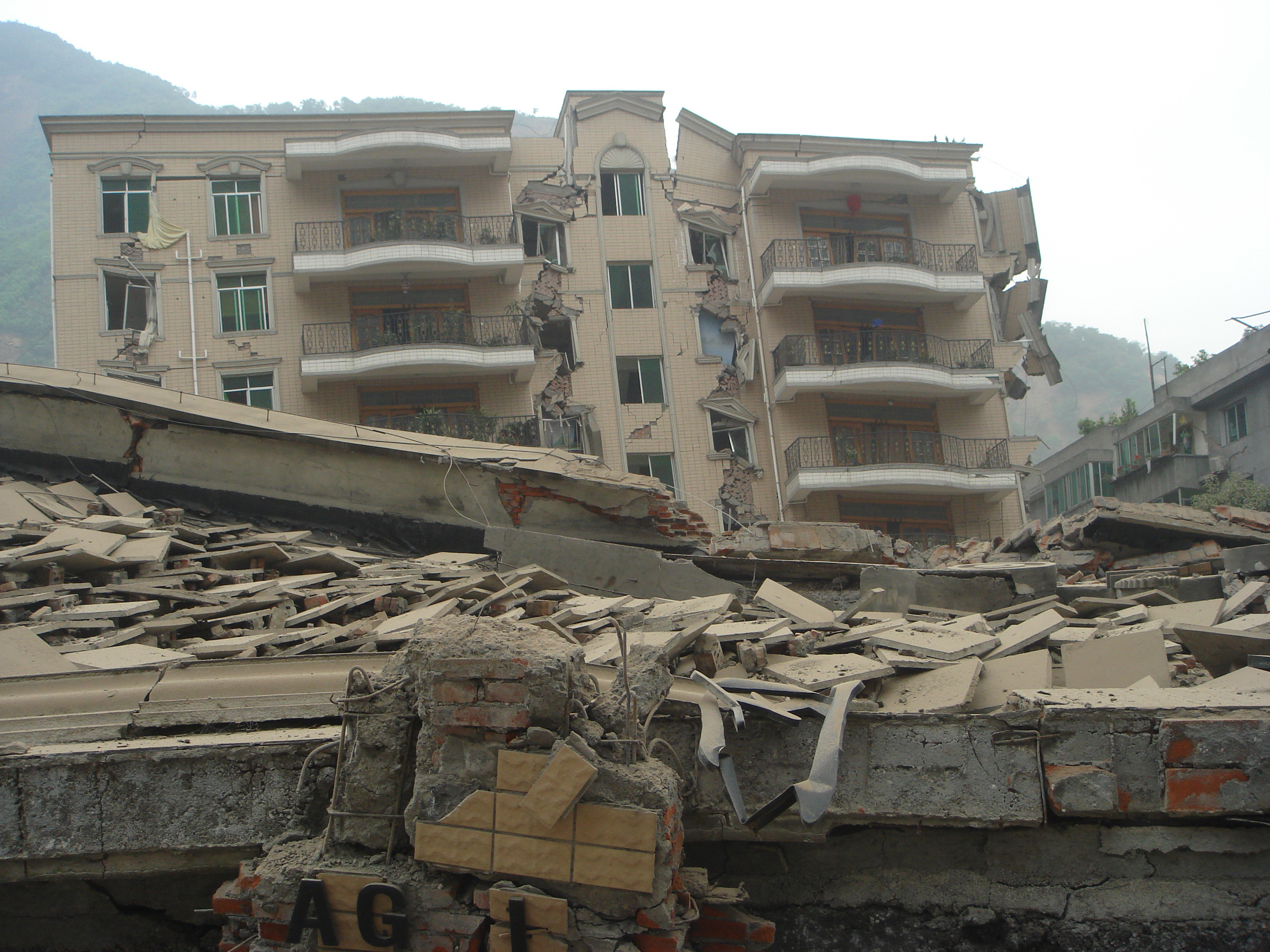
The stimulus includes plans to rebuild areas damaged by the 2008 Sichuan earthquake.

The 2008–09 Chinese economic stimulus plan (simplified Chinese: 扩大内需十项措施; traditional Chinese: 擴大內需十項措施; pinyin: Kuòdà Nèixū Shíxiàng Cuòshī) was a RMB¥ 4 trillion (US$586 billion) stimulus package aiming to minimize the impact of the Great Recession on the economy of China. It was announced by the State Council of the People's Republic of China on 9 November 2008. The economic stimulus plan was seen as a success: While China's economic growth fell to almost 6% by the end of 2008, it had recovered to over 10% by in mid-2009. Critics of China's stimulus package have blamed it for causing a surge in Chinese debt since 2009, particularly among local governments and state-owned enterprises. The World Bank subsequently went on to recommend similar public works spending campaigns to western governments experiencing the effects of the Great Recession, but the US and EU instead decided to pursue long-term policies of quantitative easing.

== Announcement ==
A statement on the government's website said the State Council of the People's Republic of China had approved a plan to invest 4 trillion yuan in infrastructure and social welfare by the end of 2010. This stimulus, equivalent to US$586 billion, represented a pledge comparable to that subsequently announced by the United States, but which came from an economy only one third the size. The stimulus package will be invested in key areas such as housing, rural infrastructure, transportation, health and education, environment, industry, disaster rebuilding, income-building, tax cuts, and finance.

China's export driven economy started to feel the impact of the economic slowdown in the United States and Europe, and the government had already cut key interest rates three times in less than two months in a bid to spur economic expansion.

The stimulus package was welcomed by world leaders and analysts as larger than expected and a sign that by boosting its own economy, China is helping to stabilize the world economy. World Bank President Robert Zoellick declared that he was 'delighted' and believed that China was 'well positioned given its current account surplus and budget position to have fiscal expansion.' News of the announcement of the stimulus package sent markets up across the world.

== Details ==
=== 2008 ===
On the 15 of November, 2008, it was revealed that the central government would only provide 1.2 trillion yuan of funds. The rest of the funds will be reallocated from the budget of provincial and local governments.

Chinese banking officials were reportedly considering establishing a fund worth between 600 billion and 800 billion yuan to purchase domestic shares listed on the Shanghai Stock Exchange, particularly those in the Shanghai Composite, in the event the Shanghai Index fell to 1,500 points.

=== 2009 ===
On March 6, 2009, China's National Development and Reform Commission' announced a revision of the stimulus and published a breakdown of how the funds would be distributed.

Public infrastructure development took up the biggest portion – 1.5 trillion yuan, or nearly 38% of the total package. The projects lined up include railway, road, irrigation, and airport construction.

The second largest allocation – one trillion yuan – went to reconstruction works in regions hit by the 8-magnitude Sichuan earthquake in May 2008; that was followed by funding for social welfare plans, including the construction of low-cost housing, rehabilitation of slums, and other social safety net projects.

Rural development and technology advancement programs shared the same amount of allocation – at 370 billion yuan each. Rural projects in the pipeline included building public amenities, resettling nomads, supporting agriculture works, and providing safe drinking water.

Technology advancement mainly targeted at upgrading the Chinese industrial sector, gearing towards high-end production to move away from the current export-oriented and labor-intensive mode of growth. This was in line with the government's latest blueprint for revitalizing 10 selected industries.

To ensure sustainable development, the Chinese government also allocated some 210 billion yuan, or 5.3% of the stimulus package for promoting energy saving and gas emission cuts, and environmental engineering projects.

Finally, 150 billion yuan was allocated for educational, cultural and family planning purposes.

One year later, these programs seem to have been even more successful than expected, so that on November 4, 2009, the World Bank group enhanced its "prognosis" of the Chinese GDP, by +1.2%, to a value of +8.4%.

=== 2010 ===
China's economic growth was sustained by the economic stimulus and in addition, assisted neighboring countries with the economic recovery in 2010. Chinese real economic growth was around 10 percent even as European and North American economies were slowing. The stimulus provided funds for infrastructure projects and housing developments. Some were used to assist local governments in lending to state-owned enterprises for housing and infrastructure projects. This focus on construction expanded employment in not only construction, but also manufacturing, steel, cement and other sectors producing inputs to the construction sector. Some analysts suggested that the stimulus program could generate inflation and a property bubble.

Due to the success of the economic stimulus plan, the central government tightened financial regulation in order to restrict lending amid fears of a property bubble.

=== 2011 ===
In 2011, it was revealed that as much as 20% of the loans under the program may be written off.

=== 2012 ===
In September 2012, the Chinese government through the National Development and Reform Commission gave approval for 60 infrastructure projects totalling more than 1 trillion yuan ($157 billion).

=== 2024 ===
In September 2024, the Chinese government has planned to issue 2 trillion yuan ($284.43 billion USD) in special sovereign bonds and cut 50 basis points to stimulate the economy. Other stimulus measures include consumer subsidies such as a monthly allowance of 800 yuan ($114 USD) per child to all households with two or more children, excluding the first child.

== Responses ==
The stimulus package has been criticized for causing a surge in Chinese debt after 2009. In 2011, Minxin Pei criticized Beijing for "resorting to massive bank lending to local governments, which then went on an infrastructure spending binge that's certain to haunt the country for years to come". A 2014 study by global think-tank Carnegie Endowment for International Peace blamed China's debt problems on the 4 trillion yuan ($586 billion) stimulus package implemented during the 2008 financial crisis.

Through its allocation of US$32.8 billion for low-carbon infrastructure, industry, and communities, the package helped accelerate the development of eco-cities in China.

The World Bank subsequently went on to recommend similar public works spending campaigns to western governments experiencing the effects of the Great Recession, but the US and EU instead decided to pursue long-term policies of quantitative easing (the buying of trillions of dollars' worth of government bonds or other financial assets in order to stimulate the economy and increase liquidity).

== See also ==
- 2000s energy crisis
- 2008 financial crisis
- 2007–2008 world food price crisis
- 2008–2011 Icelandic financial crisis
- Great Recession in Russia
- Bear Stearns subprime mortgage hedge fund crisis
- Collateralized debt obligation
- Credit derivative
- Derivative (finance)
- Great Recession
- List of entities involved in 2007–2008 financial crises
- Margin call
- Mark-to-market accounting
- Savings and loan crisis
- Statistical Arbitrage: Events of Summer 2007
- Subprime crisis impact timeline
- Subprime mortgage crisis
- United States housing market correction
