= ROC consumer voucher =

Taiwanese economic stimulus (2009, 2020)

The Republic of China Consumer Voucher (Chinese: 中華民國振興經濟消費券) is a type of voucher issued by the government of the Republic of China in times of economic troubles. In 2009, the first series of vouchers was issued in respond to the Great Recession and a second series (known as the Triple Stimulus Vouchers) was issued in 2020 in response to the COVID-19 recession. The second series was issued both as physical vouchers as well as digital e-vouchers.

== 2009 issues ==
The 2009 ROC consumer voucher programme was a part of an economic stimulus package held by the government of the Republic of China. The distribution of the vouchers to every ROC citizen born before 31 March 2009 and some foreign residents (i.e. spouses of citizens) began on 18 January 2009. The purpose of these vouchers was to combat the effects of the Great Recession. According to government officials, the vouchers had to be picked up before 30 April 2009, had to be used before 30 September 2009, and could not be deposited into bank accounts. The overall amount distributed in the form of Consumer Vouchers was $85.8 billion New Taiwan Dollars, roughly around $2.75 billion USD.

Each recipient was entitled to NT$3600, about US$115, the day the vouchers were distributed. Around 91% of the vouchers were issued during the first phase of the distribution. These vouchers could be used to purchase just about any item in Taiwan; however, there were a few notable restrictions. They could not be used to buy lottery tickets or stored-value merchandise, such as prepaid cards.

Based on the premise of a multiplier effect in economics, the ROC Government estimates a growth of 0.66% to 1% in GDP as a result of the increase in domestic demand from the circulation of these vouchers.

== 2020 issues ==
During the 2020 Coronavirus recession the government of the Republic of China as part of its post-epidemic revitalisation of the business climate in the country, as the economy of Taiwan took a major hit from the global pandemic issued a new series of consumer vouchers (振興經濟消費券, "Promoting the economy consumption coupons"). These vouchers were available in two forms, people could register to receive them as physical vouchers which resembled banknotes or as digital vouchers that could be used on the internet tied to electronic payments, e-ticket, credit cards, as well as other digital consumption models.

Initially the Ministry of Economic Affairs sought to only issue them digitally, but then under the pressure of public opinion they also launched these vouchers as paper certificates. These consumer digital vouchers could be used through a website set up by the Republican Chinese government at "https://3000.gov.tw/". In order to incentivise people to choose for the digital vouchers the Ministry of Economic Affairs launched a campaign where users of the digital vouchers could win a Gogoro VIVA Lite. With the winners of the first wave of motor vehicles being drawn from July 6 to July 15 for 10 consecutive days, 1 draw every day, and the second wave of winners would be announced from July 16 to September 31. The campaign would last a total of 15 weeks, and during the second round a winner was to be drawn out of once every week, with a total of 25 motor vehicles available for the draw.

Eligible people could book them from 1 July 2020. By the afternoon of 3 July, over 3 million people had already registered to receive these vouchers. Of these registrations over 70% of the people opted to receive them as paper certificates while only 30% opted for the digital versions.

The Executive Yuan originally estimated that the printing of 3,000,000 copies for the public would obviously be insufficient, and in respond to the large demand for physical vouchers tripled the production and the President of the Executive Yuan of the Republic of China, Su Tseng-chang, responded that the people wouldn't need to worry about delays. Local governments and small businesses reportedly told people to book as early as possible so there would be minimal delay during the rollout.

In December 2020 many shops started offering discounts to people that did not use their voucher yet as they neared their expiration date.

=== Design ===
The 2020 vouchers were offered in two variants, one of 200 New Taiwan dollars and one of 500 New Taiwan dollars. They both featured a map of the Republic of China (island of Taiwan and the other free areas) on the obverse with the denomination as well as the expiration date for final usage using the Chinese republican calendar (使用期限至109年12月31日止). Above the map the text "中華民國 - 興景三倍券" (Republic of China - Revitalisation Triple Ticket) appeared, while both notes contained a notice of the limitations that they cannot be exchanged for cash (不得換現金, bù dé huàn xiàn jīn), no change (不得找零錢, bù děi zhǎo líng qián), no stored value (不得儲值, bù dé chǔ zhí). The vouchers both featured security features and on the right side was the word "TAIWAN" written in Latin script.

The NTD 200 voucher is green in colour, while the NTD 500 variant is red.
