= List of companies of Malawi =

Location of Malawi (in blue)

Malawi, officially the Republic of Malawi, is a landlocked country in southeast Africa that was formerly known as Nyasaland. Malawi is among the world's least-developed and most-densely populated countries. Around 85% of the population live in rural areas. The economy is based on agriculture, and 41% of GDP and 90% of export revenues come from this. In 2006, in response to disastrously low agricultural harvests, Malawi, through an initiative by the late President Bingu Mutharika, an economist by profession, began a program of fertilizer subsidies that were designed to re-energize the land and boost crop production. It has been reported that this program, championed by the country's president, is radically improving Malawi's agriculture, and causing Malawi to become a net exporter of food to nearby countries. Economic grievances though took a downward slide during Mutharikas second term. Economic grivences was a catalyst that resulted in the 2011 economic protests in Malawi in July.

== Notable firms ==
This list includes notable companies with primary headquarters located in the country. The industry and sector follow the Industry Classification Benchmark framework. Organizations which have ceased operations are included and noted as defunct.

Notable companies Status: P=Private, S=State; A=Active, D=Defunct
Name	Industry	Sector	Headquarters	Founded	Notes	Status	
Agricultural Development and Marketing Corporation (ADMARC)	Consumer goods	Farming & fishing	Limbe	1971	State-owned agricultural entity	S	A
Air Malawi	Consumer services	Airlines	Lilongwe	1964	Airline, defunct 2013	P	D
Britam	Insurance	Full line insurance	Blantyre	1959	Insurance	P	A
Capital Radio Malawi	Consumer services	Broadcasting & entertainment	Lilongwe	1999	Radio	P	A
CDH Investment Bank	Financials	Banks	Blantyre	1998	Bank	P	A
Electricity Supply Commission of Malawi	Utilities	Conventional electricity	Blantyre	1998	State-owned power	S	A
FDH Bank	Financials	Banks	Blantyre	2008	Bank	P	A
First Merchant Bank	Financials	Banks	Blantyre	1995	Bank	P	A
Indebank	Financials	Banks	Blantyre	1972	Bank	P	A
Kentam Products Limited	Health care	Pharmaceuticals	Mzuzu	1998	Pharma	P	A
Malawi Broadcasting Corporation	Consumer services	Broadcasting & entertainment	Blantyre	1964	State-run radio	S	A
Malawi Posts Corporation (MPC)	Industrials	Delivery services	Blantyre	1998	Postal service	S	A
Malawi Savings Bank	Financials	Banks	Blantyre	2009	Defunct 2015	P	D
Malawi Stock Exchange	Financials	Investment services	Blantyre	1996	Exchange	P	A
Malawian Airlines	Consumer services	Airlines	Lilongwe	2013	State majority owned airline	S	A
National Bank of Malawi	Financials	Banks	Blantyre	1971	Bank	P	A
NBS Bank	Financials	Banks	Blantyre	1964	Bank	P	A
NICO Holdings	Financials	Full line insurance	Blantyre	1971	Insurance	P	A
Reserve Bank of Malawi	Financials	Banks	Lilongwe	1698	Bank	S	A
Swift Air Malawi	Consumer services	Airlines	Lilongwe	2009	Airline, defunct 2012	P	D
Telekom Networks Malawi	Telecommunications	Fixed line telecommunications	Blantyre	1995	Telecom	P	A

== See also ==
- Economy of Malawi
