= First Capital Bank =

First Capital Bank may refer to one of the following:

- First Capital Bank Botswana Limited
- First Capital Bank Malawi Limited
- First Capital Bank Mozambique
- First Capital Bank Zambia Limited
- First Capital Bank Zimbabwe Limited
- First Capital Bank Group
