= PayChangu =

Malawian fintech company

- Company type: Private
- Industry: FinTech
- Founded: 2021
- Key people: Morgan Tembo (CEO), Nohaata Seven (CTO), Joshua Mwendo (COO)
- Website: paychangu.com

PayChangu is a Malawian fintech company that provides digital payment infrastructure for Malawian merchants and payment service providers across the country. The platform enables users to accept and process payments through multiple channels, including mobile money, bank transfers, and card payments, all through a single API integration.

== History ==
PayChangu was founded in 2021 by Morgan Tembo and Nohaata Seven, is headquartered in Lilongwe, Malawi. In 2024, the company was granted a Payment Service Provider (PSP) license by the Reserve Bank of Malawi, allowing it to operate as a regulated digital payment platform. The company was established with the goal of simplifying digital transactions and expanding access to financial technology in underserved markets.

== Partnerships ==
In 2025, PayChangu partnered with Centenary Bank Malawi, becoming the first payment provider in Malawi to offer an instant bank transfer API for local businesses. The collaboration enabled merchants, including those in the betting industry such as 888bets, to integrate PayChangu's platform and leverage the instant bank transfer functionality for fast and secure transactions.

== Awards and recognitions ==
PayChangu has been recognized as one of the most innovative fintech companies in Malawi. In 2025, the company won the ICT Firm of the Year award at the ICT Association of Malawi (ICTAM) Awards, competing in a category alongside notable organizations such as Airtel Malawi, Telekom Networks Malawi, and National Bank of Malawi.

== See also ==
- Telekom Networks Malawi
- Centenary Bank Malawi
- Economy of Malawi
- Reserve Bank of Malawi
