= Hitesh Anadkat =

Malawi-based businessman

- Born: 1960 (age 65–66); Blantyre, Malawi
- Education: University of London(BSc) Cornell University(MBA)
- Occupation: Businessman

Hitesh Anadkat is a Malawian businessman, investor and philanthropist. He is the founder of the African banking group FMB Capital Holdings.

== Early life and education ==
Anadkat was born in Blantyre, Malawi in 1960 while the country was still a British protectorate to Indian Gujarati parents. His father, NG Anadkat was a prominent businessman in Malawi. Anadkat holds an Economics degree from the University of London and an MBA from Cornell University. He is married to Meeta and has three children. He holds a British passport.

== Career ==
Following his education, Anadkat worked in the United States, eventually starting his own corporate finance firm in Connecticut. He returned to Malawi in 1992 and successfully applied for the country's first private banking licence in 1994, which was unexpected as the financial sector had been closed and largely state-controlled until that point.

He founded First Capital Bank (initially known as First Merchant Bank) in 1995. The bank expanded into Botswana in 2008 and subsequently into Mozambique and Zambia in 2013. In 2017, it purchased a majority-stake in Barclays Bank of Zimbabwe. FMB Capital Holdings is a Mauritian entity that serves as a holding company for First Capital's operations. Its shares trade on the Malawi Stock Exchange as FMBCH. In 2023, it had assets of $1.5 billion. Anadkat remains its principal shareholder, and serves as a non-executive board member of FMB Capital and its subsidiaries.

In 2007, Anadkat entered into a consortium with Press Corporation and Old Mutual that took over Malawi's main telecoms provider TNM. Anadkat owned a significant stake in the company and served as its Vice Chairman until 2021.

He is the largest private shareholder of Letshego, an African financial services conglomerate. His other interests include tobacco, manufacturing and a real estate portfolio which includes the Livingstone Towers in Blantyre and Chief M’Mbelwa Building in Malawi's capital city, Lilongwe.

== Philanthropy ==
Anadkat has been noted for his large philanthropic contribution to Malawi. His projects have primarily been in the health, education and prison reform sectors. Among his notable donations are the Anadkat-Wellcome Trust Trauma Centre and the Anadkat Centre for Children's Emergencies at Malawi's largest hospital, Queen Elizabeth Central Hospital and the Anadkat Halls of Residence at the University of Malawi College of Medicine.

Anadkat has publicly decried prison conditions and congestion in Malawi and faulted magistrates for giving disproportionately large sentences for minor offences. In 2020, he constructed the largest prison block in the Malawi Prison Service at the Chichiri Prison in Blantyre and created a legal committee to process the bail applications of hundreds of minor offenders.
