= Prime Bank (Kenya) =

Commercial bank in Kenya

Prime Bank Kenya Limited
- Type: Private company
- Industry: Financial services
- Founded: 3 September 1992; 33 years ago
- Headquarters: Nairobi, Kenya
- Key people: R.C. Kantaria (chairman), Bharat Jani (managing director)
- Products: Loans, transaction accounts, savings, internet banking, mobile banking, investments, debit cards
- Revenue: ▲ Aftertax:KES:2.122 billion (US$21.335 million) (2017)
- Total assets: KES:77.998 billion (US$784.215 million) (2017)
- Website: www.primebank.co.ke

Prime Bank Kenya (PBKL) is a commercial bank in Kenya, licensed and supervised by the Central Bank of Kenya (CBK), the national banking regulator.

The bank is a mid-sized retail bank that caters to both individuals and corporate clients. As of December 2017, the bank's total asset base was valued at KES:77.998 billion (US$784.215 million), with shareholders' equity of KES:14.672 billion (US$147.518 million).

As at July 2018, Prime Bank was the 15th largest commercial bank in Kenya, out of a total of 39 lenders, based on total assets. At that time, the bank had 24,000 deposit accounts and 4,000 loan accounts, with a market share of 1.82 percent, according to data provided by CBK.

== Subsidiaries ==
The bank's investments include:

- Prime Capital & Credit Limited (PCCL) – based in Nairobi, 100% owned by Prime Bank (Kenya)
- Tausi Assurance Company Ltd – 80.72% shareholding, an insurance company based in Kenya
- FMBCapital Holdings Plc – 22.48% shareholding, 11.24% is held directly while 11.24% is held through PCCL, a Mauritius-based financial services holding company with subsidiaries in Botswana, Malawi, Mozambique, Zambia and Zimbabwe

== Branch network ==
As of January 2022, the bank maintains a network of 23 interconnected branches and over 18 ATMs in Kenya's major urban centers.

== Ownership ==
The stock of the bank is privately held. As of January 2019, the bank's stock was owned by the following corporate entities and individuals:

Prime Bank Kenya stock ownership
| Rank | Name of owner | Percentage ownership |
|---|---|---|
| 1 | AfricInvest and Catalyst principal partners | 24.20 |
| 2 | Other investors | 21.34 |
| 3 | Prime Capital Limited | 14.36 |
| 4 | Jamson Limited | 8.02 |
| 5 | Crason Limited | 8.02 |
| 6 | Nason Limited | 8.02 |
| 7 | Prime trustees | 8.02 |
| 8 | Capital nominees | 8.02 |
| | Total | 100.00 |

== See also ==
- List of banks in Kenya
- Central Bank of Kenya
- Economy of Kenya
