= New Finance Bank =

Malawian commercial bank

New Finance Bank Limited
- Company type: Private company
- Industry: Financial services
- Founded: July 24, 2014 (age 11)
- Headquarters: Lilongwe, Malawi
- Key people: Francis Pelekamoyo; Chairman; Zandie Shaba; Managing Director
- Products: Loans, Transaction accounts, Savings, Investments, Debit cards
- Revenue: ▲:Aftertax:
- Number of employees: 96 (2017)
- Website: Homepage

New Finance Bank (NFB), whose complete name is New Finance Bank Malawi Limited is a commercial bank in Malawi. It is one of the commercial banks licensed by the Reserve Bank of Malawi, the central bank and national banking regulator.

== Location ==
The bank's headquarters and main branch are located in Mwai House, at 13/112 Independence Drive, in the central business district of the city of Lilongwe, the capital and administrative headquarters of Malawi. The geographical coordinates of New Finance Bank headquarters are: 13°57'45.2"S, 33°47'47.3"E (Latitude:-13.962500; Longitude:33.796389).

== Overview ==
The bank received a banking licence from the Reserve Bank of Malawi on 13 May 2014 and began commercial transactions on 24 July 2014. New Finance Bank Malawi Limited has one subsidiary, NFB Forex Bureau, where it maintains 100 percent ownership. The bank serves all members of society, with special focus on those who are financially under-served.

== Branches ==
As of April 2018, New Finance Bank maintained six networked branches and eleven automated teller machines, including at the following locations:

1. Lilongwe Old Town Branch: CIL House, Lilongwe
2. Lilongwe City Centre Branch: Mwai House, Independence Drive, City Centre, Lilongwe (Main Branch)
3. Gateway Mall Branch: Gateway Mall, City Centre, Lilongwe
4. Blantyre Branch: Median House, Opposite Malawi Stock Exchange, Victoria Avenue, Blantyre
5. Limbe Branch: City Plaza Building, Limbe
6. Dzaleka Branch: Dzaleka Refugee Camp, Dowa
- Note: Dzaleka Refugee Camp is located about 9 kilometres (6 mi), west of Dowa, in Dowa District, in the Central Region of Malawi.

== Ownership ==
As of April 2018, the stock of the bank, was owned by the following entities:

New Finance Bank Stock Ownership
Rank	Name of Owner	Percentage Ownership
1	MyBucks of Luxembourg	50.0
2	Finsbury Investment of Scotland	50.0
	Total	100.00

== See also ==
- List of banks in Malawi
- Reserve Bank of Malawi
- Economy of Malawi
