= Phillip Madinga =

Malawian businessman

- Born: 8 December 1971 (age 54)
- Occupation: Chief Executive Officer
- Years active: 2021-present
- Employer: Standard Bank Malawi

Phillip Madinga is the managing director and chief executive officer for Standard Bank Malawi Limited. He was appointed to the role of chief executive officer on 1 January 2021.

== Education ==
He studied for his bachelor's degree in economics at the University of Malawi Chancellor College, and acquired both his Bachelor of Business Administration and Master of Business Administration at Stellenbosch University.

== Career ==
On 10 February 2016 Phillip was appointed as First Merchant Bank General manager and in 2017 he was appointed Head of corporate and Investment banking at NBS Bank. Phillip also served as chairperson of the Sunbird Tourism and Commissioner for the National Planning Commission.
