= George Partridge (Malawian politician) =

Malawian politician

Governor of the Reserve Bank of Malawi
- Incumbent
- Assumed office 23 January 2026
- President: Peter Mutharika
- Preceded by: MacDonald Mafuta Mwale

Minister of Industrialisation, Business, Trade and Tourism
- In office 16 October 2025 – 23 January 2026
- President: Peter Mutharika
- Preceded by: Vitumbiko Mumba; Vera Kamtukule
- Succeeded by: Simon Itaye

Personal details
- Born: 22 May 1963 (age 63)
- Party: Democratic Progressive Party
- Education: University of Malawi
- Occupation: Politician; Business executive
- Known for: Former Chief Executive Officer of Press Corporation Limited

George Partridge is a Malawian economist, politician and business executive who has served as Governor of the Reserve Bank of Malawi since 23 January 2026. He previously served as Minister of Industrialisation, Business, Trade and Tourism, having been appointed by President Peter Mutharika on 16 October 2025.

Before his appointment, Partridge held several senior positions in the private sector, including serving as the Chief Executive Officer of Press Corporation Limited.

== Career ==
In October 2025, Partridge undertook his first official foreign assignment after joining the cabinet, when President Peter Mutharika delegated him to represent Malawi at the International Trade and Investment Conference in Doha, Qatar, held from 3 to 5 November 2025. The meeting focused on promoting industrial growth and investment partnerships, and Partridge was expected to engage with investors and policymakers from Asia, the Middle East and Africa.

In January 2026, Partridge was appointed Governor of the Reserve Bank of Malawi by President Mutharika, succeeding MacDonald Mafuta Mwale. His appointment took effect immediately upon announcement by the Chief Secretary to the Government Justin Sadack Saidi.
