= Standard Bank Malawi =

Commercial bank in Malawi

Coordinates: 13°57′42″S 33°47′32″E

Standard Bank of Malawi Limited
- Type: Public
- Traded as: MSE:STANDARD
- Industry: Financial services
- Founded: March 15, 1969; 57 years ago
- Headquarters: Standard Bank Centre, African Unity Road, Lilongwe 3, Malawi
- Key people: Vacant; Chairperson; Phillip Madinga; Chief Executive Officer
- Products: Loans, Savings, Checking, Investments, Debit cards, Credit cards, Mortgages
- Revenue: ▲:Aftertax: MWK:15.9 billion (US$22 million) (2019)
- Total assets: MWK:375.26 billion (US$519 million) (2019)
- Number of employees: 885 (2016)
- Parent: Standard Bank
- Website: www.standardbank.co.mw

The Standard Bank of Malawi, previously known as the Commercial Bank of Malawi, is a commercial bank in Malawi. It is licensed by the Reserve Bank of Malawi, the central bank and national banking regulator.

== Location ==
The headquarters of Standard Bank Malawi are located in the Standard Bank Centre, African Unity Avenue, Lilongwe 3, in Malawi's capital city.

== Overview ==
Standard Bank Malawi is a large financial services provider, serving the banking needs of large companies, small and medium enterprises, as well as individuals. As of December 2019, the bank's total assets were valued at MWK:375.26 billion (US$519 million), with shareholders' equity of MWK:87.24 billion (US$121 million).

== History ==
The bank was established in Malawi on 15 March 1969, as Commercial Bank of Malawi. The founding shareholders were (a) the government of Malawi (b) Press Holdings Limited and (c) Banco Pinto & Sotto Mayor. By the mid 1980s, the bank became a wholly Malawian enterprise, with shareholders being (a) Malawian Development Corporation (20 percent) (b) Press Holdings (40 percent) (c) Government of Malawi (30 percent) and (d) Admarc (10 percent). In 1998, the government of Malawi sold its 30 percent shareholding by floating the bank's stock on the Malawi Stock Exchange (MSE).

In 2001, Standard Bank, a large South African financial services conglomerate, acquired 60 percent shareholding in Commercial Bank of Malawi (CBM). Initially the name of the bank changed to Stanbic Bank Malawi and on 1 June 2007 to Standard Bank Malawi.

In 2023, the bank funded the poet Phindu Zaie Banda to perform her poem NTHOWA as part of an advertising campaign highlighting Malawi's progress and investment. and on the 60th anniversary of Independence in 2024, Banda was among four poets the bank had performing live via Facebook. The other three were Q Malewezi, Nyamalikiti Nthiwatiwa and Wanga.

== Ownership ==
The shares of stock of Standard Bank Malawi are listed on the Malawi Stock Exchange where they trade under the symbol STANDARD. As of 31 December 2018, the major shareholders in the bank were as listed in the table below.

Standard Bank Malawi Stock Ownership
Rank	Name of Owner	Percentage Ownership
1	Standard Bank Group	54.70
2	Public	18.85
3	NICO Holdings Limited	18.20
4	Old Mutual Life Assurance Company Limited	4.89
5	Press Trust	2.11
6	Magetsi Pension Fund	1.25
	Total	100.00

== Branches ==
As of May 2020, the bank maintained networked branches at the following locations.

Standard Bank Malawi Branch List
Rank	Branch Name	Branch Code	Location
1	Blantyre Branch	1005	Blantyre
2	Capital City Branch	1015	Lilongwe 3
3	Limbe Branch	1004	Limbe
4	Ginery Corner Branch	1005	Blantyre 3
5	Zomba Branch	1006	Zomba
6	Mangochi Branch	1008	Mangochi
7	Balaka Branch	1009	Balaka
8	Luchenza Branch	1010	Luchenza
9	Ntcheu Branch	1011	Ntcheu
10	Mwanza Branch	1013	Mwanza
11	Dedza Branch	1014	Dedza
12	Lilongwe Branch	1016	Lilongwe
13	Salima Branch	1017	Salima
14	Kasungu Branch	1018	Kasungu
15	Dwangwa Branch	1019	Dwangwa
16	Mzuzu Branch	1021	Mzuzu
17	Mzuzu Digital Branch	1033	Mzuzu
18	Mzimba Branch	1022	Mzimba
19	Chichiri Branch	1024	Chichiri, Malawi
20	Mponela Branch	1030	Mponela
21	CBC Branch	1025	Blantyre
22	Kanengo Branch	1026	Kanengo
23	City Mall Branch	1031	Lilongwe
24	Karonga Branch	1037	Karonga
25	Nchalo Branch	1029	Nchalo
26	Bwaila Branch	1028	Bwaila
27	Gateway Mall Digital Branch	1032	Lilongwe
27	Total		

== Governance ==
The chairman of the ten-person Board of Directors was Christopher Kapanga until his death on August 8, 2025. The managing director and CEO is Phillip Madinga.

== See also ==
- Standard Bank Group
- Stanbic Bank
- List of banks in Malawi
