= Indebank =

Malawi bank

- Company type: Private
- Industry: Financial services
- Founded: 1972
- Headquarters: Indebank House; Blantyre, Malawi
- Key people: Managing Director
- Products: Loans, Checking, Savings, Investments, Debit Cards
- Revenue: ▲:Pretax:US$2.8 million (MWK:455+ million) (2010)
- Total assets: US$79 million (MWK:12.8 billion) (2010)
- Website: Homepage

Indebank was a commercial bank in Malawi. It derived its name from Investment and Development Bank of Malawi Limited, the original name at the time of its founding. Indebank is one of the commercial banks licensed by the Reserve Bank of Malawi, the national banking regulator.

Indebank ceased to operate on 30 April 2016 and its operating assets and liabilities were acquired by National Bank of Malawi effective 1 May 2016. Indebank's banking licence was consequently surrendered to the central bank.

== Overview ==
The bank was a medium-sized financial services provider in Malawi. As of December 2010, the bank's total assets were valued at approximately US$79 million (MWK:12.8 billion), with shareholders' equity of approximately US$13.1 million (MWK:2.1 billion). The Malawian Government was the largest shareholder in the bank. Indebank maintains three subsidiaries:

1. Indetrust Holdings Limited: 51% shareholding - Real estate leasing
2. Indetrust Limited: 100% shareholding - Pension fund manager
3. Indebank Financial Services Limited: 100% shareholding - Currently dormant

== History ==
Indebank was established in 1972. In the beginning, the institution was a development bank. In 2001, Indebank transformed into a commercial bank following the issuance of a commercial banking license. In June 2010, TransAfrica Holdings Limited, a private equity firm based in Mauritius divested its 41.38% shareholding in Indebank. That ownership interest was acquired by the Government of Malawi at an undisclosed sales price. The government had indicated its desire to sell its interest in Indebank at an IPO on the Malawi Stock Exchange in the future.

== Ownership ==
The bank's stock was owned by the following corporate entities:

Indebank Stock Ownership
Rank	Name of Owner	Percentage Ownership
1	Government of Malawi	41.38
2	Press Trust of Malawi	30.00
3	Admarc Investments Limited of Malawi	25.67
4	Indebank Employee Investment Plan	02.95
	Total	100.00

== Branch network ==
The bank maintained nine (9) branches, five (5) of which, are full service branches in the metropolitan areas of Blantyre, the business capital and of Lilongwe, the political capital of Malawi. The remaining four (4) agency branches are located in the towns of Mponela, Salima, Luchenza and Karonga.

== See also ==
- List of banks in Malawi
- Reserve Bank of Malawi
- Economy of Malawi
