= FDH Bank =

Malawian commercial bank

FDH Bank Limited
- Company type: Private company
- Industry: Financial services
- Founded: July 15, 2008; 17 years ago
- Headquarters: Blantyre, Malawi
- Key people: Charity Mseka, Chairperson; George Chitera, CEO
- Products: Loans, Transaction accounts, Savings, Investments, Debit Cards
- Revenue: ▲Aftertax:MWK:11.43 billion (US$15.9 million) (2019)
- Total assets: MWK:218.2 billion (US$303 million) (2019)
- Number of employees: 1,000+ (2023)
- Website: www.fdh.co.mw/fdhbankplc

FDH Bank, also FDH Bank Limited, is a commercial bank in Malawi. It is one of the commercial banks licensed by the Reserve Bank of Malawi, the central bank and national banking regulator.

== Location ==
The headquarters and main branch of FDH Bank Limited are located on the First Floor of Umoyo House, at 8 Victoria Avenue North, in the city of Blantyre, the financial capital of Malawi. The geographical coordinates of the headquarters of FDH Bank Limited are: 15°47'08.5"S, 35°00'18.5"E (Latitude:-15.785694; Longitude:35.005139).

== Overview ==
As of 31 December 2019, the total assets of FDH Financial Holdings, the holding company of the bank, were valued at MWK:218.2 billion (approx. US$303 million), with shareholders' equity valued at MWK:22.4 billion (approx. US$31.1 million).

== History ==
The bank was founded in 2008, as a subsidiary of FDH Financial Holdings Limited (FDHFHL), a financial holding group, formed in 2007 to replace First Discount House Limited (FDH).

In July 2015, FDH Financial Holdings Limited successfully acquired 75 percent ownership of Malawi Savings Bank, together with its subsidiary MSB Forex Bureau Limited. In July 2016, FDH Financial Holdings Limited completed the merger of FDH Bank Limited and Malawi Savings Bank Limited (MSB). The merged bank adopted the name FDH Bank Limited. The merger of the two banks culminated in the merger of FDH Money Bureau Limited and MSB Forex Bureau Limited. The merged entity adopted the name FDH Money Bureau Limited.

== Ownership ==
As of April 2017, the stock of FDH Bank Limited, was owned by FDH Financial Holdings Limited of Malawi (75 percent) and the Government of Malawi (25 percent). Subsequently FDH Financial Holdings Limited acquired 100 percent ownership of the bank. In June 2020, Malawian print media reported that the stock of FDH Bank would list on the Malawi Stock Exchange, in August 2020.

The table below, represents the shareholding in the stock of the holding company, FDH Financial Holdings Limited.

FDH Financial Holdings Limited Stock Ownership
Rank	Name of Owner	Percentage Ownership
1	M Development Limited (MDL) of Malawi	55.0
2	Old Mutual of Malawi	40.0
3	FDH Employee Stock Ownership Plan	5.0
	Total	100.00

== Branches ==
As of June 2018, FDH Bank maintained a total of 53 networked branches, and 91 automated teller machines, in all 27 districts of the country.

== Governance ==
Arthur Oginga, a non-executive board member, serves as the Chairman of the eleven-person board of directors. Ellias Ngalande, serves as the chief executive officer of FDH Bank Limited.

== See also ==
- List of banks in Malawi
- Reserve Bank of Malawi
- Economy of Malawi
