= Black Missionaries =

Malawian band

Black Missionaries are a popular reggae band from Malawi.

The band is primarily active in the city of Blantyre, and members reside in Chileka. The band originally had five members, namely Evison Matafale, Peter Amidu, and three of the seven sons of Robert Fumulani: Musamude, Anjilu, and Chizondi. Currently only three of the founding members are living, after the leader and founder Evison Matafale was killed whilst in police custody on November 7, 2001. Musamude Fumulani died on 17 September 2007 of TB.

Black Missionaries have released ten albums, Kuimba III - XIII, and perform in concerts across the country, often singing about love and Rastafari issues.

Matafale and The Black Missionaries were coming from the Chiwembe where they had a live show and they were to go to their home land Singano Village (Chileka) but on their way they encountered a road block for Malawi police.

== See also ==
- Chiwembe – village in their song Police Hunt Matafale
