= Centenary Bank =

Commercial bank in Uganda

Coordinates: 00°18′52″N 32°34′41″E

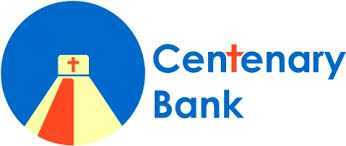
- Type: Private: subsidiary of Centenary Group
- Industry: Financial services
- Founded: 1 January 1983; 43 years ago
- Headquarters: Mapeera House; 44-46 Kampala Road; Kampala, Uganda
- Key people: Bwoch Gustavio Orach Lujwero (Chairman); Fabian Kasi (Managing Director)
- Products: Loans, checking, savings, investments, debit cards
- Revenue: ▲Aftertax: USh342.3 billion (US$94 million (2024)
- Total assets: USh7.11 trillion (US$1.95 billion) (2024)
- Number of employees: 2,792 (2018)
- Website: Centenarybank.co.ug

Centenary Bank, also Centenary Rural Development Bank Limited (CRDBL), is a commercial bank in Uganda licensed by the Bank of Uganda, the central bank and national banking regulator.

== History ==
The bank was founded in 1983 as a credit trust, Centenary Rural Development Trust (CRDT), by Simeon Lutaakome, Hugh Francis Pulle, Paul Kateregga, Vincent Kirabo kya Maria, Emmanuel Mpande, and John Ogutu. In 1985, CRDT began to provide financial services to the public. The bank became a fully licensed commercial bank in 1993, after receiving a license from the Bank of Uganda. As of May 2016, Centenary Bank was the largest majority indigenous Ugandan commercial bank.

In May 2009, John Giles left the seat of Managing Director after three years at the position.The current Managing Director is Fabian Kasi In 2011, the Centenary Bank launched a program with the World Bank Group to develop loans in the Ugandan agricultural sector.

In 2017, Centenary launched on a new core banking platform developed by the Greek company Intrasoft International S.A. and signed a partnership with Mastercard to develop a broad suite of new mobile banking solutions. In December 2017, the Centenary Bank signed a deal with WorldRemit to allow transfer from the remittance service. In May 2020, the bank launched instant paperless accounts for the unbanked Ugandan population.

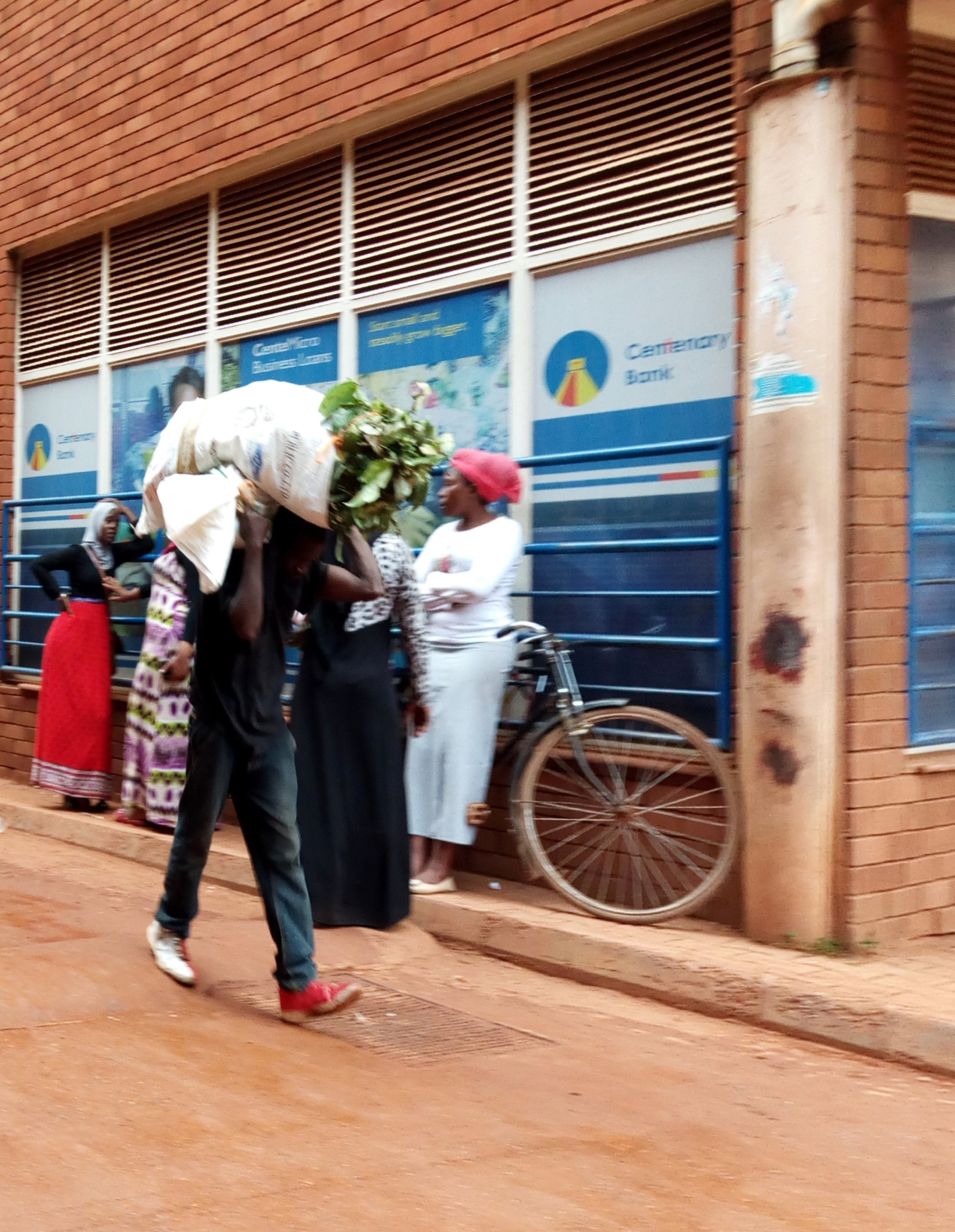
Man passing by a Centenary Bank branch

In March 2023, Centenary Rural Development Bank acquired MyBucks Bank Malawi, hence becoming Centenary Bank Malawi, with over eight branches in the country.

== Overview ==
The bank is a large financial services provider in Uganda primarily involved in the promotion of development through loans to rural farmers, processors of agricultural produce, small traders, small manufacturers, importers, and exporters. While engaged in all areas of commercial banking, the bank has a significant portion of its portfolio in the microfinance arena in an attempt to meet the needs of the many individuals and business entities with limited means. As of December 2021, the bank's assets were UGX:4.8 trillion (US$1.359 billion), with shareholders' equity of USh789.52 billion (US$222.78 million). As of 31 December 2024, the bank's total assets had increased to USh 7.11 trillion (US$1.952 billion).

As of December 2017, Centenary Bank had its headquarters in Kampala. Its headquarters building is Mapeera House, on Kampala Road opposite City Square. The bank had a network of 81 bank branches together with 157 linked automated teller machines at 115 locations in the Central, Western, Northern, and Eastern Regions. The bank had 1,493,554 deposit accounts.

== Partnerships ==
In December 2021, Centenary Bank unveiled a Cente Platinum Mastercard, a debit card for its premium customers.

== Centenary Group ==
Centenary Bank is a component of the Centenary Group of companies. The multinational conglomerate comprises:

- Centenary Bank Uganda Limited, a large commercial bank in Uganda
- Centenary Technology Services Limited (Cente-Tech), an information and communications company, responsible for the ICT functions within the group.
- Centenary Foundation, a non-government non-profit organisation, charged with promoting and executing the group's social programs.
- Centenary Bank Malawi. A commercial bank in Malawi, majority owned by the Centenary Group of Uganda with minority shareholding by the Roman Catholic Archdiocese of Lilongwe.

== Ownership ==
As of December 2021, the bank's stock was privately owned by the following corporate entities and individuals:

Centenary Bank stock ownership
| Rank | Name of owner | Percentage ownership |
|---|---|---|
| 1 | Roman Catholic Dioceses of Uganda | 41.0 |
| 2 | Uganda Roman Catholic Secretariat | 31.7 |
| 3 | Solidarité Internationale pour le Développement et l'Investissement, a French investment bank | 10.5 |
| 4 | Triodos Sicav II–Triodos Microfinance Fund, a wholly owned subsidiary of Triodos Bank | 7.5 |
| 5 | Triodos Custody BV, a wholly owned subsidiary of Triodos Bank | 7.5 |
| 6 | Four Ugandan individuals | 1.8 |
| | Total | 100.00 |

== See also ==
- Banking in Uganda
- List of banks in Uganda
- List of tallest buildings in Kampala
- Asset allocation among commercial banks in Uganda
- Mapeera House
