= List of airlines of Malawi =

This is a list of airlines currently operating in Malawi.

Airline	Image	IATA	ICAO	Callsign	Commenced operations	Notes
Malawian Airlines		3W	MLI	MALAWIAN	2013	Flag carrier
Paladin Energy Airlines					1998	
FlyNyasa			NYS	NYASA	2011	Formerly known as Ulendo Airlink

== See also ==
- List of airlines
- List of defunct airlines of Malawi
- List of companies based in Malawi
