= List of defunct airlines of Malawi =

This is a list of now defunct airlines from Malawi.

Airline	Image	IATA	ICAO	Callsign	Commenced operations	Ceased operations	Notes
Africa Cargo Airlines					1994	1996	Operated Antonov An-32
Air Malawi		QM	AML	MALAWI	1964	2013	
Blue Line Charters					1992	1996	
Capital Air Services					1978	1979	
Leopard Air					1966	1967	Operated Cessna 150, Cessna 175, Cessna 182, Tiger Moth, Piper Cherokee
Malawi Express			MLX		2000	2003	Operated Antonov An-12, Yak-42
Malawian Airlines		3W	MWI		2014	2016	Renamed to Malawi Airlines. Operated Boeing 737-800, Bombardier Q400
Spearhead Air Charter					1978	1979	
Swift Air Malawi					2011	2012	

== See also ==
- List of airlines of Malawi
- List of airports in Malawi
