= Francis Perekamoya =

Governor of the Reserve Bank of Malawi

Francis Perekamoyo

Governor of the Reserve Bank of Malawi
- In office 1992–1995
- Preceded by: Hans Joachim Lesshafft
- Succeeded by: Mathews Chikaonda

Personal details
- Born: 24 October 1947 Nyasaland

Francis Perekamoyo (24 October 1947) is a Malawian economist who served as the governor of the Reserve Bank of Malawi from 1992 to 1995. Pelekamoya was Chairman of New Finance Bank .
