= Malawi Savings Bank =

Bank of Malawi

Malawi Savings Bank (MSB) was a commercial bank in Malawi. It was licensed as a commercial bank by the Reserve Bank of Malawi, the central bank and national banking regulator. Prior to 2015 MSB was a wholly owned parastatal company. MSB was acquired by FDH Bank on 3 July 2016.

== History ==
In 2013, following MSB's inability to meet liquidity requirements, both the International Monetary Fund and the World Bank recommended that the financial institution be sold. The Reserve Bank of Malawi, in its 2014 report, said that MSB needed US$48 million in new capital by June 2015 to avoid it being de-licensed by the central bank.

When the Public Private Partnership Commission advertised for a strategic investor to buy a controlling stake in MSB, FDH Bank, the only bidder, offered US$12 million for a 75 percent stake. The Malawian parliament and civil society organisations protested the then proposed sale. On 3 July 2015, the government sold 75 percent of MSB’s shares of stock to FDH Bank for US$21.1 million.

== Merger ==
In 2016, FDH Financial Holdings Limited, the parent company of FDH Bank, began the process of merging the two institutions, with the retrenchment of some of the employees.

The new owners integrated the operations of MSB with those of FDH Bank. During the process, FDH Money Bureau Limited, became a 100 percent subsidiary of FDH Financial Holdings Limited. As of April 2017, the government of Malawi owned 25 percent of FDH Bank Limited while FDH Financial Holdings Limited owned the remaining 75 percent.

== See also ==
- List of banks in Malawi
- Reserve Bank of Malawi
- Economy of Malawi
