= Mapeera House =

Commercial building in Uganda

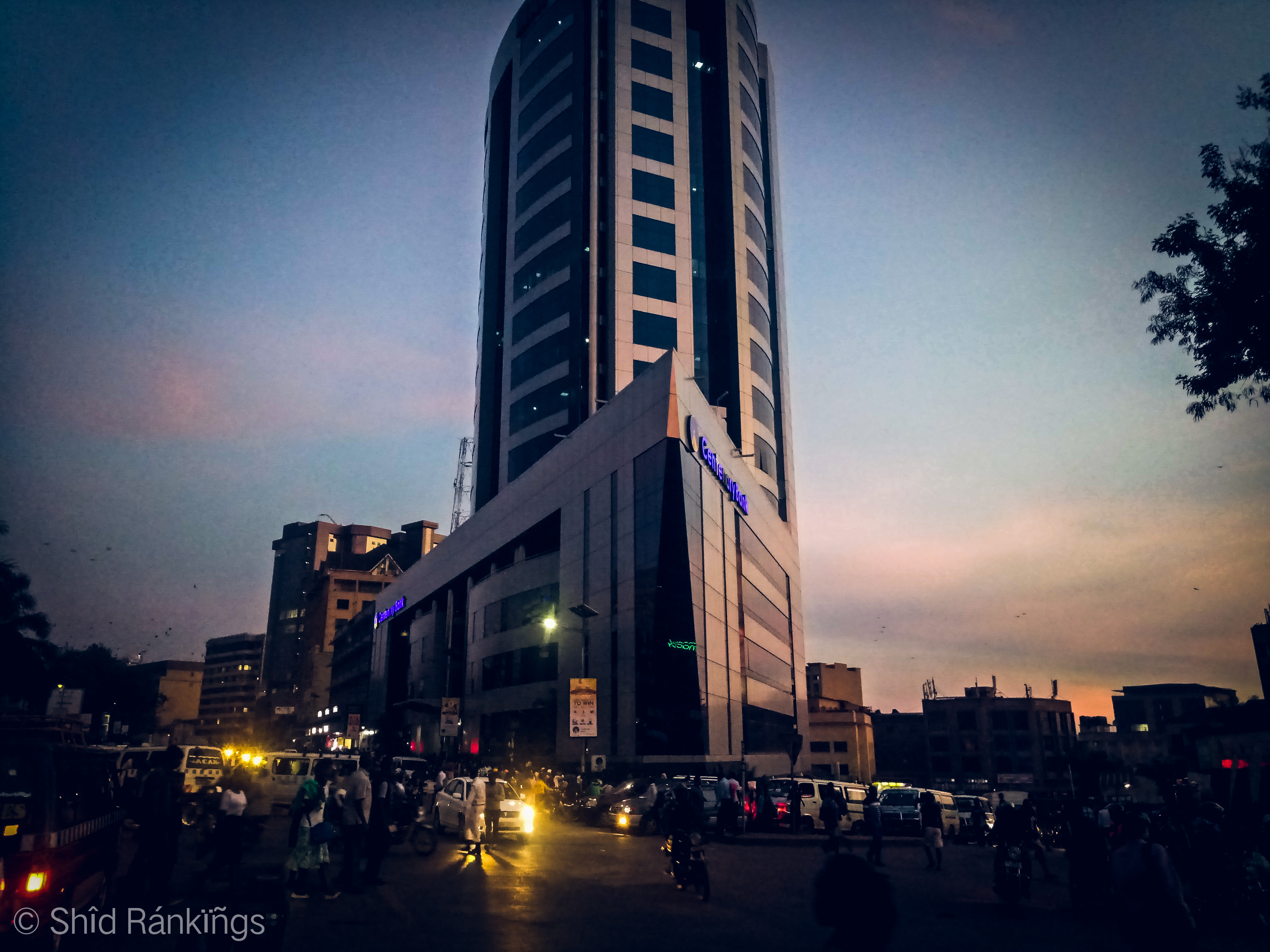

- Location within Kampala

General information
- Type: Commercial
- Location: Kampala Road; Kampala, Uganda
- Coordinates: 00°18′52″N 32°34′42″E
- Construction started: October 2007
- Completed: Opened 10 June 2012
- Cost: US$40 million

Technical details
- Floor count: 19
- Floor area: 17,000 square metres (182,986 sq ft)

Design and construction
- Architects: Ssentoogo & Partners

Ḋ

Mapeera House is a commercial building in Kampala, the capital and largest city of Uganda. The building houses the headquarters of the Centenary Group a diverse financial services conglomerate. It also accommodates the main and largest branch of Centenary Bank, the second-largest commercial bank in Uganda and a component of Centenary Group.

== Location ==
The skyscraper is located on Plot 44/46, Kampala Road, the main business street in Kampala's central business district, where it intersects with Burton Street. The geographical coordinates of Mapeera House are 0°18'52.0"N, 32°34'42.0"E (Latitude:0.314444; Longitude:32.578333).

== Overview ==
Mapeera House is named after Père Siméon Lourdel (1853–1890) M.Afr., referred to in French as Mon Pere and also known as Father Mapeera. "Mapeera" is the Baganda rendition of "Mon Pere". He was the first Catholic Priest to set foot in Uganda in 1879. Mapeera House serves as the headquarters of Centenary Bank, the second-largest bank in Uganda, and the largest indigenous commercial bank in the country, by assets. The bank also maintains its main branch at this location. The building consists of 17,000 square metres (180,000 ft^{2}) of office space, most of it available for rent to qualified tenants, raising income for the bank. However the building is owner-occupied by Centenary Bank. The nineteen-storey building also has 16,000 square metres (170,000 ft^{2}) of underground parking space, enough to accommodate up to about 100 vehicles.

== History ==
The idea to construct Mapeera House was the brainchild of the Late Cardinal Emmanuel Kiwanuka Nsubuga (1914–1991), the first Ugandan to be consecrated Cardinal of the Catholic Church. He died before his dream was realized. In October 2007, after ten years of planning, a ground-breaking ceremony was held at the present location, presided over by Cardinal Emmanuel Wamala, second Ugandan to be consecrated Cardinal. ROKO Construction Company, a Ugandan construction company was contracted to construct the building at an estimated cost of approximately US$30 million (USh75 billion). The building was commissioned on 10 June 2012, by Yoweri Museveni, the president of Uganda. At completion, the construction costs had increased to US$40 million (UGX:100 billion).

== See also ==
- KCCA
- Kampala
- Uganda Banks
- Tall Kampala Buildings
- Centenary Bank
- Central Kampala
