= Accountant general =

Government post in several countries

Accountant general or accountant-general is, or was, the name of a government post in several countries.

== Botswana ==
The office provides financial information, accounting and procurement services.

== England ==
The accountant-general was formerly an officer in the English Court of Chancery who received all moneys lodged in court, deposited them in a bank, and disbursed them. The office was abolished by the Court of Chancery (Funds) Act 1872, with the duties transferred to the Paymaster General. The post was recreated as Accountant General of the Supreme Court in 1925. On 1 April 2009, the title changed to Accountant General of the Senior Courts. The accountant-general can also be head or superintending accountant in certain public offices for example Department of the Accountant-General of the Navy.

== Jamaica ==
The accountant general is appointed by the governor-general on advice of the Public Services Commission under section 15 of the Financial Administration and Audit Act (FAA Act). The Accountant General's Department (AGD) is an operational department within the Ministry of Finance and Planning and is charged with facilitating and reporting of the flow of funds within the public sector.

== India ==
In India, the accountant general is the head of audit team.

== Malawi ==
Malawi has an Accountant General. The first woman to hold the position was Jean Munyenyembe who was appointed in 2020.

== Mauritius ==
The accountant general is the administrative Head of the Treasury of the Republic of Mauritius. The accountant general has to ensure that a proper system of account exists in every department of the Treasury and to exercise general supervision over the receipts of public revenue and over the expenditure of the Government and has to submit to the Director of Audit within six months of the close of every financial year financial statements showing the financial position on the last day of such financial year.

== Nigeria ==
The Office of Accountant-General of the Federation was established under Civil Services re-organization Decree No. 43 in 1988. The incumbent is responsible for the overall management of all receipt and payments of the Republic of Nigeria.

== Singapore ==
The accountant-general is in effect the chief financial officer of the Government and heads a department within the Ministry of Finance. The incumbent has to fulfil statutory duties under the constitution, the Financial Procedure Act and other legislative statutes.

== South Africa ==
The responsibility of the accountant general is to promote and enforce effective management in respect of revenue expenditure, assets and liabilities of institutions in all three spheres of Government. This includes the administration of the National Revenue Fund and the Reconstruction and Development Programme Fund, as well as Banking Services for national departments.
