= Evison Matafale =

Malawian reggae musician (1969-2001)

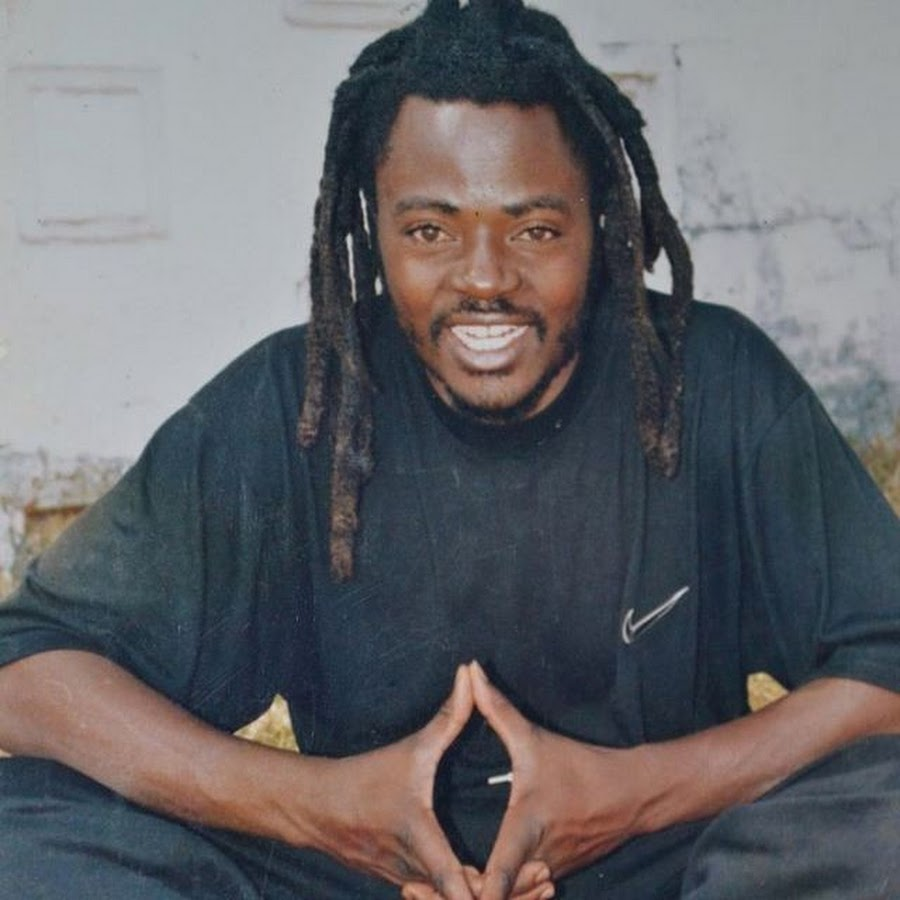
- Born: Evison Matafale; 20 November 1969; Blantyre, Malawi
- Died: 27 November 2001 (aged 32); Lilongwe, Malawi
- Occupation: Musician
- Children: 1
- Musical career
- Genre: Reggae
- Years active: 1999–2001

Evison Matafale (20 November 1969 – 27 November 2001) was a Malawian Rastafarian whose music rose to popularity in Malawi. He was the founder and leader of the reggae band Black Missionaries. Matafale rose to fame and became one of Malawi's favourite musicians by 2000 through the release of his debut album, Kuimba 1, in 1999 with Wailing Brothers Band. Matafale was known as "the prophet" in Malawi and was seen as an elder amongst the community of Malawian Rastafarians.

He later disappeared from the public scene as he was diagnosed with tuberculosis and forced to cut his dreadlocks in order to get medical treatment. He died at the age of 32 in police custody in 2001. He was known for his two albums Kuyimba 1 (1999) and Kuyimba 2 (2001) when he died. Evison Matafale founded and led the reggae band based in his home town of Chileka.

== Rastafarian ==
Matafale was a Rastafarian who wore dreadlocks. He blended his music with a more serious political message with their Rasta philosophy and words of peace, love, and unity in Malawi.

== Political activism ==
He was an outspoken political activist in Malawi. His music reflects his views against the policies of the Muluzi government. His brother, Elton, told journalists the singer was arrested and tortured by the police. Prior to his arrest he had written a series of letters to President Bakili Muluzi denouncing his government's policies. In the letters he wrote he denounced the president's preferential treatment of Muslims and Asian traders and accused him of exploiting ordinary Malawians. He called for respect for all people of Malawi.

== Arrest and Detainment ==
He was arrested on 24 November 2001 after writing a series of complaint letters to the Muluzi government and detained at Maula Prison. At the time of his arrest, he had a dispute with an Asian Merchant in Malawi and was also suffering from malaria. He was taken into custody to be questioned and the police assured his mother that this was routine and that he would be released in a few hours. He was transferred to Lilongwe overnight, however, and according to his autopsy report at Lilongwe Central Hospital by administrator Charles Mwasambo, they revealed that Matafale died of severe pneumonia. He stated that there was no evidence of torture. There was an investigation into the claims of police negligence since he died of natural causes due to an illness while in police custody.

== Funeral ==
Thousands of Malawians had attended the funeral of the artist after his sudden death in prison. It is estimated that more than 10,000 descended to the town of Chileka near Blantyre for his funeral, though it was dreadlocked members of the Rastafarian community in Malawi that dominated the ceremony, turning it into a celebration of his life. Matafale himself had made a prophecy about his death, stating that:

"I don't fear death because my Bible tells me that I should fear the one that kills both body and spirit, not the body alone."

== Family ==
He is survived by a daughter, Theresa Matafale.

== Honours ==
In 2010 on Independence Day, President Bingu wa Mutharika awarded Matafale the Achiever of Malawi Order of National Achiever Award, and a gift of money to his family. His uncle, Charles Gunsaru, expressed the family’s gratitude and said the bereaved family regarded it as an honour.
