= Court of Chancery (Funds) Act 1872 =

Act of the Parliament of the United Kingdom

Court of Chancery (Funds) Act 1872 (Note: Section 1.)
- Act of Parliament
- Parliament of the United Kingdom
- Long title: An Act to abolish the office of Accountant General of the High Court of Chancery in England, and to amend the law respecting the investment of money paid into that Court, and the security and management of the moneys and effects of the suitors thereof.
- Citation: 35 & 36 Vict. c. 44
- Introduced by: William Edward Baxter MP (Commons)
- Territorial extent: United Kingdom

Dates
- Royal assent: 6 August 1872
- Commencement: 7 January 1873 (Note: Section 3. The Chancery Funds Rules 1872.)
- Repealed: 1 January 1926

Other legislation
- Amends: See § Repealed enactments
- Repeals/revokes: See § Repealed enactments
- Amended by: Supreme Court of Judicature (Funds, &c.) Act 1883
- Repealed by: Supreme Court of Judicature (Consolidation) Act 1925

Status: Repealed

History of passage through Parliament

Records of Parliamentary debate relating to the statute from Hansard

Text of statute as originally enacted

The Court of Chancery (Funds) Act 1872 (35 & 36 Vict. c. 44) was an act of the Parliament of the United Kingdom that abolished the office of Accountant General of the High Court of Chancery in England, transferring the functions to the Paymaster General, and established a deposit account for suitors in the Court of Chancery, returning 2% per annum.

== Passage ==
The Court of Chancery (Funds) Bill was first introduced in the 1871 session of parliament, but was withdrawn on 27 July 1871.

Leave to bring in the re-introduced Court of Chancery (Funds) Bill was granted to William Edward Baxter MP, the Solicitor General, Sir George Jessel MP, and William Henry Gladstone MP on 14 February 1872. The bill had its first reading in the House of Commons on 14 February 1872, presented by William Edward Baxter MP. The bill had its second reading in the House of Commons on 4 April 1872, where a motion to postpone the bill for 6-months was rejected. The bill was described as "pretty nearly" the same as the 1871 Bill. During debate, the bill was criticised by members including Mr. Crawford and William Henry Gregory MP, who argued that the current system was working well (with only £1,000 lost to fraud in 150 years) and expressed concerns about mixing judicial and political functions and the government's ulterior motive to use the funds for Terminable Annuities to reduce national debt. On 29 April 1872, a motion to commit the bill to a select committee was withdrawn. The bill was committed to a committee of the whole house, which met on 13 May 1872, where a motion by Sir Richard Baggallay MP to refer the bill to a was defeated. The Committee met again on 28 May 1872 and 4 June 1872 and reported on 13 June 1872, with amendments. Following debate surrounding the pension for the incumbent Accountant General, the amended bill was re-committed to a committee of the whole house, which met and reported immediately on 13 June 1872, with amendments. The amended bill had its third reading in the House of Commons on 18 June 1872 and passed, with amendments.

The bill had its first reading in the House of Lords on 18 June 1872. The bill had its second reading in the House of Lords on 1 July 1872 and was committed to a Committee of the Whole House, which met on 5 July 1872 and 11 July 1872 and reported on 11 July 1872, with amendments. The amended bill had its third reading in the House of Lords on 16 July 1872 and passed, with amendments.

The amended bill was considered and agreed to by the House of Commons on 25 July 1872.

The bill was granted royal assent on 6 August 1872.

== Provisions ==
=== Commencement ===
Chancery Funds Rules 1872
- Statutory Rules and Orders
- Parliament of the United Kingdom
- Introduced by: Roundell Palmer, 1st Earl of Selborne, Lord High Chancellor of Great Britain (Lords)
- Territorial extent: United Kingdom

Dates
- Made: 21 December 1872
- Commencement: 7 January 1873

Other legislation
- Made under: Court of Chancery Funds Act 1872

Text of statute as originally enacted

Section 2 of the act provided that the act would come into operation on a day fixed by a rule made under the act. On 21 December 1872, the Lord Chancellor issued the Chancery Funds Rules 1872, which provided that the act would come into operation on 7 January 1873.

=== Repealed enactments ===
Section 26 of the act repealed 24 enactments, listed in the second schedule to the act. Section 26 of the act also included safeguards to preserve all rights and actions taken before the act's commencement, protect land titles and compensation payments, and maintain existing pension and annuity rights as well as associated duties.

Citation	Short title	Title	Extent of repeal
12 Geo. 1. c. 32	Suitors of Court of Chancery Act 1725	An Act for better securing the moneys and effects of the suitors of the Court of Chancery, and to prevent the counterfeiting of East India Bonds and indorsements thereon, as likewise indorsements on South Sea Bonds.	The whole act.
12 Geo. 1. c. 33	Suitors of Court of Chancery (No. 2) Act 1725	An Act for the relief of the suitors of the High Court of Chancery.	The whole act.
32 Geo. 3. c. 42	Offices of Court of Chancery Act 1792	An Act to empower the High Court of Chancery to lay out a further sum of the suitors money upon proper securities, and for applying the interest towards discharging the expences of the office of the Accountant General, and for building offices for the Masters in Ordinary in Chancery, and a public office for the suitors of the said Court, and offices for the secretaries of bankrupts and lunatics, and for building repositories for securing the title deeds of the suitors of the said Court, and the records and proceedings of the Commissioners of Bankrupts and Lunatics.	The whole act.
37 Geo. 3. c. 135	Legacy Duty Act 1797	An Act to explain and amend an Act passed in the thirty-sixth year of His Majesty's reign, intituled "An Act for repealing certain duties "on legacies and shares of personal estate, and for granting other "duties thereon in certain cases."	The whole act.
52 Geo. 3. c. liv	Court of Chancery Clerks Act 1812	An Act for making further provision for the clerks in the office of the Accountant General of the Court of Chancery after a certain length of service.	The whole act.
54 Geo. 3. c. 14	Accountant-General of Court of Chancery Act 1813	An Act to provide that property vested in the Accountant General of the High Court of Chancery as such shall upon his death, removal, or resignation, vest from time to time in those who shall succeed to the office.	The whole act.
55 Geo. 3. c. lxiv	High Court of Chancery Act 1815	An Act for making further provision for the secretary and usher to the Vice-Chancellor of England, and for the clerks in the office of the Accountant General of the High Court of Chancery, and for providing additional clerks for the said office.	The whole act.
58 Geo. 3. c. lxxx	High Court of Chancery Clerks Act 1818	An Act to provide additional salaries to the present clerks in the Report Office of the High Court of Chancery, and to provide additional clerks for the said office, and for making further provision for the clerks in the said office.	The whole act.
59 Geo. 3. c. xxvii	High Court of Chancery Act 1819	An Act to alter and amend two Acts of His present Majesty's reign for making further provision for certain officers of the High Court of Chancery.	The whole act.
5 & 6 Will. 4. c. 45	Abolition of Slavery Act 1835	An Act to carry into further execution the provisions of an Act passed in the third and fourth years of His present Majesty for compensating owners of slaves upon the abolition of slavery.	The whole act.
6 & 7 Will. 4. c. 5	Abolition of Slavery Act 1836	An Act for carrying into further execution two Acts of His present Majesty relating to the compensation for slaves upon the abolition of slavery, and for facilitating the distribution and payment of such compensation.	The whole act.
6 & 7 Will. 4. c. 82	Abolition of Slavery Act 1836	An Act to carry into further execution an Act for compensating owners of slaves upon the abolition of slavery, and for completing the full payment of such compensation.	The whole act.
4 & 5 Vict. c. 18	Abolition of Slavery Act 1841	An Act to make further provision for facilitating and completing the distribution and payment of compensation for slaves upon the abolition of slavery.	The whole act.
9 & 10 Vict. c. 81	Income Tax Act 1846	An Act for regulating the deduction at the Bank of England of Income Tax Duty in respect of certain offices.	The whole act.
36 Geo. 3. c. 52	Legacy Duty Act 1796	An Act for repealing certain duties on legacies and shares of personal estates and for granting other duties thereon in certain cases.	So much of section thirty-two as requires the Accountant General to invest the money therein mentioned in the purchase of Three per Cent. Consolidated Bank Annuities or to give any certificate.
3 Geo. 4. c. 69	Fees in Common Law Courts Act 1822	An Act to enable the judges of the several Courts of Record at Westminster to make regulations respecting the fees of the officers, clerks, and ministers of the said Courts.	Section one from the words, "for the Lord Chancellor" down to the words "Vice-"Chancellor, respectively "and," and so much of the rest of the Act as relates to that part of section one.
3 & 4 Will. 4. c. 73	Slavery Abolition Act 1833	An Act for the abolition of slavery throughout the British colonies, for promoting the industry of the manumitted slaves, and for compensating the persons hitherto entitled to the services of such slaves.	Sections twenty-four to sixty.
5 Vict. c. 5	Court of Chancery Act 1841	An Act to make further provisions for the administration of justice.	Sections seven to sixteen, and section seventeen, from the words "shall on the fifteenth "day of October," down to the words "and other proceedings," and sections fifty to fifty-five and fifty-seven.
10 & 11 Vict. c. 96	Trustees Relief Act 1847	An Act for better securing Trust Funds and for the relief of trustees.	Section three.
15 & 16 Vict. c. 80	Master in Chancery Abolition Act 1852	An Act to abolish the office of Master in Ordinary of the High Court of Chancery, and to make provision for the more speedy and efficient despatch of business in the said court.	Section fifty-nine.
15 & 16 Vict. c. 87	Suitors in Chancery Relief Act 1852	An Act for the relief of the suitors of the High Court of Chancery.	The whole act, except sections one, three to five, fifteen, sixteen, twenty-one, twenty-three to twenty-six; section twenty-nine, down to the words "better despatch of business;" and sections thirty-five, thirty-seven, thirty-eight, forty, forty-one, forty-two, forty-six, forty-seven, forty-nine, fifty-two, and fifty-five.
16 & 17 Vict. c. 98	Court of Chancery (England) Act 1853	An Act for the further relief of the suitors of the High Court of Chancery.	The whole act, except section eleven.
30 & 31 Vict. c. 87	Court of Chancery (Officers) Act 1867	The Court of Chancery (Officers) Act, 1867.	Sections eleven and twelve.
32 & 33 Vict. c. 91	Courts of Justice (Salaries and Funds) Act 1869	The Courts of Justice (Salaries and Funds) Act, 1869.	Sections four to seven.

== Subsequent developments ==
Courtenay Ilbert described the act as a consolidation act, given that the act, which amended the Metropolitan Board of Works, also consolidated various enactments relating to that particular branch of law.

Section 16 of the act was repealed by section 30 of the Supreme Court of Judicature Act 1875 (38 & 39 Vict. c. 77), which came into force on 1 November 1875.

Section 10 of the act was amended by section 7 of the Supreme Court of Judicature (Funds, &c.) Act 1883 (46 & 47 Vict. c. 29), which came into force on 20 August 1883.

Section 4 from "the office" to "abolished, and", section 22, section 26, the first paragraph, and subsection (1) of the proviso and schedule 2 of the act were repealed by section 1 of, and the schedule to, the Statute Law Revision Act 1878 (46 & 47 Vict. c. 39), which came into force on 25 August 1883.

The whole act was repealed by sections 133(6), 135 and section 226 of, and the sixth schedule to, the Supreme Court of Judicature (Consolidation) Act 1925 (15 & 16 Geo. 5. c. 49), which came into force on 1 January 1926.
