= List of banks in Mozambique =

This is a list of commercial banks in Mozambique, as updated by the Bank of Mozambique in May 2021.

== List of commercial banks ==
- Standard Bank, S.A. (SB), part of Standard Bank Group
- Banco Comercial e de Investimentos, S.A. (BCI)
- First Capital Bank, S.A. (FCB), part of First Capital Bank Group
- Banco Societé Generale Moçambique, S.A. (BSG), subsequently part of Vista Bank Group
- African Banking Corporation (Moçambique), S.A. (ABC)
- FNB Moçambique, S.A., part of FirstRand Group
- Ecobank Moçambique, S.A., part of Ecobank Group
- Moza Banco, S.A.
- United Bank for Africa Moçambique, S.A. (UBA), part of UBA Group
- Nedbank Moçambique, S.A., part of Nedbank Group
- Banco Nacional de Investimento, S.A. (BNI), state-owned
- Banco BIG Moçambique, S.A., part of Banco de Investimento Global Group
- Banco Letshego, S.A., part of Letshego Group
- Access Bank Mozambique, S.A., part of Access Bank Group

== See also ==
- Economy of Mozambique
- List of companies based in Mozambique
- List of banks in Africa
