= CDH Investment Bank =

Company in Malawi

- Type: Private
- Industry: Banking
- Founded: 1998
- Headquarters: Blantyre, Malawi
- Key people: Franklin Kennedy; Chairman; Thoko Mkavea; Chief Executive Officer/Managing Director
- Services: Investment banking, Loans, Savings, Transaction accounts, Investments, Debit cards, Credit cards, Mortgages
- Revenue: ▲Aftertax:MWK:4,900 million (US$6.1 million) (2021)
- Total assets: MW:154 billion (US$192 million) (2021)
- Number of employees: 98+ (2021)
- Website: Homepage

CDH Investment Bank (CDHIB), is an investment bank in Malawi. It is licensed by the Reserve Bank of Malawi, the central bank and national banking regulator.

== Location ==
The headquarters and main branch of the bank are located at CDH House, 5 Independence Drive, in Blantyre, the financial and commercial capital of Malawi. The geographical coordinates of the headquarters of CDH Investment Bank are 15°47'19.0"S, 35°00'13.0"E (Latitude:-15.788611; Longitude:35.003611).

== Overview ==
CDHIB is a medium-sized financial services provider in Malawi. As of December 2018, the bank's total assets were valued at MWK:154,005,233,000 (US$192 million), with shareholders' equity of MWK:15.995 billion (US$19.87 million).

== History ==
CDHIB was founded in 1998 as Continental Discount House Limited (CDH), which has operated in the financial sector since August that year. In May 2011, CDH was granted a banking license by the Reserve Bank of Malawi. The institution dropped the discount house license it previously held, but continues to offer almost all services it used to under the discount hous→→e licence, like trading financial instruments and corporate financial advisory. It then rebranded to CDH Investment Bank. In April 2012, CDHIB commenced commercial and investment banking business by opening its main branch in Blantyre, and a second branch in Lilongwe, the capital of Malawi.

== Ownership ==
As of December 2018, the shares of stock of CDH Investment Bank are privately owned by the following corporate entities:

CDH Investment Bank Stock Ownership
Rank	Name of Owner	Percentage Ownership
1	Continental Holdings Limited of Malawi	82.46
2	Investments Alliance Limited	10.17
3	Kesaart Capital Limited	4.84
4	Savannah Investments Limited	2.52
	Total	100.00

== Branches ==
As of December 2018, the bank maintained networked branches at the following locations:

1. CDH Branch: CDH House, 5 Independence Drive, Blantyre
2. Capital City Banking Centre: CDH Investment Bank Centre, Lilongwe
3. Lilongwe Banking Centre: City Mall Complex, Lilongwe

== See also ==
- List of banks in Malawi
- Economy of Malawi
- Reserve Bank of Malawi
