= First Capital Bank Zimbabwe Limited =

Zimbabwean commercial bank

Coordinates: 17°49′50″S 31°02′59″E

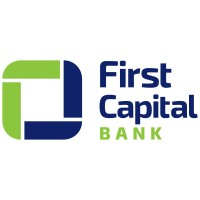
- Formerly: Barclays Bank of Zimbabwe
- Company type: Public
- Traded as: ZSE: FCAZW
- Industry: Financial services
- Founded: 1912; 114 years ago
- Headquarters: Harare, Zimbabwe
- Key people: Patrick Devenish; Chairman; Ciaran McSharry; Acting Managing Director
- Products: Loans, transaction accounts, savings, investments, debit cards
- Revenue: ▲Aftertax:
- Total assets: US$700 million (2018)
- Number of employees: 711 (2020)
- Parent: FMB Capital Holdings
- Website: firstcapitalbank.co.zw

First Capital Bank Zimbabwe Limited, formerly known as Barclays Bank of Zimbabwe, is a commercial bank in Zimbabwe, licensed by the Reserve Bank of Zimbabwe, the central bank and national banking regulator.

The bank is a subsidiary of FMBCapital Holdings Plc, a financial services conglomerate, based in Mauritius with other subsidiaries in Botswana, Malawi, Mozambique, Zambia.

== Location ==
The headquarters and main branch of the bank are located in Barclay House, at the corner of Jason Moyo Street and First Street, in downtown Harare, the largest city and capital of Zimbabwe. The geographical coordinates of the headquarters of First Capital Bank Zimbabwe are:17°49'50.0"S 31°02'59.0"E (Latitude:-17.830556; Longitude:31.049722).

== Overview ==
The bank is a large financial services provider in Zimbabwe, serving large corporations, small-to-medium enterprises (SMEs), as well as individuals. As of December 2018, its total asset base was valued at US$698,744,000, with shareholders' equity of US$116,503,000.

== History ==
Barclays Bank Zimbabwe (BBZ) was established in 1912, and it operated continuously until 2018. As of October 2017, BBZ employed in excess of 700 permanent staff, in a commercial banking network of 26 branches in all large urban areas in the country. In October 2017, it was announced that First Merchant Bank Malawi had purchased a controlling interest in BBZ, for an undisclosed consideration. Under the terms of the sale, the bank was given permission to continue the use of the Barclays name for up to three years, before rebranding.

During the 2008–2012 time frame, the bank employed a maximum of 1,423 employees in January 2008, but the payroll was "rationalized" to about 700, by the time FMB Capital Holdings Plc acquired the bank.

In October 2018, the bank rebranded from Barclays Bank of Zimbabwe to First Capital Bank Zimbabwe Limited, to reflect its current shareholding.

In March 2019, the bank migrated from the Barclays banking system to a new IT banking system.

== Ownership ==
First Capital Bank Zimbabwe Limited (FCBZL), is a subsidiary of FMB Capital Holdings Plc, a Mauritius-based financial services conglomerate, with subsidiaries in several Southern African countries, including Botswana, Malawi, Mozambique, Zambia, and Zimbabwe. The shares of stock of FCBZL are listed on the Zimbabwe Stock Exchange. The major shareholders in the bank are depicted in the table below, as of October 2017.

Barclays Bank of Zimbabwe Stock Ownership

Rank	Name of owner	Percentage ownership
1	FMB Capital Holdings Plc of Mauritius	42.0
2	Private and institutional investors	33.0
3	BBZ Employee Share Ownership Trust	15.0
4	Barclays Bank Plc of the United Kingdom	10.0
	Total	100.00

== Branches ==
As of April 2020, First Capital Bank Zimbabwe Limited maintained a network of branches at the following locations.

1. Agribusiness Branch: 2 Premium Close, Mt Pleasant, Harare
2. Avondale Branch: King George Road, Avondale, Harare
3. Beitbridge Branch: 348 Justia Road, Beitbridge
4. Belmont Branch: 16 Plumtree Road, Belmont, Bulawayo
5. Bindura Branch: 25 Main Street, Bindura
6. Borrowdale Branch: TM Supermarket Complex, Borrowdale Road, Borrowdale, Harare
7. Bulawayo Affluent Centre: 97A Robert Mugabe Way, Bulawayo
8. Chinhoyi Branch: 5308 Magamba Way, Chinhoyi
9. Chiredzi Branch: 57 Chilonga Drive, Chiredzi
10. Corporate Banking Centre: Birmingham Road at Paisley Road, Southerton, Harare
11. First Street Branch: Barclay House, Jason Moyo Street at First Street, Harare Main Branch
12. Gokwe Branch: Stand 972 Gokwe Growth Point, Gokwe
13. Gweru Branch: Main Street at Robert Mugabe Way, Gweru
14. Harare Street Branch: 118 Harare Street, Harare
15. Kadoma Branch: Stand 156, Herbert Chitepo Road, Kadoma
16. Kwekwe Branch: 32 North Mandela Way, Kwekwe
17. Main Street Branch: 100 Main Street, Bulawayo
18. Marondera Branch: Hotel Street at The Green, Marondera
19. Masvingo Branch: Robert Mugabe Street at Takawira Avenue, Masvingo
20. Msasa Branch: 120–121 Mutare Road, Msasa, Harare
21. Mutare Branch: 90 H. Chitepo Street, Mutare
22. Pearl House Branch: First Street at Samora Machel Avenue, Harare.

== See also ==
- List of banks in Zimbabwe
- Reserve Bank of Zimbabwe
- First Capital Bank Group
