= Banco Nacional de Investimento =

National development bank of Mozambique

BNI Banco Nacional de Investimento
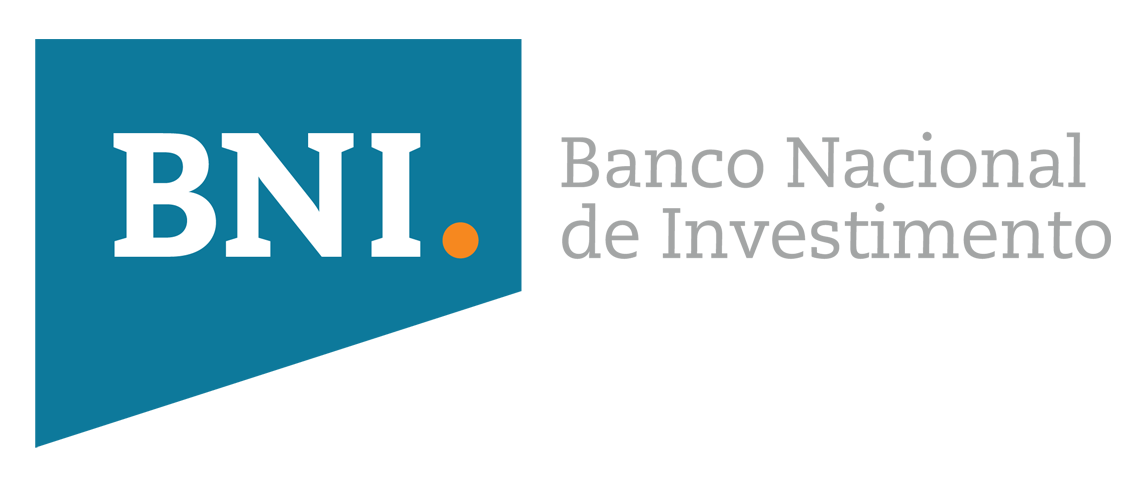
- Company type: Government-owned corporation
- Industry: Banking; Financial services Development
- Founded: 2010
- Headquarters: Av. Julius Nyerere, 3504, Maputo, Mozambique.
- Key people: Omar Mithá (Chairman)
- Products: Asset management, investment banking, fund management, financial advisory, capital markets
- Number of employees: 72 (2021)
- Website: www.bni.co.mz

The National Investment Bank (Portuguese: Banco Nacional de Investimento, abbreviated: BNI) is a Mozambican state owned development bank in association with the Mozambican Ministry of Finance. Its goal is to provide long-term financing for sustainable endeavours that contribute to the country's social and economic development. The bank's main areas of activities are Infrastructure, Natural Resources, Energy, Agriculture, Industry & Commerce and Transportation. BNI also seeks to strengthen the capital structure of private companies and the development of capital markets.

== History ==
BNI was founded in 2010, initially established as the country's first investment bank, through a joint venture between the governments of Portugal (through Caixa Geral de Depósitos) and Mozambique (through the National Treasure Directorate). With a starting capital forecasted at US$500 million, the bank was created to facilitate a closer cooperation between Mozambique and Portugal, and foment various projects, mainly Infrastructure, Natural Resources (mining & hydrocarbons) and Energy.

In August 2012, BNI took an advisory role in the government acquisition of a 5% stake at Vale (mining company) operation in Mozambique.

Given the rapid growth of the Mozambican economy, and consequently the need of the government to participate in the equity of capital-intensive Infrastructure and Natural Resources projects, in December 2012, the Portuguese shares, at the time owned by Caixa Geral de Depositos, were acquired by the Mozambican State through its Equity Agency, Institute of Management of State Holdings (IGEPE) From this point onwards, BNI started to focus more on its role of a Development bank, although it still has a strong investment banking arm.

As of the end of 2013, BNI was assigned by government protocols and agreements with foreign development banks like BNDES from Brazil and KFW from Germany, aiming to facilitate public–private partnerships between foreign companies and state owned corporations concerning major projects in the country, sometimes managing funds for the purpose such as was the case with COFIDES from Spain, which in October 2013 committed a €75 million to such partnerships.

In April 2014, BNI arranged for a loan of US$680 million from the Exim Bank of China for construction of the Maputo Sul Catembè bridge.

== See also ==
- List of national development banks
- List of banks in Mozambique
