= First Capital Bank Malawi Limited =

Malawian commercial bank

Coordinates: 15°47′08″S 35°00′25″E

First Capital Bank Malawi Plc
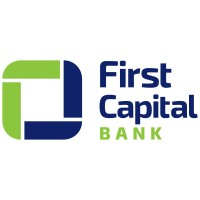
- Type: Subsidiary of FMB Capital Holdings: MSE: FMBCH
- Industry: Banking
- Predecessor: First Merchant Bank (FMB)
- Founded: 1995; 31 years ago
- Headquarters: Blantyre, Malawi
- Key people: T. Davidson; Chairman; Hitesh Anadkat; Founder & Chief Executive Officer
- Net income: ▲Aftertax: MWK:29.944 billion (US$17.39 million) (2023)
- Total assets: MWK:483.65 (US$280.82 million) (2023)
- Parent: FMBCapital Holdings Plc
- Website: www.firstcapitalbank.co.mw

First Capital Bank Malawi Plc, formerly known as First Merchant Bank Plc, is a commercial bank in Malawi. It is licensed by the Reserve Bank of Malawi, the central bank and national banking regulator. It is a subsidiary of FMB Capital Holdings.

== Location ==
First Capital Bank Malawi maintains its headquarters, and main branch in Livingstone Towers, along Glyn Jones Road, in the city of Blantyre, the financial capital of Malawi. The geographical coordinates of the bank's headquarters are: 15°47'08.0"S, 35°00'25.0"E (Latitude:-15.785556; Longitude:35.006944).

== Overview ==
The First Capital Bank of Malawi is a medium-sized financial services provider in Malawi. It offers retail banking services to individuals and corporate clients. As of December 2023, the bank's total asset base was valued at MWK:483.65 billion (US$280.82 million, with shareholders' equity of MWK:77.553 billion (US$45.3 million).

== History ==
First Capital Bank was founded as First Merchant Bank in 1995 by Hitesh Anadkat and his family, who partnered with Prime Bank of Kenya. It became Malawi's first private bank and was granted the third ever banking licence in Malawi. With focus on Malawi's corporate market, and with a large emphasis on service and customer relationships, First Capital had a successful start and began to show profits after only two years of trading.

In the year 2000, First Capital wholly acquired the Leasing and Finance Company Malawi Limited, which has since been dissolved and merged into First Capital Bank Malawi. In 2008, First Capital led a consortium that was granted a banking licence in Botswana, where a subsidiary of FMBCapital Holdings Plc, First Capital Bank Botswana Limited, trades. The bank expanded its regional footprint in 2013, with the acquisition of the ICB Banking Group's businesses in Malawi, Zambia and Mozambique.

The bank listed on Malawi's stock exchange in 2009, when almost 10 percent of its net shares were offered in the IPO. In 2017, First Capital announced that it was in the advanced stages of talks with Barclays to acquire a controlling stake in Barclays' Zimbabwe operation. Also in 2017, it was announced that First Capital had wholly bought out Opportunity Bank of Malawi.

In December 2017, First Capital Bank Malawi de-listed its shares from the Malawi Stock Exchange (MSE). The value of First Capital stock shares were acquired by the newly-created holding company, First Merchant Bank Capital Holdings Plc (FMBCH), whose shares are now listed in the MSE.

As of September 2017, First Capital Bank Malawi, was the third-largest bank in the country by assets and it enjoyed an estimated 16.8 percent market share.

== FMBCapital Holdings Plc ==
FMBCapital Holdings Plc is the Mauritian-based holding company that owns First Capital Bank Malawi, as well as its affiliated companies. The group owns either wholly or in part, seven subsidiary companies. The Group is a large financial services conglomerate, serving communities in Malawi, Botswana, Zambia, Mozambique and Zimbabwe. Member companies of the FMBCapital Holdings Group include the following:

- First Capital Bank Malawi Limited: 100% ownership, established June 1995.
- First Capital Bank Botswana Limited: 40% ownership, established July 2008.
- First Capital Bank Mozambique: 70% ownership, acquired June 2013.
- First Capital Bank Zambia Limited: 49% ownership, acquired June 2013.
- First Capital Bank Zimbabwe Limited: 62% ownership, acquired October 2017.

== Branches ==
As of April 2020, the bank maintained branches at the following locations:

1. Blantyre Branch: First House, Glyn Jones Road, Blantyre
2. Capital City Branch: Chief M’mbelwa House, Robert Mugabe Crescent, City Centre, Lilongwe
3. Limbe Branch: FMB Building, Churchill Road, Limbe
4. Lilongwe Branch: Old Kandodo Building, Kamuzu Procession Road, Lilongwe
5. First Corporate Service Branch: Livingstone Towers, Glyn Jones Road, Blantyre
6. Mzuzu Branch: Orton Chirwa Avenue, Mzuzu
7. Zomba Branch: Kamuzu Highway & Main Road, Zomba

In addition to the seven brick-and-mortar branches, the bank maintains another 22 agency banking locations, where the financial institution's services can be accessed.

== See also ==
- List of banks in Malawi
- Economy of Malawi
- Reserve Bank of Malawi
