= Supreme Court of Judicature (Funds, &c.) Act 1883 =

Act of the Parliament of the United Kingdom

Supreme Court of Judicature (Funds, &c.) Act 1883 (Note: Section 8.)
- Act of Parliament
- Parliament of the United Kingdom
- Long title: An Act to consolidate the Accounting Departments of the Supreme Court of Judicature, and for other purposes.
- Citation: 46 & 47 Vict. c. 29
- Territorial extent: United Kingdom

Dates
- Royal assent: 20 August 1883
- Commencement: 20 August 1883 (Note: The Acts of Parliament (Commencement) Act 1793.)
- Repealed: 1 January 1926

Other legislation
- Amends: Court of Chancery (Funds) Act 1872
- Repealed by: Supreme Court of Judicature (Consolidation) Act 1925

Status: Repealed

Text of statute as originally enacted

The Supreme Court of Judicature (Funds, &c.) Act 1883 (46 & 47 Vict. c. 29) was an act of the Parliament of the United Kingdom that consolidated the accounting departments of the Supreme Court of Judicature into a single department under Her Majesty's Paymaster-General.

== Subsequent developments ==
The whole act was repealed by section 226(1) of, and the sixth schedule to, the Supreme Court of Judicature (Consolidation) Act 1925 (15 & 16 Geo. 5. c. 49), which came into force on 1 January 1926.
