= Jean Munyenyembe =

- Known for: first woman accountant general in Malawi

Jean Munyenyembe is a Malawian civil servant who became her country's first woman accountant general in 2020. After 2022 she was a Principal Secretary working in different Ministries.

== Life ==
Munyenyembe became Malawi's first woman Accountant General. She was appointed by President Chakwera in a re-shuffle replacing Sungani Mandala in August 2020.

She tried to improve training arguing that her officers could more easily identify corruption if they were better trained. By March 2022 she had a second trench of government finance officers from ministries, government departments and agencies off to Salima to be trained at the Malawi Institute of Management.

The Centre for Democracy and Economic Development Initiatives called for her resignation together with that of Secretary to Treasury MacDonald Mafuta Mwale in July 2022 over an allowances scandal. Junior civil servants were investigated for corruption. The conclusion was that more senior people had to be involved and she and MacDonald Mafuta Mwale should take responsibility.

Colleen Zamba, who worked for the President, had her replaced in November 2022 by Henry Kissinger Mphasa. 40 employees had been arrested over a shortfall of 300 million kwacha in a scandal about allowances.

She returned to the position of Principal Secretary working in the Ministry of Tourism in August 2026 and in the Ministry of Industrialisation, Business, Trade and Tourism.
