= Chiwembe =

Township in southern Malawi

Chiwembe is a township in southern Malawi. It is situated approximately 1.5 kilometres (1 mi) south of the town of Limbe and 13 km (8 mi) from Blantyre, Malawi's biggest city.

Chiwembe is mentioned in the song Police Hunt Matafale by the popular Malawian reggae band Black Missionaries. Chiwembe is also where the football association of Malawi has its headquarters. It has well planned housing with the Malawi Housing Cooperation as the landlords of most of the housing.

An informal settlement also known as Blantyre town, the area was used in a 1999 survey study by the University of Notre Dame.

Sports in the area include football and in 2024, the Malawai National Under 20s team were camped at a site in Chiwembe.
