= NBS Bank =

Commercial bank in Malawi

- Type: Public: MSE: NBS
- Industry: Banking
- Headquarters: Blantyre,0980857543 Malawi
- Key people: Vizenge Kumwenda; Chairman; Temwani Simwaka; CEO
- Products: Loans, Savings, Checking, Investments, Debit cards, Credit cards, Mortgages
- Revenue: ▲ Aftertax: MWK:1.7 billion (US$2.35 million) (2018)
- Total assets: MWK:123.1 billion (US$170 million) (2018)
- Number of employees: 342 (2018)
- Website: Homepage

NBS Bank Limited, commonly referred to as NBS Bank, is a commercial bank in Malawi. It is licensed as a commercial bank, by the Reserve Bank of Malawi, central bank and national banking regulator.

== Location ==
The head office and man branch of NBS Bank are located in NBS House, at the corner of Chipembere Highway and Johnstone Road, in the city of Blantyre, the financial capital of Malawi. This location is often referred to as Ginnery Corner, in the neighborhood known as Chichiri, Blantyre. The geographical coordinates of this bank's headquarters are: 15°48'02.0"S, 35°01'20.0"E (Latitude:-15.800556; Longitude:35.022222).

== Overview ==
NBS Bank is a midsized retail bank in Malawi. As of December 2018, the bank's asset base was valued at MWK:123.1 billion (US$170 million), with shareholders' equity of MWK:11.5 billion (approximately US$16 million).

== History ==
In 1964, Central Africa Building Society, Commonwealth Century Building Society and First Permanent Building Society merged to form New Building Society (NBS). The institution converted into a commercial bank in 2004, following the issuance of a banking license by the Reserve Bank of Malawi, the national banking regulator.

== Ownership ==
The shares of the bank are traded on the Malawi Stock Exchange, where they are listed under the symbol NBS. The shareholders in the stock of NBS Bank included the following, as of December 2018:

Shareholding in NBS Bank
Rank	Shareholder	Percentage Ownership
1	NICO Holdings Plc	50.10
2	Public Service Pension Trust Fund – CAM	12.06
3	Public Shareholding	35.74
4	National Investment Trust Limited	2.00
4	NBS Bank Employee Share Ownership Scheme	0.10
	Total	100.0

== Branches and departments ==
As of April 2020, the bank maintains branches at the following locations. The branches are referred to as Service Centres.

1. Mzuzu Service Centre: Mzuzu
2. Mzimba Service Centre: Mzimba
3. Nkhotakota Service Centre: Nkhotakota
4. Nkhata Bay Service Centre: Nkhata Bay
5. Dwangwa Service Centre: Dangwa
6. Rumphi Service Centre: Rumphi
7. Karonga Service Centre: Karonga
8. Mchinji Service Centre: Mchinji
9. Kasungu Service Centre: Kasungu
10. Lilongwe Service Centre: Lilongwe
11. Capital City Service Centre: Lilongwe
12. Dedza Service Centre: Dedza
13. Kanengo Service Centre: Kanengo, Lilongwe
14. Salima Service Centre: Salima
15. Liwonde Service Centre: Liwonde
16. Blantyre Service Centre: Blantyre
17. Ginnery Corner Service Centre: Chichiri, Blantyre Main Branch
18. Limbe Service Centre: Limbe
19. Zomba Service Centre: Zomba
20. Mangochi Service Centre: Mangochi
21. Mulanje Service Centre: Mulanje
22. Chichiri Mall Service Centre: Chichiri Mall, Chichiri, Blantyre
23. Nchalo Service Centre: Nchalo, Blantyre
24. Ntcheu Service Centre: Ntecheu
25. Balaka Service Centre: Balaka.

== Governance ==
Vizenge Kumwenda serves as the chairman of the eleven-person board of directors. The chief executive officer was Kwanele Ngwenya, who is assisted by fifteen other senior managers in the day-to-day running of the company. In April 2025, Temwani Simwaka was appointed as chief executive officer, becoming the first woman to hold the position.

== Recapitalization ==
During 2015, NBS Bank fell below the minimum capital requirements for commercial banks in Malawi, under the Basel II financial guidelines. NBS Bank applied to the Reserve Bank of Malawi to be given time to implement a rights issue and restore compliance. That permission was granted, with a deadline of 30 June 2017. The capital call to existing shareholders was opened from 19 May 2017 and closed on 23 June 2017. A total of MWK:11.6 billion (approximately US$16.25 million) in new capital was raised. Other changes at the bank, in the same time frame, included retrenchment of some of the employees.

== See also ==
- List of banks in Malawi
- Economy of Malawi
- Reserve Bank of Malawi
- Malawi Stock Exchange
