= Temwani Simwaka =

- Education: Malawi University of Business and Applied Sciences
- Occupation: Banker
- Employer: NBS Bank plc
- Known for: First woman chief executive officer of NBS Bank
- Title: Chief Executive Officer

Temwani Simwaka is a Malawian banker who has been the chief executive officer of NBS Bank plc, a commercial bank listed on the Malawi Stock Exchange, since April 2025. She is the first woman to hold the position.

== Education and qualifications ==
Simwaka holds a Bachelor of Commerce in accountancy and a diploma in business studies from the Malawi University of Business and Applied Sciences. She is a certified public accountant and a Fellow of the Association of Chartered Certified Accountants. Between November 2018 and July 2019 Simwaka participated in the BANKSETA African Expansion Leadership Programme, a programme for senior African banking executives that included study blocks in South Africa, Egypt, Morocco and Angola.

== Career ==
Simwaka has worked in financial services for more than twenty-five years. She became deputy chief executive officer of NBS Bank in 2022, in that role she oversaw the migration of the bank's core banking system, replacing its existing Temenos T24 platform with Oracle Financial Services' Flexcube and associated digital channel products in October 2024, and led the establishment of the bank's foreign exchange bureau. Her appointment as chief executive officer was effective 1 April 2025, she succeeded Kwanele Ngwenya who had led the bank since 2017.

Africa.com included her in its Definitive List of African Women Executives in 2025.

In August 2026 she announced that the NBS bank would be rewarding the Malawi women's national football team following their giant killer run at the Women's Africa Cup of Nations (WAFCON). At their debut the team made the final and qualified for the World Cup. The bank announced that it would pay 7 million kwacha direct into each player's bank account.
