= Centenary Bank Malawi =

Commercial bank in Malawi

Coordinates: 13°57′29″S 33°47′25″E

Centenary Bank Malawi Limited
- Type: Private company: Subsidiary of Centenary Group
- Industry: Financial services
- Founded: March 23, 2023; 3 years ago
- Headquarters: Lilongwe, Malawi
- Key people: Francis Pelekamoyo, Chairperson; Godfrey Byekwaso, Acting CEO
- Products: Loans, Transaction accounts, Savings, Investments, Debit Cards
- Revenue: ▲After tax:MWK:549 million (US$319,000) (December 2023)
- Total assets: MWK:123 billion (US$71.6 million) (December 2023)
- Website: centenarybank.co.mw

Centenary Bank Malawi, also Centenary Bank Malawi Limited, is a commercial bank in Malawi. It is one of the commercial banks licensed by the Reserve Bank of Malawi, the central bank and national banking regulator.

== Location ==
The headquarters and main branch of Centenary Bank Malawi Limited are located at Ekistics House, Convention Drive, Lilongwe 3, in Malawi.

== Overview ==
As of October 2022, the total assets of MyBucks Bank Malawi, the predecessor of Centenary Bank Malawi, were valued at approximately MWK:122 billion. As of December 2023, the bank's assets were valued at MWK123 billion (approx. US$71.6 million). The bank declared an after-tax profit of MWK:549 million (US$319,000), for the twelve months ending on 31 December 2023.

== History ==
The bank was established in October 2022, when the Centenary Group, a financial services conglomerate headquartered in Uganda, that is affiliated with the Roman Catholic Church in Uganda, acquired majority shareholding in the erstwhile MyBucks Bank Malawi. At the same time, the Roman Catholic Archdiocese of Lilongwe acquired the remaining minority shareholding. The new bank rebranded as Centenary Bank Malawi Limited. Before that, MyBucks Bank Malawi was 100 percent owned by MyBucks SA, a financial outfit based in Luxembourg, that went into bankruptcy in December 2021.

Centenary Bank rebranded from MyBucks Bank Malawi on 23 March 2023, after attaining a commercial banking license from the Reserve Bank of Malawi, earlier that month.

== Ownership ==
The table below, represents the shareholding in the stock of Centenary Bank Malawi Limited, as of December 2022.

Centenary Bank Malawi Limited Stock Ownership
| Rank | Name of Owner | Percentage Ownership |
|---|---|---|
| 1 | Centenary Group of Uganda | 51.0 |
| 2 | Roman Catholic Diocese of Lilongwe in Malawi | 49.0 |
| | Total | 100.00 |

== Branches ==
As of February 2022, MyBucks Bank Malawi Limited, the predecessor of Centenary Bank Malawi Limited maintained networked brick-and-mortar branches in eight cities, towns and other urban centers, including Blantyre, Lilongwe, Dzaleka, Kasungu, Madisi, Mangochi, Mzuzu and Zomba. At that time, they also maintained 85 banking agents and 30 automated teller machines, across the country. In April 2023, the bank had 14 brick and mortar branches across Malawi.

== Governance ==
As of October 2023, the Chairman of the board of directors is Francis Z. Pelekamoyo, a former Governor of the Reserve Bank of Malawi. Godfrey Byekwaso serves as the acting CEO of the bank.

== See also ==
- List of banks in Malawi
- Reserve Bank of Malawi
- Economy of Malawi
