= FMBCapital Holdings Plc =

Mauritian financial services company

Coordinates: 20°14′32″S 57°29′34″E

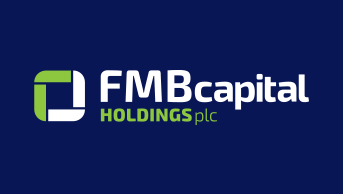
- Trade name: FMBCapital Bank
- Type: Public
- Traded as: MSE: FMBCH
- Industry: Financial services
- Predecessor: First Merchant Bank Group (FMB Group)
- Founded: 1995; 31 years ago Blantyre, Malawi
- Founder: Hitesh Anadkat
- Headquarters: Ebene, Mauritius
- Area served: Botswana, Malawi, Mozambique, Zambia, Zimbabwe
- Key people: Terence Davidson; Chairman; Jaco Viljoen; Managing Director
- Products: Banking
- Total assets: US$:2.067 billion (December 2024)
- Number of employees: 1,773 (December 2021)
- Website: fmbcapitalgroup.com

FMBCapital Holdings Plc, also referred to as First Capital Bank Group, is a financial services holding company based in Mauritius. It operates commercial banks in the Southern African countries of Botswana, Malawi, Mozambique, Zambia and Zimbabwe, which trade as First Capital Bank.

== Overview ==
As of December 2021, the Group had assets of US$1.375 billion. At that time, the group held US$887.2 millions in customer deposits in five Southern African countries and employed over 1,770 staff. At that time, shareholders' equity was US$116.7 million.

== History ==
FMBCapital Holdings was founded in Malawi in 1995 as First Merchant Bank by Hitesh Anadkat and his family, who partnered with Prime Bank of Kenya. It became Malawi's first private bank and was granted the third ever banking licence in Malawi. First Capital had a successful start and began to show profits after only two years of trading.

In the year 2000, First Capital wholly acquired the Leasing and Finance Company Malawi Limited, which has since been dissolved and merged into First Capital Bank Malawi. In 2008, First Capital led a consortium that was granted a banking licence in Botswana, leading to the establishment of First Capital Bank Botswana Limited. The bank expanded its regional footprint in 2013, with the acquisition of the ICB Banking Group's businesses in Malawi, Zambia and Mozambique.

First Capital listed on the Malawi Stock Exchange in 2009. In 2017, First Capital acquired 100 percent ownership in Opportunity Bank of Malawi. That same year, First Capital acquired a controlling stake in Barclays Bank of Zimbabwe. In December 2017, First Capital de-listed its shares from the Malawi Stock Exchange (MSE). The value of First Capital stock shares were acquired by the newly-created holding company, FMBCapital Holdings Plc, whose shares are now listed in the MSE.

== Ownership ==
The shares of stock of FMBCapital holdings Plc are traded under the symbol FMBCH. As of 31 December 2018, the countries of origin of the shareholders is as illustrated in the table below.

FMBCapital Plc Stock Ownership
Rank	Country	Number of Investors	Percentage of Total	Percentage Ownership
1	Angola	5	0.29	0.01
2	Botswana	1	0.06	0.00
3	Cayman Islands	1	0.06	0.00
4	Isle of Man	1	0.06	3.59
5	Kenya	3	0.17	21.36
6	Malawi	1,656	95.39	27.10
7	Mauritius	1	0.06	31.17
8	Portugal	8	0.46	0.09
9	South Africa	4	0.23	0.00
10	United Kingdom	8	0.46	16.60
11	United States	6	0.35	0.03
12	Undisclosed	40	2.30	0.04
13	Zimbabwe	2	0.12	0.00

== Governance ==
The group is governed by a seven-person board of directors, comprising a non-executive chairman, four non-executive directors, and two executive directors. As of 2022, the group chairman is Terence Davidson and the group managing director is Jaco Viljoen. Hitesh Anadkat sits on the board as a non-executive director.

== Subsidiaries ==
Te subsidiary companies of FMBCapital Holdings Plc include the following:

- First Capital Bank Malawi Limited: 100% ownership, established June 1995.
- First Capital Bank Botswana Limited: 42% ownership, established July 2008.
- First Capital Bank Mozambique: 80% ownership, acquired June 2013.
- First Capital Bank Zambia Limited: 49% ownership, acquired June 2013.
- First Capital Bank Zimbabwe Limited: 62% ownership, acquired October 2017.

== See also ==
- List of banks in Botswana
- List of banks in Malawi
- List of banks in Mozambique
- List of banks in Zambia
- List of banks in Zimbabwe
