= First Capital Bank Zambia Limited =

Zambian commercial bank

Coordinates: 15°24′55″S 28°17′47″E

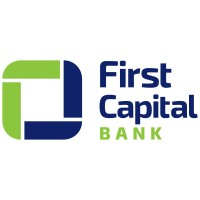
- Formerly: International Commercial Bank (ICB)
- Company type: Public
- Industry: Banking
- Founded: 2010; 16 years ago
- Headquarters: Stand No. 30078, Corner Chilubi Road and Church Road, Fairview Area, Lusaka, Zambia
- Key people: Mark O'Donnell; Chairman; Hitesh Anadkat; Vice Chairman; Edward Marks; Chief Executive Officer
- Products: Loans, savings, checking, investments, debit cards, mortgages
- Revenue: ▲Aftertax: ZMW:28,944,868 (US$1.6 million) (2018)
- Total assets: ZMW:1.2 trillion (US$65 million) (2018)
- Number of employees: 118 (2018)
- Parent: FMB Capital Holdings
- Website: www.firstcapitalbank.co.zm

First Capital Bank Zambia Limited, is a commercial bank in Zambia that is licensed by the Bank of Zambia, the national banking regulator. It is a subsidiary of FMBCapital Holdings Plc, a financial services conglomerate, based in Mauritius, whose shares of stock are listed on the Malawi Stock Exchange and has subsidiaries in Botswana, Malawi, Mozambique, Zambia and Zimbabwe.

== Location ==
The headquarters of the bank and its main branch are located at First Capital House, Stand No. 30078, Corner Chilubi Road and Church Road, Fairview Area, in Lusaka, Zambia's capital city. The geographical coordinates of the bank's headquarters are:15°24'55.0"S, 28°17'47.0"E (Latitude:-15.415278; Longitude:28.296389).

== Overview ==
First Capital Bank Zambia Limited is a subsidiary of FMBcapital Holdings PLC. It is full-service commercial bank offering financial products and services to all sectors in the Zambian market. The bank offers services in the Premier Banking, Corporate and Commercial Banking, and Institutional Banking sectors. The Bank currently has 7 branches and 1 agency: Six in Lusaka and two on the Copperbelt (Ndola and Kitwe). The Bank has over 165 employees who serve more than 10,500 clients. .

== History ==
The bank was established in 2010 as International Commercial Bank Zambia. In 2013, First Merchant Bank successfully acquired the subsidiaries of International Commercial Bank in Malawi, Mozambique and Zambia. Although the banking business of ICB Malawi was not viable, FMB would be able to enter into the other two countries through the acquisition.

In December 2017, First Capital Bank Zambia became a subsidiary of First Merchant Bank Capital Holdings Plc, of Mauritius, whose shares trade on the Malawi Stock Exchange (MSE), under the symbol: FMBCH

In December 2019, First Capital Bank Zambia received a four-year loan worth US$10 million from the Netherlands Development Finance Company (FMO), for onward lending to SMEs in Zambia.

== Ownership ==
The First Capital Bank Group maintains a 49 percent shareholding in First Capital Bank Zambia Limited.

== Branches ==
The bank's headquarters are located at: First Capital House, Stand No. 30078, Corner Chilubi Road and Church Road, Fairview Area, Lusaka, Zambia. The bank maintains brick-and-mortar branches as these locations:

1. Kamwala Branch: Plot. 228, Chilibulu Road, Lusaka
2. Kitwe Branch: Ground Floor, Mudzi House, Plot. 189, Kanyanta Avenue, Kitwe
3. Lusaka Main Branch: First Capital House, Stand No. 30078, Corner Chilubi Road and Church Road, Fairview Area Lusaka
4. Cairo Road Branch: Plot. 10460, Cairo Road at Malasha Road, Northend, Lusaka
5. Industrial Area Branch: Shop Number 1, Stand Number 8357, Radian Park, Ground Floor, Building Number 1, Industrial Area, Lusaka
6. Makeni Branch: Stand Number 26592C, Kafue Road, Makeni, Lusaka
7. Ndola Branch: Shop Number 1, Rekay Shopping Mall, Plot. 10068, President Avenue, Building Number 1, Ndola
8. Chinika Agency: Plot No 8087 Export Trading Company Building Katanga Road Chinika, Heavy Industrial Area

== Governance ==
Mark O'Donnell is the Chairman and Hitesh Anadkat is the Vice Chairman of the eight-person Board of Directors. Andre Potgieter serves as the Interim Chief Executive Officer of the bank.

== See also ==
- List of banks in Zambia
- List of companies of Zambia
- Economy of Zambia
