= List of banks in Malawi =

This is a list of commercial banks in Malawi, as updated in late 2024 by the Reserve Bank of Malawi.

== List of commercial banks ==
- CDH Investment Bank
- Ecobank Malawi, part of Ecobank Group
- FDH Bank
- First Capital Bank Malawi Limited, part of First Capital Bank Group
- National Bank of Malawi
- NBS Bank
- Standard Bank Malawi, part of Standard Bank Group
- Centenary Bank Malawi, part of Centenary Group

== See also ==
- Economy of Malawi
- List of companies based in Malawi
- List of banks in Africa
