= MacDonald Mafuta Mwale =

Malawian economist and central banker

Macdonald Mafuta Mwale
- Born: January 1, 1970 (age 56); Malawi
- Education: PhD in Economics (University of Aberdeen); MSc in Economics and Econometrics (University of Nottingham); Bachelor of Social Science in Economics (University of Malawi)
- Occupations: Economist, Central Banker
- Years active: 1990s–present
- Known for: Governor of the Reserve Bank of Malawi
- Title: Governor of the Reserve Bank of Malawi

Macdonald Mafuta Mwale (born January 1, 1970) is a Malawian economist who served as the Governor of the Reserve Bank of Malawi between 2025 and 2026. He has held various positions in Malawi's financial sector, including serving as the Secretary to the Treasury and Deputy Governor of the Reserve Bank of Malawi.

== Early life and education ==
Mwale was born in Malawi and pursued his higher education abroad. He holds a PhD in Economics from the University of Aberdeen, a Master of Science degree in Economics and Econometrics from the University of Nottingham, and a Bachelor of Social Science degree in Economics from the University of Malawi.

== Career ==
Mwale began his professional career in the 1990s and has since held several key roles in Malawi's financial institutions.

Malawi's Centre for Democracy and Economic Development Initiatives called for his resignation together with that of Jean Munyenyembe, the Accountant General, in July 2022 over an allowances scandal. Junior civil servants were investigated for corruption. The conclusion was that more senior people had to be involved and she and MacDonald Mafuta Mwale should take responsibility.

He served as the Director of Research and Statistics at the Reserve Bank of Malawi and later as the Secretary to the Treasury. In December 2024, he returned to the Reserve Bank of Malawi as Deputy Governor, and in January 2025, he was appointed Governor, succeeding Wilson Banda.
