= Robert Fumulani =

- Born: 1948; Zomba, Nyasaland (present-day Malawi)
- Died: 1998 (aged 49–50)
- Citizenship: Malawi
- Occupation: Singer

Robert Fumulani (1948 – 1998) was a Malawian musician, nightclub owner, and businessman. He led the Likhubula River Dance Band, known for its Afroma ("Afro-Malawi") funk rock reggae fusion.

== Biography ==
Fumulani has been described as "one of Malawi's most popular bandleaders of the late 1980s and 1990s", and as "the blessed father of our national music". He was part of a generation of male singers whose lyrics were about life, but devoid of political content. In the 1980s he was a three-time winner of Malawi's "Entertainer of the Year" award.

His earnings from music went towards a number of business enterprises, including the Chileka nightclub, Likhubula Entertainment Centre.
