= National Bank of Malawi =

Commercial bank in Malawi

- Company type: Public
- Traded as: MSE: NBM
- Industry: Financial services
- Founded: 1971; 55 years ago
- Headquarters: Blantyre, Malawi
- Key people: Jimmy Lipunga; Chairman; Harold Jiya; Chief Executive Officer
- Products: Loans, Savings, Checking, Investments, Debit cards, Credit cards, Mortgages
- Revenue: ▲ Aftertax: US$22 million (MWK:15.97 billion) (2018)
- Total assets: US$579 million (MWK:417.33 billion) (2018)
- Number of employees: 1000+
- Website: www.natbank.co.mw

National Bank of Malawi (NBM) plc, is a commercial bank in Malawi. The bank is one of the commercial banks licensed by the Reserve Bank of Malawi, the central bank and national banking regulator.

== Location ==
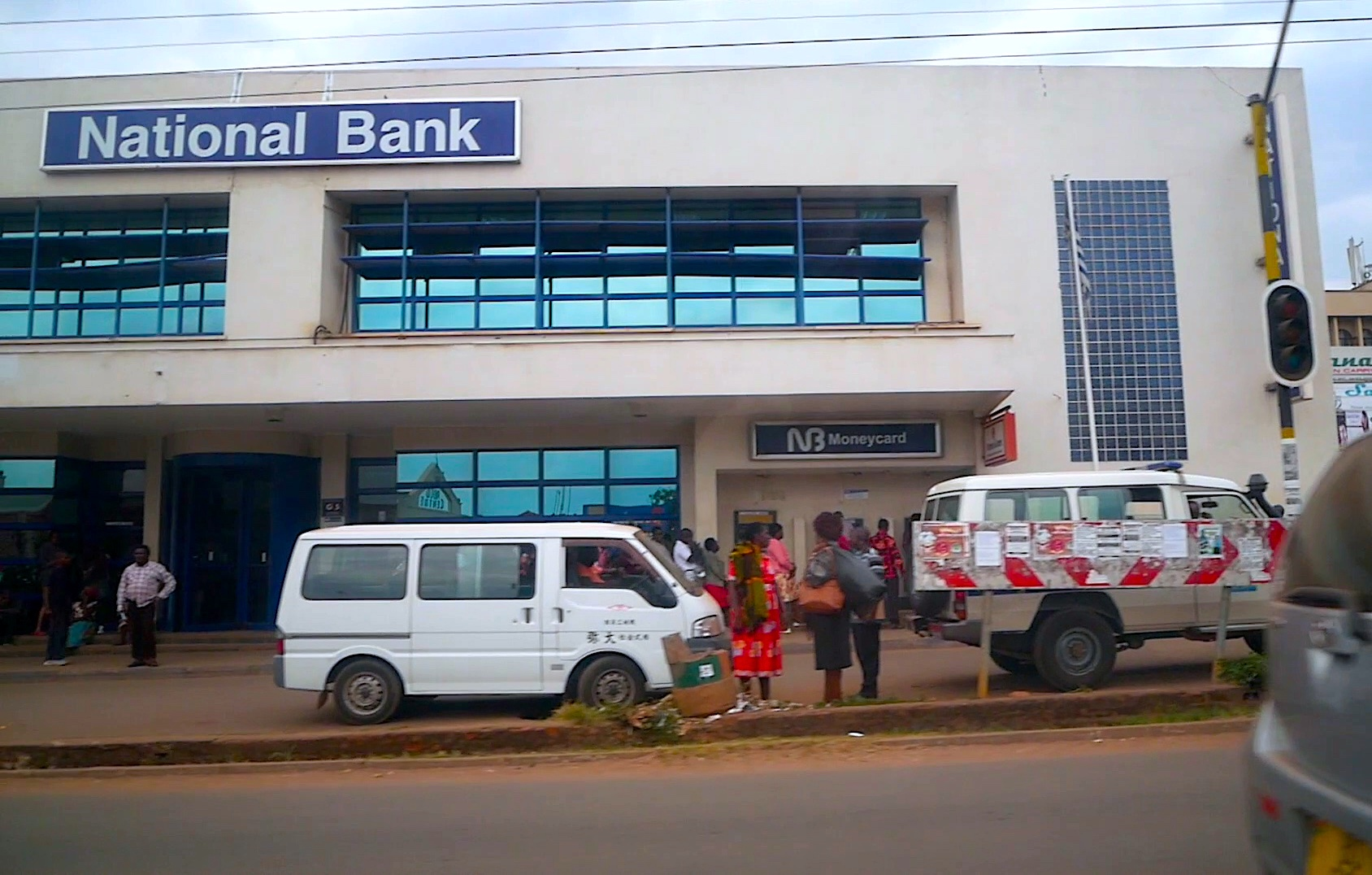
National Bank of Malawi in Lilongwe in 2018

The headquarters and main office of the National Bank of Malawi are located in Business Centre & Office Complex, at 7 Henderson Street, in the city of Blantyre, the largest city and financial capital of Malawi. The geographical coordinates of the headquarters of this bank are: 15°47'15.0"S, 35°00'13.0"E (Latitude:-15.787500; Longitude:35.003611).

== Overview ==
NBM is a large financial services institution, serving the banking needs of the people and businesses in Malawi. As of December 2018, the bank's total assets were valued at MWK:417.33 billion (approximately US$579 million), with shareholders' equity of MWK:88.4 billion (approximately US$123 million).

National Bank of Malawi maintains four subsidiary companies, two of which are wholly owned:

1. NBM Capital Markets Limited - 100% shareholding
2. NBM Pensions Administration Limited - 100% shareholding
3. NBM Development Bank Limited - 100% shareholding
4. Stockbrokers Malawi Limited - 75% shareholding
5. United General Insurance Limited - 31% shareholding.

== History ==
National Bank of Malawi traces its history from the 1890s when African Lakes Corporation established banking business in Nyasaland. In 1918, the National Bank of South Africa (now First National Bank) acquired the banking business of African Lakes Corporation in the colony. In 1925, National Bank of South Africa was merged with the Anglo-Egyptian Bank and the Colonial Bank in 1925 to form Barclays Bank (Dominion, Colonial and Overseas). Barclays thus inherited the National Bank of South Africa's business in the colony.

The current bank was established in 1971 when Standard Bank of Malawi, with the consent of the Government of Malawi, merged with Barclays Bank of Malawi. In July 1971, the merger was effected, with Standard and Barclays jointly owning 51% of the new bank i.e. 25.5% each. Press Holdings Limited, a private Malawian investment company owned 29% and Agricultural Development and Marketing Corporation (ADMARC), a Malawian parastatal, owned 20%. Over the years, both Standard Bank and Barclays Bank divested from NBM and Old Mutual Group, became an investor in the bank.

At one time Standard Chartered Bank was an investor in NBM, having acquired the assets which formerly belonged to Standard Bank. In August 2000, the stock of National Bank of Malawi became listed on the Malawi Stock Exchange, where it trades under the symbol NBM. At the time of listing, the bank issued 45 million ordinary shares.

== Ownership ==
The shares of stock of NBM are listed on the Malawi Stock Exchange, where they trade under the symbol: NBM. The stock of National Bank of Malawi is owned by corporate and individual investors. As of 31 December 2015, shareholding in the bank was:

National Bank of Malawi Stock Ownership
| Rank | Name of Owner | Percentage Ownership |
|---|---|---|
| 1 | Press Corporation Limited | 51.5 |
| 2 | Old Mutual Group | 25.1 |
| 3 | Members of the public | 21.6 |
| 4 | Employee Share Ownership Plan | 1.8 |
| 5 | TOTAL | 100.0 |

== Branch network ==
As of April 2018, National Bank of Malawi maintained over thirty branches, referred to as "service centers" by the bank.

== Governance ==
Jimmy Lipunga, a non-executive director, serves as the Chairman of the 12 member Board of Directors. The Managing Director and Chief Executive Officer is Harold Jiya, who is assisted by eleven other senior managers in overseeing the day-to-day activities of the bank.

== Acquisition and merger with Indebank ==
In July 2015, NBM acquired 97.05 percent of Indebank, a commercial bank in which the government of Malawi owned a 40 percent stake. NBM paid MWK:6.5 billion (approximately US$9.1 million). For the one-year up to 1 July 2016, the operations of Indenbank were integrated into NBM, with closure of some bank branches, where the two institutions' service centers were in close proximity.

== See also ==
- List of banks in Malawi
- Economy of Malawi
- Reserve Bank of Malawi
- Malawi Stock Exchange
