= First Capital Bank Mozambique =

Commercial bank in Mozambique

Coordinates: 25°58′37″S 32°34′47″E

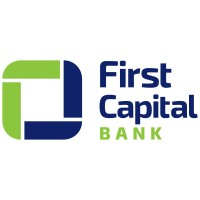
- Company type: Public company
- Industry: Financial services
- Founded: 2010; 16 years ago
- Headquarters: Maputo, Mozambique
- Key people: Hitesh Anadkat (Chairman), João Rodrigues (Chief Executive Officer)
- Products: Loans, Savings, Checking, Investments, Debit Cards, Mortgages
- Revenue: ▲Aftertax: MZN:33,366,951 (US$500,000+) (June 2019)
- Total assets: MZN:4,316,793,808 (US$65.2 million) (June 2019)
- Number of employees: 94 (2018)
- Parent: FMB Capital Holdings
- Website: www.firstcapitalbank.co.mz

First Capital Bank Mozambique (FCBM) is a commercial bank in Mozambique. It is licensed by the Bank of Mozambique, the central bank and national banking regulator.

FCBM is a subsidiary of FMBCapital Holdings Plc, a financial services conglomerate, based in Mauritius, whose shares of stock are listed on the Malawi Stock Exchange and has subsidiaries in Botswana, Malawi, Mozambique, Zambia and Zimbabwe.

The bank serves corporations, small and medium enterprises and individuals in Mozambique. As of June 2019, the bank's total assets were MZN:4,316,793,808 (US$65.2 million), with shareholders' equity of MZN:870,972,962 (US$13.2 million). As of December 2018, the bank served over 16,000 customers at 4 branches, one service centre, 6 ATMs and employed 94 staff members.

== History ==
The bank was established in 2010 as International Commercial Bank Mozambique. In 2013, First Merchant Bank of Malawi successfully acquired the subsidiaries of International Commercial Bank in Malawi, Mozambique and Zambia. Although the banking business of ICB Malawi was not viable, FMB was able to enter into the other two countries through the acquisition.

In December 2017, First Capital Bank Mozambique became a subsidiary of First Merchant Bank Capital Holdings Plc, of Mauritius, whose shares trade on the Malawi Stock Exchange (MSE), under the symbol: FMBCH

== Ownership ==
FMBCapital Holdings Plc maintains an 80 percent shareholding in First Capital Bank Mozambique Limited.

== See also ==
- List of banks in Mozambique
- List of companies of Mozambique
- Economy of Mozambique
