= First Capital Bank Botswana Limited =

Commercial bank in Botswana

Coordinates: 24°38′56″S 25°54′14″E

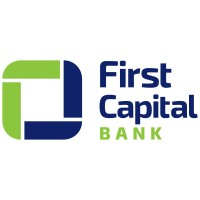
- Formerly: Capital Bank
- Type: Public
- Industry: Banking
- Founded: 2008; 18 years ago
- Headquarters: First Capital House, 2nd Commercial Road, Gaborone, Botswana
- Key people: Hitesh Anadkat; Chairman; Reinette van der Merwe; Chief Executive Officer
- Products: Loans, Savings, Checking, Investments, Debit Cards, Mortgages
- Total assets: BWP:3.9 billion (US$322 million) (2021)
- Parent: FMBCapital Holdings
- Website: https://www.firstcapitalbank.co.bw/

First Capital Bank Botswana Limited, formerly known as Capital Bank, is a commercial bank in Botswana, licensed by the Bank of Botswana, the central bank and national banking regulator. It is a subsidiary of FMBCapital Holdings Plc, a Mauritius-based financial services conglomerate, whose shares of stock are listed on the Malawi Stock Exchange and has subsidiaries in Botswana, Malawi, Mozambique, Zambia and Zimbabwe.

== Location ==
The headquarters and main branch of the bank are located at First Capital House, 2nd Commercial Road, in Gaborone, the capital and largest city in Botswana. The geographical coordinates of the bank's headquarters are: 24°38'56.0"S, 25°54'14.0"E (Latitude:-24.648889; Longitude:25.903889).

== Overview ==
As of December 2018, the bank had total assets of BWP:2,880,502,881 (US$241 million), with shareholders' equity of BWP:196,059,009 (US$16.5 million).

== History ==
The bank began operations in 2008, following the issuance of its banking license by the Bank of Botswana, the national banking regulator. Capital Bank introduced Internet banking in 2009 and Visa Debit Cards in 2010. In 2019, the bank successfully acquired the assets and liabilities of the now former Bank of India (Botswana) Limited, another commercial bank.

== Ownership ==
As of December 2021, the major shareholders of First Capital Bank Botswana, were as laid out in the table below:

Major Shareholders of First Capital Bank Botswana Limited
Rank	Shareholder	Domicile	Percentage Ownership
1	FMBCapital Holdings Plc	Mauritius	38.60
2	Everglades Holdings (Pty) Limited	Botswana	32.96
3	Premier Capital Limited	Mauritius	16.32
4	Prime Bank Kenya	Kenya	6.62
5	The Anadkat Family	United Kingdom	5.50
	Total		100.0

== Branches ==
As of April 2020, First Capital Bank Botswana maintains its headquarters at First Capital House, Plot. 74768, 2nd Commercial Road, New CBD, Gaborone, Botswana. The networked branches of the bank are located at the following locations.

1. Main Branch: Capital House, Plot. 17954, Old Lobatse Road, Gaborone
2. Mogoditshane Branch: Plot. 4216, Supa Save Complex, Along Molepolole Road, Mogoditshane
3. Broadhurst Branch: First Capital House, Plot. 74768, 2nd Commercial Road, New CBD, Gaborone
4. Francistown Branch: Plot. 448, Blue Jacket Street, Francistown.
5. Maun Branch: Plot 17396 Nkwe road Maun industrial area

== Governance ==
The chairman of the six-person board of directors is Hitesh Anadkat. The chief executive officer of the bank, since January 2021, is Reinette van der Merwe.

== See also ==
- List of banks in Botswana
- Economy of Botswana
- List of companies of Botswana
