= Telekom Networks Malawi =

Malawian telecommunications company

Coordinates: 15°47′08″S 35°00′26″E

Telekom Networks Malawi plc
- Type: Public
- Traded as: MSE: TNM
- Industry: Telecommunications
- Founded: 1995; 31 years ago
- Headquarters: Fifth Floor, Livingstone Towers, Glyn Jones Road, Blantyre, Malawi
- Key people: Ted Sauti-Phiri; Chairman; Michel Antoine Hebert; Chief Executive Officer
- Revenue: ▲MWK: 222.90 billion (2025)
- Net income: ▲MWK: 21.27 billion (2025)
- Total assets: ▲MWK: 120.53 billion (2020)
- Total equity: ▲MWK: 43.91 billion (2020)
- Number of employees: 1000 (2025)
- Parent: Press Corporation Limited
- Website: www.tnm.co.mw

Telekom Networks Malawi plc (TNM), is a telecommunications service provider in Malawi. Established in 1995, it is the oldest telecommunications company in the country. The telco is a subsidiary of Press Corporation Limited, the largest business conglomerate in Malawi.

TNM is Malawi is a mobile operator that offers 4G and 5G services and offers a full range of prepaid and postpaid voice, data, and digital solutions to customers nationwide.

== Location ==
The headquarters of the company are located on the Fifth Floor, Livingstone Towers, Glyn Jones Road, in the city of Blantyre, Malawi's business capital. The geographical coordinates of the company headquarters are:15°47'08.0"S, 35°00'26.0"E (Latitude:-15.785556; Longitude:35.007222).

== Overview ==
Telekom Networks Malawi is a leading telecommunications network provider in the country. As of December 2020, the telco had assets worth MWK:120,528,540,000 (US$155.6 million), with shareholders equity worth MWK:43,905,850,000 (US$56.7 million). At that time, the company had in excess of 4 million customers, through 26 customer-service stores throughout the country.

== History ==
Telekom Networks Malawi (TNM) was established in 1995 as a joint venture between Telekom Malaysia (60 percent) and Malawi Postal and Telecommunications Corporation (MPTC) (40 percent). MPTC was owned by the government of Malawi. Later, MPTC was unbundled into (a) Malawi Posts Corporation (MPC) and (b) Malawi Telecommunications Limited (MTL). The shares of stock of Telekom Networks Malawi were listed on the Malawi Stock Exchange in 2008. Telekom Malaysia sold its 60% majority stake in TNM, and the enterprise is now wholly Malawian-owned.

== Ownership ==
Telekom Networks Malawi (TNM), company number 4029, was the pioneer mobile network in Malawi, and it is listed on the Malawi Stock Exchange, where it trades under the symbol TNM. As of 31 December 2018, the major shareholders in the stock of TNM are as illustrated in the table below.

Shareholders In The Stock of Telekom Networks Malawi As At 31 December 2018
Rank	Shareholder	Percentage	Notes
1	Press Corporation Limited	41.31	
2	Old Mutual Life Assurance Company Malawi Limited	24.09	
3	Magni Holdings Limited	5.01	
4	NICO Life Insurance Company Limited	4.88	
5	Livingstone Holdings Limited	1.87	
6	Magetsi Pension Fund	1.49	
7	Uniloy Holdings Limited	1.26	
8	Uco Holdings Limited	1.19	
9	Others	18.90	
	Total	100.00	

== Governance ==
The board of directors is chaired by Ted Sauti-Phiri, with Michel Antoine Hebert as Chief Executive Officer.

== Sponsorship ==
TNM was the proud sponsor of the TNM Super League, Malawi’s premier football competition contested by 16 teams from across the nation. From 2007 until 2025, this partnership stood as a cornerstone of Malawi’s football journey.

Over nearly two decades, TNM’s sponsorship provided vital support from football equipment and cash subventions to clubs, to administration fees for the Super League of Malawi (SULOM), and awards recognizing outstanding players, teams, and even media personalities who championed the league.

TNM’s legacy in the Super League lives on in the growth of Malawi’s football and the social bonds it strengthened.

== See also ==
- First Capital Bank Malawi Limited
