= Centenary Group =

Ugandan conglomerate

- Company type: Private Conglomerate
- Industry: Financial services ICT services Social services
- Founded: December 23, 1983; 42 years ago
- Headquarters: Kampala, Uganda
- Key people: John Ddumba Ssentamu; Group Chairman
- Products: Banking, data processing and storage
- Website: Homepage

The Centenary Group of Companies, commonly referred to as the Centenary Group, is a privately owned conglomerate in Uganda. The anchor company in the group is Centenary Bank, the second-largest commercial bank in Uganda, based on assets. As of 31 December 2021 Centenary Bank had assets valued at USh4.8 trillion (US$1.359 billion).

== Overview ==
As of October 2023, Centenary Group is involved in financial services, information and communications technology and the delivery of social services. At that time, the Group's assets were valued at UGX6.2 trillion (US$1.631 billion), with shareholders' equity in the group in excess of USh789.52 billion (US$222.78 million). It is the largest indigenous Ugandan financial services conglomerate.

In December 2023, Centenary Group broke ground in the city of Masaka for the construction of a Tier 3 green data center. This is the country's first such facility outside the capital city of Kampala.

== History ==
Started in 1983 as Centenary Rural Development Trust (CRDT), Centenary bank started serving customers in that role in 1985. In 1993 the Bank of Uganda awarded a commercial banking license to CRDT, transforming it into Centenary Bank.

In March 2019 the board of directors of Centenary Bank resolved to form a group structure. With consent of the Bank of Uganda (BoU), Centenary Group was established on 25 October 2019. On 6 November 2019, "the group formed a banking subsidiary named Centenary Rural Development Bank Limited" (CRDBL). The BoU issued a commercial banking license to (CRDBL), on 16 March 2020, effective 1 July 2020. On that date Centenary Group transferred its banking business to CRDBL.

== Subsidiary companies ==
As of May 2023, the companies of the Centenary Group included the following:

1. Centenary Bank Uganda Limited, a large commercial bank in Uganda.

2. Centenary Technology Services Limited (Cente-Tech), an information and communications company. Responsible for the ICT functions within the group. In the process of developing a Level 3 data centre in the city of Masaka, Uganda.

3. Centenary Foundation, a non-government non-profit organisation, charged with promoting and executing the group's social programs.

4. Centenary Bank Malawi. A commercial bank in Malawi, majority owned by the Centenary Group of Uganda with minority shareholding by the Roman Catholic Archdiocese of Lilongwe.

== See also ==
- List of conglomerates in Uganda
- List of conglomerates in Africa
- Kampala Capital City Authority
