= Press Corporation Limited =

Malawian business conglomerate

Coordinates: 15°47′33″S 35°00′34″E

Press Corporation Plc
- Company type: Private: MSE: PCL
- Industry: Investments
- Founded: 1961; 65 years ago
- Headquarters: Third Floor, PCL House, Kaohsiung Road, Blantyre, Malawi
- Key people: Radson Mwadiwa; Chairman; Ronald Mangani; Group Chief Executive
- Products: Financial services, telecommunications, energy, retail, consumer products and real estate.
- Revenue: ▲Aftertax: MWK:126.3 billion (US$72.2 million) (2024)
- Total assets: MWK:1.129 trillion (US$645.2 million) (2024)
- Website: https://www.presscorp.com/

Press Corporation Limited, also Press Corporation Plc, is a business conglomerate, partly owned by Press Trust, a sovereign trust fund, of the government of Malawi, that is outside of the direct control of the Malawian government. Press Corporation Plc is the largest conglomerate in Malawi, and has ownership in 15 companies in Malawi, including 8 subsidiaries, 4 joint ventures and one associate company.

== Location ==
The headquarters of the company are located on the 3rd Floor, Press Corporation Plc House, Kaohsiung Road, Blantyre, Malawi. The geographical coordinates of Press Corporation's headquarters are:15°47'33.0"S, 35°00'34.0"E (Latitude:-15.792500; Longitude:35.009444).

== Overview ==
Press Corporation Plc is a business conglomerate that serves as a holding company to fifteen Malawian businesses. It is the largest business conglomerate in the country. As of 31 December 2024, Press Corporation Plc had MWK: 1,128,974,000,000

(US$645.2 million) worth of assets under management.[1]

== History ==
The company was founded in 1961, as Malawi Press Limited, a publishing Company. The company expanded rapidly, and by 1979 it had stakes in 17 subsidiary companies and 23 associated companies. The rapid expansion however, had been funded by excessive short-term borrowing and soon faced a financial crisis.

In 1983 company was restructured on the orders of the then president of the country, Hastings Kamuzu Banda. After discussions with the International Monetary Fund and the World Bank, a new company, Press Group Limited, was incorporated on 27 February 1984 in Blantyre as a holding company. Press Corporation Limited was incorporated on the same day, as a 100 percent subsidiary of Press Group Limited.

Press Group Limited, is in turn owned by Press Trust, a sovereign charitable organization in Malawi, incorporated it on 5 March 1982.

== Subsidiaries ==
The list below outlines the subsidiary, joint venture and associate companies of Press Corporation Limited.

1. National Bank of Malawi: 51.5 percent shareholding.
2. Telekom Networks of Malawi Limited
3. Malawi Telecommunications Limited
4. Presscane Limited
5. People's Trading Centre Limited
6. Press Properties Limited
7. Manzini Limited
8. The Foods Company Limited
9. Open Connect Limited
10. Ethanol Company Limited
11. Castel Malawi Limited
12. Limbe Leaf Tobacco Company Limited
13. Sunbird Tourism Plc: 10 percent shareholding
14. Macsteel Malawi Limited (Joint venture between Press Corporation and Macsteel Service Centers of South Africa)
15. Press Corporation Limited/PUMA Energy International Joint Venture.

== Ownership ==
The shares of stock of Press Corporation Limited are listed on the Malawi Stock Exchange, where they trade under the symbol PCL. The table below illustrates the major shareholders in the stock of Press Corporation Plc, as at 31 December 2018.

Stock Ownership In Press Corporation Limited As of 31 December 2018
Rank	Shareholder	Percentage	Notes
1	Press Trust	45.45	
2	Public	19.83	
3	Deutsche Bank Trust Company America	18.88	
4	Old Mutual Life Assurance Company Limited	15.84	
	Total	100.00	

== Governance ==
Radson Mwadiwa is the chairman of the board of directors. Ronald Mangani serves as the Group Chief Executive of the conglomerate.

== See also ==
- List of companies of Ghana
- List of banks in Malawi
- Economy of Malawi
