= Swift Air Malawi =

Malawian airline (2009–2012)

Swift Air
IATA	ICAO	Call sign
—	—	-
- Founded: September 2009; 17 years ago
- Ceased operations: July 2012; 14 years ago
- Headquarters: Lilongwe, Malawi
- Key people: Louise Hahn-Perepeczko (CEO)

Swift Air Limited was an airline based in Lilongwe, Malawi. It was a privately owned airline that operated regional passenger services. Its main base was at Kamuzu International Airport.

== History ==
Swift Air was incorporated in September 2009, acquired flying licences in November 2010, and began operations on 28 February 2011. It concentrated on domestic flights between the business and mining hubs of the country, and performed a regular shuttle service to Johannesburg O. R. Tambo International Airport.

In May 2012 the airline ceased operations due to unpaid debts, believed to be in millions of kwacha. All 24 employees of the company ceased reporting for work and the Head office in Lilongwe remained closed.

== Fleet ==
Swift Air Malawi operated Douglas DC-9, Embraer 120 and Beechcraft 1900D aircraft until its closure in May 2012. All have either been returned to their respective owners or grounded as a result of the financial problems.

== Destinations ==
Prior to its grounding, Swift Air operated domestically between Lilongwe, Blantyre, Mzuzu, Karonga with a single regional flight operated to Johannesburg, South Africa.
