= ICB Banking Group =

Financial company in Switzerland

- Company type: Private:LON: ICB
- Industry: Banking
- Founded: 1994
- Products: Financial services

ICB Banking Group also referred to as Swiss Finance Lexomburg AG or ICB Financial Group, but commonly known as International Commercial Bank (ICB), is an International financial services provider based in Schindellegi, Switzerland, with subsidiaries in Eastern Europe, Africa and Asia. The parent company of the group was known as ICB Financial Group Holdings AG.

The company was delisted from AIM in 2012.

== History ==
The group began banking operations in 1994 when it was granted a license to operate a bank in Hungary. Since then, the ICB Banking Group has established or acquired commercial banks in Eastern Europe, Africa and Asia. As of May 2009, the group operates banks in thirteen (13) countries on three (3) continents.

The group began their operations in Africa in 1996 in Ghana and today has a presence in nine (9) African countries. In 2003, the group entered the Asian market by acquiring an indirect stake of 11.3% in Bank Internasional Indonesia, one of the largest banks in Indonesia. Through subsequent acquisitions and start-ups, ICB today operates in three (3) Asian countries.

In 2004, the individual ownerships of the ICB Banking Group were incorporated under the umbrella of ICB Financial Group Holdings AG, a Swiss based holding company. On 17 May 2007, ICB Financial Group Holdings AG was listed on AIM market of the London Stock Exchange.

ICB Bank Malawi was established in 2008. In 2010, ICB Banking Group disposed of its shareholding interest in ICB Islamic Bank in Bangladesh, for a consideration of US$55 million in cash. Also in 2010, ICB Bank Zambia was established.

In 2013, ICB sold the entirety of its Malawian operation, and controlling stakes of its operations in Zambia and Mozambique to southern African banking group FMB: ICB Malawi did not meet the minimum regulatory capital and other liquidity requirements, meant to safeguard customers. The motive of FMB in acquiring ICB was not because of the viability of the business in Malawi but because it was part of the transaction in the two countries where FMB would like to open its operations through the acquisition.

== See also ==
- List of banks in Africa
- List of banks in Asia
