= Limbe, Malawi =

Limbe
- Neighborhood
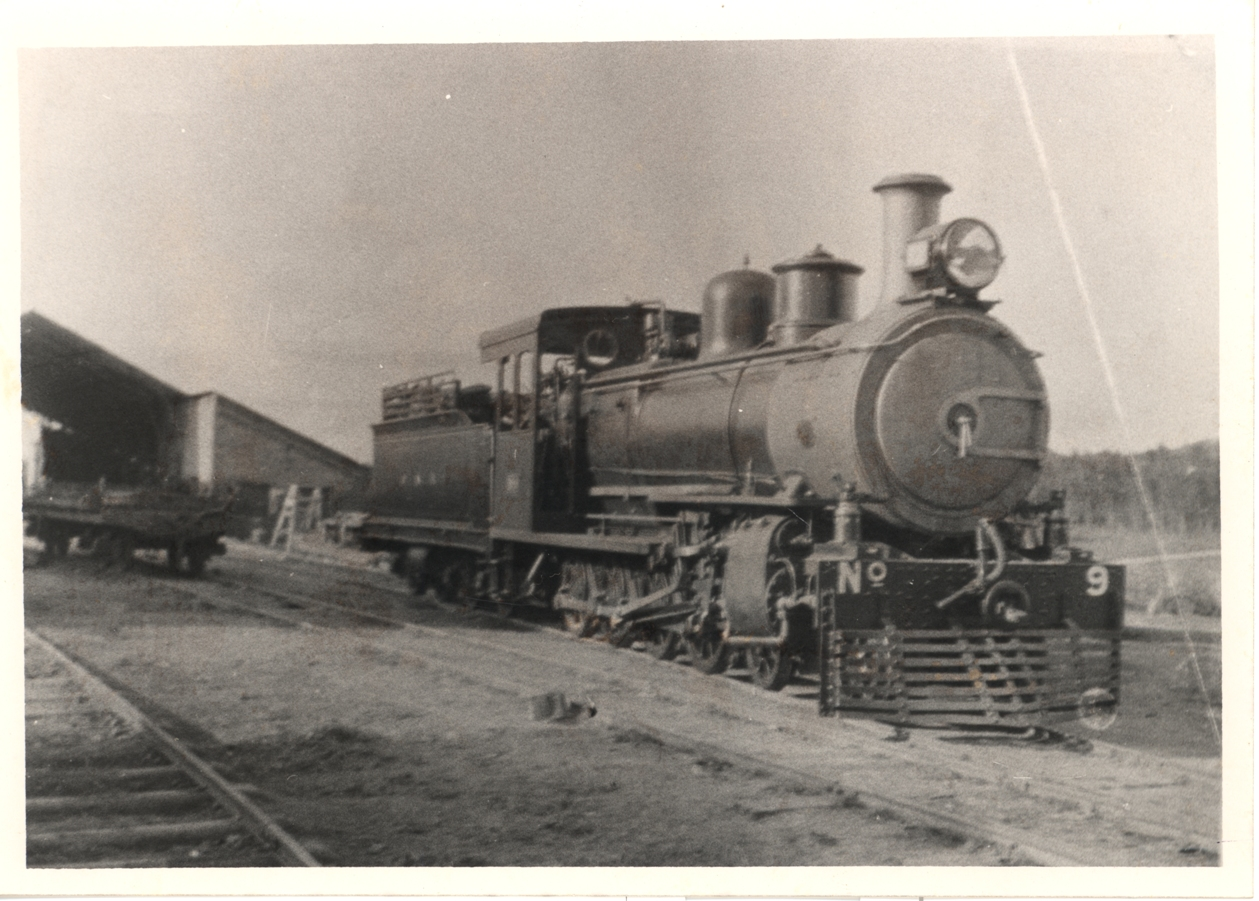
- Locomotive Number 9 at Limbe, May 1924

- Location in Malawi
- Coordinates: 15°49′0″S 35°3′0″E
- Country: Malawi
- Region: Southern Region
- District: Blantyre District
- Time zone: +2
- Climate: Cwa

Limbe is a neighborhood located in the city of Blantyre, in Malawi. It is the operational headquarters and workshop for Malawi Railways.

== Overview ==
Limbe is 11 kilometres (7 miles) east of center of Blantyre and was founded in 1909. Blantyre merged with Limbe in 1956.

== Economy ==
The first branch of the Commercial Bank of Malawi was opened in Limbe on 11 April 1970. Limbe is home to Malawi Pharmacies Limited and Illovo Sugar Malawi. Limbe is the site to many of the industries in Blantyre District. Limbe is known for Indian (East Asian) traders but there has also been an influx of Chinese owned businesses growing in the area.

== Culture ==
Limbe has a strong Asian Malawian culture and Yao culture. The town is home to a transport museum.

== Sports ==
Limbe is also the headquarter of Hockey Association of Malawi (HAM).

== See also ==
- Chiwembe
- Railway stations in Malawi
