= Malawi Stock Exchange =

Stock exchange in Blantyre, Malawi

- Type: Stock Exchange
- Location: Blantyre, Malawi
- Founded: November 11, 1996
- Key people: Chairman; James Khomba; Director; Wilson Banda
- Currency: Kwacha (K)
- No. of listings: 16
- Market cap: US$3.26 billion (December, 2022)
- Indices: Malawi All Share Index; Malawi Domestic Share Index; Malawi Foreign Share Index
- Website: mse.co.mw

The Malawi Stock Exchange (MSE) is a Malawian stock market based in Blantyre, Malawi.

== Overview ==
The Malawi Stock Exchange was inaugurated in March 1995 and opened for business for the first time on 11 November 1996, under the aegis of the Reserve Bank of Malawi, with 2,300 Malawian citizens buying shares in the first company to be listed – Malawi's largest insurance firm, the National Insurance Company.

International Finance Corporation, a World Bank affiliate, and the Financierings Maatschappij Ontwikkelingslanden, a Dutch development bank with close ties to the Dutch Ministry for Development Co-operation, provided 40% of the $500,000 required for establishing the stock market in Blantyre, and the European Union sponsored seminars and publicity campaigns. The exchange operates in terms of the Capital Markets Development Act of 1990 and the Capital Market Development Regulations of 1992. It has a supervisory committee which comprises representatives of the central bank, the government and the private sector. It is a member of the African Stock Exchanges Association.

The MSE has a modest market listing. More stringent listing rules are currently being prepared. Membership of the Exchange is corporate and individual.

== Market listing ==
As of December 2024

| Number | Symbol | Company | Notes | Market Capitalisation (MK) |
|---|---|---|---|---|
| 1 | AIRTEL | Airtel Malawi plc | Telecommunication | 1,066,780,000,000 |
| 2 | BHL | Blantyre Hotels plc | Lodging, Resorts | 12,218,372,758 |
| 3 | FDHB | FDH Bank plc | Banking, Finance | 1,023,767,985,938 |
| 4 | FMBCH | FMB Capital Holdings plc | Banking, Finance | 1,364,328,750,000 |
| 5 | ICON | Icon Properties plc | Real Estate | 120,574,000,000 |
| 6 | ILLOVO | Illovo Sugar Malawi plc | Sugar | 966,781,359,800 |
| 7 | MPICO | Malawi Properties Investment Company plc | Real Estate | 42,582,819,434 |
| 8 | NBM | National Bank of Malawi plc | Banking, Finance | 1,616,555,031,495 |
| 9 | NBS | NBS Bank plc | Banking, Finance | 442,378,044,378 |
| 10 | NICO | NICO Holdings Plc | Finance, Mortgages, Insurance | 421,524,198,126 |
| 11 | NITL | National Investment Trust plc | Investments | 59,400,000,000 |
| 12 | OMU | Old Mutual Limited | Banking, Finance | 26,973,452,875 |
| 13 | PCL | Press Corporation plc | Food Distribution, Aquaculture, Real Estate, Beverages, Tourism, Telecommunication | 300,613,093,720 |
| 14 | STANDARD | Standard Bank Malawi plc | Banking, Finance | 1,408,046,518,906 |
| 15 | SUNBIRD | Sunbird Tourism plc | Tourism, Hotels, Resorts, Real Estate | 62,798,129,981 |
| 16 | TNM | Telekom Networks Malawi plc | Mobile Telephony | 256,633,902,000 |

== Trading times ==
Trading takes place from Monday to Friday with the following times:

- Pre-Open: 09:00 - 09:30
- Open: 09:30 - 14:30
- Close: 14:30 - 15:00
- Post-Close: 15:00 - 17:00

== See also ==
- Economy of Malawi
- List of stock exchanges
- List of African stock exchanges
