= Reserve Bank of Malawi =

Central bank of Malawi

- Logo of Reserve Bank of Malawi

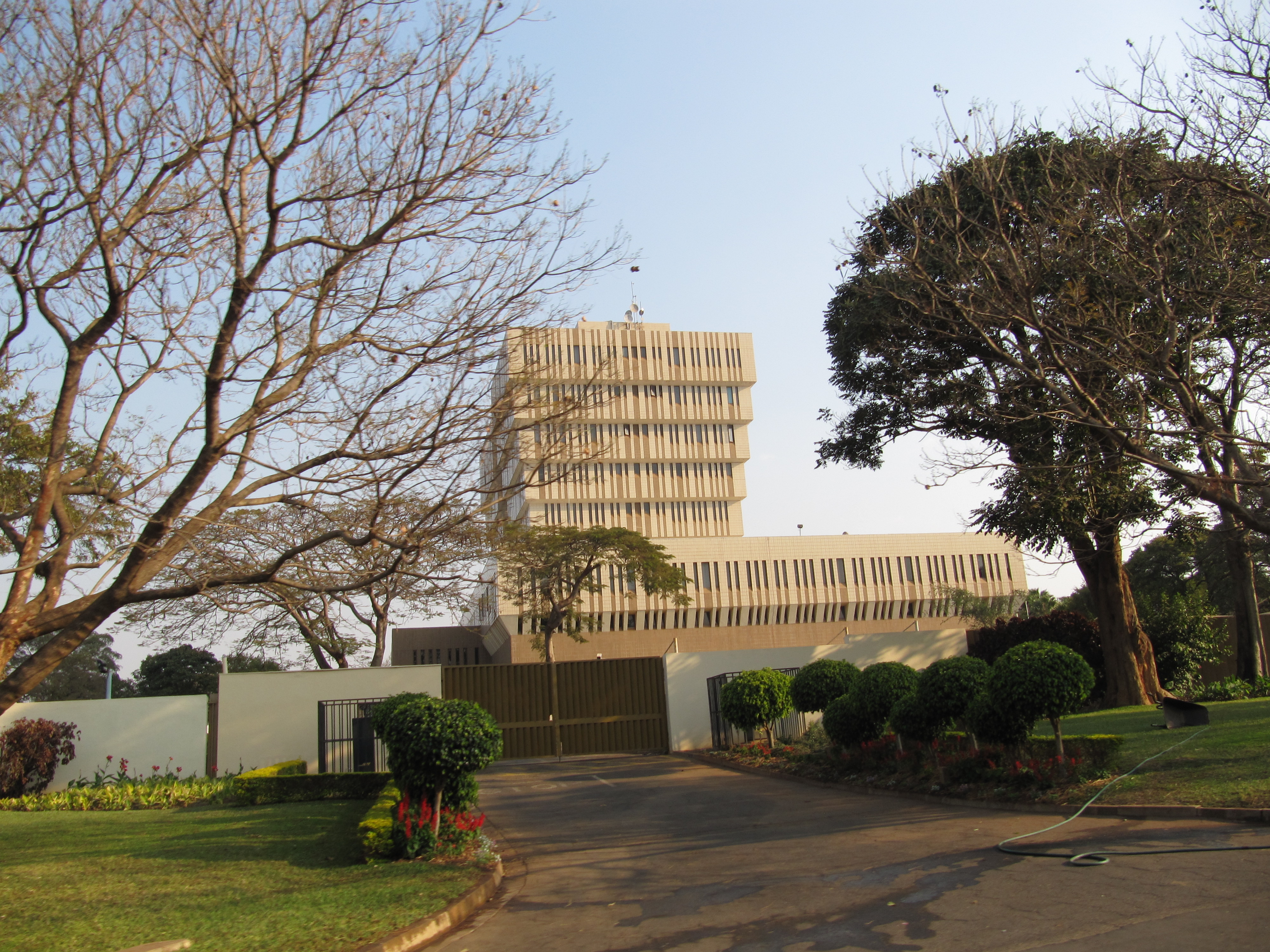
- Reserve Bank of Malawi, Headquarters in Lilongwe, August 2012
- Central bank of: Malawi
- Established: July 1964
- Ownership: 100% state ownership
- Governor: George Partridge
- Currency: Malawian kwacha MWK (ISO 4217)
- Website: www.rbm.mw

The Reserve Bank of Malawi is the central bank of Malawi established in the year 1964 located in Lilongwe. The current governor is George Partridge.

The Bank is active in promoting financial inclusion policy and is a leading member of the Alliance for Financial Inclusion. It is also one of the original 17 regulatory institutions to make specific national commitments to financial inclusion under the Maya Declaration during the 2011 Global Policy Forum held in Mexico.

The Reserve Bank of Malawi is the only institution permitted to issue the Malawian kwacha, which replaced the Malawian pound in 1971.

== Governors ==
- Alan G. Perrin, 1964-1968
- D. E. Thomson, 1968-1971
- John Tembo, 1971-1984
- Chakakala Chaziya, 1984-1986
- Stephen Chimwemwe Hara, 1986-1988
- Hans Joachim Lesshafft, 1988-1992
- Francis Perekamoya, 1992-1995
- Mathews Chikaonda, 1995-2000
- Elias Ngalande, 2000-2005
- Victor Mbewe, 2005-2009
- Perks Ligoya, 2009-2012
- Charles Chuka, 2012-2017
- Dalitso Kabambe, 2017-2020
- Wilson Banda, 2020-2025
- MacDonald Mafuta Mwale, 2025-2026
- George Partridge, 2026-

== See also ==
- Economy of Malawi
- List of central banks of Africa
- List of central banks
- List of financial supervisory authorities by country
