= Eastmatt Supermarkets =

Supermarket chain in Kenya

Coordinates: 00°36′20″S 36°00′55″E

- Type: Private
- Industry: Retail trade
- Founded: 1990
- Headquarters: Industrial area, Kenya
- Key people: Kamau Chege; Executive Chairman
- Products: Supermarkets
- Number of employees: 500+ (2023)
- Subsidiaries: In Kenya
- Website: https://www.eastmatt.com/

Eastmatt Supermarkets, often referred to simply as Eastmatt, is a supermarket chain in Kenya, the largest economy in the East African Community.

== Location ==
The head office of Eastmatt Supermarkets is located in Nairobi, Nairobi County in Kenya.

== Overview ==
The supermarket chain owns and operates supermarkets in Kenya. Eastmatt is the leading tier 2 supermarket chain in the country.

== Branches ==
As of December 2023, the supermarket chain operates a total of 11 branches at the following locations with the latest branch - Utalii, opened in December 2025.: It does not have any branches outside Kenya.

== Ownership ==
Eastmatt is a wholly Kenyan, privately held company. The detailed shareholding in the stock of the company is not widely publicly known.

== Recent developments ==
The supermarket chain which started operations in 1990, in a small upcountry town, has since 2014, began an aggressive expansion push into the central business district of Nairobi, the largest city in Kenya, and the capital of that country. It positions its stores near public transport hubs, targeting the large number of working people who use public means to commute to work.

== See also ==
- Kenya Supermarkets
- Maathai
- Naivas
- Nakumatt
- Tuskys
- Uchumi
- Ukwala
- Kenya Economy
