= Botswana Insurance Holdings =

Insurance firm based in Botswana

Botswana Insurance Holdings Ltd
- Type: Public
- Traded as: BwSE: BIHL
- Industry: Insurance, asset management, wealth management, investments,
- Founded: 1975; 51 years ago
- Headquarters: Gaborone, Botswana
- Number of employees: 342 (2020)
- Parent: Sanlam
- Website: www.bihl.co.bw

Botswana Insurance Holdings Limited (BIHL Group) is an investment, retirement, and insurance group that maintains its headquarters in Botswana and operates through three subsidiaries and holds a stake in a number of associate companies. BIHL Group was established in 1975 and has been listed on the Botswana Stock Exchange since 1991.

== Subsidiaries and investments ==
The companies that compose the BIHL include, but are not limited, to the following:

1. Botswana Life Insurance Limited – Gaborone, Botswana – 100% Shareholding – A long term insurance service provider in Botswana.
2. Botswana Insurance Fund Management Limited (BIFM) – Gaborone, Botswana – 100% Shareholding – A pension fund manager in Botswana.
3. Botswana Insurance Company Limited – Gaborone, Botswana – 50% Shareholding – A short term insurance provider in Botswana.
4. African Life Financial Services – Lusaka, Zambia – 49% Shareholding – The company is involved in the provision of asset management and employee benefits administration. It is ranked as Zambia's largest private investment managers.
5. Funeral Services Group – Gaborone, Botswana – 37.59% Shareholding – This is a funeral services provider. The company, through its subsidiaries in Botswana, South Africa, Zambia and Zimbabwe, engages in the manufacturing and retail of coffins and caskets, provision of funeral related services and provision of funeral insurance.
6. Letshego Holdings Limited – Gaborone, Botswana – 39.60% Shareholding through Botswana Life Insurance Limited and Botswana Insurance Fund Management Limited – A microfinance holding company operating in Botswana, Eswatini, Ghana, Kenya, Mozambique, Namibia, Nigeria, Rwanda, Uganda and Tanzania. The company is listed on the Botswana Stock Exchange.
7. Nico Holdings Plc – Blantyre, Malawi – 25.10% Shareholding – The group operates insurance and investments businesses in Malawi, Tanzania, Uganda, Zambia and Mozambique, as well as a banking business through NBS Bank. The company is listed on the Malawi Stock Exchange.

== Ownership ==
BIHL's shares are publicly listed and traded on the BSE, under the symbol: BIHL. As of 31 December 2020, shareholding in the group's stock was as depicted in the table below:

Botswana Insurance Holdings Limited Stock Ownership
Rank	Name of Owner	% Ownership
1	SanlamAllianz	57.92
2	Botswana Public Officers Pension Fund	20.72
3	Motor Vehicle Assurance Fund	4.00
4	Others	17.36
	Total	100.00

== See also ==
- Botswana Stock Exchange
- BSE DCI
