= List of supermarket chains in Spain =

This is a list of supermarket chains in Spain.

== Hypermarkets ==
- Alcampo (Auchan)
- Carrefour
- Eroski
- Esclat (Bon Preu Group)
- Hipercor

== Supermarkets ==
- Ahorramás
- Aldi
- Alimerka
- Alcampo
- Barcelona Market
- BonÀrea
- BonPreu (Bon Preu Group)
- BM
- Caprabo
- Captura
- Carrefour City
- Carrefour
- Claudio
- Condis
- Consum
- Costco
- Coviran
- Dia
- DinoSol
- E.Leclerc
- El Jamón
- Familia
- Froiz
- Gadis
- Jodofi
- Keisy
- Hiber
- Iceland
- IFA
- Lidl
- Lupa
- Makro
- masymas
- Mercadona
- Pepe La Sal
- Repsol
- Sánchez Romero
- Simply Market
- Sorli
- Spar
- Supercor
- SuperSol
- Sabeco
- Tu Alteza
- Único
