= DKL =

DKL may refer to:

- Donkey Kong Land, a 1995 video game for the Game Boy
- Nickname for Deokali, industrial area in Uttar Pradesh, India
- Dunlop Kenya Limited, original name for Olympia Capital Holdings, a holding company in India
- Code for Daud Khel Junction railway station, Pakistan
- The Kullback–Leibler divergence ($D_\text{KL}$), a measure of difference between probability distributions.
