= Ukwala Supermarkets =

Kenyan supermarket chain

Coordinates: 01°17′17″S 36°49′45″E

- Type: Private
- Industry: Retail trade
- Defunct: December 2024
- Fate: Liquidated due to insolvency after accumulating heavy debts, with some assets sold before the company was formally dissolved.
- Headquarters: Nairobi, Kenya
- Products: Supermarkets
- Number of employees: 566 (2016)
- Subsidiaries: In Kenya

Ukwala Supermarkets, often called Ukwala, was a supermarket chain in Kenya, with the largest economy in the East African Community. The supermarket chain was a subsidiary of Choppies, a retail conglomerate based in Gaborone, Botswana.

== Location ==
The head office of Ukwala was on Haile Selassie Avenue, in Nairobi, the largest city in Kenya and the capital of that country.

== Overview ==
Ukwala owned and operated supermarkets in Kenya. It was the fifth largest of the major supermarket chains in Kenya, behind Tuskys, Uchumi and Naivas.

== Branches ==
As of January 2018, Ukwala maintained eleven branches in Kenya. Another three new stores are in the pipeline for 2018. Ukwala did not have any branches outside of Kenya.

== Ownership ==
Ukwala is 75 percent owned by Choppies, a Botswana-based supermarket chain, whose stock is listed on the Botswana Stock Exchange and Johannesburg Stock Exchange, with 157 African stores. Export Trading Group, a Tanzanian company, hold the remaining 25 percent shareholding.

== Recent developments ==
In April 2013, Tuskys Supermarkets, a rival chain, entered into a private deal with Ukwala, whereby Tuskys would buy six Ukwala stores in the Nairobi area. To arrive at a fair price, Tuskys took over the management of two stores to assess traffic and commercial flow at those locations. The two chains did not consult the Competition Authority of Kenya (CAK), as the law requires. When CAK learned of the transaction, the regulator stopped the deal and fined the two chains a total of KES:5.3 million (about US$38,000). CAK ordered the management arrangements to be reversed. CAK closed the two stores when the supermarket chains did not move fast enough. Tuskys, however, obtained a temporary court injunction reversing the CAK directive, until a full court hearing on the matter can be arranged in the future.

On 29 May 2015, the Botswana-based supermarket chain Choppies agreed to purchase Ukwala's ten stores for approximately US $10 million (KSh 1.4 billion). Five stores are in Kisumu, three in Nairobi, and two in Nakuru. The owners of Ukwala are reported to be exiting the retail consumer business. The transaction received Kenyan regulatory approval in November 2015. In October 2016, Choppies announced its intention to invest KSh 754.7 million (approx. US$5.4 million) into Ukwala, over the next three years, to open up more stores.

== Collapse and liquidation ==
In 2018, Ukwala Supermarket Limited filed for liquidation, citing insolvency after accumulating debts of approximately KSh 1 billion (US$7,874,000). The company reported that it was unable to meet its financial obligations to creditors, suppliers, and employees, with liabilities far exceeding its assets. (Business Daily Africa)

At the time of the liquidation application, creditor claims totaled about KSh 930 million (US$7,323,000), while the company’s assets were valued at approximately KSh 19.3 million (US$152,000). The Kenya Revenue Authority (KRA) was the largest creditor, owed about KSh 840 million (US$6,614,000). (Business Daily Africa)

The insolvency proceedings were formalized in In re Ukwala Supermarket Limited (Insolvency Cause E015 of 2018), heard at the High Court of Kenya in Nairobi, with judgment delivered on 8 May 2019. (Kenya Law)

Prior to its collapse, the retailer had begun disposing of assets, including the sale of several branches to Botswana-based Choppies Enterprises, following the resolution of legal disputes related to tax arrears. (Business Daily Africa)

In October 2024, the Registrar of Companies listed Ukwala Supermarket Limited among 32 companies slated for dissolution under the Companies Act. The statutory notice period for interested parties to raise objections was three months from the date of publication in the Kenya Gazette. If no objections were received, the company would be formally struck off the register. (Kenyans.co.ke)

In December 2024, the company was officially shut down. (The Kenya Times)

== See also ==
- List of supermarket chains in Kenya
- Economy of Kenya
