= Quick Mart Limited =

Supermarket chain in Kenya

- Type: Private
- Industry: Retail trade
- Founded: 2006
- Founder: John Kinuthia
- Headquarters: Nairobi, Kenya
- Key people: Peter Kang'iri; Chief Executive Officer
- Products: Supermarkets
- Number of employees: 5,000+ (2022)
- Subsidiaries: In Kenya
- Website: https://www.quickmart.co.ke

Quick Mart, also Quickmart, is a Kenyan supermarket chain. As of June 2022, it was the second largest supermarket chain in the country, behind market leader, Naivas Limited, with 84 stores and over 8,000 employees. At that time, according to its website, Quickmart had 53 retail outlets and employed in excess of 5,000 people.

== History ==
Quickmart was founded in 2006 in the then town of Nakuru, which is Nakuru City today. It was started by the late John Kinuthia, a businessman, who died in 2016. In its early years, it was run as a family-owned and family-operated business. As of November 2017, the retail chain maintained eight outlets.

Quickmart merged with Tumaini Self Service Limited, another retail chain in 2019. At the time of the merger, Quickmart had 11 branches and Tumaini had 13 branches. The new business adopted the Quick Mart brand. The merger concluded in 2020. The majority shareholder in the new business is Adenia Partners of Mauritius, through their wholly owned Kenyan subsidiary company Sokoni Retail Kenya.

== Overview ==
As of June 2022, Quick Mart Limited was the second-largest supermarket chain in Kenya, with 53 retail outlets. In 2017, the components of today's (2022) Quickmart had gross annual sales in excess of KSh1 billion (approx. US$10 million) then.

Quick Mart is a fast-growing retail chain. In 2021, it opened six new stores, the highest number among all supermarket chains in the country that year. A number of factors contributed to that rapid growth. Three large Kenyan supermarket chains collapsed around that time; Nakumatt, Tuskys and Uchumi all went under in rapid succession. At about this time, Choppies Enterprises Limited, a retail chain based in Botswana, withdrew from Kenya. With new funding from Adenia Partners, Quick Mart expanded into some of the locations vacated by the closed firms.

== Ownership ==
The table below illustrates the shareholding in Quick Mart Supermarkets Limited in June 2022.

Quickmart Supermarkets Limited Stock Ownership As of June 2022
Rank	Name of Owner	Domicile	Percentage Ownership	Notes
1	Kinuthia Family	Kenya	Less than 50.0	
2	Sokoni Retail Kenya*	Kenya	More than 50.0	
	Total		100.00	

- Sokoni Retail Kenya is a Kenyan investment company, wholly owned by private equity firm, Adenia Partners, based in Mauritius.

== Initial Public Offering ==
In October 2026 it made its initial public offering on the Nairobi Stock Exchange for Ksh. 7.5 a share. It listed 2 billion ordinary shares which ia 50% of the company.

== Governance ==
After the merger with Tumaini Self Service Stores, Quick Mart is led by a ten-person senior management team headed by the chief executive officer, Peter Kang'iri.

== See also ==
- List of supermarket chains in Kenya
- Economy of Kenya
