= Chandarana Food Plus Supermarkets =

Supermarket chain in Kenya

Coordinates: 1.288333°S 36.7913890°E

- Type: Private Family Owned
- Industry: Retail trade
- Founded: 1964; 62 years ago
- Headquarters: Nairobi, Kenya
- Products: Supermarkets
- Number of employees: 1,700+ (2020)
- Subsidiaries: In Kenya
- Website: Homepage

Chandarana Food Plus Supermarkets, is a Kenyan supermarket chain operated by Chandarana Food Plus Supermarkets Limited. The Head Office is in Nairobi.

== Overview ==
The supermarket chain started in 1964, as a single grocery store, operated by the patriarch of the family, the late entrepreneur Shantilal Mulji Thakkar, with twelve employees. Over the years the business has expanded to 20 stores in major urban centers in Kenya. Three of the founder's sons, Anil Thakkar, Sanjay Thakkar and Dipan Thakkar, run the enterprise.

The company's former group chief operating officer, is Hanif Rajan, a native of Eldoret, Kenya, with a varied retail career in Kenya, Canada, Seychelles and Tanzania. In an interview with Business Daily Africa, in February 2018, Rajan said that the chain owes its success to a cautious, conservative expansion policy, that has saved it from making irrational, emotional decisions. One of the areas that the chain pays special attention to are its suppliers, who deal directly with management, without any middlemen.

The supermarket has remained focused on food items, including in-house butcheries, bakeries, wine and spirits sections, fresh vegetables and sandwich shops. They have stayed away from big ticket manufactured items, such as radios, televisions, refrigerators and cookers. Also, the chain does not maintain warehouses; the suppliers deliver merchandise/produce directly to the store that they supply.

== Ownership ==
Chandarana Food Plus Supermarkets Limited is a wholly Kenyan, privately held company. As of February 2018, the detailed shareholding in the company stock is not widely or publicly known.

== Controversy ==
On 28 July 2018, an email written by a new marketing staff was deemed racist for targeting to acquire white shoppers which led to public outrage. Governor of Nairobi county, Mike Sonko moved to cancel the retailer's business licence which the legal experts said was unconstitutional until Chandarana supermarkets was given a fair hearing. The management of Chandarana supermarkets apologized adding that this was not in line with the supermarket's values.

== Developments ==
In February 2022, the Business Daily Africa reported that the retail chain had started to open stores in residential neighborhoods, away from large shopping malls, reversing previous policy. In addition, some stores had started carrying small electric appliances, which was not the case before.

As of June 2022, Chandarana Food Plus was the third largest supermarket chain in Kenya, with 24 retail outlets, behind Naivas Limited with 84 stores and Quick Mart Limited with 51 outlets, but ahead of fourth placed Carrefour Kenya with 16 stores.

== See also ==
- Kenya Economy
- Kenya Supermarkets
