= Letshego Financial Services Botswana =

Microfinance institution in Botswana

Letshego Financial Services Limited
- Company type: Subsidiary
- Industry: Financial services
- Founded: 1998
- Headquarters: Gaborone, Botswana
- Key people: Frederick Mmelesi (CEO)
- Products: Loans
- Total assets: BWP 1.5 billion (UDS 150 million)
- Parent: Letshego Holdings Limited
- Website: www.letshego.com/country/botswana/

Letshego Financial Services Botswana (LFSB), also Letshego Botswana, is a microfinance financial institution in Botswana. It is a 100% subsidiary of Letshego Holdings Limited, a holding company, with subsidiaries in over 10 African countries and whose stock is listed on the Botswana Stock Exchange. The headquarters of the institution are located in Gaborone, Botswana's capital and largest city. The company maintains about a dozen branches in the country's major urban centers.

== History ==
The institution began operations in March 1998, as Micro Provident Botswana Limited. At that time, the MFI focused on providing unsecured loans to fully employed clients. In 2002, the company was listed on the BSE, through a successful IPO. The funds from this IPO were utilized to expand the group regionally. In 2008, the company adopted the Letshego brand as its official name.

== Overview ==
LFSB is a member of the Letshego Group and in 2015 contributed in excess of 40% to group assets and profits. In addition to lending to individuals who are formally employed in the Government, parastatal and private sectors, the company have started advancing loans to miners. A mortgage product is in development.

== See also ==
- List of banks in Botswana
- Economy of Botswana
- List of companies of Botswana
