= Nakumatt =

Defunct supermarket chain in Kenya

Nakumatt Holdings Limited
- Type: Private
- Industry: Retail trade
- Founded: 1987
- Defunct: 2019
- Headquarters: Kenya, Nairobi
- Products: Supermarkets
- Website: www.nakumatt.net

Nakumatt was a Kenyan supermarket chain. "Nakumatt" is an abbreviation for Nakuru Mattress.

== Overview ==
As of December 2015, Nakumatt had 65 stores in the African Great Lakes countries of Kenya, Uganda, Rwanda and Tanzania. It employed over 5,500, and had gross annual revenue in excess of US$450 million. At that time, it had plans to enter other African countries and to increase the number of stores in the countries where it already had a presence. In October 2017 the company ran out of funds and did not pay rents or wages. 60 stores were closed. As of March 2021, the chain had only one store in operation.

== Regional subsidiaries ==
On 23 August 2008, Nakumatt opened its first store outside Kenya in the Union Trade Center, in Kigali, Rwanda. In June 2009, the first Nakumatt store in Uganda opened on Yusuf Lule Road on Kololo Hill, in central Kampala, the capital city. In November 2010, Nakumatt expanded its footprint in Kampala by acquiring Payless Supermarket, a Ugandan supermarket chain with two stores in the Kampala suburbs of Bugoloobi and Bukoto, bringing the number of stores in Uganda to three. The initial investment in the store in Kololo was approximately US$3 million. The two Payless Supermarket stores cost an estimated US$650,000. Nakumatt planned to expand and open new stores, the retail chain announced plans to open five new stores outside Kenya during the first half of the year 2016.

== Branches ==
As at October 2026, Nakumatt has no remaining branches after it sold off its remaining 6 branches to its retail competitor, Naivas Supermarkets in December 2019.

== Finances ==
Turnover in 2006 was over US$200 million, up 120% on the previous year. In 2013, turnover (annual gross revenue) was estimated at US$650 million.

== Ownership ==
Nakumatt was a wholly Kenyan, privately held company, owned by the Atul Shah family. In July 2013, Kenyan print media indicated that the chain planned to sell a 25% stake to yet an unidentified investor and use the funds for regional expansion. After that sale, the Shah family would still remain the largest shareholders in the company.

== Safety ==
The chain has a poor safety record and has faced strong criticism mainly regarding shoppers' and employees' safety. Main case in point is the 2009 Nakumatt fire in which over 29 people lost their lives. However, the management has taken steps to ensure that such accidents do not happen again.

== 2009 Nakumatt fire ==
A Nakumatt store in Nairobi suffered a massive fire on 28 January 2009, killing about 29 people.

== High-end malls ==
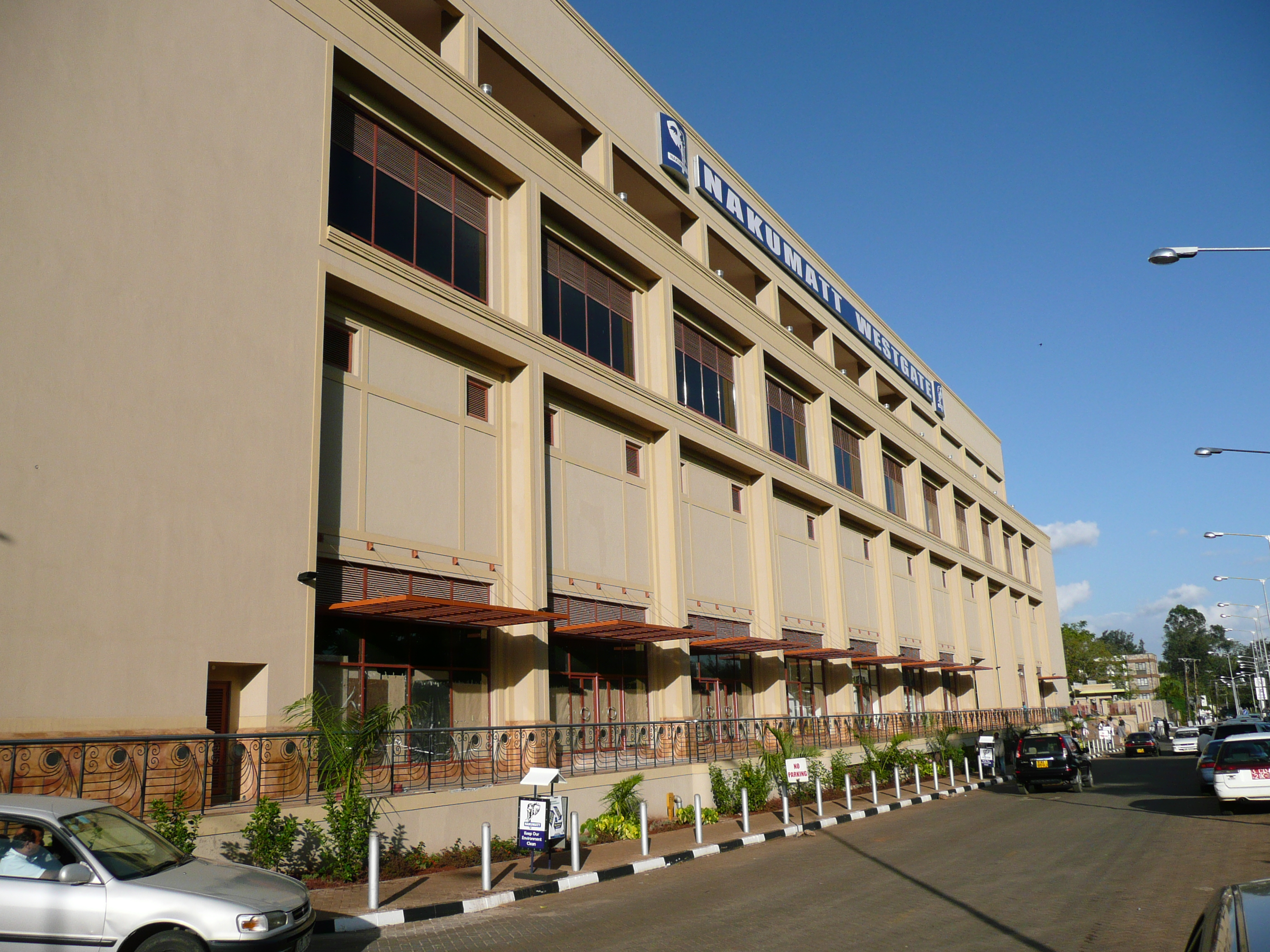

Nakumatt has played a significant role in the urban development of Kenya's largest and capital city, Nairobi, through the construction of upscale malls throughout the Nairobi area, which include brand name stores, banks, theaters and international eateries.

== Sole Sad & Invisible ==
The website of Nakumatt Holdings Limited was hacked by Iranian hackers called Sole Sad & Invisible. The website as of 31 May 2014 shows a message that the website is under construction. There is a new website www.nakumatt.net

== Closure and going out of business ==
Nakumatt began experiencing serious cash-flow issues in 2016. It was unable to meet its financial obligations to landlords, suppliers, and staff. An administrator was appointed to help it re-gain financial footing. However, in December 2019 the retail chain sold the last six branches to Naivas Supermarkets in a deal that will see the Nakumatt brand completely disappear by the end of 2019. Creditors formally voted to liquidate the company on 7 January 2020

== Legacy ==
Nakumatt played a significant role in the development and popularisation of the supermarket anchor-tenant model in Kenya's shopping-mall sector. As the chain expanded, its stores became major attractions within shopping centres, generating customer and vehicle traffic that supported smaller retailers and other businesses operating within the same malls. A 2019 study of Nakumatt's withdrawal from three Nairobi shopping malls noted that Nakumatt had served as an anchor tenant in approximately 75% of Kenya's major shopping malls, reflecting the chain's importance to the country's mall-based retail model.

Nakumatt's commercial importance to mall developers was derived from its ability to attract large volumes of shoppers. The presence of the retailer was used by shopping-centre developers to attract other tenants, while its large stores often served as the principal destination around which other retail, restaurant and service businesses were located. Contemporary reporting described Nakumatt as the preferred anchor tenant for numerous new and existing malls, with developers competing to secure the retailer because of the customer traffic it was expected to generate.

The significance of Nakumatt's role became particularly evident during its financial collapse. Research examining three Nairobi shopping malls following the retailer's exit found that traffic declined by almost 50% in some locations, while reduced business activity, occupancy levels, rental rates and overall mall financial performance were also reported. In litigation concerning Nakumatt's tenancy at Junction Mall, the High Court of Kenya similarly recorded that Nakumatt had been intended to act as the mall's anchor tenant and that declining stock levels at the store had been accompanied by a reduction in human traffic to the shopping centre.

Following Nakumatt's collapse, its former retail spaces were taken over by other supermarket chains and retailers, while the practice of using major supermarkets and international retail brands as anchor tenants continued to form a central part of Kenya's shopping-centre industry. Academic research on the Kenyan retail sector has described Nakumatt and Uchumi as anchor tenants in most shopping malls before their collapse, after which some malls secured replacement anchors including Carrefour and Foodplus. Former Nakumatt premises were subsequently occupied by retailers including Carrefour and Shoprite, illustrating the continuation of the supermarket-anchor model after Nakumatt's disappearance.

Nakumatt pioneered and popularised the use of large supermarket and hypermarket chains as anchor tenants in Kenya's modern shopping-mall industry, a model that continued to be used by developers and competing retailers following the company's collapse.

== See also ==
- Molo Fire
- Uchumi
- Tuskys
- 2011 Nairobi Fire
- Kenya Economy
- 2009 Nakumatt Fire
