= List of supermarket chains in Nigeria =

This is a list of supermarket chains in Nigeria.

- Addide Supermarket
- FoodCo Supermarkets
- Game Stores
- Jara Superstore
- Shoprite
- Spar Supermarkets
- Ace Supermarkets
- Everyday Supermarket
- Markets Square
- Marketstand Supermarket
- OjajaMore

== See also ==
- List of supermarket chains in Africa
