= Sefalana =

South African supermarket chain

Sefalana Holding Company Limited
- Type: Public
- Traded as: BwSE: SEFALANA
- Industry: Retail, Fast-moving consumer goods
- Founded: 1974
- Headquarters: Gaborone, Botswana
- Key people: Chandrakanth Chauhan, CEO and, Chairman
- Revenue: ▲BWP5.8 billion (FY 2020)
- Net income: ▲BWP259 million(FY 2020)
- Subsidiaries: Delta Dairies, Cash ’n Carry, Seasons Group
- Website: sefalana.com

Sefalana, is Botswana's second largest food retailer. It operates more than 1200 stores across Africa. The company's headquarters are in Gaborone, Botswana. Sefalana is a public company listed on the Botswana Stock Exchange.

== History ==
Sefalana was founded in 1974 by Norman Joseph Lazarus from Vryburg, South Africa as Sefalana sa Botswana.

== Acquisitions ==
- Delta Dairies in 2015.
- Cash ’n Carry outlet and TFS Wholesalers to enter the Lesotho market.
- Seasons Group in Australia

== See also ==
- Choppies
- Checkers (supermarket chain)
- Shoprite (retailer)
- List of supermarket chains in Botswana
