= Maathai Supermarkets =

Supermarket chain in Kenya

Coordinates: 01°02′09″S 37°04′24″E

Mathais Supermarkets
- Company type: Private
- Industry: Retail trade
- Headquarters: Thika, Kenya
- Key people: Viktah Maina; Chairman & Proprietor
- Products: Supermarkets
- Number of employees: 500+ (2015)
- Subsidiaries: In Kenya

Maathai Supermarkets, often referred to simply as Maathai, is a supermarket chain in Kenya.

== Location ==
The Head Office of Maathai Supermarkets is located along Thika road, Highpoint Juja, in downtown Kiambu County, approximately 33 kilometres (21 mi), by road, northeast of Nairobi, the largest city in Kenya, and the capital of that country.

== Overview ==
The supermarket chain owns and operates supermarkets in Kenya, the largest economy in the East African Community. Mathai is the number one retailer supermarket retailer chains in Central region Kenya.

== Branches ==
As of September 2023 the supermarket chain maintains a total of 11 branches in the following locations:

1. Thika
2. Muranga
3. Nyeri
4. Karatina
5. Nairobi
6. Embu
7. Meru

== Ownership ==
Mathai is a wholly Kenyan, privately held company. Kenyan print media indicate that the supermarket chain is owned by Viktah Maina, a Kenyan-based businessman.

== Recent developments ==
In September 2014, the retail chain opened its first store in the central business district (CBD) of Nairobi, Kenya's capital and largest city. Located along Ronald Ngala Street, the store has over 100 staff. It is located in a building owned by Viktah Maina, the proprietor of the supermarket chain. He also has investments in construction, entertainment, real estate and stone quarries. In March 2022, the retailer opened a second outlet in Embu town, 134 km from Nairobi County.

== See also ==
- Kenya Supermarkets
- Naivas
- Quickmart Supermarket
- Magunas Supermarket
- Carrefour
- Ukwala
