= List of supermarket chains in Djibouti =

This is the list of supermarket chains in Djibouti.

- Al Gamil
- Cash Centre Leader Price
- Casino Supermarkets
- Etablissement Ladieh
- Napoleon Supermarkets
- Nougaprix
- Semiramis

Grocery shopping in Djibouti is old-fashioned. Convenience stores, markets, street-corner vendors and food trucks still constitute the main outlets of consumer goods.

== See also ==
- List of supermarket chains in Africa
- List of supermarket chains
