= List of supermarket chains in Cameroon =

This is a list of supermarket chains in Cameroon.

- Casino Supermarkets
- DOVV Distribution
- Eco Marché
- Ecoprix
- Le Bon Point
- Leader Price
- Mahima Supermarkets
- Carrefour
- Super U
- Spar
- Santa Lucia
- Bel Achat
- Bonus

== See also ==
- List of supermarket chains in Africa
- List of supermarket chains
