= Atul Shah =

- Born: 1961 (age 64–65); Nakuru, Kenya
- Occupations: Businessman & entrepreneur
- Years active: 1978–2017
- Organization: Nakumatt Holdings Limited
- Title: Managing Director & CEO; Nakumatt Holdings Limited

Atul Shah is a businessman and entrepreneur in Kenya. He is the managing director and chief executive officer of the Nakumatt Holdings Limited, the parent company of Nakumatt Supermarkets, the largest, privately owned supermarket chain in the African Great Lakes area, with branches in Kenya, Uganda, Tanzania and Rwanda. As of September 2014, the retail chain maintained 50 stores in four countries, employed over 7,000 people and had annual sales in excess of US$650 million.

== Background and education ==
He was born in Nandi Hills, Kenya in 1961. In 1965, when Atul was four years old, the family relocated to Nakuru. Atul's father, Mangalal Shah, who had migrated to Kenya from India in 1947, opened a retail clothing store opposite the Nakuru open air market. Atul' s older brother, Vimal started working in the business in 1970. In 1975 Mangalal began exporting clothing to Uganda, often on credit. Towards the end of 1976, with debtors behind on their payments and creditors demanding for their money, Atul's father declared bankruptcy, with total debts of KSh1.2 million. The store was closed and Mangalal went to work for his brother Hasmukh Shah, who then owned a shop called Nakuru Mattresses.

Following the closure of their father's business, Atul Shah and his brother, Vimal Shah opened a clothing store that they named Furmatts, which among other things, sold bed sheets which the brothers stitched at home. In 1978, due to booming business, supported by the 1970s coffee boom in East Africa, the two sons and their father managed to pay off the KSh1.2 million debt. They bought Nakuru Mattress from their uncle, who relocated to the United Kingdom.

== Nakumatt supermarkets ==
Under new ownership, Nakuru Mattress and Furmatts began integrating their operations. From two stores Nakuru town in 1978, they diversified the list of items on offer. In addition to clothes and mattresses, they began selling saucepans, cooking pots, plastic basins and umbrellas, among other products. In 1984, they opened a store in Eldoret, their first outside of Nakuru. In 1986 the retail chain expanded to Nairobi, with a store on Ukwala Road.

Over the next 30 years, the supermarket chain grew into the largest retailer in Kenya, with over 36 stores, employing over 4,500 people. In 2008, the retailer opened its first outlet outside of Kenya, in Kigali, Rwanda. New branches in neighboring Uganda followed in 2009. The first store in Tanzania came in 2011. The retail chain has plans to expand operations to Burundi and South Sudan in the next two to three years.

== Wealth ==
In 2013, Atul Shah is reported to have valued shareholders' equity in the retail chain at US$400 million (KSh34 billion at that time). The privately owned family business does not publish its financial statements. However, given that the family is the majority shareholder, Atul Shah is one of Kenya's wealthiest individuals.

== See also ==
- List of wealthiest people in Kenya
- List of supermarket chains in Kenya
- Economy of Kenya
