= Worker-consumer hybrid =

Type of cooperative

A Worker-consumer hybrid cooperative is, as the name implies, a mix of the two more common forms of cooperatives, the worker cooperative and the consumer cooperative. In this type of cooperative the power is divided between the workers and consumers. This could for example be achieved by equal representation to the cooperative's board of directors, where the consumers and workers would elect a given (or equal) number of people to the board each.

An example of such a cooperative is Eroski, a part of the Spanish Mondragon Corporation group which operates supermarkets and petrol stations around the whole nation and in particular in the Basque country from where the company originates.

Worker-consumer cooperatives are forms of multi-stakeholder cooperatives.
