= Letshego =

Microfinance holding company in Botswana

Letshego Holdings Limited
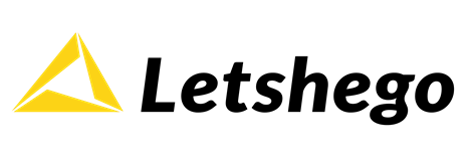
- Type: Public
- Traded as: BSE:LETSHEGO
- Industry: Microfinance
- Founded: 4 March 1998; 28 years ago
- Headquarters: Gaborone, Botswana
- Key people: Philip Odera; Group Chairman; Brighton Banda; Acting Group Chief Executive
- Products: Lending Savings Payments Insurance
- Total assets: BWP: 16.909 billion (USD:1.352 billion) (2022)
- Number of employees: 3000 (2022)
- Website: www.letshego.com letshegoinvestor.com

Letshego Holdings Limited is a microfinance holding company with its headquarters in Gaborone, Botswana and is listed on the Botswana Stock Exchange (BSE). Letshego is a Setswana word meaning “Support”.

== Overview ==
Letshego Holdings Limited is a pan-African inclusive finance organisation with a presence in 11 countries and a legacy that spans more than 25 years, having first opened its doors in 1998 in Gaborone, Botswana. As at December 2022, the Group’s market capitalisation was in excess of USD 1 Billion, thereby making it the largest indigenous quoted company on the BSE BSE. Letshego’s purpose is to ‘improve lives’ by increasing access to simple and affordable financial solutions, and currently supports over 6.6 million consumers across its African footprint. Letshego has over 3000 employees, including direct sales agents. December December 2022, the group's total assets were valued at BWP:16.909 billion (approx. USD:1.352 billion), with shareholder's equity valued at BWP:5.658 billion (approx. USD:452.65 million).

== History ==
Letshego Holdings Limited was incorporated on 4 March 1998 as Micro Provident Botswana Limited a microfinance institution whose core function was to provide of unsecured loans clients, who had full-time employment. The company was listed on the BSE in 2002 through a successful IPO. The funds from this IPO were utilized to expand the group regionally.

Between 2005 and 2007, the group expanded to Uganda, Eswatini, Tanzania and Zambia. These were all through greenfield investments in these countries. In August 2008, the group made its first foreign acquisition when it acquired a majority stake in Eduloan, an MFI in Namibia. In the same year, the company adopted the Letshego brand as its official name. The expansion drive continued into 2009 with the setting up of a subsidiary in Mozambique.

In 2011, the group commenced its operations in Lesotho. In the same year, the group announced its intention to acquire a 62.52% in Micro Africa Limited, a Kenya-based MFI with subsidiaries in Kenya, Uganda, Rwanda and South Sudan. This acquisition gave group access to three new countries and an increase in its Ugandan customer base due to its pre-existing presence. This acquisition was completed on June 1, 2012. This saw the group have presence in 11 countries. Letshego Holdings took full control of Micro Africa Limited in 2013. On 1 December 2013 the group divested from Letshego Financial Services Zambia. With the exit from Zambia, the group's presence remained in 10 countries. In January 2016, Letshego Holdings Limited completed the acquisition of 100% shareholding in FBN Microfinance Bank of Nigeria.

== Ownership ==
The shares of the stock of Letshego Holdings Limited are traded on the Botswana Stock Exchange, under the symbol: LETSHEGO. As of December 2019, shareholding in the group's stock was as depicted in the table below:

Letshego Holdings Limited Stock Ownership
Rank	Name of Owner	% Ownership
1	Botswana Life Insurance Limited	27.9
2	African Alliance	13.3
3	Botswana Insurance Fund Management Limited	11.7
4	ADP I HOLDING 2	8.4
5	Allan Gray	5.1
6	BMO Investment: Former Lloyd George Investment Company	4.1
7	Investec	3.5
8	HSBC: Sustainable Capital Africa Alpha Fund	2.8
9	Standard Chartered Bank of Botswana Nominees (Pty) Ltd – Kuwait Investment Authority	2.3
10	Standard Chartered Bank of Botswana Nominees (Pty) Ltd - NTGSLUX 010/03 Ashmore Emerging markets	1.9
11	Other corporate entities, nominees and trusts and individuals	18.3
12	Treasury shares	0.9
	Total	100.00

== Member companies ==
The companies that compose the Letshego Holdings Limited include but are not limited to the following:

1. Letshego Financial Services Botswana – 100% Shareholding – Botswana
2. Letshego Kenya Limited – 100% Shareholding – Kenya
3. Letshego Rwanda Limited – 100% Shareholding – Rwanda
4. AMDC Limited (Mauritius) - 100% shareholding - Holding company for the Rwanda Operations.
5. Letshego Financial Services Lesotho Limited – 95% Shareholding – Lesotho
6. Letshego Financial Services Mozambique, SA – 96.25% Shareholding – Mozambique
7. Letshego Bank Namibia – 85% Shareholding – Namibia
8. Letshego Financial Services Swaziland (Proprietary) Limited – 85% Shareholding – Swaziland
9. Letshego Financial Services Tanzania Limited - 100% shareholding - Tanzania
10. Letshego Bank Tanzania – 87% Shareholding – Tanzania
11. Letshego Microfinance Uganda – 85% Shareholding – Uganda
12. FBN Microfinance Bank Limited – 100% Shareholding – Nigeria
13. ERF 8585 Limited - 100% Shareholding - Namibia (Real estate company).
14. AFB Ghana- financial services

== Governance ==
Letshego Holdings Limited is governed by a twelve-person board of directors with Philip Odera as the Group chairman and Aobakwe “Aupa” Monyatsi as the Group Chief Executive.

== See also ==
- Botswana Stock Exchange
- BSE DCI
