= 2009 Nakumatt supermarket fire =

Deadly fire in downtown Nairobi, Kenya

- Date: 28 January 2009
- Location: Nairobi, Kenya
- Deaths: 29

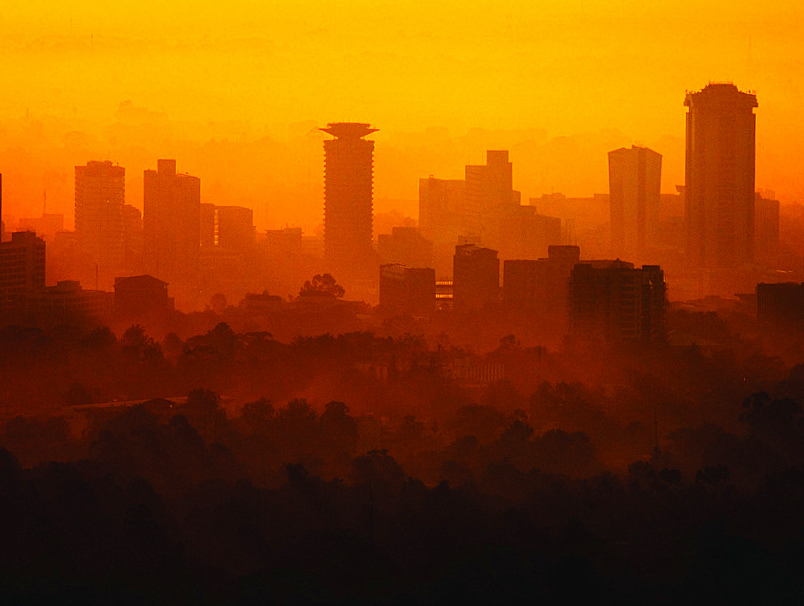
The Nairobi skyline

The 2009 Nakumatt supermarket fire occurred when a supermarket in downtown Nairobi, Kenya, caught fire on 28 January 2009. Twenty-nine remains were located in the rubble of the destroyed Nakumatt supermarket, with police investigating a tip that security guards locked exit doors in an effort to prevent looting. However the locking of the doors on the ground floor had no effect on the victims, as they were all found on the floor above. The fire allegedly started near the only staircase accessible to the public, trapping the victims in the shop. One other man died after leaping from the building to escape the flames. Forty-seven were missing. The bodies of the dead are "charred beyond recognition".

Official reports said one person died in the hospital from injuries brought on by poisonous fumes and injuries sustained in the inferno but another 39 were unaccounted for and were officially reported as "missing". The emergency services were criticised for what the Kenyan media viewed as an inadequate response to the blaze. Following the blaze, the Daily Nation reported that Nairobi's three million inhabitants were served only by one fire station situated close to a traffic-choked business district. Although it happened on 28 January, it was not widely reported across the world until two days later when the full scale of the fire was recognised.

== Inferno ==
The fire began on 28 January 2009, a Wednesday afternoon, when the Woolworths Building which housed Nakumatt Downtown Nairobi caught fire at 3 pm. The blaze was still being fought 24 hours later. A power transformer had earlier blown and there were reports that gas cylinders on sale at the supermarket and chemicals at a hardware shop in the neighbouring Alibhai Shariff Building had fueled the inferno. Members of the public helped to fight the blaze which ensued. Thousands of people were evacuated from their offices in downtown Nairobi as plumes of black smoke were sent into the sky overhead. The smoke forced the evacuation of some nearby buildings, with police employing whips, horses and teargas to beat back curious crowds. One man died after leaping from an upper floor of the burning supermarket, whilst one other man, Nakumatt employee Jeremiah Omoyo, also leaped off the roof to escape the blaze but survived. Another Nakumatt employee told Kenya's The Standard newspaper that the crowd were encouraging the trapped customers and employees to jump. The Kenyan media has criticised the emergency response, claiming that firefighters arrived late and in inadequate numbers. Daily Nation, the second largest newspaper in Kenya, remarked on the way the fire was handled and responded to by saying, "It is fair to say that ours is a modern city with an 18th century fire-fighting infrastructure." The City Council Fire Brigade were helped by two private companies with fire engines - G4S and Knight Support. This is the first of two tragedies to happen in Kenya in the same week; at least 113 people were killed when an oil spill caught fire in Molo.

=== Casualties ===
Actress and radio presenter Angel Wainaina, known for her role as Sergeant Maria on the Cobra Squad TV series, was one of the victims and her body has been identified. Peter Serry, the CEO of Tusker FC football club was at the supermarket when the fire broke and has been missing since then, while Tusker FC coach James Nandwa, who accompanied Serry, escaped with minor injuries.

=== Rebuilding ===
The remains of the Woolworths building that housed the supermarket were scrapped after the fire. The building is set to be rebuilt and according to National Museums of Kenya, it is a historical building that should resemble the previous one and built using red bricks. On the other hand, Steve Oundo, the chairman of Architectural Association of Kenya prefers a remembrance hall on the site, instead of rebuilding the supermarket.

== Nakumatt chain ==
Nakumatt was a supermarket chain that had 18 stores across Kenya, employing 3,200 people and expanded to Uganda, Rwanda and other East African countries. Nakumatt was a wholly Kenyan company owned by the Atul Shah family and Hotnet Ltd. On 23 August, Nakumatt opened its first store outside Kenya in the Union Trade Center, in Kigali, Rwanda.
