= Eroski =

Spanish supermarket chain

Eroski, S. Coop
- Company type: Sociedad Cooperativa
- Industry: Retail
- Founded: 1969
- Headquarters: Elorrio, Basque Country, Spain
- Number of locations: 1,001 total locations
- Area served: Spain, France, Gibraltar
- Products: Bakery, dairy, deli, frozen foods, general grocery, meat, pharmacy, produce, seafood, snacks, liquor, floral, package holidays, petrol
- Number of employees: 30,000 (2020)
- Parent: Mondragón
- Website: eroski.es

Eroski is a Spanish supermarket chain headquartered in Elorrio, Basque Country. It is run as a worker-consumer hybrid co-operative within the Mondragón Corporation group, with nearly 1,000 outlets spread across Spain (excluding franchises). The establishments vary in size from the largest hypermarkets, simply named 'Eroski' (of which there are 75 stores, including 40 with petrol stations), down to smaller 'Eroski Center' stores (473, including 2 petrol stations). There are also 219 'Eroski City' outlets and 234 'Eroski Viajes' travel agent centres. The group's total sales floor space is approximately 1,500,000 square metres (16,145,866 sq ft). The name Eroski is a combination of the Basque words erosi (to buy) and toki (place).

== History ==
The company was founded in 1969 in the regions of Biscay and Gipuzkoa in Spain as a co-operative between ten supermarkets in the region. Its headquarters are located in Elorrio, Biscay.

== Franchises ==
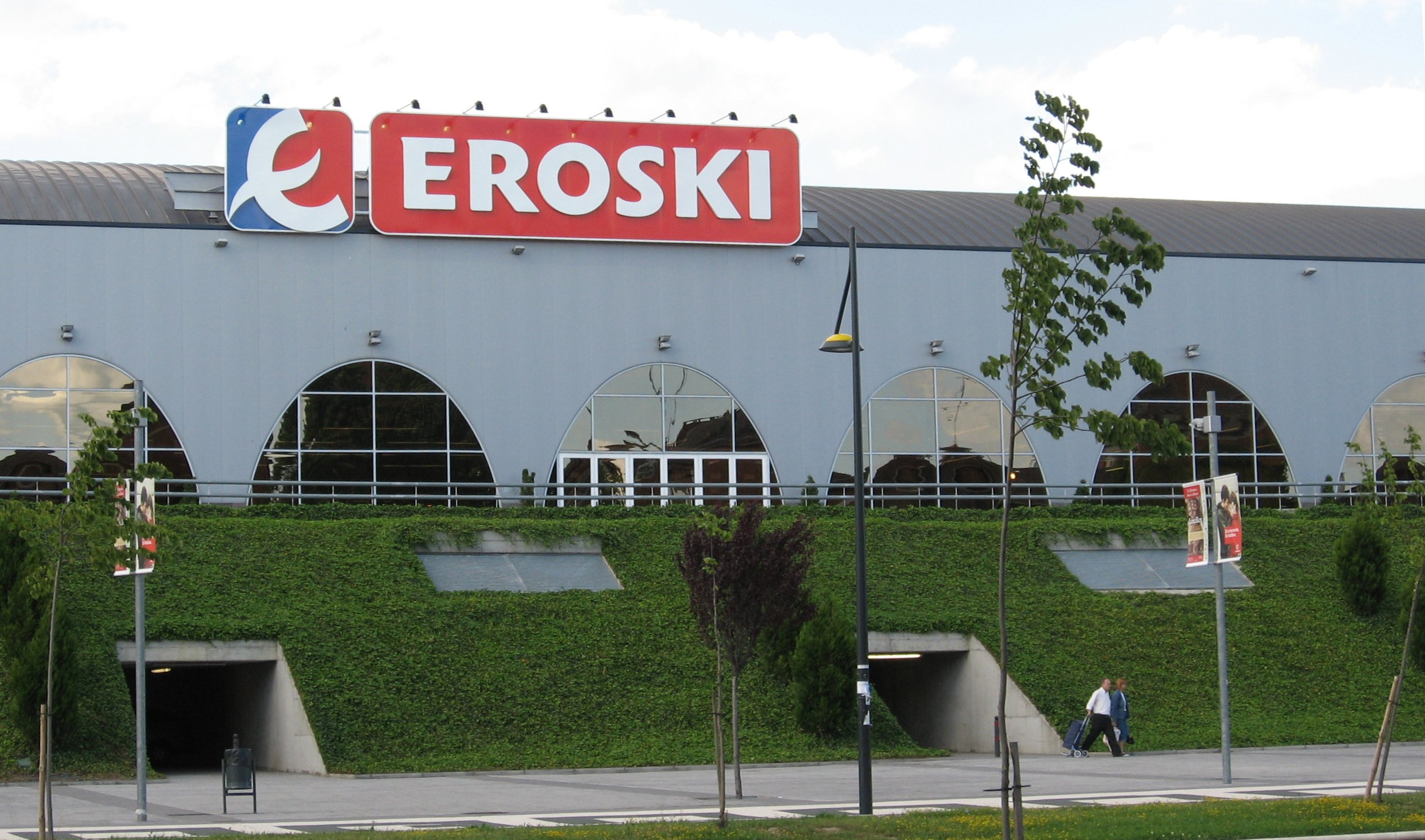
An Eroski supermarket in Vitoria

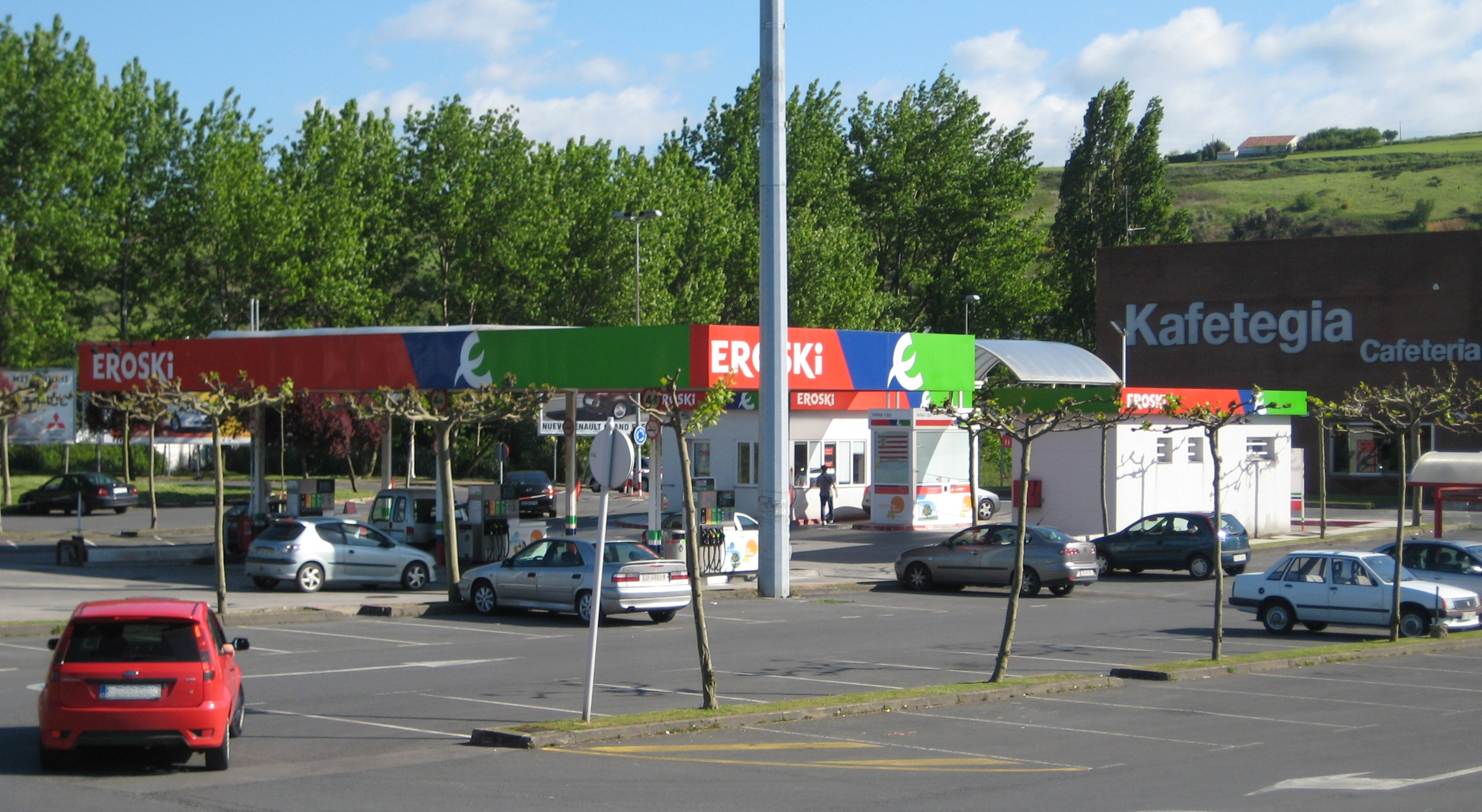
A petrol station in Leioa, Biscay

Aliprox supermarkets are not owned by Eroski, despite having a similar logo. Instead, Aliprox is the brand for franchises. These outlets are independently owned, but still maintain the same product ranges, sales policies and general standard expected throughout the company. There are presently 553 franchised outlets.

== Finances ==
As of mid-2016, Eroski's operating income was 45% higher than in the first semester of 2015 and increased to 54 million euros.

- Eroski has 442 new generation shops, 23 hypermarkets and 419 supermarkets, growing by 7% in sales on average
- Turnover remained stable at 2,965 million Euros
- Investments reached 45 million euros, mainly aimed at shop refurbishment and information systems
- It reduced its financial debt by 169 million euros during the first six months of the year
- Between February and July this year, EROSKI generated 625 new jobs in its owned and franchised shops
- The parent cooperative EROSKI S. Coop. reached a profit of 8.8 million euros

== Staff ==
- In 2004, staff numbers exceeded 30,000 for the first time.
- Nearly 7,000 new positions have been created in the last four years.

== Growth ==
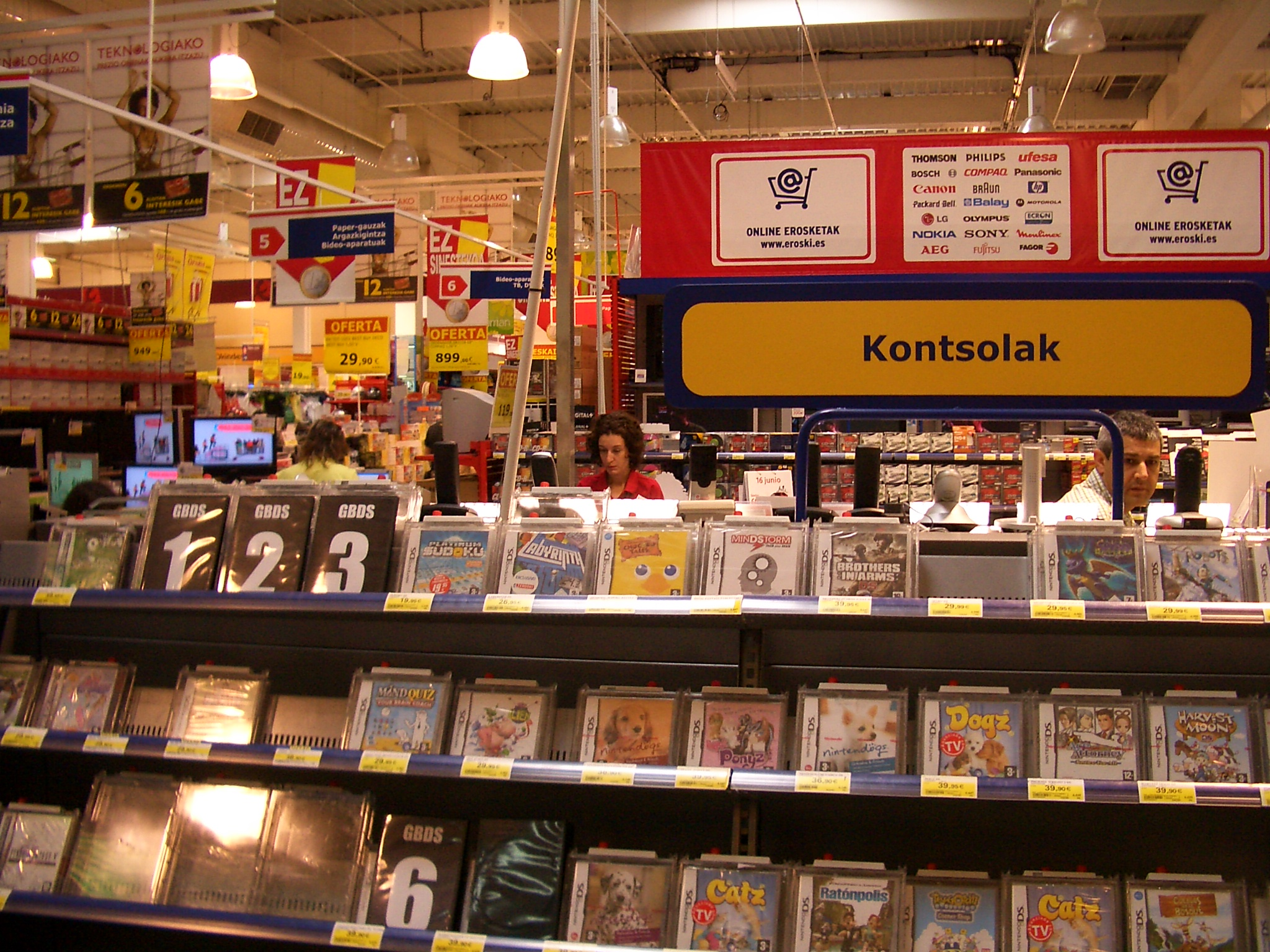
Largely Basque signage inside the Eroski store in Arrasate/Mondragon

=== Brand ===
These names replace the former hierarchy of 'Eroski', 'Maxi', 'Consum' and 'Charter', the latter of which was the name reserved for smaller franchise stores. This rebranding took place during the course of 2003–2004 in an effort to re-focus the company as the many different names confused customers. Indeed, regardless of the name over the door, customers inevitably referred to the shops as 'Eroski', not Maxi or Charter. Under the new name, consumers are referring to the company correctly.

== By country ==
=== Spain ===
In 2007, Eroski purchased Caprabo, adding around 500 supermarkets to the chain.

=== France ===
Having gained a strong grip over the Spanish mainland, especially in the Basque Country from where the company originates, it expanded into France. They have three hypermarkets, eighteen supermarkets and seven petrol stations in the country at this time. In addition, they also own the Forum Sport store chain, 172 perfume shops and six cash and carry outlets.

A merger with the Valencia-based co-operative Consum lasted only a few years. In 2005, each went their own way.

Figures correct as of July 2005.

=== United Kingdom ===
As of August 2024, Eroski has five stores in Gibraltar.

== See also ==
- Supermarkets in Spain
