= Froiz =

Company in Pontevedra, Spain

Distribuciones Froiz, S.A.

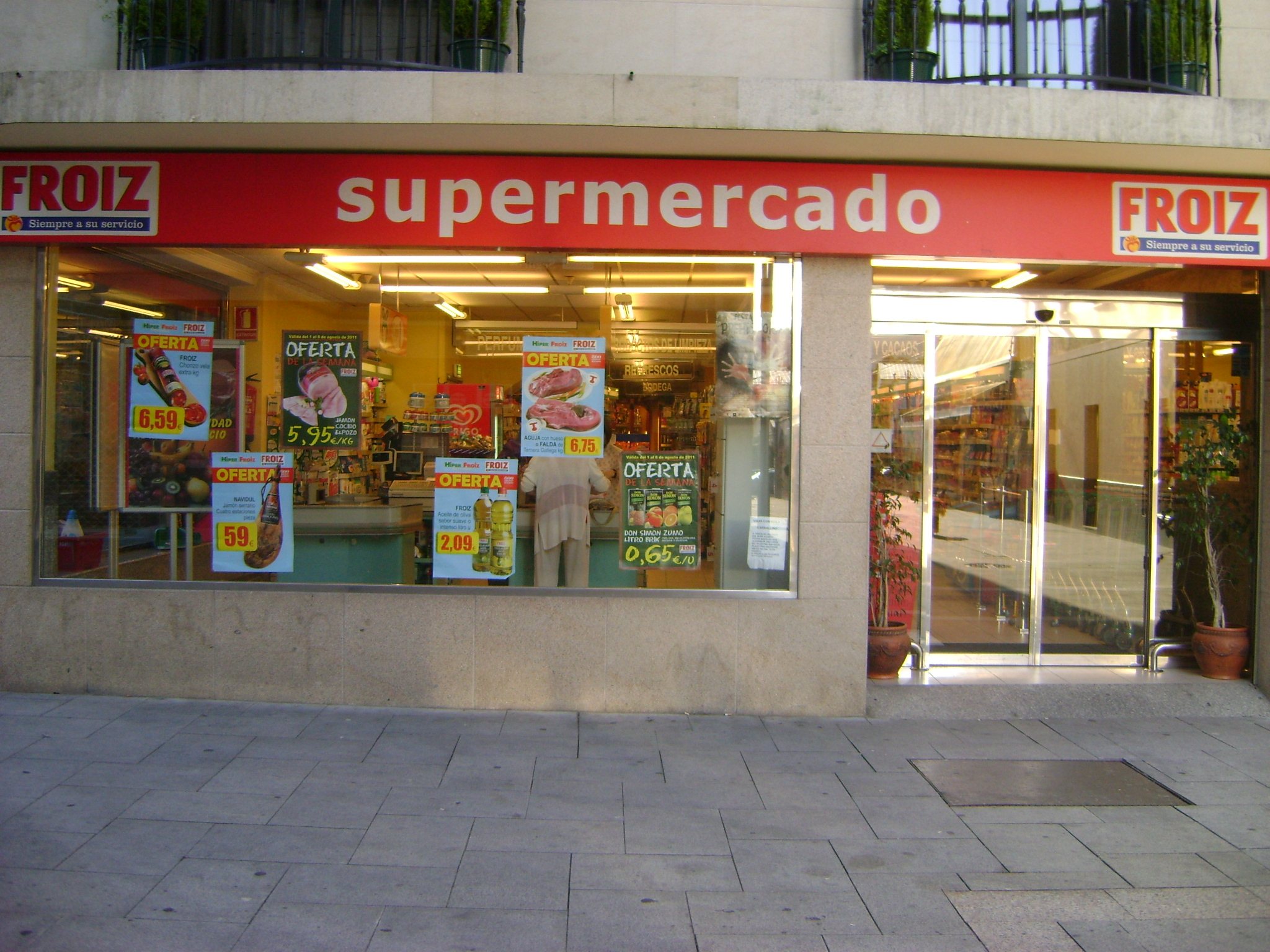
- Company type: Sociedad Anónima
- Industry: Retail
- Founded: Pontevedra, Spain (1968)
- Founder: Magín Alfredo Froiz Planes
- Headquarters: Poio (Pontevedra), Spain
- Number of locations: 336 stores
- Area served: Spain & Portugal
- Key people: José Froiz Prieto, Director-general
- Revenue: € 750 million (2022)
- Number of employees: 6,200
- Website: www.froiz.es

Distribuciones Froiz, S.A. is a Spanish supermarket chain based in Poio, Galicia. It operates in the Spanish regions of Galicia, Castile and León, Castilla-La Mancha, Madrid and in Northern Portugal. It is the company with the seventeenth-highest turnover in Galicia. The company was founded in Pontevedra in 1970 by Magín Alfredo Froiz Planes, deceased on 10 March 2022, and remains a family-run business.

In October 2014, Froiz bought rival supermarket Supermercados Moldes becoming the third-biggest supermarket chain in Galicia.

== Operations ==
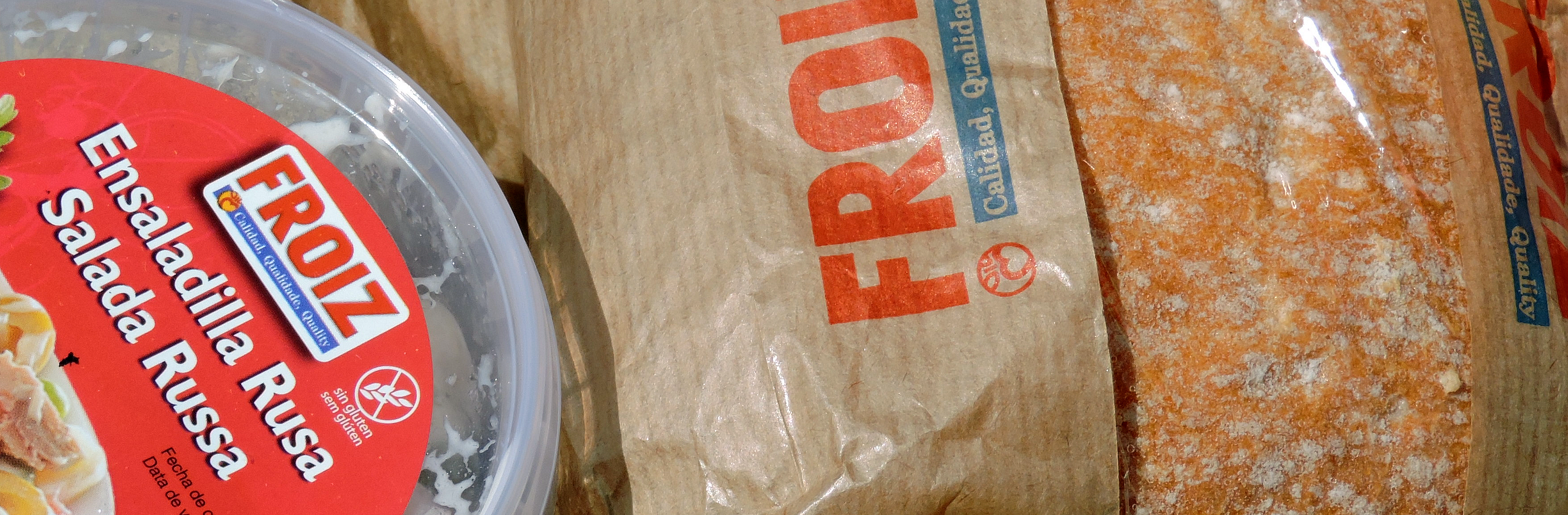
Froiz private label products

Froiz's operations are divided into four formats, differentiated by size and the range of products sold. Tandy or Merca Mas is the name given to Froiz's franchised convenience stores.

| Name | Shop type | Number of stores |
|---|---|---|
| Supermercados Froiz | Supermarket | 227 |
| Hiper Froiz | Hypermarket | 6 |
| Cash Froiz | Cash & Carry | 8 |
| Tandy/Merca Mas | Convenience store | 72 |
| Total | | 313 |

== Sponsorship ==
Froiz is the owner of the cycling team Grupo Deportivo Supermercados Froiz (Súper Froiz) and the main sponsor of the Óscar Pereiro Foundation cycling team.

== See also ==
- List of supermarket chains in Spain
