= Advans Banque Congo =

Bank based in the Democratic Republic of the Congo

Advans Banque Congo S.A.
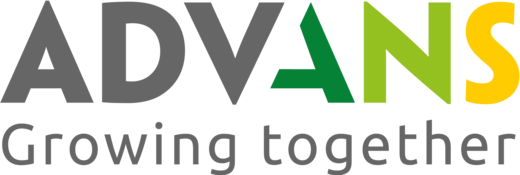
- Type: Private
- Industry: Banking
- Founded: October 8, 2008
- Headquarters: Avenue du Bas Congo, N°4, Kinshasa, DRC
- Products: Loans, Checking, Savings
- Number of employees: 360
- Website: Advans Banque Congo

Advans Banque Congo S.A., commonly referred to as Advans Banque, is an independent commercial bank based in the Democratic Republic of the Congo, with its headquarters located in Kinshasa.

== History ==
Advans Banque Congo was incorporated in July 2008 and granted a commercial banking license in May 2009 by the Central Bank of Congo.

In March 2020, Proparco lent $3 million to Advans Banque Congo.

== Description ==
The bank has a particular focus on the provision of financial services to micro, small and medium Congolese enterprises as its niche market. Advans Banque operates 10 branches in four Congolese cities.

Advans Banque Congo is a venture between Advans SA (formally knows as Lafayette investment), a venture capital firm registered in Luxembourg as majority shareholder with KfW Entwicklungsbank, African Development Bank, International Finance Corporation and Horus Development Finance as minority shareholders in the venture. Advans SA aims to establish microfinance financial institutions in emerging economies. Advans SA owns microfinance institutions in the Democratic Republic of the Congo, Cameroon, Ghana, Cambodia, Pakistan, Côte d'Ivoire and Tanzania.

Advans Banque Congo Stock Ownership

Rank	Shareholder	% Ownership
1	Advans SA of Luxembourg	50.1
2	KfW	23.6
3	IFC	13.8
4	ADB	12.6
	Total	100.00

== See also ==
- List of banks in Africa
- Advans Bank Tanzania
- Central Bank of Congo
