= BSE DCI =

Botswanan stock market index

The Botswana Stock Exchange Domestic Company Index or BSE DCI, and the Botswana Stock Exchange Foreign Company Index or BSE FCI are the principal stock indices of the Botswana Stock Exchange. Each is calculated from the weighted averages of the values of their category of stock. A third index value, the All Company Index, is derived from a weighted average of the two indices. On the Botswana Stock Exchange, a company that is designated as a "foreign company" is a company that is "dual-listed", meaning that it is also listed on another stock exchange.

== Index listings ==
as of December 2016

=== Domestic companies ===
Symbol	Company	Industry
BARCLAYS	Barclays Bank of Botswana	Banking
BIHL	Botswana Insurance Holdings	Insurance
BTCL	Botswana Telecommunications Corporation	Telecommunications
CHOBE	Chobe Holdings	Tourism
CHOPPIES	Choppies Enterprises	Retail
CRESTA	Cresta Hotels	Hotels
ENGEN	Engen Botswana	Petroleum
FPC	The Far Property Company Limited	Real Estate
FNBB	First National Bank of Botswana	Banking
FURNMART	FurnMart Limited (formerly Furniture Mart)	Retail
G4S	G4S Botswana	Security Services
LETLOLE	Letlole La Rona	Property Management
LETSHEGO	Letshego Holdings Limited	Finance
NAP	New African Properties	Real Estate
OLYMPIA	Olympia Capital Corporation	Building Material
PRIMETIME	Primetime Property Holdings	Property Management
RDCP	RDC Properties	Property Management
RPC DATA	RPC Data	ICT
SECHABA	Sechaba Brewery Holdings	Breweries
SEFALANA	Sefalana Holding Company	Wholesale
STANCHART	Standard Chartered Botswana Limited	Banking
TURNSTAR	Turnstar Holdings	Property Management
WIL	Wilderness Holdings	Tourism

=== Foreign companies ===
The list of foreign companies as of December 2016 is:

Symbol	Company	Industry
ANGLO	Anglo American	Mining
BLUE	Blue Financial Services	Finance
GG	Galane Gold Limited	Mining
INVESTEC	Investec Group	Finance

=== Venture capital companies ===
Although not currently part of any official market index, a third BSE category, "Venture Capital Companies", is as follows (all companies are foreign-based unless otherwise disclosed):

- A CAP Resources
- African Energy Resources
- Botswana Diamonds plc
- Lucara Diamond Corporation
- Magnum Gas and Power Limited
- Shumba Energy Limited
