= NICO Holdings =

NICO Holdings Plc
- Company type: Public
- Traded as: MSE: NICO
- Industry: Insurance, Investments, Property, Financial services
- Founded: 1971; 55 years ago
- Headquarters: Chibisa Hse 19 Glyn Jones; Blantyre, Malawi
- Products: List: Insurance Asset Management Property REITs Banking Holding
- Website: nicomw.com

NICO Holdings plc is a diversified financial services group and is listed on the Malawi Stock Exchange. The NICO group sponsored the Malawi national netball team in 2025/26.

== Overview ==
NICO Holdings' headquarters are in Blantyre, Malawi, with operating presence in six African countries i.e. Malawi, Zambia, Tanzania, Uganda, Mozambique and Zimbabwe. The group offers a wide range of financial products and services which include: asset management, life assurance, retirement planning, general insurance, health insurance, banking, information technology and property management.

NICO Holdings was founded in 1971 as a short-term insurance company called National Insurance Company Limited. NICO became the first company to be listed on the Malawi Stock Exchange in 1996. Since then, the group has listed two of its subsidiaries on the stock market i.e. NBS Bank Plc in 2007 and ICON Properties Plc in 2019.

== Member companies ==
The companies that compose the NICO Holdings are organised into five divisions and include, but are not limited, to the following:

=== Insurance ===
- NICO General Insurance Company – Blantyre, Malawi – 51% Shareholding – Offering short term insurance. Remaining 49% held by Sanlam.
- NICO Life Insurance Company Limited – Blantyre, Malawi – 51% Shareholding – Offering long-term and life insurance. Remaining 49% held by Sanlam.
- NICO Insurance (Zambia) Limited – Lusaka, Zambia – 51% Shareholding – Offering short term insurance. Remaining 49% held by Sanlam.
- Sanlam General Insurance Tanzania – Dar es Salaam, Tanzania – 20% Shareholding – Offering General Insurance in Tanzania.
- Sanlam Mozambique Vida Companhia de Seguros, SA – Maputo, Mozambique – 34.30% Shareholding – Offering General Insurance

=== Banking ===
- NBS Bank Plc – Blantyre, Malawi – 50.10% Shareholding – A midsized retail bank licensed by the Reserve Bank of Malawi. The shares of NBS Bank are listed on the MSE.
- Standard Bank Plc – Blantyre, Malawi – 19.89% Shareholding – A commercial bank licensed by the Reserve Bank of Malawi.

=== Asset Management ===
- NICO Asset Managers Limited – Blantyre, Malawi – 100% Shareholding – Offering investment management services.

=== Technology ===
- NICO Technologies Limited – Blantyre, Malawi – 100% Shareholding – Provider of IT solutions to the public sector, corporate and individual clients across Malawi.

=== Property ===
- Group Fabricators & Manufacturers – Blantyre, Malawi – 100% Shareholding – A property holding company.
- ICON Properties Plc – Blantyre, Malawi – 62.71% Shareholding – A property holding company. The shares of ICON Properties Plc are listed on the MSE.
- Eris Properties Malawi Ltd – Blantyre, Malawi – 50% Shareholding – A property development company that owns and manages a number of commercial properties in Malawi. Eris Properties Malawi was founded in August 2017 as a Joint Venture between NICO Holdings and Eris Property Group, a subsidiary of Momentum Metropolitan Holdings.
- Blantyre Hotels plc – Blantyre, Malawi – 34.52% Shareholding – A Malawian based hospitality company. The Company’s hotel operations are managed by Protea Hotels and Inns Limited of South Africa (Protea Hotels) under a management contract.

Other companies where NICO holdings controls more than 5% of the issued equity interest include Sanlam Uganda, Old Mutual, National Bank of Malawi plc, National Investment Trust plc, Telekom Networks Malawi plc, Chibuku Products Limited and Natswitch Limited.

== Ownership ==
The shares of the stock of NICO Holdings Plc are traded on the Malawi Stock Exchange, under the symbol: NICO. As of 31 December 2020, the shareholding in the company's stock, was as depicted in the table below:

NICO Holdings Limited Stock Ownership
Rank	Name of Owner	Percentage Ownership
1	Africap LLC	27.91%
2	Botswana Insurance Holdings Limited	25.10%
3	NICO Company Employees Share Ownership Scheme	1.10%
4	Other Local & International Investors	45.89
	Total	100.00%

== See also ==
- Malawi Stock Exchange
- NBS Bank Plc
- Botswana Insurance Holdings Limited
- Sanlam
