= Choppies =

Botswanan grocery retailer

Choppies Enterprises Limited
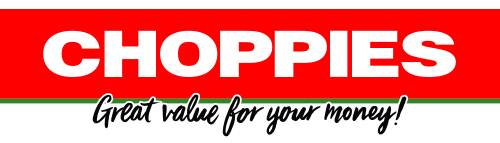
- Type: Public limited company
- Traded as: BwSE: CHOPPIES; JSE: CHP
- Industry: Retailing, Fast-moving consumer goods
- Founded: 1986; 40 years ago (Lobatse, Botswana)
- Headquarters: Gaborone, Botswana
- Number of locations: 161 stores
- Area served: Botswana, Zambia, Namibia
- Key people: Uttum Corea - Chairman Farouk Ismail - Deputy Chairman Ramachandran Ottapathu - Chief Executive Officer Vidya Sanooj - Acting CFO Tom Pritchard - Independent Non-Executive Director Carol Jean Harward - Independent Non-Executive Director
- Products: Hyper stores, Super stores and Value stores
- Services: Pre-Paid Utilities and Mobile, Bill payments, Tickets, Mobile starter packs, Money transfers.
- Revenue: ▲BWP 5.42 billion (half year ending Dec 20)
- Operating income: ▲BWP 1.3 billion (half year ending Dec 20)
- Net income: ▼BWP 139 million(half year ending Dec 19)
- Number of employees: 9 385 (As of December 2020)
- Website: choppiesgroup.com

Choppies Enterprises Limited is a Botswana multinational supermarket retailer headquartered in Gaborone, Botswana. The retailer initially sold only food-based goods (both fresh groceries and wholesale long-life foods) and other fast-moving consumer goods. By 2024, Choppies had 161 stores in 4 countries.

Choppies became a listed company on the Botswana Stock Exchange on January 26, 2012, and is a constituent of the BSE Domestic Company Index with an approximate market capitalization of P2.4 billion as of December 20, 2012.

== History ==
Choppies was founded in 1986 with a single store, Wayside Supermarket (Proprietary) Limited, in Lobatse by the Chopdat family. A second store was opened in 1993.

By 1999, the company operated only two stores. Since then, it has grown to become a dominant player in Botswana’s fast-moving consumer goods (FMCG) industry. The management team includes founding members Mr. Farouk Ismail, the current Deputy Chairman, and Mr. Ramachandaran Ottapathu, the current CEO. Both are major shareholders, each holding 34.2% of the company’s shares. In 2003, the group consolidated its operations under one structure, having previously operated under various franchise names.

Due to its exponential growth since 1999, there was growing demand for Choppies to be listed on the national stock exchange. The management team agreed, and the company was listed on the Botswana Stock Exchange on January 26, 2012. Grant Thornton was appointed to oversee the administration of the initial public offering, which saw 1.2 billion shares listed at BWP 1.15 per share, with 25% offered to the public. The IPO was the largest in the exchange’s history, raising BWP 350 million through the IPO and private placement, and was oversubscribed by up to 400%.

In 2008, Choppies opened its first store in Zeerust, South Africa, marking its expansion into the North West region. A South African distribution centre was launched in Rustenburg in September 2012 to serve the South African stores. In 2014, the group established its first distribution centre in Zimbabwe. The company completed its secondary listing on the Johannesburg Stock Exchange on May 27, 2015. By the end of 2015 Zambian operations began and in early 2016 saw the acquisition of Jwayelani group in Durban, South Africa. Kenyan acquisition of Ulkwala group was also carried out in early 2016. As part of long term growth plan the group opened its first store in Tanzania and Mozambique in 2017.

In 2020, Choppies closed its stores in South Africa, Mozambique, Kenya and Tanzania.

As of 2026, Choppies had 314 stores across three countries countries.

== Operations ==
=== Distribution and supply ===
Choppies' distribution centres function as a central sourcing for Choppies stores. The company's top 200 products are delivered in bulk to the distribution centres and then distributed from there to the stores. Other products are delivered from the source to the stores directly. Choppies operates two distribution centres in Botswana; one in the International Commerce Park in Gaborone, and the other in Lobatse. A new 10,000m^{2}

Welldone (Proprietary) Limited, a wholly owned subsidiary of the Choppies Group, is a logistics company that supports the day-to-day operations of the stores.

== Criticism ==
Choppies has attracted criticism from the public in the past due to salary discrepancy. Employees such as cashiers and packers claim to earn less than P900 a month, whilst executives such as the CEO and Deputy Chairman earn more than P30 000 000.00 per annum. This has attracted outrage as the company is historically very profitable yet is not rewarding the lower-skilled workers on terms they consider fair to their efforts.

== See also ==
- Sefalana
- Square Eats
- Shoprite (retailer)
- Checkers (supermarket chain)
- List of supermarket chains in Botswana
