= Engen Botswana Limited =

- Company type: Public
- Traded as: BwSE: ENGEN
- ISIN: BW0000000058
- Industry: Energy, Oil
- Revenue: BWP 2,236m (2015)
- Operating income: BWP 163m (2015)
- Net income: BWP 110m (2015)
- Website: engen.co.bw

Engen Botswana Limited is a downstream petroleum company. Engen's principal activity includes petrochemical investments and property operations. They market through a retail network.

== Board of directors ==
The current board of directors includes:

- Dr S Ndzinge-Chairman
- AM Bryce
- C Monga-Managing Director
- A Siwawa
- F Kotze
- V Bvumbi
- R. Mathews
- C. Mareka
