= Thapelo Tsheole =

Thapelo Tsheole is a Botswana executive and entrepreneur. He is the chief executive officer of the Botswana Stock Exchange, chairman of Committee of SADC Stock Exchanges and president of the African Securities Exchanges.

== Background ==
Tsheole was born in Mochudi, Botswana. He attained a Bachelor of Social Sciences from the University of Botswana and a Master of Commerce in Financial Markets from Rhodes University in South Africa. He also holds a Masters Degree in Business Administration from the Graduate School of Business at University of Cape Town and he also studied several financial markets programmes including a Leadership Development Programme at the University of Stellenbosch Business School.

Tsheole began his career in 2003 when he joined the Bank of Botswana as a Dealer in Forex and Money Markets and left in 2007 to join Botswana Stock Exchange where he started as Product Development Manager up to 2014.

Tsheole was appointed deputy CEO of the Botswana Stock Exchange Limited in 2014 then in January 2016 he was appointed CEO. In 2017 he joined the Africa Integrated Reporting Committee, a joint initiative between Pan African Federation of Accountants and World Bank.

In 2020, Tsheole was appointed vice president of the African Securities Exchanges Association then he became president in 2022. In 2023 he was appointed Global PSSL as strategic advisor and reviewer for UN Pathways. He is also a member of The Institute of Financial Markets of South Africa and the Institute of Directors in South Africa.

Tsheole introduced the first Exchanged Traded Funds (ETFs) in Botswana history and in September 2018, he was recognised with the Presidential Order of Meritorious Service which was awarded by the President of the Republic of Botswana.

== Positions ==
- Board Member - The African Comprehensive HIV/AIDS Partnerships (ACHAP Inc) 2015 - 2017
- Board Member - The African Comprehensive HIV/AIDS Partnerships Botswana 2015 - 2017
- Board member - Botswana Accountancy Oversight Authority 2016-2020
- Board Member - Medicines Regulatory Authority of Botswana 2016 - 2018
- Board Member - African Securities Exchanges Association (ASEA) 2016
- Board Member - Pan African Federation of Accountants 2016 - 2021
- Board Chair - Special Economic Zones Authority (SEZA) 2017 - 2021
- Chairman of the Committee of SADC Stock Exchanges (CoSSE) 2018
