= Angel Wainaina =

Kenyan actress (1983–2009)

Angela Wainaina
- Born: 1983; Nairobi, Kenya
- Died: 28 January 2009 (aged 25–26); Nairobi, Kenya
- Other name: Angel Wainaina
- Occupation: Actress

Angela "Angel" Wainaina (1983 – 28 January 2009) was a Kenyan actress, radio presenter and rapper.

== Life ==
Wainaina was born 1983 in Kawangware, a slum of Nairobi, Kenya. She joined a drama club at Kambui High School. She was a runner up at the Miss Kenya competition in 2005. She was a poet and underground rapper. She played Sergeant Maria in the popular television show "Cobra Squad".

On 15 January 2007, she began working for Ghetto Radio, as Kenya's first female MC. Her show "Chanuka Dada" was very popular, and she was well known for her energetic social advocacy. She was awarded the Young Women African Summit's media award.

== Death ==
Wainaina died on 28 January 2009 in the Nakumatt supermarket fire. Her funeral was held at the Holy Family Cathedral in Nairobi.
