= Letshego Bank Namibia =

Bank of Namibia

Coordinates: 22°34′19″S 17°05′23″E

- Type: Private
- Industry: Financial services
- Founded: 2002
- Headquarters: Windhoek, Namibia
- Key people: Ester Kali (CEO)
- Products: Loans, transaction accounts, savings, investments, debit cards
- Parent: Letshego Holdings Limited
- Website: www.letshego.com/country/namibia/

Letshego Bank Namibia is a commercial bank in Namibia. It is licensed by the Bank of Namibia, the central bank and national banking regulator.

== History ==
The institution was established in 2002 as Edu Loan Namibia. In August 2008, Letshego Holdings Limited (LHL), a Botswana Stock Exchange (BSE) listed entity, acquired majority shareholding in Edu Loan. The company re-branded to Letshego Financial Services Namibia, to reflect its shareholding.

In July 2014, Letshego Namibia was awarded a provisional banking license, which allowed them to make salary loans, with installment loan payments deducted directly from the borrower's paycheck by the employer. In July 2016, the bank was granted a full unrestricted banking licence.

== Location ==
The headquarters of the bank are located at 18 Schwerinsburg Street, in Windhoek, the capital and largest city in Namibia. The bank maintains a total of 15 branches in various urban centers in the country, as at August 2016.

== Ownership ==
Letshego Bank Namibia is a 100 percent subsidiary of Letshego Holdings Namibia Limited (LHN). The shares of the stock of Letshego Holdings Namibia Limited are traded on the NSX, under the symbol LNH. As at December 2022, the shareholding in the group's stock was as depicted in the table below:

Letshego Holdings Namibia Limited stock ownership
Rank	Name of owner	Percentage ownership
1	Letshego Holdings Limited	78.46
2	Kumwe Investment Holdings Limited	12.00
3	Other local & international investors	9.54
	Total	100.00

== See also ==
- List of banks in Namibia
