= Letshego Bank Tanzania =

Letshego Bank (T) Limited
- Type: Private
- Industry: Financial services
- Founded: 2011
- Headquarters: Dar es Salaam, Tanzania
- Key people: Claude Falgon, chairman
- Products: Loans, checking, savings, investments, debit cards
- Total assets: TSh 15.3 billion (US$8.7 million) (March 2015)
- Number of employees: 179 (2014)
- Website: www.advansbanktanzania.com

Letshego Bank Tanzania Limited, commonly known as Letshego Bank is a commercial bank in Tanzania, licensed by Bank of Tanzania, the central bank and national banking regulator.

== Overview ==
Letshego Bank Tanzania is a commercial bank regulated by the Bank of Tanzania. Its social mission is to provide suitable and sustainable financial services to micro, small, and medium-sized entrepreneurs, and to low and medium income employees. It operates as a microfinance bank. As of March 2014, the shareholders equity was valued at about TSh 11.4 billion (US$6.5 million or €5.2 million). At that time, customer deposits totalled approximately TSh 3.9 billion (US$2.23 million or €1.8 million). It is estimated that the bank's total assets in March 2014 totaled TSh 15.3 billion (US$8.7 million or €7 million).

== History ==
The bank, then known as Advans Bank Tanzania, received a commercial banking license from the Bank of Tanzania in May 2010. In February 2011, the bank opened its first branch in Dar es Salaam, the commercial capital city of Tanzania, and the largest city in that East African country. Opening with a staff of eighteen, the bank planned to open more branches in Dar es Salaam and other areas of the country.

== Ownership ==
The institution opened in 2011 as Advans Bank Tanzania, a joint venture between Advans SA, a venture capital firm registered in Luxembourg as majority shareholder (70 percent), and Netherlands Development Finance Company (FMO) (30 per cent). Advans SA aims to establish microfinance financial institutions in emerging economies. Founded in 2005, Advans SA owns microfinance institutions in the Democratic Republic of the Congo, Cameroon, Ghana, Cambodia, Pakistan, Côte d'Ivoire, and Tanzania. As of March 2011, Advans SA had invested in excess of US$76 million (€55 million) in the countries where they operate. In November 2015, Letshego Holdings Limited of Botswana acquired 75 per cent in the bank by investing US$7 million in new shares.

The table below depicts the shareholding within Letshego Bank Tanzania, as of November 2015.

Letshego Bank (T) Limited stock ownership
Rank	Name of owner	Percentage ownership
1	Letshego Holdings Limited of Botswana	75.0
1	Advans SA of Luxembourg	17.5
2	Netherlands Development Finance Company of Netherlands	7.5
	Total	100.00

== Branch network ==
Letshego Bank maintains a network of branches at the following locations:

- Manzese Branch - 93 Morogoro Road, Manzese Darajani, Dar es Salaam (main branch)
- Kariakoo Branch - Kariakoo Street at Lumumba Street, Kariakoo, Dar es Salaam
- Temeke Branch - Opposite Temeke Primary Court, Temeke, Dar es Salaam
- Mwanza Branch - Lumumba Road, Opposite Mayi Hotel, Mwanza
- Mbeya Branch - Soweto, Former Royal Zambezi, Mbeya

== Governance ==
The acting chief executive officer of the bank is Andrew Charles Tarimo.

== See also ==
- List of banks in Tanzania
- List of banks in Africa
- Bank of Tanzania
- Economy of Tanzania
- Advans Banque Congo
- Letshego Microfinance Uganda
