= Deokali =

- Industrial area
- Nickname: DKL
- Interactive map of Deokali
- Coordinates: 25°32′35.94″N 83°19′58.89″E
- Country: India
- State: Uttar Pradesh
- District: Ayodhya
- City: Ayodhya

Government
  - Type: Industrial area
- Elevation: 1,346 m (4,416 ft)

Population (2011)
  - Total: 25,790
  - Rank: 8

Languages
  - Official: Hindi, Awadhi, English
- Time zone: UTC+5:30 (IST)
- PIN: 224001
- Vehicle registration: UP-42
- Sex ratio: 1000/1096 ♂/♀

Deokali is an industrial area in Ayodhya city in the Indian state of Uttar Pradesh and is a sub post office of Ayodhya.

== Demographics ==
As of the 2011 India census, Deokali had a population of 25,790. Males constituted 51% of the population and females 49%. Deokali had an average literacy rate of 62%, higher than the national average of 59.5%; male literacy was 71%, and female literacy was 52%. 17% of the population was under 6 years of age.

Religions in Deokali
Religion	Percent
Hindus	90%
Muslims	1%
Jains	9%
Others†	0%
Distribution of religions †Includes Sikhs (0%), Buddhists (<0%).
