= Olympia Capital Holdings =

Holding company

Olympia Capital Holdings Ltd
- Type: Public company; NSE: OCH
- Industry: Manufacturer, interior, construction
- Founded: 1968
- Headquarters: L.R. No 209/5532, off Nanyuki Road, Industrial Area Nairobi, Kenya
- Area served: Sub-Saharan Africa
- Key people: Michael Matu; CEO
- Products: PVC, pumps, floor tiles, tyres
- Revenue: ▲ Ksh.501 million/= (2019/20)
- Net income: ▲KSh.45 million/= (2019/20)
- Total assets: ▲KSh.2.5 billion/= (2019/20)
- Website: www.ochl.co.ke

Olympia Capital Holdings Limited is a holding company comprising several businesses in East and Southern Africa. The company's headquarters are located in Nairobi, Kenya, with subsidiaries in Kenya, Botswana and South Africa. The company is listed on the Nairobi Securities Exchange (NSE) and trades as OCH. In addition to the NSE listing, its Botswana subsidiary Olympia Capital Corporation is listed on the Botswana Stock Exchange.

== History ==
Olympia Capital Holdings Limited, formerly Dunlop Kenya Limited (DKL), was initially established as a branch of Dunlop United Kingdom, in Kenya in 1968, then a British multinational to carry out the business of manufacture of vinyl floor tiles, adhesives and sports equipment. In 1970, the company was formally registered in Kenya. It was listed at the Nairobi Stock Exchange in 1976.

In 1999, Dunlop Industries Limited (DIL) was registered as a fully owned subsidiary of DKL to continue with the business of the parent company and allow DKL to concentrate on investments.

Olympia Capital Holdings Limited (OCCL) purchased Olympia Capital Corporation in Botswana in 2001. Through the newly acquired entity, the group was able to acquire 100% shareholding of Kalahari Floor Tiles (KFT) in the city of Gaborone, Botswana. KFT is the largest tile manufacturer in Southern Africa. In 2005, OCCL Botswana was listed on the Botswana Stock exchange, as a subsidiary of OCHL Kenya.

In 2006 Olympia Capital Holdings Ltd acquired majority control of Avon Rubber Company, which dealt in the manufacturing and distribution of tyre products. It acquired majority control of Mather + Platt Kenya Ltd in 2008, which is now the leading fire and mechanical engineering contracting company in East Africa.

In 2014, Olympia Capital Botswana acquired 100% of the real estate company Gaborone Enterprises in Botswana, which have an array of commercial and residential properties in Botswana and South Africa.

== Overview ==
OCHL oversees operations of its subsidiaries including Avon Rubber Company, Mather and Platt Limited and Olympia Capital Corporation Limited. In Kenya, its subsidiaries are Mather+Platt (K) Ltd, the leading fire systems and water pumps provider in East Africa; and Avon Centre, the real estate division of OCHL. Olympia Capital also has a major stake in Heri Limited, which has an array of real estate properties in Kenya. Owing to growing losses, the group divested from its fully owned floor tile and adhesives manufacturing company, Dunlop Industries Limited.

The company, through Olympia Capital Corporation (Pty), a publicly listed company in the Botswana Stock Exchange (BSE), has interests in Kalahari Floor Tiles (Pty) Limited and Gaborone Enterprises (Pty) Limited, both in Botswana. Kalahari Floor Tiles is the leading tile manufacturer in Southern Africa. It is also involved in the manufacturing of industrial and commercial cleaning chemicals. Gaborone Enterprise is the real estate section of OCCL, with residential and commercial properties. Prior to their closure, OCCL also owned two South African entities: Plush Products (Pty) in Johannesburg and Natural Wooden Products (NatWood) in Cape Town.

In line with its listing in the investment segment of the exchange, the group looks to diversify its services and product offerings and to serve a broader geographical area. OCHL is keen to capitalize on the available investment opportunities beyond the building material and property sectors.

== Member companies ==
Olympia has significant ownership stakes in various firms, including:

- Dunlop Kenya Limited – Nairobi, Kenya, 100% shareholding. The largest manufacturer of vinyl floor tiles and vinyl sheeting in East and Central Africa; its website states that it is the foremost vinyl floor tile manufacturer in Sub-Saharan Africa.
- Mather + Platt Kenya Limited – Nairobi, Kenya, 56.70% shareholding. Incorporated in 1972, the company is a leading fire and mechanical engineering contracting company, as well as a distributor of high quality pumps in East Africa.
- Avon Rubber Company (K) Limited – Nairobi, Kenya, 47.50% shareholding. Manufacture and sale of industrial rubber.
- Olympia Capital Corporation – Gaborone, Botswana, 50.50% shareholding. Holding company for the Southern Africa Operations. Listed on the Botswana Stock Exchange.
- Kalahari Floor Tiles Pty – Gaborone, Botswana, 100% shareholding through Olympia Capital Corporation. The largest manufacturer of vinyl floor tiles and vinyl sheeting in Southern Africa. It is also involved in home improvement goods such as aluminum window frames, rubber and curtains.
- Gaborone Enterprises (Pty) Limited – Gaborone, Botswana, 100% shareholding through Kalahari Floor Tiles Pty, an industrial property holding company.
- Tiespro (171) Trading Pty Ltd/a Natwood Africa – Cape Town, South Africa. Held through Olympia Capital Corporation. Suppliers of home, bathroom and kitchen fittings and accessories.

== Ownership ==
The shares of Olympia Capital Holdings are listed on the Nairobi Stock Exchange (NSE). The shareholding of OCH is as follows:

Olympia Capital Holdings stock ownership

Rank	Name of owner	Percentage ownership
1	Dunlop Properties Limited	26.20
2	Paul Wanderi Ndungu	11.99
3	Karen Enterprises Limited	9.09
4	First Ten Limited	5.90
5	Asteria Company Limited	2.62
6	Joel Kamau Kibe	2.37
7	Scottlink Limited	2.21
8	Michael Maina Matu	1.97
9	Eliud Matu Wamae	1.55
10	Mobicom Kenya Limited	1.12
11	Others via Nairobi Securities Exchange	38.28
	Total	100.00
