= Uchumi Supermarkets =

Kenyan supermarket chain

- Type: Public company
- Traded as: KN: UCHM
- Industry: Retail trade
- Founded: 1975
- Headquarters: Nairobi, Kenya
- Key people: John Karani; Chairperson; Mohamed Mohamed; Chief Executive Officer
- Products: Supermarkets
- Revenue: Net Sales:US$165.4 million (KES:14.458 billion) (2014)
- Net income: ▲ Aftertax: US$4.398+ million (KES:384 million) (2014)
- Total assets: US$78.8 million (KES:6.885 billion) (2014)
- Number of employees: 50 (2020)
- Website: www.uchumisupermarkets.co.ke

Uchumi Supermarkets, often referred to simply as Uchumi, is a Kenyan supermarket chain. The word uchumi means "economy" in Swahili.

== Overview ==
Uchumi is headquartered in Kenya. As of April 2019, Uchumi is one of a number of Kenyan supermarket chains that serve Kenya, including market-leaders Naivas, Quick Mart and Carrefour. In June 2014, the company's assets were about US$78.8 million (KES:6.885 billion), with shareholder equity of approximately US$38.4 million (KES:3.357 billion). By December 2020 there were only three stores in Kenya. As of 2025 there was only one store in operation in Nairobi.

== History ==
The company was founded in 1975, as a public limited liability company, by three Kenyan parastatal companies: Industrial and Commercial Development Corporation, Kenya Wine Agencies Limited (KWAL), and Kenya National Trading Corporation. The main objective at the time was to create outlets for the equitable distribution of commodities and to create retail outlets for Kenyan manufactures. In 1976, Uchumi's shareholders signed a management contract with Standa SPA, an Italian supermarket chain, to train Kenyans to run the new enterprise. The company's shares were publicly listed on the Nairobi Stock Exchange (NSE) in 1992.

Uchumi closed down, albeit temporarily, and was placed in receivership during June 2006 after 30 years of business. It was simultaneously de-listed from the NSE. At the time, its closure was described as "one of the greatest corporate disasters in independent Kenya history". A government-led rescue plan, however, was initiated and consequently five Uchumi outlets, all in Nairobi, were reopened on 15 July 2006 under interim management and a caretaker administrator.

By January 2011, the retail chain had returned to profitability and applied to the Kenya Capital Markets Authority to re-list its shares on the NSE. Approval to re-list on the NSE was granted in May 2011 and trading in the shares of Uchumi resumed on 31 May 2011.

== Ownership ==
As of July 2014, the shares of stock of the retail chain are publicly listed on the NSE, where they trade under the symbol "UCHM". The shares are also cross-listed on the Rwanda Stock Exchange and the Uganda Securities Exchange. The company obtained regulatory approval to cross-list on the Dar es Salaam Stock Exchange, effective 15 August 2014. The six largest shareholders in the company as of April 2015 were:

Uchumi Supermarkets Stock Ownership
Rank	Name of Owner	Percentage Ownership
1	Jamii Bora Bank	15.8
2	Kenya's Ministry of Trade	14.6
3	Paul Wanderi Ndung’u	5.4
4	KWAL Holdings	4.3
5	Equity Nominees: Ac:00111	4.1
6	Karim Jamal	2.3
7	16th Internationalé de Háfs	1.1
8	Others via the Stock Exchanges in eastern Africa	52.3
	Total	100.00

== Leadership ==
The current CEO is Lawrence Ngao with Edwin Kiplimo being the head of marketing.

== Branches ==
As of April 2019, the supermarket chain maintained Six outlets in Kenya:

=== List of Branches in Kenya ===
1. Lang’ata Hyper: Carnivore Way, opposite Uhuru Gardens
2. Uchumi Unicity Branch: Nairobi Unicity Mall
3. Kitengela Branch: Kajiado Road

All other Stores were closed down.

== Closure of non-Kenyan stores ==
In June 2015, Uchumi fired its chief executive officer and chief financial officer at the time, for "misconduct and gross negligence". In July 2015, the company hired a Nairobi-based consulting firm to probe employee theft at the retail chain. In August 2015, a new CEO was hired. In October 2015, the store chain closed down all its stores in Uganda and Tanzania, citing unprofitability. In the process, 900 former employees were laid off in both countries, of whom 400 were in Uganda.

In November 20, 2025 Uchumi announced its comeback by opening a new store at Unicity Mall Nairobi.

== See also ==
- East African Community
- Economy of Kenya
- List of supermarket chains in Kenya
- List of supermarket chains in Africa
