= Caprabo =

Supermarket company in Spain and Andorra

- Revenue: 2,058,000,000 (2017)

Caprabo is a supermarket company in Spain and Andorra, with supermarkets and hypermarkets in mainland Spain, the Balearic Islands and the Canary Islands, as well as internationally in Andorra. It operates an online shopping and delivery service in Spain.

Caprabo was acquired by Eroski in 2007. It had a turnover of 1.671 million euros in 2008.
