= Supermercados Tu Alteza =

Canarian supermarket chain

- Company type: Subsidiary
- Industry: Retail
- Headquarters: Canary Islands
- Products: Bakery, dairy, deli, frozen foods, general grocery, meat, pharmacy, produce, seafood, snacks, liquor
- Parent: Comercial Jesuman
- Website: www.comercialjesuman.es/supermercados-tu-alteza/

Supermercados Tu Alteza (also known locally plainly as Tu Alteza, a name which translates to Your Highness) is a Canarian chain of supermarkets, which has 60 supermarkets operating in the Canary Islands. The supermarket's parent company is Comercial Jesuman.

== History ==
Both Comercial Jesuman and the Tu Alteza supermarkets were founded by Jesus Hernandez Guzman. In 2005, one of his descendants, Jose Ignacio Hernandez, took over as the conglomerate's only administrator, creating an internal battle for control of the company between him and Hernandez Guzman's other descendants, namely Juan Jesus and Jose Manuel Hernandez.

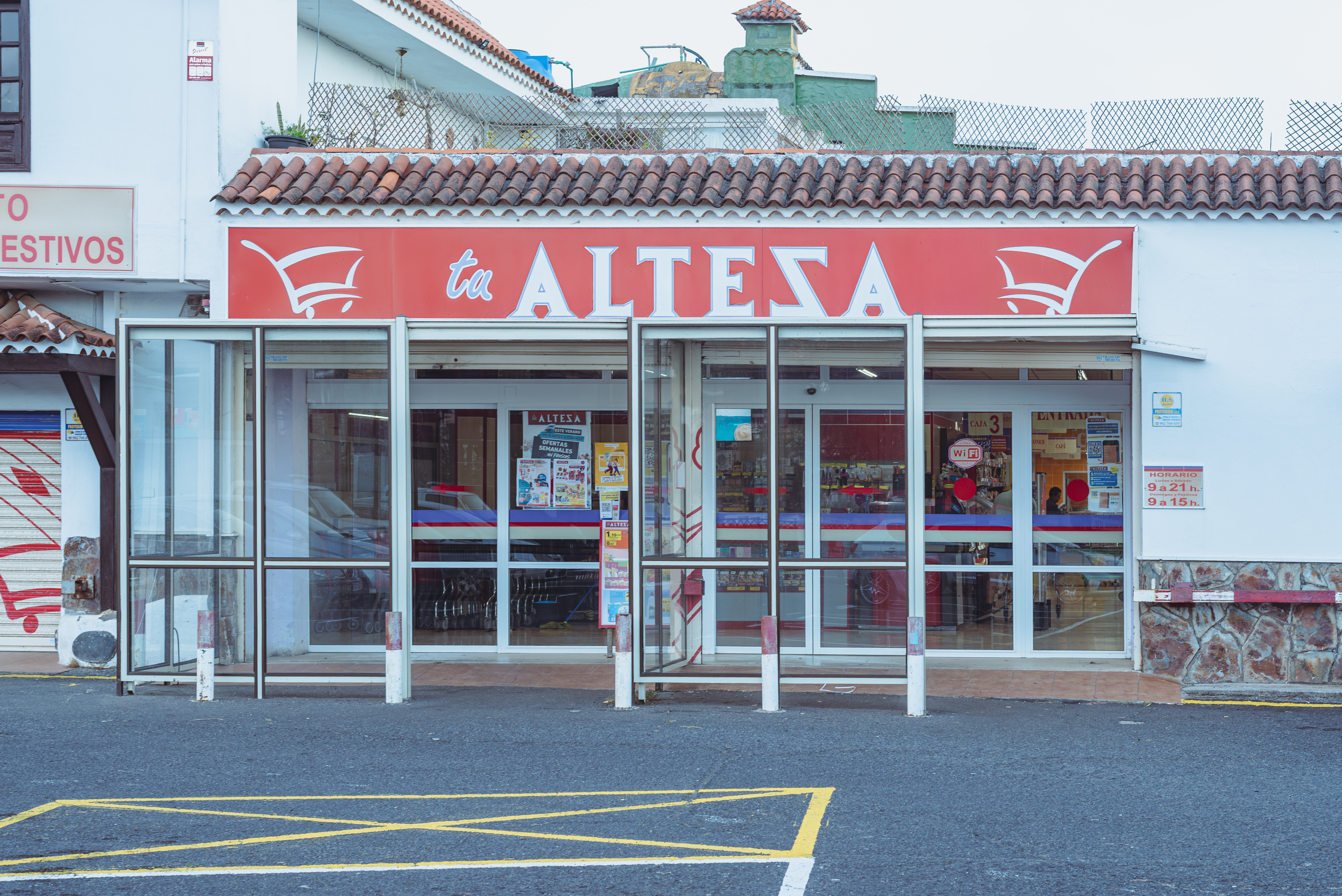
Alteza supermarket in El Rosario

== Sponsorships ==
The supermarket chain sponsors the Tenerife Central women's basketball club.

== Competitors ==
Competitors in the Canary Islands include Alcampo.
