= Letshego Microfinance Uganda =

Microfinance institution in Uganda

Coordinates: 00°19′23″N 32°35′47″E

Letshego Uganda Limited
- Company type: Private
- Industry: Financial services
- Founded: 2005
- Headquarters: Kololo, Kampala, Uganda
- Key people: Giles Germany Aijukwe chief executive officer
- Products: Loans, savings accounts
- Total assets: US$36.4 million (UGX:91 billion) (2013)
- Website: Homepage

Letshego Microfinance Uganda, (also Letshego Microfinance Uganda Limited (LMUL)), whose official name is Letshego Uganda Limited, is a Tier IV microfinance institution in Uganda.

LMUL is a microfinance company that offers SME loans, mortgage loans, and education loans, among other forms of lending. The company also offers savings accounts.

As of December 2013, LMUL's assets were valued at UGX:91 billion (US$36.4 million) and it had a loan portfolio of UGX:58 billion ($23.2 million). Total customer deposits stood at UGX:43 billion ($17.2 million). At that time, the institution had 32 branches.

== History ==
The institution was founded in 2005 as Micro Provident Uganda Limited. In 2012, the business re-branded to Letshego Uganda Limited. In 2013, Letshego Holdings Limited acquired control of Micro Africa Limited, a Kenya-based microfinance institution with subsidiaries in Kenya, Rwanda, Uganda, and South Sudan. The two operations in Uganda were merged to form Letshego Microfinance Uganda Limited.

== Location ==
LMUL's headquarters are located at 9 Wampewo Avenue on Kololo Hill, a business and residential neighborhood within the city of Kampala, Uganda's capital. This is approximately 3 kilometres (2 mi) north-east of the city center. The coordinates of the institution's headquarters are 00°19'23.0"N, 32°35'47.0"E (Latitude:0.323056; Longitude:32.596389).

== Ownership ==
The company is majority owned by Letshego Holdings Limited, a publicly traded holding company of financial services subsidiaries in Botswana, Burundi, Eswatini, Kenya, Lesotho, Mozambique, Namibia, Nigeria, Rwanda, Tanzania, and Uganda.

== Branch network ==
The branch network of LMUL included the following locations as of August 2016.

1. Kololo Branch - 9 Wampewo Avenue, Kololo, Kampala Head Office
2. Arua Branch - 47 Adumi Road, Arua
3. Apac Branch - Hospital Road, Apac
4. Bundibugyo Branch - 2 Vanilla Street, Bundibugyo
5. Bushenyi Branch - 9 High Street, Bushenyi
6. Tororo Branch - 5-17 Nagongera Road, Tororo
7. Gulu Branch - 13 Awere Road, Gulu
8. Iganga Branch - 4B Obojja Road, Iganga
9. Ibanda Branch - 12 Bufunda Road, Ibanda
10. Jinja Branch 1 - 54 Iganga Road, Jinja
11. Jinja Branch 2 - 51-53 Lubas Road, Jinja
12. Soroti Branch - 59B Gweri Road, Soroti
13. Mbale Branch - BCU Building, 12 Manafwa Road, Mbale
14. Kamuli Branch - 14 Gabula Kitimbo Road, Kamuli
15. Kabwohe Branch - 67 Mbarara-Ishaka Road, Kabwohe
16. Kajjansi Branch - 383 Kampala-Entebbe Road, Kajjansi
17. Kanungu Branch - Independence Road, Kanungu
18. Kasese Branch - Rwenzori Road, Kasese
19. Kibaale Branch - 1 Isuunga Road, Kibaale
20. Kiboga Branch - Kampala-Hoima Road, Kiboga
21. Kireka Branch - 336 Kampala-Jinja Road, Kireka
22. Kisozi Complex Branch - 8 Kisozi Complex, Kyaggwe Road, Nakasero, Kampala
23. Kisoro Branch - 30 Kabale Road, Kisoro
24. Kitgum Branch - 107 Uhuru Drive, Kitgum
25. Kotido Branch - 20 London Road, Kotido
26. Kyotera Branch - 238 Bukoba Road, Kyotera
27. Kumi Branch - 14 Oumo Road, Kumi
28. Lira Branch - 114 Oyam Road, Lira
29. Luweero Branch - 739 Kampala-Gulu Road, Luweero
30. Masaka Branch - 16 Edward Street, Masaka
31. Masindi Branch - 91 Masindi Port Road, Masindi
32. Fort Portal Branch - 3 Rukidi III Street, Fort Portal
33. Mayuge Branch - 11 Bugade Road, Mayuge
34. Kapchorwa Branch 1 - 32A Kapchorwa-Mbale Road, Kapchorwa
35. Kapchorwa Branch 2 -23 Gogonya Road, Kapchorwa
36. Mbarara Branch - 16-18 Bananuka Drive, Mbarara
37. Mityana Branch - 425 Mityana Road, Mityana
38. Moroto Branch - Moroto-Napak Road, Moroto
39. Moyo Branch - Laura House, Besia Village, Moyo
40. Mpigi Branch - 195 Butambala Road, Mpigi
41. Nateete Branch - Marvin House, 962 Kampala-Masaka Road, Nateete
42. Nebbi Branch - 19 Arua Road, Nebbi
43. Ntungamo Branch - 8 Kabale Road
44. Rukungiri Branch - 31 Rubabo Road, Rukungiri
45. Kabale Branch - 88 Kisoro Road, Kabale
46. Koboko Branch - Samuel Baba Road, Koboko

== See also ==
- Banking in Uganda
- List of banks in Uganda
