= Tuskys =

Supermarket chain in Kenya

Coordinates: 01°20′05″S 36°53′38″E

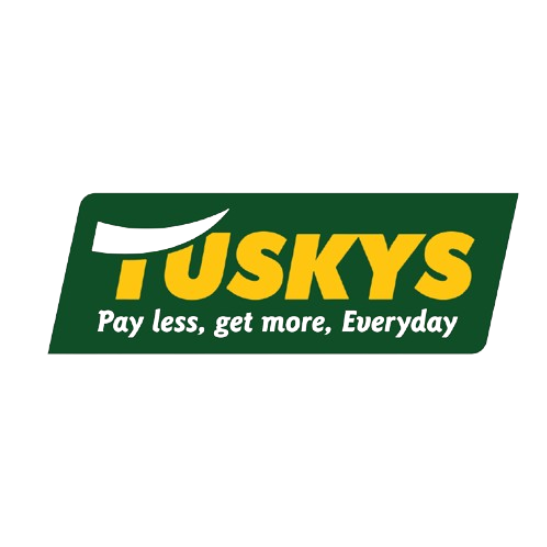
- Type: Private Family Owned
- Industry: Retail trade
- Founded: 1990
- Headquarters: Nairobi, Kenya
- Key people: Daniel Githua
- Products: Supermarkets
- Subsidiaries: In Kenya, and Uganda

Tuskys (formerly Tusker Mattress) was a Kenyan supermarket chain. It was one of the largest supermarket chains in the Great Lakes Area. It employed nearly 6,150 people—over 6,000 in Kenya and 150 in Uganda.

== Location ==
The head office of Tuskys was located at the Gami Properties Complex, along Mombasa Road, in Nairobi, the capital of Kenya.

== Overview ==
As of August 2018, Tuskys owned and operated sixty supermarkets in Kenya and Uganda. Tuskys employed more than 6,000 people in Kenya. As of July 2018, Tuskys had closed four stores in Kampala, Uganda and remained with three stores in Kampala, at Makerere, Ntinda and Kitintale.

== Ownership ==
Tuskys was a wholly Kenyan, privately held company owned by seven children of Joram Kamau, the founder of the business, who died in 2002. The table below summarizes the shareholding within the company as of August 2014. As of August 2020, the company has been placed under observation by the Competition Authority of Kenya (CAK). It faces a Ksh 2 million debt and the risk of insolvency unless it recapitalizes.

Tuskys Stock Ownership

Rank	Name of Owner	Percentage Ownership
1	John Kago	10.0
2	Samuel Kamau	17.5
3	Stephen Mukuha	14.5
4	Yusuf Mugweru	17.5
5	George Gachwe	10.5
6	Founder's Daughter I	10.0
7	Founder's Daughter II	10.0
	Total	100.00

== Other considerations ==
Beginning in April 2013, Tuskys entered into a private deal with Ukwala Supermarkets, a rival chain, whereby Tuskys would buy six Ukwala stores in the Nairobi area. To arrive at a fair price, Tuskys took over the management of two of the stores to assess traffic and commercial flow at those locations. The two chains did not consult the Competition Authority of Kenya (CAK), as required by law. When CAK learned of the transaction, the regulator stopped the deal and fined the two chains a total of KES 5.3 million (about US$38,000). CAK ordered the management arrangements to be reversed. When the supermarket chains did not move fast enough, CAK closed the two stores in question.

== Fallen retail giant ==
In July 2020, the Cabinet Secretary of Trade, Betty Maina, told The EastAfrican news center that the government of Kenya was closely monitoring Tuskys Supermarket, which was slowly sliding into financial trouble after failing to pay suppliers. The Kenya Association of Manufacturers, whose members form the bulk of Tuskys's suppliers, said the retailer is facing debt payment challenges and is flouting the joint Prompt Payment Code of Practice that provides for payment of Fast Moving Consumer Goods (FMCG) within 30 days from the date of the invoice, while other goods should be 45 days. Tuskys' proposal was to extend this to 150 days for goods supplied earlier than December 2019. It is argued that the retailer would be dishonoring its commitments to manufacturers, resulting in cash flow problems for them.

Tuskys (Tusker Mattresses LTD) has fallen from 64 to only 5 open stores. The remaining stores are a shell of the retail gem, with their sales yielding lower due to stock-outs as suppliers kept off. The margins from these stores are being wiped off as they are using diesel powered generators to provide power as Kenya Power have pulled the plug on them over pending bills settlement.

The retail giant is reported to be planning to relocate its headquarters from Nairobi's City Cabanas bus terminus to Athi River as the chain struggles to service rent. Tusky's exit from the Greenspan mall in Donholm has hit ICEA's investment arm, as their anchor tenant has had major financial difficulties. According to Ruth Okal, an investment manager at ICEA Lions Property, they started observing a strain in rental payments from Tuskys in mid-2019. It is reported that Tuskys has arrears of 26 million Kenyan shillings with the GreenSpan Mall as of the Q4 2020 billings. A distress process of surrender with the retailer is currently underway, with almost all rent arrears being cleared.

Sibling rivalry, aggressive debt-fueled expansions, and fierce competition are blamed for Tuskys' downward spiral in the subsection "How Tuskys lost its tusks." Tuskys' fierce sibling rivalry is evidenced by the third-generation grandkids of the founder, in the full glare of television cameras, hounding the CEO Dan Githua the same year Yusuf Mugweru took his stepbrother, Stephen Mukuha, to court for slapping him. The following year Stephen Mukuha and his other brother, George Gachwe, were arraigned in court over the theft of 1.64 billion from the retailer following investigations that started in February 2012 when Mugweru sounded the alarm over the theft of funds from Tuskys accounts. It is reported that attempts to reconcile the siblings have never worked out.

== See also ==
- List of supermarket chains in Kenya
- Economy of Kenya
