= DinoSol =

Spanish chain of supermarkets

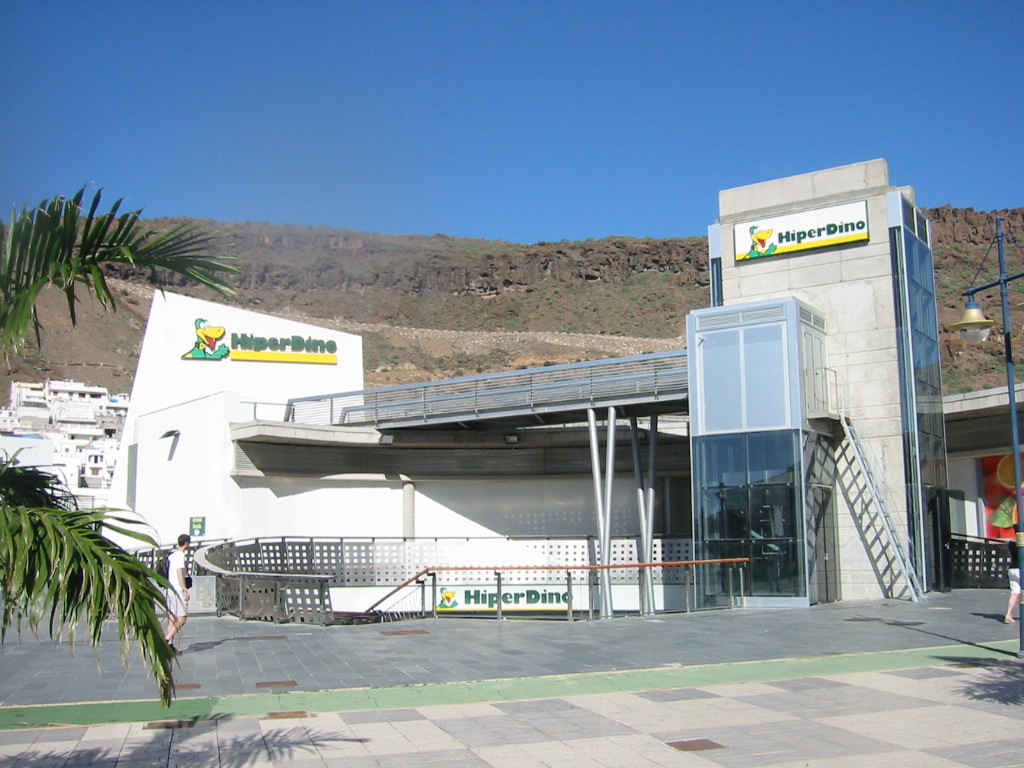
A HiperDino supermarket in Puerto de Mogán, Gran Canaria

Dinosol Supermercados S.L., trading as DinoSol, is a Spanish supermarket chain in the Canary Islands who is most known for its HiperDino supermarkets.

The current structure of the company dates back to 2012, when a group of Canary shareholders, which mainly consisted of AJA investments and the original founders, bought the company.

== History ==
In 1978, the Domínguez brothers established the brand HiperDino. In 1996, when the brand consisted of three stores, they sold it to Vista Capital, a venture in which Banco Santander participated. Vista Capital renamed the stores to Superdiplo. Subsequently, Dutch multinational Ahold bought the supermarkets and renamed it back to the HiperDino brand. However, Ahold suffered some serious losses and sold the business to English private equity firm Permira who renamed the wider group to Dinosol SL. In 2011, DinoSol's debt had mounted to more than 400 million euros, after which the company ended up in the hands of an extensive group of banks.

In 2012, a group of Canary shareholders, led by José Abraham Domínguez, Andrés Domínguez and Javier Puga, decided to buy DinoSol. In 2012, DinoSol agreed to sell the SuperSol chain to Agile Finance.

After taking control over the group, the Domínguez brothers and Javier Puga resumed the successful strategy from the past: low prices, alongside competitive and promotions focused on local products. Their company policy was focused on reaching an island society that suffered from high unemployment rates.

It didn’t take long before this new approach bore fruit. Predatory pricing paved the way for growth and the group regained its lost market share. One year after the acquisition, DinoSol became a well-performing company that generated more than 1,000 jobs.

In 2015, consultancy firm Stiga awarded Hiperdino a national prize concerning customer satisfaction, based on valuations by supermarket customers.

In 2019, Liga Canaria de Esports SL, a company dedicated to organizing live events, online competitions, digital entertainment, software development, audiovisual production, and technology projects was established as a part of the DinoSol Group and is based in Santa Cruz de Tenerife, Spain.

== Stores and formats ==
As of 2024, Grupo DinoSol boasts more than 200 locations over the Canary Islands, and employs over 6,000 people. The company includes:

- HiperDino, large supermarkets and hypermarkets with extensive offerings
- SuperDino, relatively small neighborhood supermarkets with less extensive offerings
- HiperDino Express, small supermarkets located in tourist area
- EcoDino10, ecological supermarket
- DinoShop11, stores inside BP gas stations
