= List of supermarket chains in Africa =

This is a list of supermarket chains in Africa.

The largest supermarket chains in Africa are the Shoprite group and Choppies.

International chains with the most supermarkets on the continent are Carrefour, Coopérative U, Auchan and SPAR.

== Angola ==
- Intermarket
- AngoMart
- AngoMart Mais
- Fresmart
- Nossa Casa
- Bompreço
- Continente
- Kero
- Maxi
- Megamart
- Nosso Super Supermarkets
- OK
- Shoprite
- Usave

== Benin ==
- Super U

== Botswana ==
- Checkers
- Choppies
- Friendly (OK franchise)
- Megamart
- Sefalana
- OK Foods Supermarket
- OK Grocer
- OK Minimark
- OK Value
- Pick 'n Pay
- Shoppers
- Shoprite
- Spar
- USave
- Woolworths

== Burkina Faso ==
- Marina Market
- Le Bon Samaritain
- Super U

== Burundi ==
- Au Bon Prix
- BMC Grocery
- T-2000

== Cameroon ==
- Super U
- Carrefour
- Casino

== Canary Islands ==
- Tu Alteza
- DinoSol

== Cape Verde ==
- Calu e Angela

== Central African Republic ==
- Dias Freres

== Chad ==
- Modern Market

== Comoros ==
- Mag Market
- Sawa Prix

== Republic of the Congo ==
- Super U
- Intermarché
- Park N Shop

== Democratic Republic of the Congo ==
- Carrefour

== Equatorial Guinea ==
- AJM Supermarkets
- EGTC Supermarkets
- Martinez Hermanos
- Sogech

== Eritrea ==
- Wikianos Supermarket

== Ethiopia ==
- Shoa Shopping Center
- Abadir Supermarkets
- Alle Supermarkets
- Fantu Supermarkets
- Leonardo Supermarkets
- Novis Supermarkets
- Savemore Supermarkets

== Gabon ==
- Super U
- Carrefour

== The Gambia ==
- Maroun's Supermarkets
- Safeway Supermarkets
- St. Mary's Food and Wine Supermarkets

== Ghana ==
- A&C Shopping
- Kwatsons
- Lulu Hypermarket
- Melcom Stores
- Palace
- Shoprite
- Woolworths
- Tesbury Ghana

== Guinea ==
- Super U
- Leader Price

== Ivory Coast ==
- Super U
- Carrefour
- Casino
- Civadis
- Lulu Hypermarket
- Sococé
- Auchan

== Lesotho ==
- OK
- Pick 'n Pay
- Shoprite
- USave

== Liberia ==
- Exclusive Supermarkets
- Stop 'n' Shop Supermarkets

== Libya ==
- Géant

== Madagascar ==
- Super U
- Carrefour

== Malawi ==
- Sana Malawi
- Shoprite
- SPAR
- Chipiku
- Superior Food Market
- Usave

== Mauritania ==
- LuLu Hypermarket

== Mauritius ==
- Super U
- Intermart Hyper (Partner of Intermarché-France).
- Jumbo (hypermarkets)
- Winner's supermarkets
- King Savers
- Lolo
- Food Lover's Market
- Dreamprice
- Savemart
- GSR supermarket (Store 2000, Popo Supermarket, etc., ...)
- Way supermarket (Londonway)
- Carrefour

== Mayotte ==
- Carrefour
- Sodicash
- Sodifram
- HyperDiscount
- SuperDiscount

== Mozambique ==
- KK Supermarkets
- Lulu Hypermarkets
- Pick 'n Pay Stores
- Royal Group Supermarkets
- Shoprite
- SPAR
- Taurus Supermarkets
- Woolworths

== Namibia ==
- Choppies
- Foodzone
- Checkers
- Hypersave
- Devland Metro Cash & Carry
- Sentra
- OK Grocer
- Shoprite
- SPAR
- Woermann Brock
- Woermann Supermarkets
- Usave
- Model

== Niger ==
- Haddad Supermarkets
- Marina Market
- Minimarket Azar

== Nigeria ==
- Marketsquare Supermarkets
- OjajaMore

== Réunion ==
- Carrefour
- Marché U
- Super U
- Superette BRP
- A

== Rwanda ==
- T-2000 Supermarkets
- Crystal Mini Market
- Simba Supermarkets
- BIG Supermarket (Be Indangamirwa Generation Supermarket)
- SAWA City Supermarket
- my250 Supermarket
- Ndoli Super Market
- Mr Price Group

== São Tomé and Príncipe ==
- Super Ckdo

== Senegal ==
- Auchan
- Casino Supermarkets
- Elydia
- Carrefour
- Super U

== Seychelles ==
- Grocers Supermarkets Pty Ltd, Orion Mall, Mahe
- Kannus Supermarkets
- Seychelles Trading Corporation (STC)
- SPAR

== Sierra Leone ==
- Choithram Supermarket
- Monoprix

== Somalia ==
- Al Osmani
- Carwada Bilan
- Daarasalaam
- Dool
- Father
- Midnimo
- Mama Taslim Grocery Store

== South Sudan ==
- JIT Mart
- Uchumi Supermarkets - In development

== Eswatini ==
- OK
- Shoprite
- Pick 'n Pay
- SPAR
- Easy Buy
- Boxer Superstores

== Tanzania ==
- Sifamart Supermarkets
- Shoppers Supermarkets
- Shrijees Supermarkets
- TSN Supermarket
- Village Supermarkets
- SPAR
- Mr Price
- Woolworths
- SafeWay Food Stores, Mikocheni/Mbweni

== Togo ==
- Le Champion

== Tunisia ==
- Cady Supermarchés
- Carrefour
- Carrefour Market
- Magasin Aziza
- Monoprix (Monoprix)
- MG
- Anouar Market

== Uganda ==
- Capital Shoppers
- Carrefour
- Checkers Supermarkets
- Cynabel Supermarkets
- Kenjoy Supermarkets
- Mega Standard Supermarkets
- Quality Supermarkets
- Super Supermarket
- Woolworths

== Zambia ==
- Pick 'n Pay
- Shoprite
- SPAR
- Choppies
- Food Lovers Market
- Mass Stores
- Melisa Supermarkets
- Cheers
- 24seven
- Jumbo
- Home Essential
- Zambeef
- Zmart

== Zimbabwe ==
- Choppies
- OK
- Pick 'n Pay
- SPAR
- TM
- Mfs
- ING-CO
- Greens
- Food Lovers Market
- Fortwell
