= Botswana Stock Exchange =

Stock exchange located in Gaborone, Botswana

- Type: Stock exchange
- Location: Gaborone, Botswana
- Founded: 1995
- Key people: Mr Thapelo Tsheole CEO; Ms Tidimalo Poonyane Corporate Affairs; Tsametse Mmolai Listings and Trade; Mpho Mogasha Finance and Administration
- Currency: P
- No. of listings: 53
- Market cap: P 412.30 billion (2018)
- Indices: BSE-DCI; BSE-FCI
- Website: bse.co.bw

The Botswana Stock Exchange (BSE) is a stock exchange located in Gaborone, Botswana. The Botswana share market was established in 1989 and became the Botswana Stock Exchange in 1994. It is governed by the Botswana Stock Exchange Act.

The BSE has 36 market listings and three stock indices: the Domestic company index (BSE DCI); the Foreign company index (BSE FCI), incorporating companies which are dual listed on the BSE and another stock exchange; and the All Company Index, which is a weighted average of the DCI and FCI. As well as equities, bonds and Floating Rate Notes are traded. Private investors are estimated to account for under 10% of the total market capitalisation. Foreign-based mining companies make up over 90%.

The exchange's normal trading sessions are from 10:00 to 14:00 on all days of the week except Saturdays, Sundays and holidays declared by the Exchange in advance.

The licensing authority for brokers in Botswana is the Ministry of Finance. Membership may be corporate or individual.

== List of companies ==
- Absa Bank Botswana
- Access Bank Botswana
- Botswana Insurance Holdings Limited
- Botswana Telecommunications Corp Ltd
- Chobe Holdings Ltd
- Choppies Enterprises Ltd
- Cresta Marakanelo Limited
- Engen Botswana Limited
- Far Property Company Ltd
- First National Bank of Botswana
- Funeral Services Group Ltd
- Furnmart Ltd
- G4S Botswana Ltd
- Imara Holdings Limited
- Letshego
- PrimeTime Property Holding Limited
- RDC Properties Limited
- Sechaba Brewery Holdings Limited
- Sefalana Holding Company Limited
- Shumba Energy Ltd
- Standard Chartered Bank Botswana Limited
- Turnstar Holdings Limited

== See also ==
- List of African stock exchanges
- List of stock exchanges in the Commonwealth of Nations
- Economy of Botswana
