= List of supermarket chains in Kenya =

This is the list of supermarket chains in Kenya.

== Foreign-based supermarket chains ==
- Carrefour
- Village Supermarket
- Migros

== Locally based supermarket chains ==
- Chandarana Supermarkets
- Eastmatt Supermarkets
- Shivling supermarkets
- Cleanshelf supermarket
- Woolmatt supermarkets
- Jumaa supermarkets
- Maathai Supermarkets
- Magunas Supermarkets
- Quick Mart Limited
- Naivas Limited

== See also ==
- List of supermarket chains in Africa
- List of supermarket chains
