= Botswana pula =

Currency of Botswana

Obverse of 2 pula (1980s)
Reverse of 2 pula (1980s)

ISO 4217
- Code: BWP (numeric: 072)
- Subunit: 0.01

Unit
- Unit: pula
- Symbol: P

Denominations
- Subunit
- 1/100: thebe
- Banknotes: 10, 20, 50, 100, 200 pula
- Coins: 5, 10, 25, 50 thebe, 1, 2, 5 pula

Demographics
- Date of introduction: 23 August 1976
- Official user(s): Botswana
- Unofficial user: Zimbabwe

Issuance
- Central bank: Bank of Botswana
- Website: www.bankofbotswana.bw

Valuation
- Inflation: 2.50% (April 2020)
- Source: Bank of Botswana, 7 July 2016
- Method: CPI

The pula is the currency of Botswana. It has the ISO 4217 code BWP and is subdivided into 100 thebe. Pula literally means "rain" in Setswana, because rain is very scarce in Botswana—home to much of the Kalahari Desert— playing a major role in rites of traditional Tswana belief; therefore valuable and the word extends its meaning as "blessing" or "fortune". The word also serves as the national motto of the country.

A sub-unit of the currency is known as thebe, or "shield", and represents defence. The names were picked with the help of the public.

== History ==
The pula was introduced on 23 August 1976, subsequently known as "Pula Day", replacing the rand at par. One hundred days after the pula was introduced, the rand ceased to be legal tender in Botswana.

At its introduction, the pula was pegged to the US dollar. In January 1979, the pula was changed to a floating, unpegged currency. Since June 1980, it has been pegged to a basket of currencies that reflects the country's trading patterns, comprising the South African rand and the International Monetary Fund's special drawing rights.

== Coins ==
In 1976, coins were introduced in denominations of 1, 5, 10, 25 and 50 thebe. The 1 thebe was struck in aluminium, with the 5 thebe in bronze and the others in cupro-nickel. These coins were round except for the scalloped 1 pula. Bronze, dodecagonal 2 thebe coins were introduced in 1981 and discontinued after 1985. In 1991, bronze-plated steel replaced bronze in the 5 thebe, nickel-plated steel replaced cupro-nickel in the 10, 25 and 50 thebe and the 1 pula changed to a smaller, nickel-brass, equilateral-curve heptagonal coin. A similarly shaped, nickel-brass 2 pula was introduced in 1994. In 2004, the composition was changed to brass-plated steel and the size was slightly reduced.

Following the withdrawal of the 1 and 2 thebe in 1991 and 1998 respectively, smaller 5, 10, 25 and 50 thebe coins were introduced, with the 5 and 25 thebe coins being seven-sided and the 10 and 50 thebe coins remaining round. A bimetallic 5 pula depicting a mopane caterpillar and a branch of the mopane tree it feeds on was introduced in 2000 composed of a cupronickel centre in a ring made of aluminium-nickel-bronze.

A new series of coins was introduced in 2013. All previous coins were demonetized with effect from 28 August 2014, and remained exchangeable to current coins for 5 years until 28 August 2019.

The word "Ipelegeng" is found on the coins, which literally means "to carry your own weight" or "to be self-sufficient or independent" but in general has various different meanings in the Tswana language.

Botswana pula coins
Image	Value	Composition	Diameter	Mass	Thickness	Edge	Issued	Demonetized
	1 thebe	Aluminium	18.5 mm	0.8 g	1.22 mm	Smooth	1976–1991	1 July 2014
	2 thebe	Bronze	17.4 mm (dodecagonal)	1.8 g	1.05 mm	Smooth	1981–1985	1 July 2014
	5 thebe	Bronze	19.5 mm	2.8 g	1.17 mm	Reeded	1976–1989	1 July 2014
	5 thebe	Bronze-plated steel	19.5 mm	2.8 g	1.28 mm	Smooth or reeded	1991–1996	1 July 2014
	5 thebe	Bronze-plated steel	17 mm (heptagonal)	2.41 g	1.75 mm	Smooth	1998–2009	1 July 2014
	5 thebe	Nickel-plated steel	18 mm (heptagonal)	2.218 g	1.3 mm	Smooth	2013	current
	10 thebe	Copper-nickel	22 mm	4 g	1.33 mm	Reeded	1976–1989	1 July 2014
	10 thebe	Nickel-plated steel	22 mm	3.8 g		Reeded	1991	1 July 2014
	10 thebe	Nickel-plated steel	18 mm	2.8 g	1.75 mm	Reeded	1998–2008	1 July 2014
	10 thebe	Nickel-plated steel	20 mm	2.8 g	1.4 mm	Reeded	2013	current
	25 thebe	Copper-nickel	25 mm	5.8 g		Reeded	1976–1989	1 July 2014
	25 thebe	Nickel-plated steel	25 mm	5.73 g		Reeded	1991	1 July 2014
	25 thebe	Nickel-plated steel	20 mm (heptagonal)	3.5 g	1.8 mm	Smooth	1998–2009	1 July 2014
	25 thebe	Nickel-plated steel	22 mm (heptagonal)	4.2 g	1.6 mm	Smooth	2013	current
	50 thebe	Copper-nickel	28 mm	11.4 g	2.3 mm	Reeded	1976–1985	1 July 2014
	50 thebe	Nickel-plated steel	28 mm	11.4 g			1991	1 July 2014
	50 thebe	Nickel-plated steel	21.3 mm	4.82 g	2.2 mm	Smooth	1996–2001	1 July 2014
	50 thebe	Nickel-plated steel	24 mm	5.3 g	1.8 mm	Reeded	2013	current
	1 pula	Copper-nickel	29.5 mm; scalloped (with 12 notches)	16.4 g		Smooth	1976–1987	1 July 2014
	1 pula	Nickel-brass	24 mm (heptagonal)	8.8 g	2.7 mm	Segmented (10 reeds per 7 sections)	1991–2007	1 July 2014
	1 pula	Bronze-plated steel	26 mm	7.8 g		Smooth	2013–2016	current
	2 pula	Nickel-brass	26.4 mm (heptagonal)	6.3 g	2.4 mm	Segmented (19 reeds per 7 sections)	1994	1 July 2014
	2 pula	Brass-plated steel	24.6 mm (heptagonal)	6.02 g	2 mm	Segmented (19 reeds per 7 sections)	2004	1 July 2014
	2 pula	Bi-metallic; bronze-plated steel in center, nickel-plated steel in ring	27 mm	7.3 g	2 mm	Reeded	2013–2016	current
	5 pula	Bi-metallic; copper-nickel in center, brass in ring	23.5 mm	6 g	2 mm	Reeded	2000–2007	1 July 2014
	5 pula	Bi-metallic; copper-nickel in center, brass in ring	28 mm	8.7 g	2.2 mm	Segmented	2013–2016	current

== Banknotes ==
On 23 August 1976, the Bank of Botswana introduced notes in denominations of 1, 2, 5, and 10 pula; a 20 pula note followed on 16 February 1978. The 1 and 2 pula notes were replaced by coins in 1991 and 1994, whilst the first 50 and 100 pula notes were introduced on 29 May 1990 and 23 August 1993, respectively. The 5 pula note was replaced by a coin in 2000. The original 1, 2 and 5 pula banknotes were demonetized on 1 July 2011.

The current series of notes was introduced on 23 August 2009 and contains, for the first time, a 200 pula banknote.

In response to the concern of the poor quality of the paper of the 10 pula banknote, the Bank of Botswana unveiled a 10 pula banknote in polymer in November 2017 which was issued to the public on 1 February 2018.

In 2020, the Bank of Botswana issued a new 10 pula polymer banknote that features an image of the former President of Botswana, Mokgweetsi Masisi.

Current series (2009)
Image	Value	Dimensions (mm)	Substrate	Main colour	Description		Issued from
Image	Value	Dimensions (mm)	Substrate	Main colour	Obverse	Reverse	Issued from
	P 10	132 × 66	Paper	Green	Ian Khama	National Assembly building	23 August 2009
	P 10	132 × 66	Polymer	Green	Ian Khama	National Assembly building	1 February 2018
	P 10	132 × 66	Polymer	Green	Mokgweetsi Masisi	National Assembly building	22 February 2021
	P 20	138 × 69	Paper	Red	Kgalemang Tumediso Motsete	Orapa diamond mine	23 August 2009
	P 50	144 × 72	Paper	Brown	Sir Seretse Khama	Okavango delta	23 August 2009
	P 100	150 × 75	Paper	Blue	Sebele I; Bathoen I; Khama III	Diamond mine and sorting	23 August 2009
	P 200	156 × 78	Paper	Violet	Woman teaching pupils	Zebras	23 August 2009
For table standards, see the banknote specification table.

Current BWP exchange rates
From Google Finance:	AUD CAD CHF CNY EUR GBP HKD JPY USD ZAR
From Yahoo! Finance:	AUD CAD CHF CNY EUR GBP HKD JPY USD ZAR
From XE.com:	AUD CAD CHF CNY EUR GBP HKD JPY USD ZAR
From OANDA:	AUD CAD CHF CNY EUR GBP HKD JPY USD ZAR

== Use in Zimbabwe ==
Due to hyperinflation in Zimbabwe from 2006 to 2008, the government of Zimbabwe has allowed circulation of foreign currency since 2008. The Zimbabwean dollar became obsolete on 12 April 2009. Several currencies, including the South African rand and Botswana pula, circulate in Zimbabwe, along with the Zimbabwean bond notes and bond coins.

== Lesotho ==
The word pula also serves as part of the national motto of the Kingdom of Lesotho. As in Botswana, it means "rain" in the Sotho language and is considered a synonym for "blessing".

== See also ==
- Economy of Botswana

Preceded by: South African rand Reason: creation of independent currency Ratio: at par	Currency of Botswana; 1976 –	Succeeded by: Current
