= Naivas Limited =

Supermarket chain in Kenya

Coordinates: 01°19′36″S 36°52′04″E

Naivas Supermarket Limited
- Type: Private, majority family owned
- Industry: Retail
- Founded: 27 July 1990; 35 years ago
- Headquarters: Sameer Industrial Park; Nairobi, Kenya,
- Number of locations: 90 (December 10 2022)
- Key people: Simon Gashwe Mukuha (chairman); David Kimani Mukuha (managing director); Willy Kimani (chief commercial officer); Peter Mukuha (chief operations officer)
- Products: Food and non-food grocery
- Operating income: Gross sales: US$860 million (2022)
- Number of employees: 8,000+ (June 2022)
- Website: Official website

Naivas Supermarket, often referred to simply as Naivas, is the largest supermarket chain in Kenya, with 106 outlets as of November 2024. At that time, it was the largest supermarket chain in Kenya, ahead of Quick Mart Limited, which had 51 outlets in the country.

== Location ==
The company headquarters, as well as the company's warehouses, are located in Sameer Business Park, in the Industrial Area of Nairobi, the capital and largest city of Kenya. The coordinates of the headquarters of Naivas Limited are: 01°19'36.0"S, 36°52'04.0"E (Latitude:-1.326667; Longitude:36.867779).

== Overview ==
Naivas is headquartered in Nairobi, with retail outlets in many urban centres in the country.

In July 2018, the company hired Andreas von Paleske, as an advisor to assist the business with its strategy and operations. This culminated in bringing African private equity firm Amethis on board for a minority stake. At that time, Naivas Limited maintained 47 stores in Kenya. The supermarket chain opened its 53rd store in Kenya in July 2019 at Rongai, Nakuru County, with plans to open two more in the same year.

== History ==
Naivas Limited was registered on 24 July 1990. It previously traded as Rongai Self Service Stores Limited, serving mainly in Rongai in Nakuru County. The company name was changed later to Naivasha Self Service Stores Limited, before re-branding to the current Naivas Limited, in 2007.

In August 2013, the Johannesburg Stock Exchange-listed Massmart, a subsidiary of retail giant Walmart, offered to acquire a 51 per cent stake in Naivas at a cost of KSh3 billion, giving Massmart a controlling interest in the retail chain. The bid triggered a feud at family-owned Naivas, and some family members asked a court to block the sale. In October 2013, Naivas management stated that they were no longer selling a controlling stake to Massmart.

On 16 July 2014, Naivas opened a store in Garissa, making it the first major retailer to open an outlet in the town. This was Naivas' 31st branch in Kenya.

== Ownership ==
Naivas Limited is a privately owned company, whose shares are majorly held by the descendants of its founder Peter Mukuha Kago, who died on 6 May 2010.

=== November 2014 ===
The table below depicts the shareholding as of November 2014:

Naivas Limited stock ownership as of November 2014
Rank	Name of owner	Percentage ownership
1	David Kimani	25.0
2	Simon Gachwe	25.0
3	Linet Wairimu	15.0
4	Grace Wambui	15.0
5	Estate of Peter Mukuha Kago	20.0
	Total	100.00

=== April 2020 ===
In February 2020, the Competition Authority of Kenya (CAK) approved the acquisition of 30 percent of Naivas shareholding by the French equity firm Amethis Finance for an undisclosed sum. In April 2020, Business Daily Africa reported that the International Finance Corporation had acquired a minority stake in the company for US$15 million (approx. KSh2.1 billion). As of that date the new shareholding in Naivas Limited is as illustrated in the table below:

Naivas Limited stock ownership as of April 2020
Rank	Name of owner	Percentage ownership	Notes
1	Mukuha family	70.0	
2	Amethis Finance, IFC and Others	30.0	
	Total	100.00	

=== June 2022 ===
In June 2022, a consortium led by Mauritian investment conglomerate IBL Group bought out the IFC-led consortium at an undisclosed price. When that deal closes, the shareholding in Naivas Limited will look as depicted in the table below.

Naivas Limited stock ownership as of June 2022
Rank	Name of owner	Percentage ownership	Notes
1	Mukuha family	60.0	
2	IBL Group, Proparco & DEG	40.0	
	Total	100.00	

== Branches ==
As of December 2017, the supermarket chain maintained 43 branches across Kenya, with the Nairobi south c branch being the latest. By February 2018, that number had risen to 45, with the latest addition being the Capital Centre Mall Branch, along Mombasa Road in Nairobi. In February 2020, the chain opened its 64th store as the anchor tenant in the mega city mall, in Kisumu. By June 2022, the retail chain had grown to 84 outlets in Kenya.

== See also ==
- Economy of Kenya
- East African Community
- Supermarket chains in Kenya
- Supermarket chains in Africa
