= Colleen Zamba =

Malawian politician

Colleen Pempho Zamba

Secretary to the President and Cabinet of Malawi
- In office 1 June 2022 – 5 October 2025
- President: Lazarus Chakwera
- Preceded by: Zanga-zanga Chikhosi
- Succeeded by: Justin Sadack Saidi

Personal details
- Born: 24 April 1963 (age 63) Dowa, Malawi
- Party: Malawi Congress Party

Colleen Pempho Zamba is a Malawian politician and civil servant who served as the Secretary to the President and Cabinet (SPC) of the Republic of Malawi between 2022 and 2025. She was a central figure in the purchase of the Amaryllis Hotel by the Public Service Pension Trust Fund. She failed to appear before a Special Public Inquiry surrounding the circumstances of the questionable sale.

== Early life and education ==
Zamba was born in Dowa, Malawi, the eldest of six children of Skeffa Thom Zamba and Felestia Zamba, both educators. Her father was a Malawi Congress Party Member of Parliament for Dowa South East. Her sister is Hope Tionge Zamba, who won the same seat in the 2025 general election.

She attended Lilongwe Girls Secondary School and later earned a Bachelor of Social Science in Economics from Chancellor College, University of Malawi, in 1985. Zamba studied at the University of Glasgow, Scotland, obtaining a Postgraduate Diploma in Development Policy in 1988 and a Master of Philosophy in Economic Planning in 1989, where she was named best student of the year.

== Career ==
Zamba began her career as an economist and became Principal Secretary for Economic Affairs, where she led the monitoring of the Economic Program of Malawi. She then became the Principal Secretary of Debt and Aid Management where she led the negotiation of Heavily Indebted Countries Malawi Decision Point. She also became Principal Secretary for Trade, where she was spokesperson for Southern Africa in trade negotiations.

In October 2021, President Lazarus Chakwera appointed Zamba head of the Presidential Delivery Unit and Chief Advisor to the President on Sustainable Development Goals (SDGs) and International Affairs. On June 1, 2022, Zamba was appointed Secretary to the President and Cabinet, succeeding Zangazanga Chikhosi. Her appointment was lauded by gender activist Emma Kaliya as a demonstration of President Chakwera's commitment to gender equality.

In December 2025, Zamba was arrested at Kamuzu International Airport in Lilongwe while preparing to travel to Switzerland. She was taken into custody by police officers from National Police Headquarters and moved to Lingadzi Police Station for questioning. Authorities did not immediately disclose the reason for the arrest.

Parliament's Public Accounts Committee which also includes Susan Dossi, Amina Kajiya and Ireen Mambala conducted a Special Public Inquiry into the Purchase of the Amaryllis Hotel by the Public Service Pension Trust Fund. Zamba was a central figure in this purchase but she failed to appear. The PAC's report was published in March 2026 and it found numerous failings and that the sale broke the "fundamental principles that govern the management of [a] public pension asset". Zamba continued to not appear before the committee even though the chair said that her appearance was essential. Eventually the PAC were told to report despite Zamba not being available. In August 2026, Parliament adjoined and no report had been reviewed.

Awards and achievements
| Preceded by | Secretary to the President and Cabinet of Malawi | Succeeded by |
