= Hope Tionge Zamba =

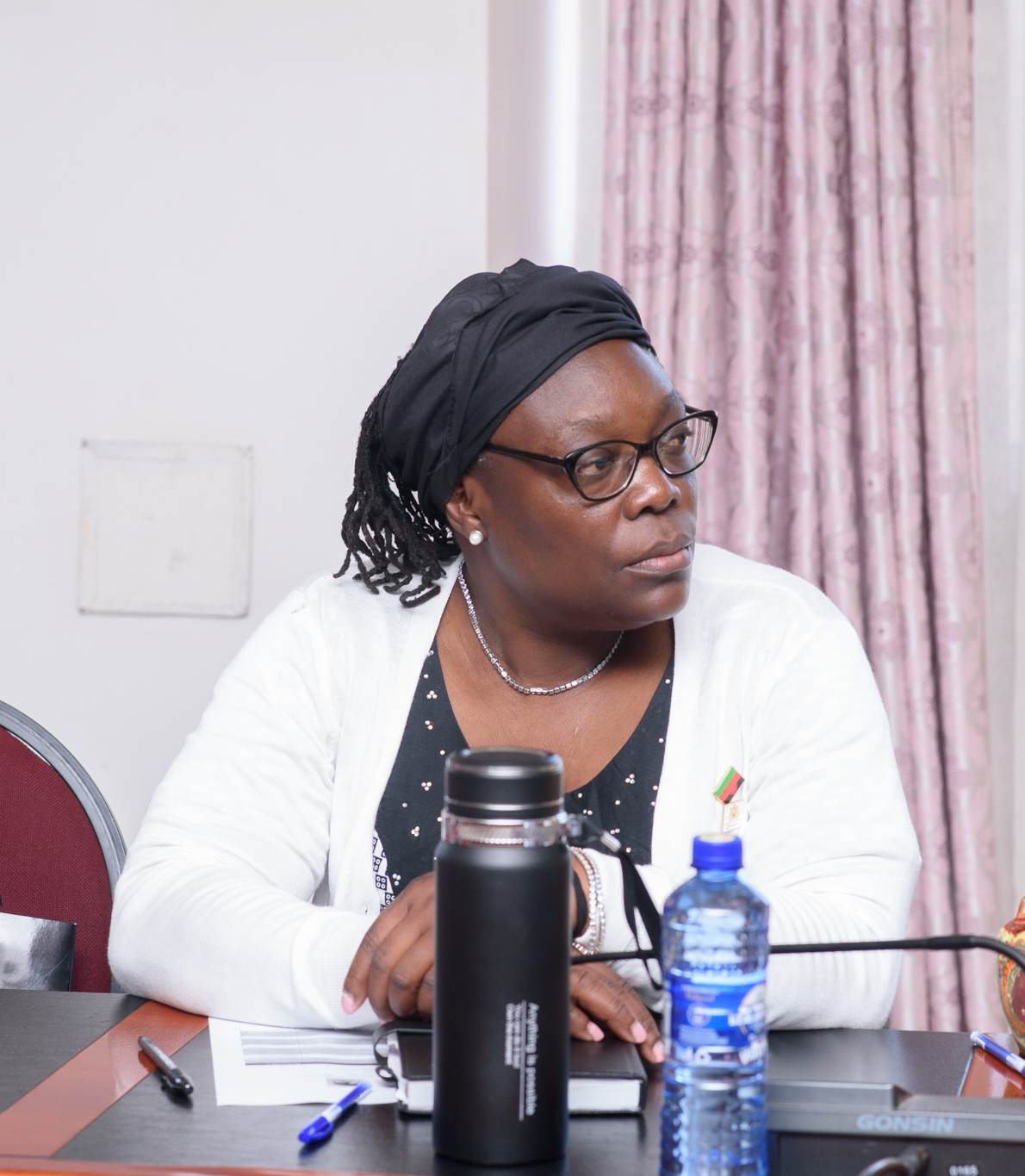
- in 2026
- Occupation: politician
- Known for: MP from 2025 for Dowa South East
- Predecessor: Halima Daud
- Political party: independent

Hope Tionge Zamba is a Malawian politician who defied her defeat in the primaries to become the independent MP for Dowa South East in the 2025 election.

== Life ==
Zamba is one of six children born to Skeffa Thom Zamba and Felestia Zamba, both educators. Her father was a Malawi Congress Party Member of Parliament for Dowa South East. Her sister is Colleen Zamba.

In 2018 she was one of the contestants in controversial primaries in the Dowa South East constituency. The others were the sitting MCP MP, Njoka Chimpeni, Harry Chikumbanje, former Minister of Energy Halima Daudi and Gibson Kawiri. The local chiefs had appealed for help to the MCP party because there was a large difference of opinion regarding the size of the constituency.

In 2025 she was elected as an independent politician for the Dowa South East constituency. She had contested the seat in the primaries and been beaten by the Deputy Minister of Gender, Children and Social Welfare Halima Daud. Daud received 1 000 votes beating Zamba’s 785 votes. In the 2025 general election, she stood against Daud in the Dowa South East constituency as an independent candidate. She attracted over 26,000 votes. The other independents in the Dowa District included Annie Namani Chibwana for Dowa Central and Aida Chitsosa Mchenga for Dowa West.
