= Aisha Adams =

Malawian politician

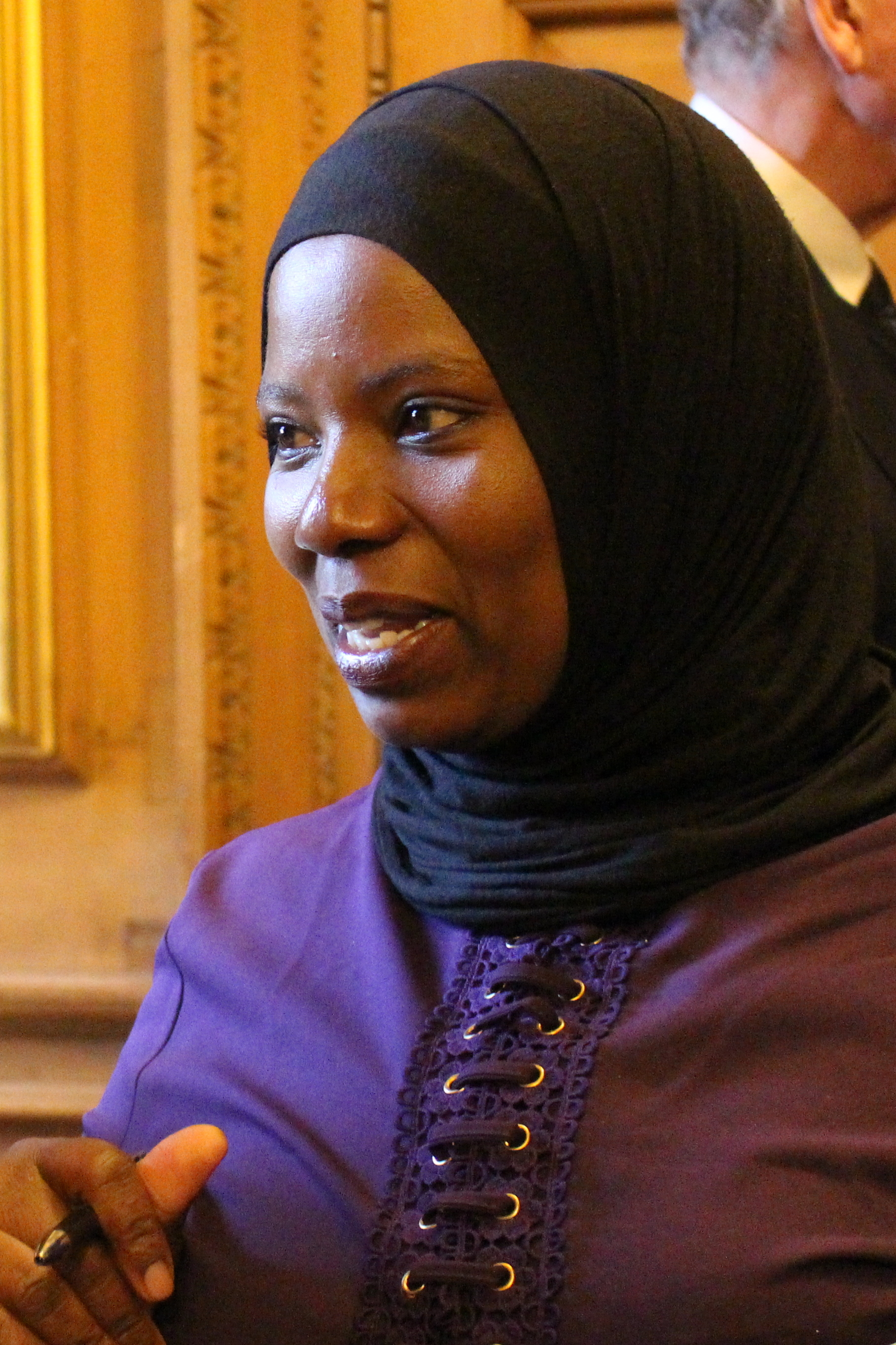
- Aisha Mambo-Adams
- Born: Aisha Annie Mambo
- Occupation: politician
- Known for: second deputy speaker
- Political party: United Democratic Front party.
- Website: details

Aisha Annie Mambo-Adams is a Malawian politician who in 2014 was elected to represent the Mangothi Nkungulu constituency. She was the only elected Muslim and she was a member of the United Democratic Front party. She was re-elected in 2025.

== Life ==
Adams was born in about 1974 and she was raised in Chimwala in Mangochi. After secondary education she became a teacher for six years.

She was known as Achakongwe when she was a presenter on Radio Islam. Her popularity made it possible to stand for parliament in a constituency that is 95% Muslim. She encourages Muslim women to cover their heads and to not just do so on Muslim occasions.

Adams became a member of the United Democratic Front party. In 2014 she brought the election process in the Mangothi Nkungulu constituency, where she was a candidate, to a standstill using a court injunction. She argued that the list of candidates had been interfered with and she asked the court to postpone the primary elections and to prevent certain people from being involved with the list of candidates. She refused to discuss her grievance with the press, but she noted that she was a loyal supporter of Atupele Muluzi and the United Democratic Front party.

She was elected to represent the Mangothi Nkungulu constituency and she was one of the first women Muslims in parliament. In May 2019 she became the second deputy speaker in parliament. She and Catherine Gotani Hara were congratulated by the Malawi Human Rights Commission for being women appointed to such important positions. She was the first Muslim to be a deputy speaker but other Muslim women parliamentarians include Abida Mia, Mwalone Jangiya, Halima Daud and Esther Majaza.

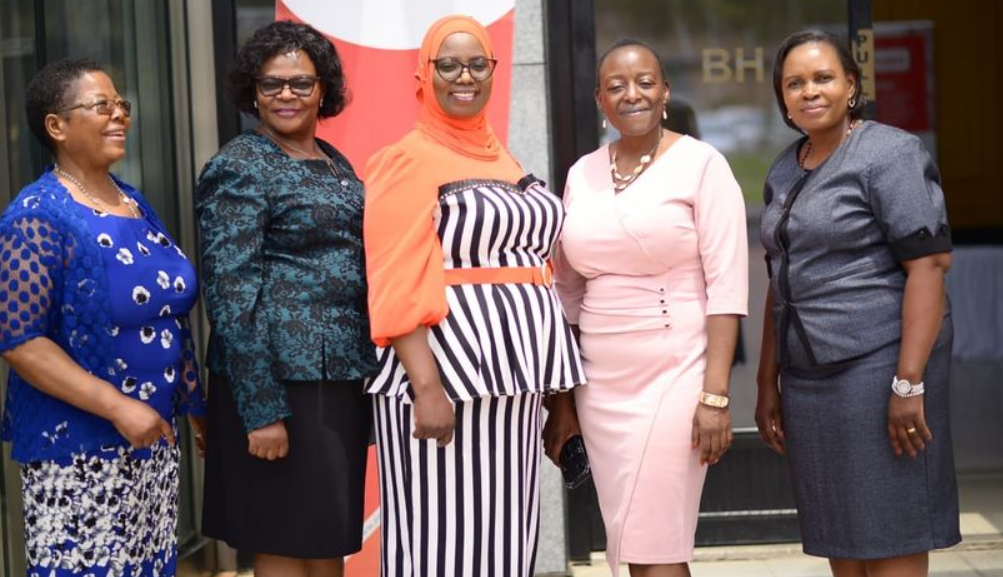
International Day of the Girl Child in 2024: Mary Shaba from Plan International, Christalbel Chakwana of UNICEF, Aisha Adams, Linda Dembo of the MaSP and Janet Chidothi

Adams visited Scotland at the end of January 2024 when she and deputy speaker Madalitso Kazombo were hosted by a meeting of the Scotland Malawi partnership. She is a keen supporter of higher education because it allows both individuals and the country to progress. She had welcomed the partnerships in education but she has also suggested that the Muslim community in Malawi should consider funding their own institutions of higher learning.

In 2024, she was to be the United Democratic Front party's chair at their convention, but she resigned in September 2024. She was still supportive of the party but she found that internal differences of opinion had become too large.

Adams is a member of the Malawi Parliamentary Women's Caucus which was led by Roseby Gadama in 2024. She was re-elected in 2025 when over half of Malawi's MPs lost their seat.

== Private life ==
She is married to Simon Adams and they have four children.
