= Ireen Navicha =

Malawian beauty pageant titleholder

- Citizenship: Malawian
- Education: Malawi University of Science and Technology
- Relatives: Mary Navicha (mother)
- Beauty pageant titleholder
- Title: Miss Culture Malawi 2023; Miss World Malawi 2026
- Major competitions: Miss Culture Malawi 2023 (Winner); Miss Malawi 2025 (1st Runner-up); Miss World 2026 (Top 40)

Ireen Navicha is a Malawian beauty pageant titleholder. She was first runner-up at Miss Malawi 2025 and represented Malawi at Miss World 2026 in Vietnam, where she placed in the top 40.

== Early life and education ==
Navicha is from Lilongwe. Her mother is the politician Mary Navicha, Malawi's Minister of Gender. She studied Indigenous Knowledge Systems and Practices at the Malawi University of Science and Technology.

== Pageantry ==
Navicha won Miss Culture Malawi in 2023 and finished as first princess at Miss Culture Global in Johannesburg that year. At Miss Malawi 2025, held in Lilongwe in December 2025, she was first runner-up to Thandi Chisi. In 2026 the Miss Malawi Organisation chose Navicha rather than Chisi to represent the country at Miss World. The decision was criticised, with some commentators linking it to her mother's position; the organisers denied any political influence and cited Navicha's experience in international pageants.

At Miss World 2026, held in Vietnam from August to September, she reached the top 24 of the Beauty With a Purpose segment and advanced to the top 40 of the main competition, but did not progress to the top 20. Nyasa Times reported that she was the first Malawian contestant to reach the top 40.

== Advocacy ==
In 2022 Navicha founded the Greynavies Foundation, which supports girls who have left school because of early marriage or pregnancy to return to education.
