= Miss Malawi =

Beauty contest

- Formation: 2001
- Type: Beauty pageant
- Headquarters: Lilongwe
- Location: Malawi
- Members: Miss World
- Official languages: English, Chewa, Tumbuka

Miss Malawi is a national beauty pageant in Malawi. It began in the 1970s in Malawi and was later suspended, commencing again in 2001. The Miss Malawi Title holder for 2025 is Thandi Chisi who was crowned on the 13 December 2025. She succeeded Jescar Mponda who won the title after a controversial pageant in 2022.

== List of Miss Malawi Titlehoders ==
Year	Name	Home city	Miss World	Ref.
2001	Elizabeth Pullu	-	2001	
2002	Blandina Khondowe	Blantyre	withdrew	
2003	Mable Pullu	-		
2004	Florence Zeka	Blantyre	2005	
2005	Rachel Landson Phiri	-		
2006	Name			
2007	Perth Msiska	Mzuzu		
2008	Name			
2009	Joyce Mphande	Mzuzu		
2010	Faith Chibale †	-		
2011	Susan Mtegha †	Mzuzu	2012	
2012	No contest			
2013	No contest			
2014	No contest			
2015	No contest			
2016				
2017	Cecilia Khofi	Blantyre		
2018	Tiwonge Munthali	Mzuzu		
2022	Jescar Mponda	Lilongwe		
2025	Thandi Chisi	Lilongwe		

== Management ==
After reviving in 2001 the pageant continued to crown a Miss Malawi until 2012. It was managed by Carver Bhima's company Events Management. Since 2016, the contest has been managed by Nation Publications and Zodiak Broadcasting Station.

== Controversies ==
At the 2012 Miss World, Susan Mtegha pushed Miss New Zealand, Collette Lochore, during the opening headshot of the pageant, claiming that Miss New Zealand was in her space.

In 2026 it was announced that Thandi Chisi, the reigning Miss Malawi, was not to a contestant in the Miss World competition that year. Instead the organisers announced they were sending Ireen Navicha who was a runner-up and daughter of Malawian politician Mary Navicha. They variously claimed this was due to Chisi being too old, and her lack of experience. They denied it was due to political interference.

== Titleholders represented at Miss World ==
Year	Miss Malawi	Placement
2001	Elizabeth Pullu	
2005	Rachel Landson	
2010	Ella Kabambe	
2012	Susan Mtegha †	
2017	Cecilia Khofi	Did not compete
2018	Tiwonge Munthali	Did not compete
2026	Ireen Navicha	Top 40
