= Mponela =

- Location in Malawi
- Coordinates: 13°31′S 33°43′E
- Country: Malawi
- Region: Central Region
- District: Dowa District

Population (2018 Census)
  - Total: 24,543
- Time zone: +2
- Climate: Cwa

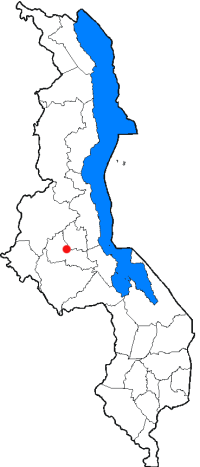
Location

Mponela is a town in Dowa District in the Central Region of Malawi.

Mponela lies at 1,200 m in the Dowa District in the Central Region of Malawi, 60 km north of Lilongwe, with a population of 24,543 (2018 Census). It is on the tarred road between Lilongwe–Mzuzu, is connected with power and phone lines and has an airstrip.

Mponela is primarily an agricultural town without touristic interest. The government maintains a nutrition centre in which 700 children per day obtain food.

== Demographics ==
Year	Population
1998	9,846
2008	14,322
2018	24,543
