= Blandina Khondowe =

Malawian cancer advocate (1980–2020)

- Khondowe in 2018
- Born: Blandina Mlenga; 12 October 1980; Malawi
- Died: 21 November 2020 (aged 40)
- Occupations: Activist, civil servant
- Children: 2

Blandina Khondowe (née Mlenga; 12 October 1980 – 21 November 2020) was a Malawian cancer advocate, civil servant and beauty pageant titleholder who won Miss Malawi in 2002. She worked as a tourism ambassador following her pageant win and later joined Malawi's Ministry of Tourism, where she became a principal tourism officer.

After being diagnosed with breast cancer in 2013, Khondowe campaigned for greater awareness of cancer, earlier diagnosis and improved access to treatment in Malawi. She co-founded Think Pink Malawi and founded the Hope for Cancer Foundation, organised awareness walks and community screening activities, and wrote a newspaper column about cancer. In 2019, she received the Barbara Brenner Breast Cancer Activist Scholarship to attend the San Antonio Breast Cancer Symposium. In 2020 the Ombudsman found that disciplinary charges brought against her over Facebook posts critical of the then government were unjustified and that she had been discriminated against. She died in November 2020, aged 40, from a recurrence of her cancer.

== Early life, education and career ==
Blandina Khondowe was born Blandina Mlenga on 12 October 1980. She grew up in Blantyre and was the third of four children. She studied business at the Polytechnic (now the Malawi University of Business and Applied Sciences), then a constituent college of the University of Malawi, and was in her final year, aged 21, when she won Miss Malawi in 2002. After winning Miss Malawi, she served as a tourism ambassador, a role she described as involving travel within Malawi and abroad to promote the country.

In 2003, she moved to the United Kingdom to study, returning to Malawi in 2007 having earnt undergraduate and postgraduate degrees in business administration. Reflecting in 2014 on her pageant career and subsequent decision to study in Britain, Khondowe said: "I met so many successful people as beauty queen and that made me want to become successful too." She moved to Lilongwe in 2008 to work for the government and was a senior tourism officer in the Ministry of Tourism by 2014. She later became principal tourism officer and remained employed by the ministry until her death.

In June 2016 she joined the judging panel at the first audition, in Mzuzu, for the revived Miss Malawi contest, which had not been held since 2012. Her role involved coaching and motivating contestants. She was also an audition judge for the 2017 contest.

== Cancer advocacy ==
=== Think Pink Malawi ===
Khondowe was diagnosed with breast cancer on 7 October 2013, shortly before her 33rd birthday. In a 2014 interview, she described delays in diagnosing a breast lump and said that she had undergone surgery, chemotherapy and radiotherapy, receiving treatment in India before continuing chemotherapy in Malawi. She said that her experience had drawn her attention to shortcomings in cancer diagnosis and treatment in Malawi, particularly the difficulties faced by women who were unable to afford private care or treatment abroad.

Khondowe co-founded Think Pink Malawi with a group of friends. Eleanor Nkosi was a co-founder, and Magdalena Zgambo worked with her on its first walk in 2014. Khondowe dated its founding to 2013, while Nkosi and news reports date it to 2014. The organisation aimed to promote breast cancer awareness and early detection. The campaign sought support from government and businesses for improved cancer treatment and care, and public education. Its partners included UN Women, Press Trust, Airtel Malawi, Standard Bank Malawi and Nation Publications.

The October 2015 walk in Lilongwe drew hundreds of participants and included accounts presented by cancer survivors. Khondowe also wrote about her experience on a blog, My Breast Cancer Journey, and discussed cancer awareness in her Malawi News column, "Fencing Cancer". Her advocacy emphasised the needs of rural women, who had limited access to information and treatment. In May 2016, Think Pink Malawi donated chemotherapy drugs worth K500,000 to Kamuzu Central Hospital, purchased with proceeds from a fashion show organised by student Kudakwashe Munyikwa and contributions from other donors. In September 2017, Khondowe reported that Think Pink Malawi had reached more than 5,000 people with cancer awareness messages since 2014 and had arranged physical examinations for 2,000 women. She said that 50 women had been referred to Kamuzu Central Hospital for further testing, of whom eight had received treatment for breast cancer and twelve for cervical cancer.

Khondowe was a coauthor of "Breast Cancer Screening in Low- and Middle-Income Countries: A Perspective From Malawi", published in the Journal of Global Oncology in 2016.

=== Hope for Cancer Foundation ===
Khondowe founded the Hope for Cancer Foundation, which was incorporated as a trust in October 2015 and registered as a nongovernmental organisation in October 2017. She served as its chief executive officer and sought to expand cancer awareness, screening and support through community outreach.

In February 2018, at a Step Up for Cancer aerobics event at Umodzi Park in Lilongwe, Khondowe said that her re-diagnosis of cancer in 2017 and a second course of treatment abroad had led her to expand her work through the Foundation and a planned wellness centre offering cancer care alongside nutrition and fitness support. The mobile operator Telekom Networks Malawi donated K1 million towards the centre, and the German ambassador praised the initiative. In May 2018, she said that financial constraints had delayed the Foundation's activities and that she hoped to establish a cancer wellness centre. The foundation appointed footballer Gabadinho Mhango as a brand ambassador in June 2018.

In August 2018 the foundation trained women's guild members from four Church of Central Africa Presbyterian congregations in Lilongwe to detect breast and cervical cancer; a nurse working with the foundation said it had by then reached about 6,000 women, more than 25 of whom had been diagnosed with cancer. In March 2019 the Blantyre-based Silver Grey Club and National Bank donated K1 million raised through a "no shave November" fundraising drive. Khondowe said the foundation prioritised awareness, particularly of cervical cancer, and was targeting rural women's groups such as village savings groups.

Between May and September 2019 the foundation ran campaigns in Lilongwe and Mchinji that reached about 1,000 women. Free screening found 19 women with pre-cancerous lesions and two with advanced cervical cancer, who were referred to Kamuzu Central Hospital; six others were treated on site by thermocoagulation. The Nation reported after Khondowe's death that her two initiatives had directly reached more than 10,000 people with awareness and screening.

== Dispute with the Ministry of Tourism ==
Khondowe supported the opposition United Transformation Movement (UTM). In December 2019, the Ministry of Tourism's principal secretary served Khondowe with a notice of disciplinary charges alleging that her Facebook posts critical of the governing Democratic Progressive Party amounted to subversive activity and to political activity improper for a civil servant. She replied that the notice breached the 21-day response period in the Public Service Act and her constitutional freedoms of conscience, opinion and expression. The Maravi Post reported in March 2020 that she had been called to a disciplinary hearing for supporting the opposition United Transformation Movement on social media, and quoted the principal secretary as confirming that he had written the letter. The Ministry later said she had not been interdicted and had continued working on full pay. In July 2020 it withdrew the charges after the Attorney General advised that they had been irregularly drawn up.

Khondowe complained to the Ombudsman, Martha Chizuma, in April 2020. In a determination dated 23 October 2020, Chizuma found that the process had been initiated by the Office of the President and Cabinet, which she held had no power to direct an interdiction, and that the charges were unjustified and the procedure irregular. She also found that Khondowe had been discriminated against, and described each of these failings as maladministration. Chizuma directed the principal secretary to write an apology to Khondowe by 15 November 2020. She rejected Khondowe's separate claim that she had been unfairly removed from a secondment to Umodzi Holdings, but found she should have been given a month's notice.

== Death and legacy ==
In 2019, Khondowe received the Barbara Brenner Breast Cancer Activist Scholarship to attend the San Antonio Breast Cancer Symposium in Texas.

She died of a recurrence of her cancer on 21 November 2020, aged 40. She had collapsed at home and was taken to Spring Valley Private Hospital in Lilongwe, where she was pronounced dead. She was married and had two children. Vice-President Saulos Chilima called her "a consummate patriot, a fearless and courageous fighter"; he and President Lazarus Chakwera both attended her funeral.

A 2026 study of cancer coverage in the online news sources Nyasa Times and Maravi Post between 2015 and 2023 found that Think Pink Malawi was the nongovernmental actor most often portrayed as committing resources to address cancer, being mentioned in 11 of the 71 relevant articles.

== Publications ==
- "Breast Cancer Screening in Low- and Middle-Income Countries: A Perspective From Malawi", Journal of Global Oncology, Lily A. Gutnik, Beatrice Matanje-Mwagomba, Vanessa Msosa, Suzgo Mzumara, Blandina Khondowe, Agnes Moses, Racquel E. Kohler, Lisa A. Carey, Clara N. Lee and Satish Gopal.

Awards and achievements
Preceded by Elizabeth Pullu	Miss Malawi; 2002	Succeeded by Mable Pulu
