= Thandi Chisi =

Malawian model and beauty pageant

- Born: 13 February 1999 (age 27); Lilongwe, Malawi
- Occupations: Social Activist, Model
- Height: 1.71 m (5 ft 7 1/2 in)
- Beauty pageant titleholder
- Title: Miss Malawi 2025
- Major competition: Miss Malawi 2025 (Winner)
- Website: www.thandichisi.com

Thandi Chisi is a Malawian social activist and the current Miss Malawi following her crowning on 13 December 2025. She succeeded Jescar Mponda who was crowned Miss Malawi in the year 2022. She was passed over by the organisers who sent the second place holder to Miss World.

== Education ==
Thandi was born in the year 1999, on February 13. Thandi studied at Likuni Girls Secondary School, and from there she went to study for her bachelor's degree in social science at the University of Malawi, Chancellor College.

== Career ==
Apart from her role as Miss Malawi, Thandi is an executive director for her organization called the Sustainable Fashion and Women Empowerment Initiative. She founded the organization in the year 2022. Thandi was recognized as being among Wealth Magazine’s 100 Influential Women 2026.

In 2026 it was announced that Chisi was not going to be a contestant in the Miss World competition that year. Instead, the organisers said, they were going to send Ireen Navicha who was a runner-up. They initially said that Chisi was too old at 27, but that was not the case. The organisers then said it was because Ireen Navicha had international experience. They said it was not because of the political influence of Navicha's mother Mary Navicha. Navicha would wear an identical crown to the one given to Thandi Chisi.
