= Tiwonge Munthali =

Malawian model and beauty pageant titleholder

- Born: 19 October 1998 (age 27); Mzuzu, Malawi
- Occupation: Model
- Height: 1.73 m (5 ft 8 in)
- Beauty pageant titleholder
- Title: Miss Malawi 2018
- Major competitions: Miss Malawi 2018 (Winner); Miss Heritage 2016 (Winner)

Tiwonge Munthali (born 19 October 1998) is a Malawian model and beauty pageant titleholder who was crowned Miss Malawi 2018. She took over Cecilia Khofi, former Miss Malawi 2017. Mwabi Mfune and Ngugi Buleya were first and second runner ups.

== Background ==
=== Early life ===
Munthali was born on 19 October 1998, in Mzuzu, the capital of Malawi's Northern Region and the third largest city by population in Malawi. She graduated from Malawi Assemblies of God University in Lilongwe. She is a Tumbuka by tribe.

== Pageantry ==
=== Miss Malawi 2018 ===
Munthali won the title of Miss Malawi 2018 outshining 14 other contestants in the finals of the beauty pageant at Bingu International Conference centre in Lilongwe on Saturday. Munthali is not new to pageantry. She won Miss Heritage crown in November 2016 in Lilongwe. On Saturday night, 2018, Munthali went away with a Nissan Tiida, a laptop and a state of the art phone, all totaling K7 million (7 million Kwacha). Mwawi Mfune was voted as 1st Princess while Chimwemwe Buleya was voted 2nd Princess.

Awards and achievements
Preceded by Cecilia Khofi	Miss Malawi; 2018	Succeeded by Incumbent
