= Simon Vuwa Kaunda =

Malawian politician

Symon Vuwa Kaunda is a Malawian Politician and the former Minister of Environment Tourism and Wildlife in the Republic of Malawi. He has been the Member of Parliament for Nkhata-Bay Central Constituency,

== Life ==
Kaunda has served the ruling Democratic Progressive Party Government as Minister of Lands, Housing and Urban Development. When Mary Navicha was the guest of honour at the Tonga Cultural Festival in August 2019 in the Nkhata Bay district he was there with the Deputy Minister of Local Government Easter Majaza. He was the Minister of Youth Development and Welfare, Minister of Information and Civic Education, and Deputy Minister of Home Affairs in the Republic of Malawi.

He was a member of the Pan-African Parliament from Malawi and a member of the National Assembly of Malawi as part of the ruling Democratic Progressive Party. Kaunda held various ministerial positions in the former DPP led government.

In 2024 he was the DPP's sitting Member of Parliament for the Nkhata-Bay Central Constituency.
