= Abida Mia =

Malawian politician

Abida Sidik Mia
- Occupation: politician
- Known for: minister

Abida Sidik Mia is a Malawian politician. She was the Member of Parliament for Chikwawa Nkombezi in Chikwawa District and the minister of water and sanitation.

== Political career ==
She was elected to the Parliament of Malawi in the 2019 general election. Other Muslim women parliamentarians include Aisha Adams, Halima Daud, Mwalone Jangiya and Esther Majaza.

Mia was appointed Deputy Minister for Lands in 2020. In 2022, she was made Water and Sanitation Minister.

She was made the second deputy President of the Malawi Congress Party in September 2024.

In December 2024 she was in her Chikwawa Nkombezi constituency encouraging voters to register ready for the 2025 elections. She also gave out spare parts to allow boreholes to be better maintained.

Mia was a member of the Malawi Parliamentary Women's Caucus which was led by Roseby Gadama in 2024.

She lost her seat in the 2025 election while representing the Malawi Congress Party.

== Personal life ==
She is the widow of former minister Sidik Mia and their children are Huraine, Sauda, Akira(Aqrah) and Abdul Wahab.
