= Esmie Kainja =

Esmie Tamanda Kainja
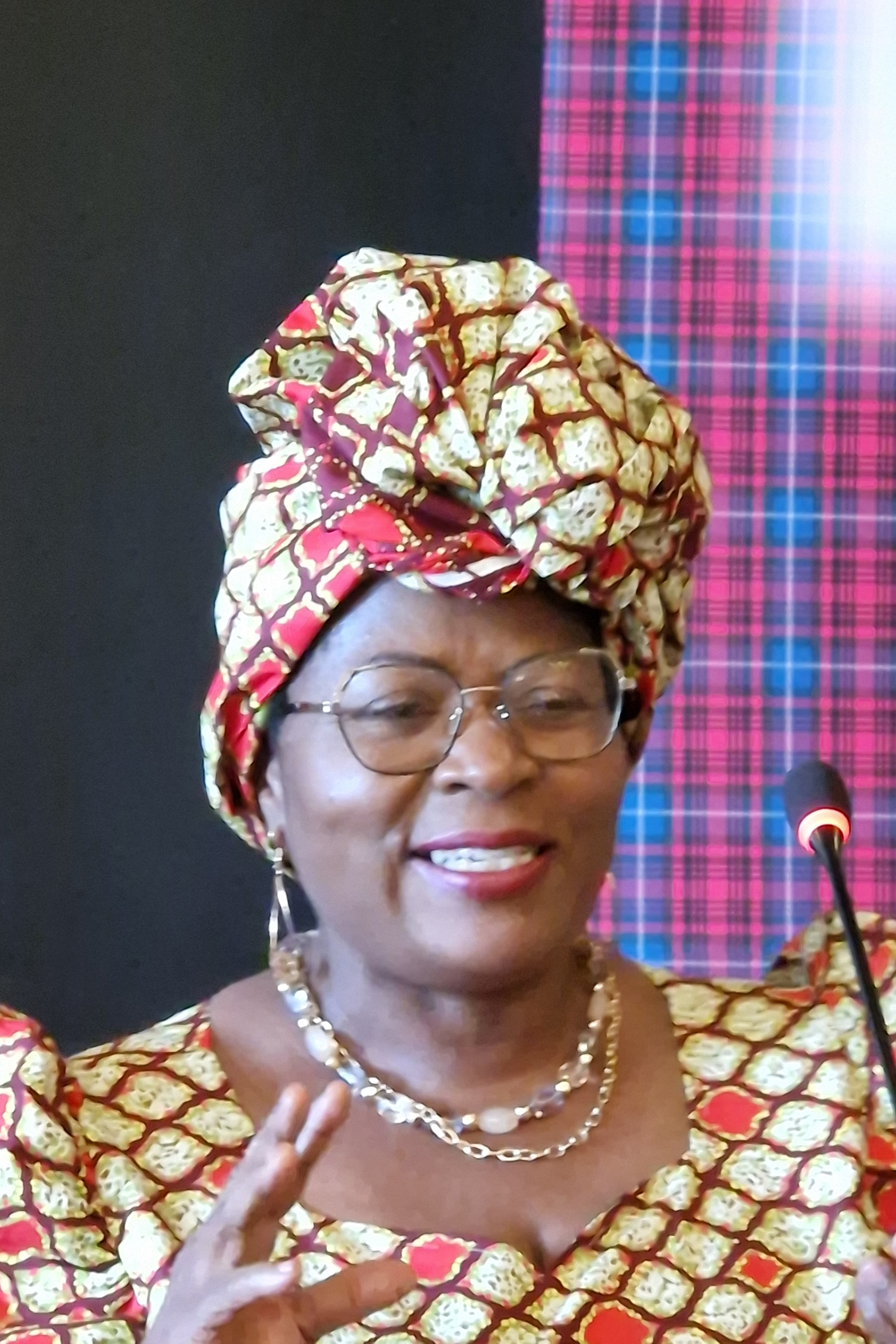
- Education: University of Leeds
- Occupation: Civil servant
- Employer: Government of Malawi
- Known for: Principal Secretary

Esmie Tamanda Kainja is a Malawian civil servant who in 2026 was the Secretary for Gender, Children, Disability and Social Welfare in Malawi.

== Life ==
Kainja studied in the United Kingdom at the University of Leeds. Her 2012 doctoral thesis investigated the support of orphans in Malawi. HIV/AIDS had created a large number of orphans and her study looked at the priorities required to best assist them.

In 2015, Kainja was directing the implementation of a social cash transfer scheme for the Ministry of Gender, Children, Disability and Social Welfare which had been running since 2007. There were over 18,000 beneficiaries. Two years later, she was the Principal Secretary in that ministry.

Kainja was a member of a Special Law Commission that was tasked with introducing a plan to dramatically increase the number of women in parliament. They considered a number of options but decided to recommend that 28 seats should be reserved for women. The idea was eventually rejected by Justice and Constitutional Affairs Minister Samuel Tembenu because it might harm the chances of some women.

She investigated the introduction of cashless transfer of money in Malawi. Kainja was part of a study that looked at the reporting by children of physical and sexual abuse in six countries including Malawi. The results were published openly in 2020.

Kainja became the Principal Secretary in the Ministry of Information and Communications Technology in 2019. She spoke of the need to get girls involved with ICT, as facilities were becoming available outside Malawi's urban areas. She called on women to educate girls to stand up to sexual and gender based violence. She also reminded women that the law protected widows from their in'laws when they assumed the property of the dead husband. In 2020 she was the Secretary for the Ministry of Labour, Skills and Innovation when children faced the prospect of child labour during the COVID-19 pandemic.

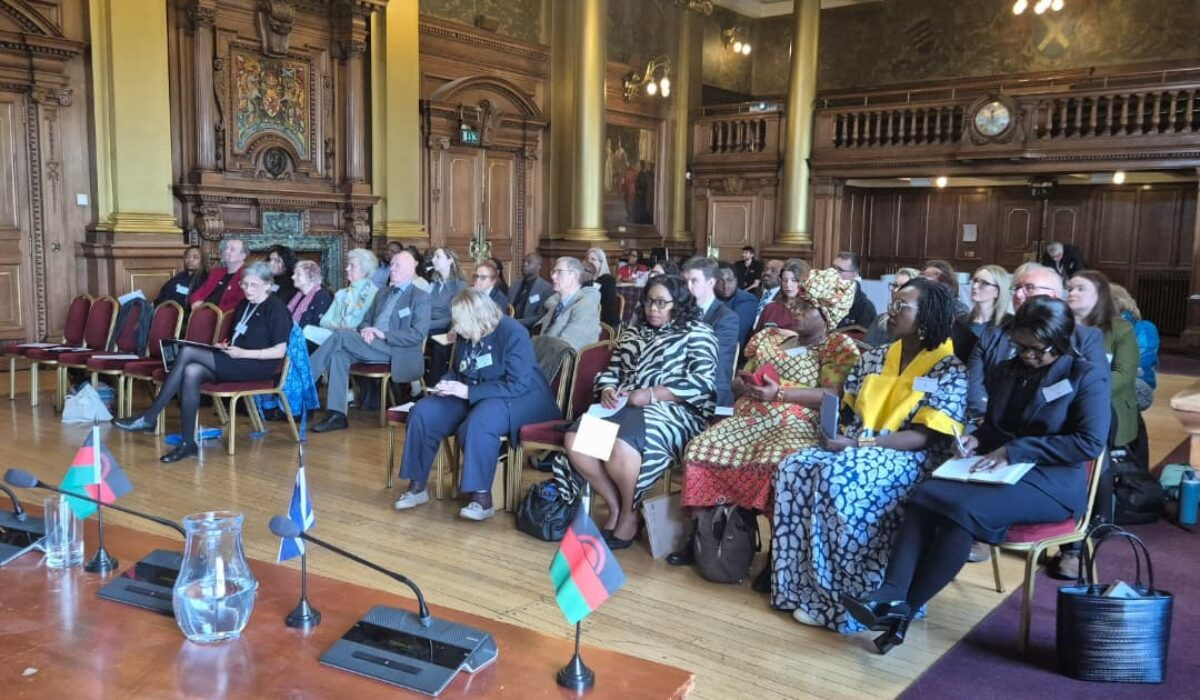
Hon. Mary Navicha in black and white in Edinburgh, Dr. Kainja is on her left

In 2024 she was the Principal Secretary for Local Government, Unity and Culture. She was involved with delivering the government's policy of decentralisation. Progress was slow as the idea of decentralising ministries, department and agencies (MDAs) had been in progress since the millennium. Ministries had resisted the policy and complined that the Ministry of Local Government was seeing itself as a super ministry. Kainja had introduced the idea of a lab that could assist with this task and she was explaining this to USAID who were funding the initiative.

In 2025 she became the Secretary of the Ministry for Gender, Children, Disability and Social Welfare led by Mary Navicha. Kainja was carrying out a policy in support of the Malawi Parliamentary Women's Caucus and their efforts to increase gender equality. In March she and the minister visited Scotland to speak at a Scotland Malawi Partnership event.

Kainja was involved with the Ministry of Gender's work in preparing a four year Albinism Plan which was published in June 2026. A previous plan looked at discrimination, but this plan builds on that to improve the prospects for Malawians who have albinism. It identified poverty as a cause of discrimination.
