= Sara Corner =

Indian beauty pageant contestant

Sara Corner is an Indian model and beauty pageant titleholder who won Femina Miss India 2001 and represented India at Miss World 2001. Corner was born in Kolkata in an Anglo-Indian family. She graduated in Bachelor in Economics.
