= Elizabeth Pullu =

Malawian model and beauty pageant

- Born: 15 June 1978 (age 48); Blantyre, Malawi
- Occupation: Model
- Height: 1.80 m (5 ft 11 in)
- Beauty pageant titleholder
- Title: Miss Malawi 2001
- Major competitions: Miss Malawi 2001 (Winner); Miss Heritage 2001 (Winner)

Elizabeth Pullu (born 15 June 1978) is a Malawian model and beauty pageant titleholder who was crowned Miss Malawi 2001.She is the only pageant to ever represented Malawi at Miss World 2001. She was succeeded by Blandina Khondowe in 2002, where her term came to an end.

== Background ==
=== Early life ===
Pullu was born on 19 October 1978, in Blantyre, the capital of Malawi's Southern Region.

== Pageantry ==
=== Miss Malawi 2001 and Miss World 2001 ===
The Malawi national beauty pageant began in the 1970s in Malawi and was later suspended, commencing again in 2001. Pullu won the title after defeating 20 other contestants in the same year. She also represented Malawi at Miss World 2001.

Awards and achievements
Preceded by commencing again in 2001	Miss Malawi; 2001	Succeeded by Blandina Khondowe
