= Noah Chimpeni =

Malawian politician

- in 2025

Deputy Minister of Health
- Incumbent
- Assumed office 1 January 2025
- President: Lazarus Chakwera
- Preceded by: Halima Alima Daud

Personal details
- Born: 2 February 1968 (age 58) Malawi
- Party: People's Party
- Occupation: Politician

Noah Freeman Chimpeni (born 2 February 1968) is a Malawian politician who was the Malawian Deputy Minister of Health in the cabinet of President Lazarus Chakwera. He was appointed to the position in 2025 as part of a cabinet reshuffle.

== Early life and education ==
Noah was born on 2 February 1968 in Nkhatabay District, northern Malawi. He attended Kamuzu Academy for his secondary education and furthered his education to obtain a bachelor's degree in Social Psychology and English at the Chancellor College (University of Malawi).

== Career ==
Ruthie Markus and Deputy Health Minister, Honourable Noah Chimpeni opening a refurbished health centre in 2025

Before entering elective politics, Chimpeni was a journalist for UDF News and later worked as a Project Coordinator for the then Television Malawi. He joined the People's Party and he was elected to be the member of parliament for Nkhatabay South East Constituency. He married fellow journalist Juwaseka Tolani.

On January 1, 2025, he was appointed as the Malawi minister of health, replacing Halima Alima Daud who held the role until Noah's appointment. The president Lazurus Chakwera was complemented on the appointment because he had appointed Chimpeni despite his association with the People's Party.

Chimpeni opened the refurbished Chilomoni Health Centre in March 2025 which had a new dental and physiotherapy department supported by the Ameca charity.
