= Halima Daud =

Malawian politician

Halima Alima Daud
- Occupation: politician
- Known for: deputy health minister
- Predecessor: Jenipher Deborah Chilunga
- Political party: Malawi Congress Party

Halima Alima Daud sometime Halima Daudi is a Malawian politician and Malawi deputy health minister until January 2025. She was not re-elected in the 2025 general election.

== Life ==
Daud was born in southern Malawi in Nsanje.

She is based in Dowa and she was first elected to parliament in 2009 when 21% of the MPs were women. She lost her Dowa South East constituency seat in 2014. She was not one of 45 women elected that year to a parliament with 193 seats. There had been a campaign to get 50% but this was unsuccessful

She stood for re-election in the 2019 Malawian general election for her former parliamentary seat with the support of the Malawi Congress Party. Five MPs in Dowa failed to be re-elected but Daud and fellow former deputy minister Abel Kayembe both won back their seats. She was one of several Muslim women parliamentarians which included Abida Mia, Aisha Adams, Mwalone Jangiya and Esther Majaza.

In July 2020 President Lazarus Chakwera appointed Khumbize Chiponda as minister of health. Khumbize Chiponda's appointment prompted some accusations of favouritism and nepotism. Daud was one of eight appointed deputy ministers. Chrissie Kanyasho was the deputy at the ministry of health and Daud was assigned to the Ministry of Local Government.

In 2022 Daud was the deputy health minister. In May she went to Rwanda for a week to see their work. In January 2024 she was looking at the effects of giving micro grants as used in Rwanda. At the end of 2024 she spent a week assisting experts who were assessing the overall capabilities of Malawi's health system. This was the second "Joint External Examination" and medical leads were being encouraged to assist. Malawi had faced circumstances that had challenged the medical facilities including cyclone Freddy which had killed hundreds and outbreaks of Cholera had caused half a million vaccinations and this was on top of the COVID-19 pandemic. This study was intended to identify areas where further work was required.

President Lazarus Chakwera replaced her as deputy minister on 1 January 2025. Chakwera was complemented on the appointment of Noah Chimpeni because he had appointed Chimpeni despite his association with the People's Party.

In the 2025 general election, Daud, stood in the Dowa South East constituency. She was beaten by Hope Tionge Zamba who was an independent candidate who attracted over 26,000 votes. Daud had beaten Zamba in the primaries, but Zamba had defied the DPP's choice to win without a party's support.
