= Dowa South East constituency =

Malawian electoral constituency

- First-past-the-post constituency for the Parliament of Malawi
- District: Dowa
- Region: Central Region

Current constituency
- Member: Hope Tionge Zamba (from 2025)

Dowa South East Constituency is a constituency for the National Assembly of Malawi, located in the Dowa District and Central Region of Malawi.

== History ==
In 2016 the Dowa South East Girls Education Project was launched to assist the education of girls in agricultural areas. The work was supported by a fund named for the American academic Virginia Gildersleeve. In 2017 the then MP Harry Njoka Chipeni was lauding this Teams Advancing Women in Agriculture (TAWINA) scheme to improve the education of girls in his constituency. He fell out with his party and accused the Malawi Congress Party (MCP) of supporting former Minister Halima Daudi.

In 2018 there was a dispute over the size of the constituency. Local chiefs wrote to the MCP asking them to resolve the dispute. They feared that the dispute could be grounds for violence.

Hope Tionge Zamba was elected in 2025. She had campaigned as an independent and early results credited her with over 26,000 votes while the incumbent MP, Halima Daud polled less than 4,000 votes. Daud had beaten Zamba in the primaries, but Zamba had defied the DPP's choice to win without a party's support.

== Members of parliament ==
Elections	MP	Party	Notes	References
2009	Halima Daud	DPP	Multi-party system	
	Harry Njoka Chipeni	DPP	Multi-party system	
2019	Halima Daud	MCP	Multi-party system	
2025	Hope Tionge Zamba	(became DPP)	Multi-party system	
