= Miss World 2001 =

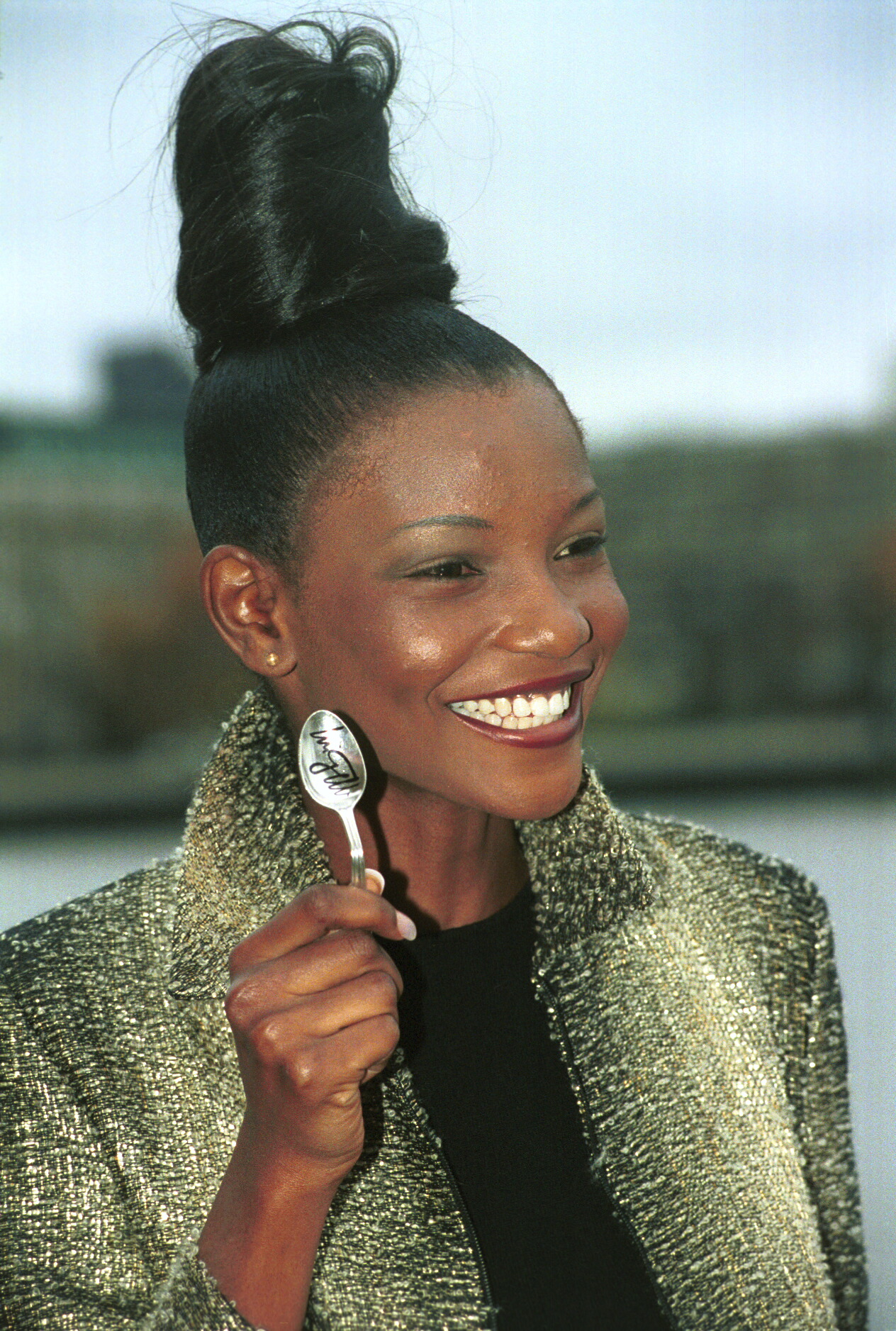
- Agbani Darego, Miss World 2001
- Date: 16 November 2001
- Presenters: Jerry Springer; Claire Elizabeth Smith
- Entertainment: Umoja
- Venue: Super Bowl, Sun City Entertainment Centre, Sun City, South Africa
- Broadcaster: E!; ITV2; IBC Channel 13; SABC 3
- Entrants: 93
- Placements: 10
- Debuts: Malawi
- Withdrawals: Bahamas; Belarus; Curaçao; Denmark; Guatemala; Honduras; Kazakhstan; Lithuania; Moldova; Nepal; Paraguay; Sri Lanka; Taiwan
- Returns: Antigua and Barbuda; China; Guyana; Hawaii; Latvia; Macedonia; Nicaragua; Sint Maarten; Thailand; Uganda
- Winner: Agbani Darego; Nigeria

Miss World 2001 was the 51st edition of the Miss World pageant, held at the Super Bowl of Sun City Entertainment Centre in Sun City, South Africa, on 16 November 2001.

At the end of the event, Priyanka Chopra of India crowned Agbani Darego of Nigeria as her successor. This is the first time Nigeria won the title of Miss World, and the only Nigerian to win the Miss World title so far.

== Background ==
=== Selection of participants ===
Contestants from 93 countries and territories were selected to compete in the competition. Two of these delegates were designees after the original contestant withdrew.

==== Replacements ====
Karol Inés de la Torre, Miss Mundo Colombia 2001, resigned due to accusations of her being married. She was replaced by Jeisyl Amparo Velez. Miss Latvia 2001, Gunta Rudzīte was expected to compete in Miss World 2001, but was replaced by Miss Latvia 1999–2000, Dina Kalandārova for undisclosed reasons.

==== Debuts, returns, and, withdrawals ====
This edition saw the debut of Malawi, and the return of Antigua and Barbuda, China, Guyana, Hawaii, Latvia, Macedonia, Nicaragua, Sint Maarten, Thailand, and Uganda; Hawaii, which last competed in 1959, Antigua and Barbuda in 1991, China in 1994, Macedonia in 1996, Uganda in 1997, Nicaragua and 1998, and Guyana, Latvia, Sint Maarten and Thailand in 1999.

The Bahamas, Belarus, Curaçao, Denmark, Guatemala, Honduras, Kazakhstan, Lithuania, Moldova, Nepal, Paraguay, Sri Lanka and Taiwan withdrew from the competition. Miss Teen Bahamas 2001, Kiara Sherman had to cancel her participation in Miss World 2001 due to lack of time and preparation, and because she wasn't the official winner. Miss Belarus 2000, Anna Stychinskaya did not compete due underage and lack of interest. Miss Denmark 2001, Maj Petersen did not compete due to sponsorship problems, she went to Miss World 2003 instead. Miss Kazakhstan 2001, Gulmira Makhambetova did not compete for unknown reasons. Miss Moldova 2001, Nadezhda Corcimari was supposed to participate in Miss World 2001, but due to her young age the Miss World officials refused her participation.

Miss Egypt World 2001, Sally Shaheen and Miss Uzbekistan 2001, Olesya Loshkareva did not participate in Miss World 2001 as scheduled due to the instability of the Middle East following the terrorist September 11 attacks in New York. Miss Swaziland 2001, Glenda Mabuza was expected to compete, but the local organizers could not reach an agreement with the franchise.

== Results ==
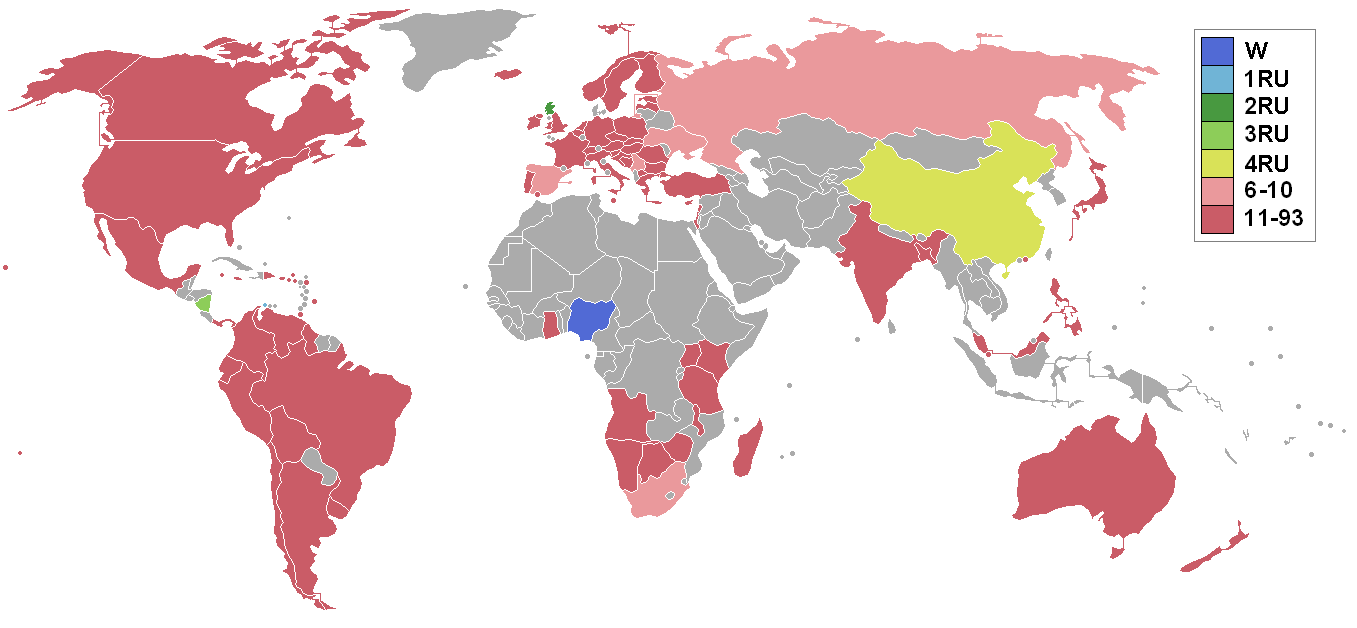
Countries and territories which sent delegates and results for Miss World 2001

=== Placements ===
Placement	Contestant
Miss World 2001	Nigeria – Agbani Darego
1st Runner-Up	Aruba – Zizi Lee
2nd Runner-Up	Scotland – Juliet-Jane Horne
Top 5	China – Bing Li; Nicaragua – Ligia Cristina Argüello
Top 10	Russia – Irina Kovalenko; South Africa – Jo-Ann Strauss; Spain – Macarena García; Ukraine – Oleksandra Nikolayenko; Yugoslavia – Tijana Stajšić

== Contestants ==
93 contestants competed for the title.

Country/Territory	Contestant	Age (Note: Ages at the time of the pageant)	Hometown
Angola	Adalgisa Gonçalves	21	Luanda
Antigua and Barbuda	Janelle Williams	23	Saint John
Argentina	Virginia di Salvo	22	Rosario
Aruba	Zizi Lee	19	Oranjestad
Australia	Eva Milic	23	Gold Coast
Austria	Daniela Rockenschaub	23	Wels
Bangladesh	Tabassum Ferdous Shaon	18	Dhaka
Barbados	Stephanie Chase	22	Bridgetown
Belgium	Dina Tersago	22	Puurs
Bolivia	Claudia Ettmüller	19	Santa Cruz de la Sierra
Bosnia and Herzegovina	Ana Mirjana Račanović	18	Bijeljina
Botswana	Masego Sebedi	22	Gaborone
Brazil	Joyce Aguiar	18	Votuporanga
British Virgin Islands	Melinda McGlore	23	Road Town
Bulgaria	Stanislava Karabelova	23	Sofia
Canada	Tara Hall	21	Toronto
Cayman Islands	Shannon McLean	24	George Town
Chile	Christianne Balmelli	22	Temuco
China	Bing Li	18	Sanya
Colombia	Jeisyl Vélez	20	Caldas
Costa Rica	Piarella Peralta	20	San José
Croatia	Rajna Raguž	17	Drenovci
Cyprus	Christiana Aristotelous	18	Nicosia
Czech Republic	Andrea Fišerová	19	Litoměřice
Dominican Republic	Jeimy Castillo	23	Santo Domingo
Ecuador	Carla Lorena Revelo	19	Quito
England	Sally Kettle	21	Leicester
Estonia	Liina Helstein	23	Tartu
Finland	Jenni Dahlman	21	Turku
France	Emmanuelle Chossat	22	Bourg-en-Bresse
French Polynesia (Note: Competed as Tahiti in the pageant)	Ravanui Terriitaumihau	19	Papeete
Germany	Adina Wilhelmi	21	Wolfach
Ghana	Selasi Kwawu	20	Accra
Gibraltar	Luann Richardson	18	Gibraltar
Greece	Valentini Daskaloudi	22	Athens
Guyana	Olive Gopaul	22	Georgetown
Hawaii	Radasha Hoohuli	21	Honolulu
Holland	Irena Pantelic	22	Rotterdam
Hong Kong	Pui Chi Chung	19	Hong Kong
Hungary	Zsoka Kapocs	22	Budapest
Iceland	Kolbrún Helgadóttir	21	Reykjavík
India	Sara Corner	21	Karnataka
Ireland	Catrina Supple	18	Youghal
Israel	Karen Shlimovitz	22	Tel Aviv
Italy	Paola D'Antonino	19	Messina
Jamaica	Regina Beavers	17	Kingston
Japan	Yuka Humano	21	Nagoya
Kenya	Daniella Kimaru	21	Nairobi
Latvia	Dina Kalandārova	21	Valmiera
Lebanon	Christina Sawaya	21	Bourj Hammoud
Macedonia	Sandra Spasovska	21	Skopje
Madagascar	Tassiana Boba	18	Antananarivo
Malawi	Elizabeth Pullu	22	Mzuzu
Malaysia	Sasha Tan	24	Johor
Malta	Christine Camilleri	19	Valletta
Mexico	Tatiana Rodríguez	20	Campeche
Namibia	Michelle Heitha	25	Windhoek
New Zealand	Amie Hewitt	18	Manukau City
Nicaragua	Ligia Cristina Argüello	21	Managua
Nigeria	Agbani Darego	18	Lagos
Northern Ireland	Angela McCarthy	21	Belfast
Norway	Malin Johansen	22	Troms
Panama	Lourdes González	20	Panama City
Peru	Viviana Rivas	24	Lambayeque
Philippines	Gilrhea Quinzon	19	San Fernando
Poland	Joanna Drozdowska	22	Szczecin
Portugal	Claudia Jesus López	18	Lisbon
Puerto Rico	Bárbara Serrano	23	Vieques
Romania	Vanda Petre	18	Bucharest
Russia	Irina Kovalenko	17	Murmansk
Scotland	Juliet-Jane Horne	18	Aberdeen
Singapore	Angelina Johnson	20	Singapore
Sint Maarten	Genesis Romney	18	Philipsburg
Slovakia	Jana Ivanová	19	Nemšová
Slovenia	Rebeka Dremelj	21	Brežice
South Africa	Jo-Ann Strauss	20	Cape Town
South Korea (Note: Competed as Korea in the pageant)	Hyun-jin Seo	21	Daegu
Spain	Macarena García	23	Seville
Sweden	Camilla Bäck	22	Gothenburg
Switzerland	Mascha Santschi	21	Bern
Tanzania	Happiness Magese	22	Dar es Salaam
Thailand	Lada Engchawadechasilp	21	Songkhla
Trinidad and Tobago	Sacha St. Hill	22	Port of Spain
Turkey	Tuğçe Kazaz	19	Edremit
Uganda	Victoria Nabunya	20	Kampala
Ukraine	Oleksandra Nikolayenko	20	Odesa
United States	Carrie Stroup	19	Fort Lauderdale
United States Virgin Islands (Note: Competed as American Virgin Islands in the pageant.)	Cherrisse Wood	18	Saint Thomas
Uruguay	María Abasolo Cugnetti	22	Montevideo
Venezuela	Andreína Prieto	19	Maracaibo
Wales	Charlotte Faicheney	18	Wrexham
Yugoslavia	Tijana Stajšić	17	Belgrade
Zimbabwe	Nokhuthula Mpuli	18	Harare
