= Barbara Brenner =

American breast cancer activist

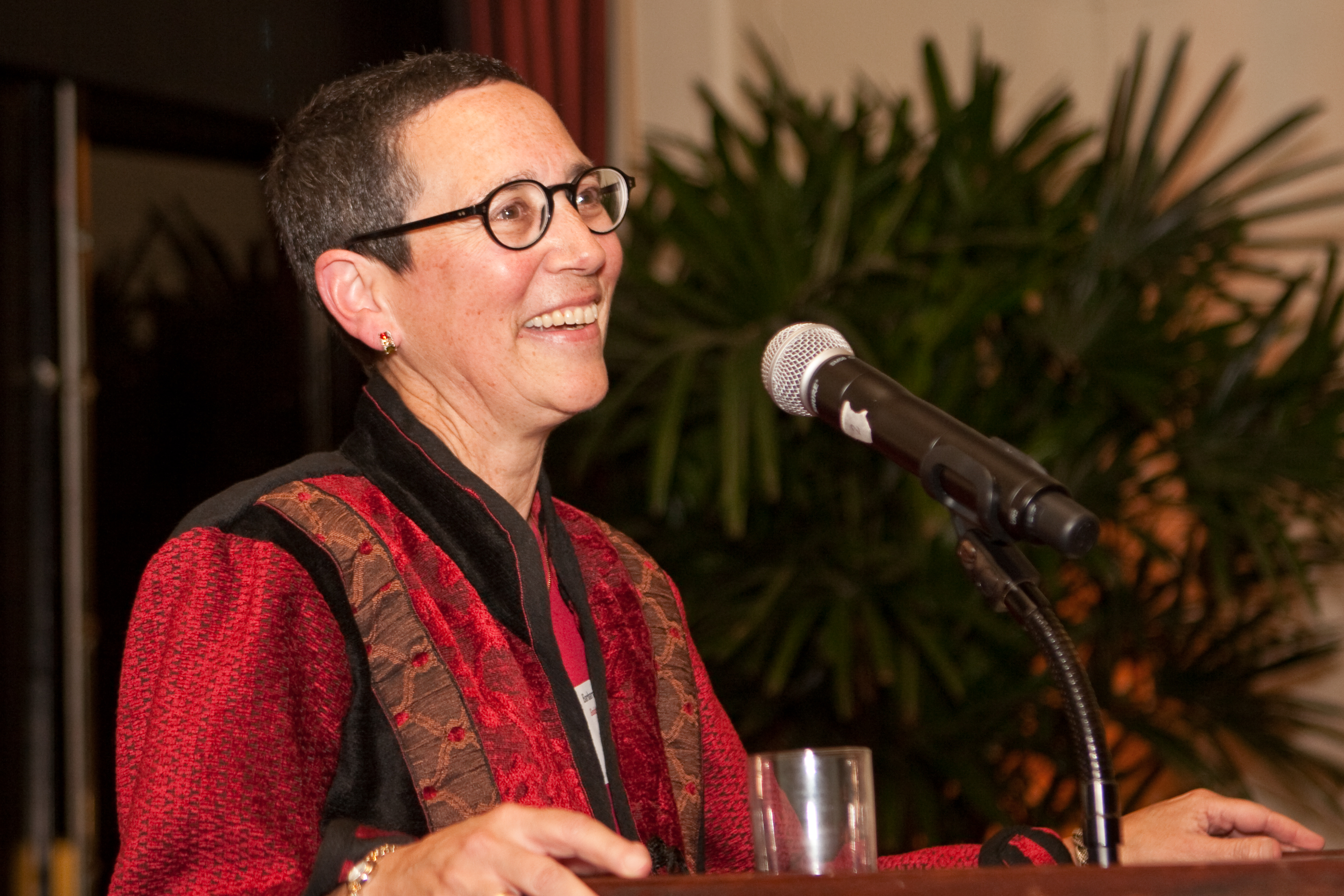

Barbara Brenner (October 7, 1951 - May 10, 2013) was an American breast cancer activist, after activist and legal work on several other causes, including anti-Vietnam War activism, women's rights, civil rights, and employment discrimination. She led the organization Breast Cancer Action, which critiqued orthodoxy regarding the cancer, with which she had been diagnosed in 1993 and 1996. She was partners for 38 years with Suzanne Lampert, her partner since graduate school at Princeton University. She died at the age of 61 on May 10, 2013.
