= Mwalone Jangiya =

- Occupation: politician
- Known for: Muslim member of the National Assembly from 2009 to 2014
- Political party: United Democratic Front

Mwalone Jangiya is a Malawian politician who was a member of the National Assembly from 2009 to 2014.

== Life ==
Jangiya was elected to the National Assembly in 2009. She was a member of the United Democratic Front (UDF) Party and she served until 2014.

In 2013 she was a member of the People's Party. She had a public row with Traditional Authority Sitola of Machinga. He accused her of looking after herself and not her constituents. He noted that bridges over waters infested with crocodiles had not been repaired and people had been killed. He advised his followers not to vote for her.

In 2014 she visited Machinga District Hospital with other Muslims celebrating Eid al-Fitr. They distributed food and presents to the patients there. She was not the only Muslim woman in parliament - the others were Halima Daud, Nasreen Pilan, Abida Mia, Easter Majaza and Amina Lijala.

She stood in the 2018 election as an independent in the Machinga Likwenu constituency and nearly won with over 4,000 votes. However David Lally of the UDF party had about 50 mores than her.

In 2019 she did not stand for election but she endorsed Bright Msaka.
