= Abel Kayembe =

Malawian politician

Abel Kayembe is a Malawian politician, researcher and entrepreneur. He is the Member of Parliament for Dowa West Constituency in Malawi for Malawi Congress Party and former Deputy Minister for Foreign Affairs and International Cooperation.

== Background ==
Ephraim Abel Kayembe was born in 1973 in Dzoole Village, Dowa, Malawi where he grew up and had his early education. He then attained a PhD in International Relations and Political Diplomacy with Central China Normal University and Masters in Science in Strategic Management and BSc with the University of Malawi, Chancellor College.

== Career ==
In 2000, Abel Kayembe was appointed Projects Coordinator for the Ministry of Agriculture, Irrigation and Water Development and in 2005 he joined Food and Agriculture Organisation of the United Nations’ National Water and Irrigation Programme. In 2009, he began his political career with Malawi Congress Party when he contested his first election, 2009 Malawian general election to become Parliamentarian for Dowa West Constituency which he won and he was Member of Parliament for that constituency from 2009 to 2014 when he lost the 2014 Malawian general election to Kusamba Dzonzi. He appointed as acting Leader of Opposition in Parliament in 2009 to 2010.

In 2012, he joined People's Party (Malawi) and was appointed in Malawi cabinet as Deputy Minister of Foreign Affairs and International Cooperation during Joyce Banda’s presidency. During that period, he participated in bilateral meetings over the issue of Lake Malawi boundary dispute with Tanzania. He also chaired inter- ministerial committee that reviewed and developed new governance framework for Malawi. He was then awarded Voluntary Service Overseas Award on Caregivers Policy Advocacy in 2012.

Abel Kayembe in 2019 contested the Dowa West Constituency in the 2019 Malawian general election for the parliamentary seat under Malawi Congress Party. He and former minister Halima Daud both won back their seats. Kayembe was appointed chairperson of the Commonwealth Parliamentary Association the same year. Before winning the 2019 Parliamentary election, Ephraim worked as an adjunct Lecturer of Public Policy Development, Organizational Change Management and Political Economy at Malawi Institute of Management and DMI St. Eugene University of Zambia.

In 2022, Abel Kayembe was appointed chairperson of the Population and Sustainable Development parliamentary committee to advocate for population management the country.
