= Mary Navicha =

Malawian politician

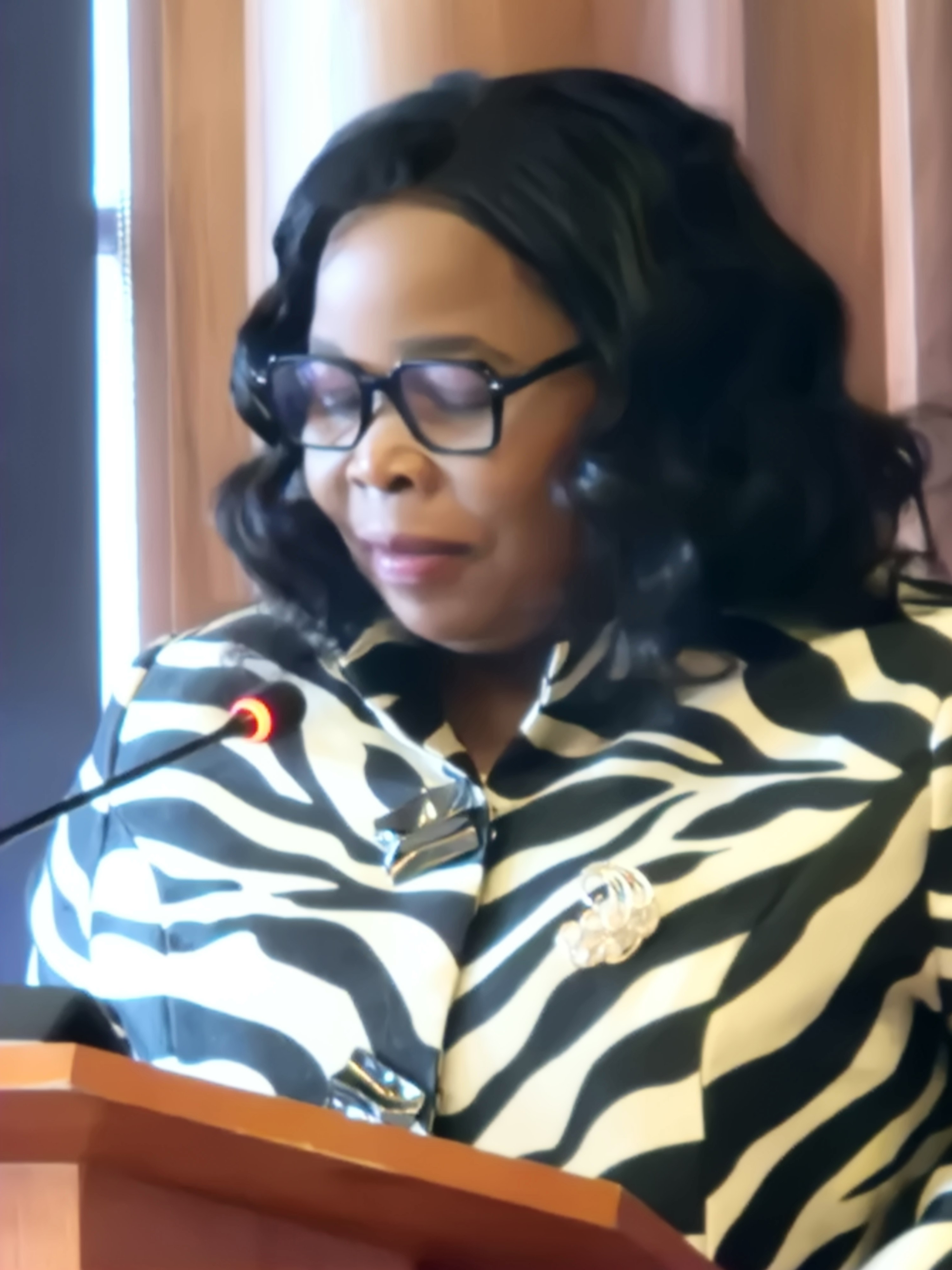
- in 2026
- Occupation: Minister of Gender
- Known for: Minister of Gender and former Leader of the opposition
- Predecessor: Jean Muonawauza Sendeza
- Political party: Democratic Progressive Party
- Children: Irene Navicha

Mary Chisomo Thom Navicha is a Malawian politician who became the leader of the Democratic Progressive Party and the leader of the opposition. She was the first woman to be Leader of Opposition in Malawi. She was re-elected in 2025 and she became the Minister for Gender.

== Life ==
Navicha became the member of parliament in Malawi's National Assembly for the Thyolo Thava constituency, as a member of the Democratic Progressive Party (DPP).

Navicha served as the Minister of Gender, Children, Disability and Social Welfare in 2019. She praised the women of Blantyre when they peacefully showed their support for Jane Ansah. She was the guest of honour at the Tonga Cultural Festival in August at Mkondezi in the Nkhata Bay district together with the Minister of Lands Symon Vuwa Kaunda and the Deputy Minister of Local Government Esther Majaza.

Navicha was the DPP's Director of Women and a member of the cross party Malawi Parliamentary Women's Caucus. She became the Deputy Whip of the DPP but later resigned. The party's leadership became confused and in April 2023 she cautioned that she was considering leaving the party.

In 2023, Naomi Kilekwa was suspended from parliament by the speaker Catherine Gotani Hara after unruly behaviour during President Lazarus Chakwera's state of the union address. She had refused to leave and Thoko Tembo and Victoria Kingstone supported her and they were suspended as well.

In February 2024, the Democratic Progressive Party elected Navicha to be their leader and the leader of the opposition. She was the first woman to hold this position in Malawi. On 15 February, she refused an instruction by the National Assembly's speaker, Catherine Gotani Hara. In September 2023 she thanked Pacific Ltd who had repaired 32 boreholes in her area. Pacific Ltd did this as a gift and they have renewed 8,000 boreholes. When the holes are broken then people use unregulated sources and this is a health risk.

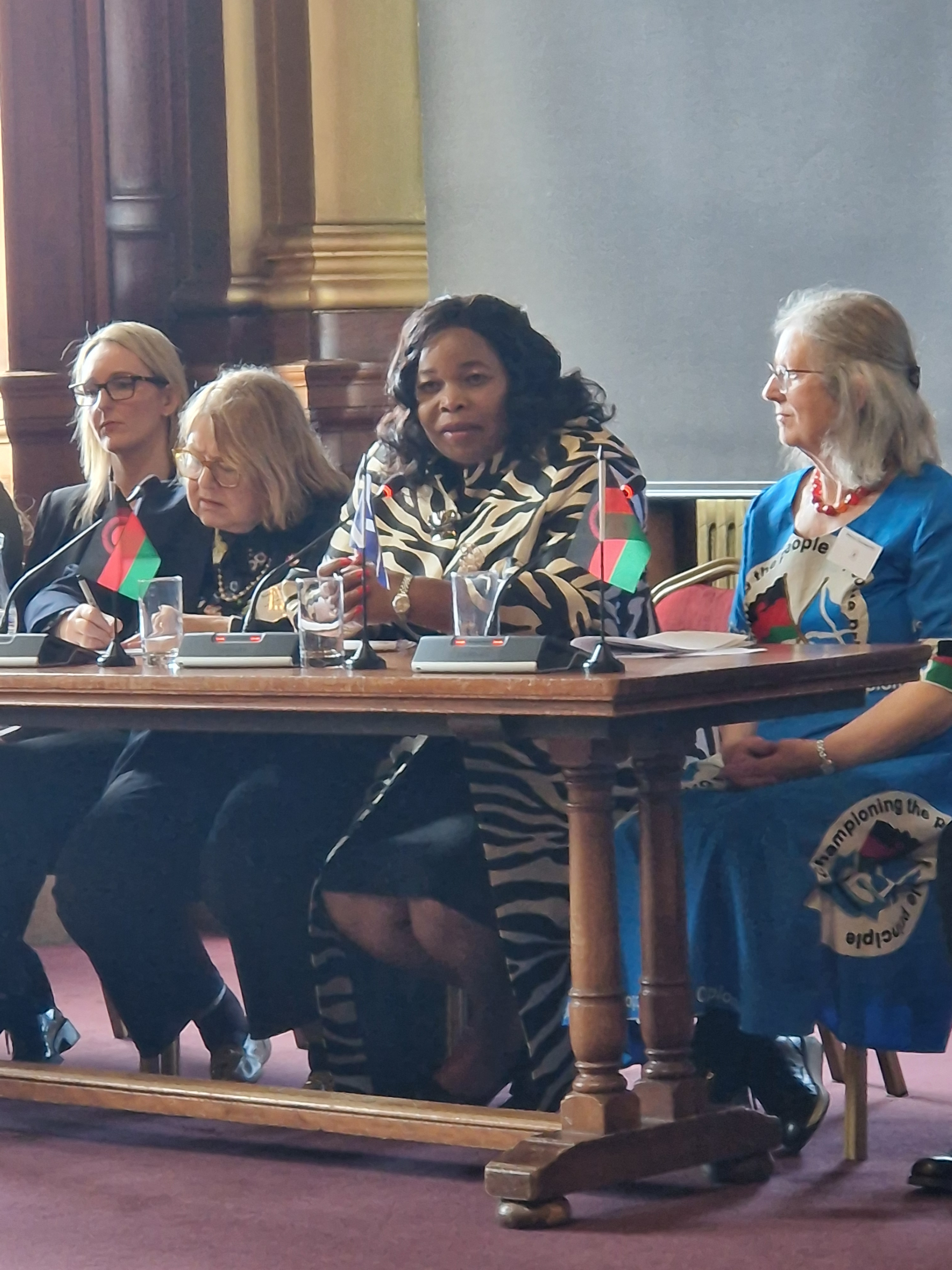
Mary Navicha visiting Edinburgh and the Scotland Malawi Partnership in March 2026

In 2025, Navicha visited Kachere Prison in Lilongwe, to meet the women there. The prison is novel in Malawi because it is women-only. Also in 2025, Navicha was honoured as African Woman of 2024 by the Maravi Post.

She was re-elected to her Thyolo seat in 2025 and she became the Minister of Gender, Children, Disability & Social Welfare. In December she appealed for support for the Miss Malawi competition. The minister's daughter, Irene Navicha, became Mrs Culture Malawi in 2023. She bought a guest table for the event in Lilongwe on 13 December 2025 where Thandi Chisi was crowned Miss Malawi.

In March 2026 she and the Ministry's Secretary Esmie Kainja visited the Scottish Parliament and the Scotland Malawi Partnership in Edinburgh.

Navicha led her ministry's work in preparing a four year Albinism Plan which was published in June 2026. A previous plan looked at discrimination, but this plan builds on that to improve the prospects for Malawians who have albinism. It identified poverty as a cause of discrimination and planned to reduce it.

== Private life ==
Her daughter Irene Navicha was a student at Malawi University of Science and Technology. Irene was aged 19 when she was the runner up in the international Miss Culture Global contest in South Africa in 2024.
