= Esther Majaza =

Malawi politician

- Occupation: politician
- Known for: Deputy Minister
- Political party: Democratic Progressive Party

Esther Asumani Majaza is a Malawi politician who was the Member of Parliament (MP) for Mchinji North East.

== Life ==
Majaza represents Michinji North East in Malawi's National Assembly. She is Muslim, and one of several Muslim women in parliament, including Halima Daud, Nasreen Pilan, Abida Mia, Mwalone Jangiya and Amina Lijala.

Majaza became a Deputy Minister of Local Government in June 2019 following the now discredited May elections when President Peter Mutharika was said to be re-elected. In July she in Kasungu with Madalitso Kazombo who was the First Deputy Speaker of Parliament, the Mayor of Kasungo Socrates Jere and Kasungu Municipal Council's CEO, Grace Chirwa. She spoke at the installation of two traditional chiefs, Simlemba and Chisemphere, and the promotion of Mnyanja. She told the chiefs that they must avoid corruption if they wanted the people's support. She was at the Tonga Cultural Festival in August 2019 at Mkondezi in the Nkhata Bay district together with the Minister of Lands Symon Vuwa Kaunda. Mary Navicha was the guest of honour.

In 2020, there was concern that babies in her constituency were not being vaccinated because their parents found the journey to a medical centre as too far. Majaza arranged for four new clinics for under-fives so that they could be vaccinated.

In 2024, she left her former party and joined the Malawi Congress Party.
