= Dowa, Malawi =

Town in Central Region, Malawi

Dowa
- Town
- Location in Malawi
- Coordinates: 13°40′S 33°55′E
- Country: Malawi
- Region: Central Region
- District: Dowa District

Population (2018 Census)
  - Total: 7,135
- Time zone: +2
- Climate: Cwb

Dowa is a town located in the Central Region of Malawi. It is the administrative capital of Dowa District. William Kamkwamba, author of The Boy Who Harnessed the Wind: Creating Currents of Electricity and Hope, was born and raised in Dowa.

During the 2019 Malawian general election five MPs in Dowa failed to be re-elected but Halima Daud and fellow former deputy minister Abel Kayembe both won back their seats.

== Climate ==
Dowa has a subtropical highland climate (Köppen: Cwb).

Climate data for Dowa, Malawi
Month	Jan	Feb	Mar	Apr	May	Jun	Jul	Aug	Sep	Oct	Nov	Dec	Year
Daily mean °C (°F)	20.2 (68.4)	20.0 (68.0)	20.0 (68.0)	19.0 (66.2)	17.5 (63.5)	15.1 (59.2)	14.8 (58.6)	16.3 (61.3)	19.1 (66.4)	21.3 (70.3)	21.6 (70.9)	20.7 (69.3)	18.8 (65.8)
Average precipitation mm (inches)	245 (9.6)	200 (7.9)	156 (6.1)	36 (1.4)	7 (0.3)	2 (0.1)	1 (0.0)	1 (0.0)	0 (0)	7 (0.3)	59 (2.3)	186 (7.3)	900 (35.3)
Source: Climate-Data.org

== Demographics ==
Year	Population
1977	2,067
1998	4,493
2008	4,765
2018	7,135
