= Aida Mchenga =

Malawian politician

Aida Mchenga MP
- in 2026

Member of Parliament for Dowa West
- Incumbent
- Assumed office 2025

Personal details
- Party: Malawi Congress Party (since 2026); Independent (until 2026)
- Occupation: politician

Aida Chitsosa Mchenga is a Malawian politician who has served as the member of parliament for Dowa West since 2025.

== Political career ==
In the 2025 general election, Mchenga stood as an independent candidate for Dowa West. She was elected to the National Assembly as the member of parliament for the constituency, winning 14,357 votes, or 51.8% of the vote share.

In May 2026, Mchenga joined the Malawi Congress Party. In October Malawi Congress Party (MCP) Secretary General Richard Chimwendo Banda was at a rally to celebrate her joining the party.
