= Irina Kovalenko =

Russian model

Irina Kovalenko (Russian: Ирина Коваленко; 1984 Murmansk) is a Russian model.

She won "Miss Murmansk" and "The Beauty of Russia" titles in 2001. She represented Russia at Miss World pageant same year and she made it to the top-10 finalists.

Irina studied at the Moscow Language Academy. She speaks Russian and English.
