= Dowa District =

District of Malawi

Coordinates: 13°35′S 34°00′E

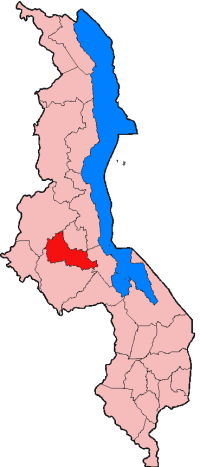
Location of Dowa District in Malawi

Dowa is a district in the Central Region of Malawi. The capital is Dowa.

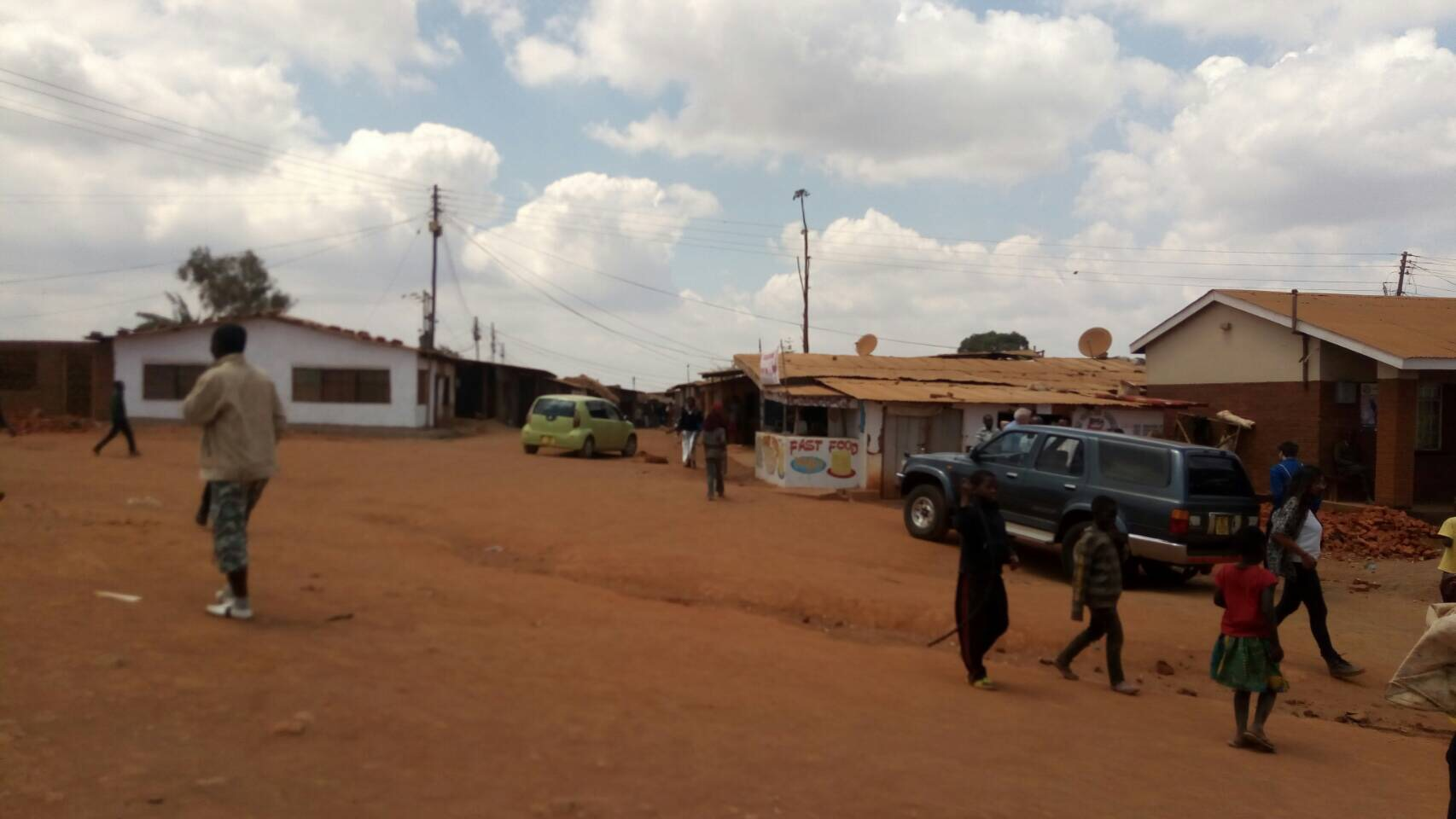
Street in Dowa district, 2019

== Geography ==
The district covers an area of 3,041 km^{2}. and has a population of 556, 678. The capital city, Dowa is home to 5,565 people. Dowa the city is about 38 kilometers away from Malawi's capital city, Lilongwe. The population is projected to reach over 700,000 by 2018.

=== Main cities ===
- Dowa
- Mponela

(MVERA roadblock)

== Demographics ==
At the time of the 2018 Census of Malawi, the distribution of the population of Dowa District by ethnic group was as follows:

- 91.8% Chewa
- 5.9% Ngoni
- 0.6% Yao
- 0.6% Tumbuka
- 0.5% Lomwe
- 0.1% Tonga
- 0.1% Mang'anja
- 0.1% Sena
- 0.0% Nkhonde
- 0.0% Lambya
- 0.0% Nyanja
- 0.0% Sukwa
- 0.3% Others

== Culture ==
The Chewas are the main ethnic group, and second are the Ngonis. Nyau dancing is an integral part of the culture inherited from the Chewa ancestors. These two groups are mostly farming communities. People of the Yao ethnic group are also found, mostly in trading centers.

== Economy ==
Dowa District is an agricultural district which focuses on cotton, tobacco and groundnut farming, and the main food crops produced in the district are maize, sweet potatoes, tomatoes and pulses.

== Education ==
Dowa TTC College opened in 2003. The district aims to drop the high school dropout rate from six percent to four percent by 2020, and also add more classrooms to lower the current 111 to 1 student/classroom ratio.

== Government and administrative divisions ==
There are seven National Assembly constituencies in Dowa:

- Dowa - Central
- Dowa - East
- Dowa - Ngala
- Dowa - North
- Dowa - North West
- Dowa - South East
- Dowa - West

After the 2009 election all of the areas have been controlled by members of the Malawi Congress Party.

In 2026 Aida Mchenga who had been elected as an Independent, joined the Malawi Congress Party, who were not in power. She became the fifth MCP MP from the Dowa District. The remaining five Dowa MPs were independents apart from one member of the DPP.

== Climate ==
Dowa District is in the humid subtropical climate zone, and the mean temperature is about 65 degrees Fahrenheit. There are as many as twenty rainy days a month in the wet season to as little as none in the dry season.
