= Dickson Poon School of Law =

Law school of King's College London

Coordinates: 51°30′40.41″N 0°6′59.65″W

The Dickson Poon School of Law, King's College London
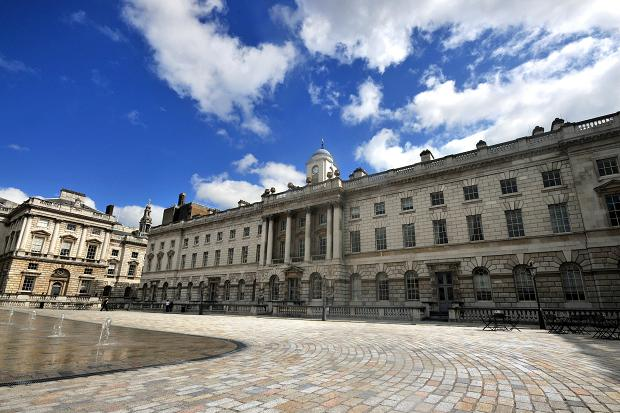
- Former names: Faculty of Laws, King's College, London (1909–1991); King's College London School of Law (1991–2012)
- Established: 1909
- Parent institution: King's College London
- Dean: Dan Hunter
- Faculty: 228
- Students: 1,976
- Location: Somerset House East Wing, London, United Kingdom
- Website: kcl.ac.uk/law
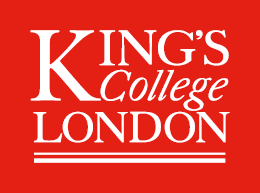

The Dickson Poon School of Law is the law school of King's College London, itself part of the federal University of London, and one of the nine faculties within the college. It is situated on the Strand in the East Wing of Somerset House. The school was named after donor Dickson Poon in 2012.

== History ==
Law has been taught at King's College London since 1831. It was originally taught within the Senior Department. The professor of law was supported only by the fees of their students, with no guaranteed income, and law classes were not popular in the early days of the college. The first professor of law and jurisprudence was John James Park, who was replaced on his death in 1833 by John William Spurrier, who resigned in 1835. He was replaced by Richard Preston, who offered to resign in 1838 in favour of "any gentleman who can secure a class"; Edward Bullock took over the chair in December of that year. In 1840 the "senior department" was renamed the "department of general literature and science" in response to the establishment of the departments of medicine and engineering.

On the departure of Bullock in 1849 the college established a committee to consider the teaching of law, which advised that "What should be aimed at is to give to all, whether intended to be practical lawyers or not, such sound elementary information as may make the former more fitted to enter readily and usefully on a strictly professional course of study; and to give to the latter that acquaintance with the constitution of the country and the spirit and outline of its legal system without which no gentleman or member of any profession can be considered completely educated." The professorship was thus revived in 1851, with G. K. Richards being initially appointed in March 1851 but then resigning without ever lecturing and being replaced by James Stephen in November 1851. At about the same time, a chair of international law was established in 1848 and filled by Travers Twiss in 1849. This was also unsuccessful and lapsed on Twiss's departure to become Regius Professor of Civil Law at Oxford in 1855.

The teaching of commercial law began in 1853, with the appointment of Leone Levi as an external lecturer – unable to be appointed a professor as he was a member of the Free Church of Scotland, and all professors except those in modern languages and oriental literature were required to be members of the Church of England. After some controversy, Levi joined the Church of England in 1855 and was appointed professor of commerce and commercial law the same year, a post he held until his death in 1888. Levi was also made the first dean of the evening department in 1869–70.

At the time of the reconstitution of the University of London as a federal teaching university in 1898, the teaching of law at King's was entirely in evening classes. From 1904 the teaching became aligned with the London LLB degree curriculum and in 1906, due to continuing low student numbers, an inter-collegiate scheme was launched with UCL and the LSE to avoid overlapping teaching, with King's teaching jurisprudence at intermediate level and laws of contract, tort, evidence, property, commerce and private international law at final exam level. By 1912, student numbers had risen to 22 registered at King's and 46 attending King's law classes but registered at other colleges.

The Faculty of Laws was founded in 1909, initially in association with the LSE, and became known as the School of Law in 1991. The school took its current name in 2012 in recognition of Hong Kong businessman Sir Dickson Poon. In February 2012, the school's new home in the East Wing of Somerset House was officially opened by the patron of the college, Queen Elizabeth II.

== Facilities ==
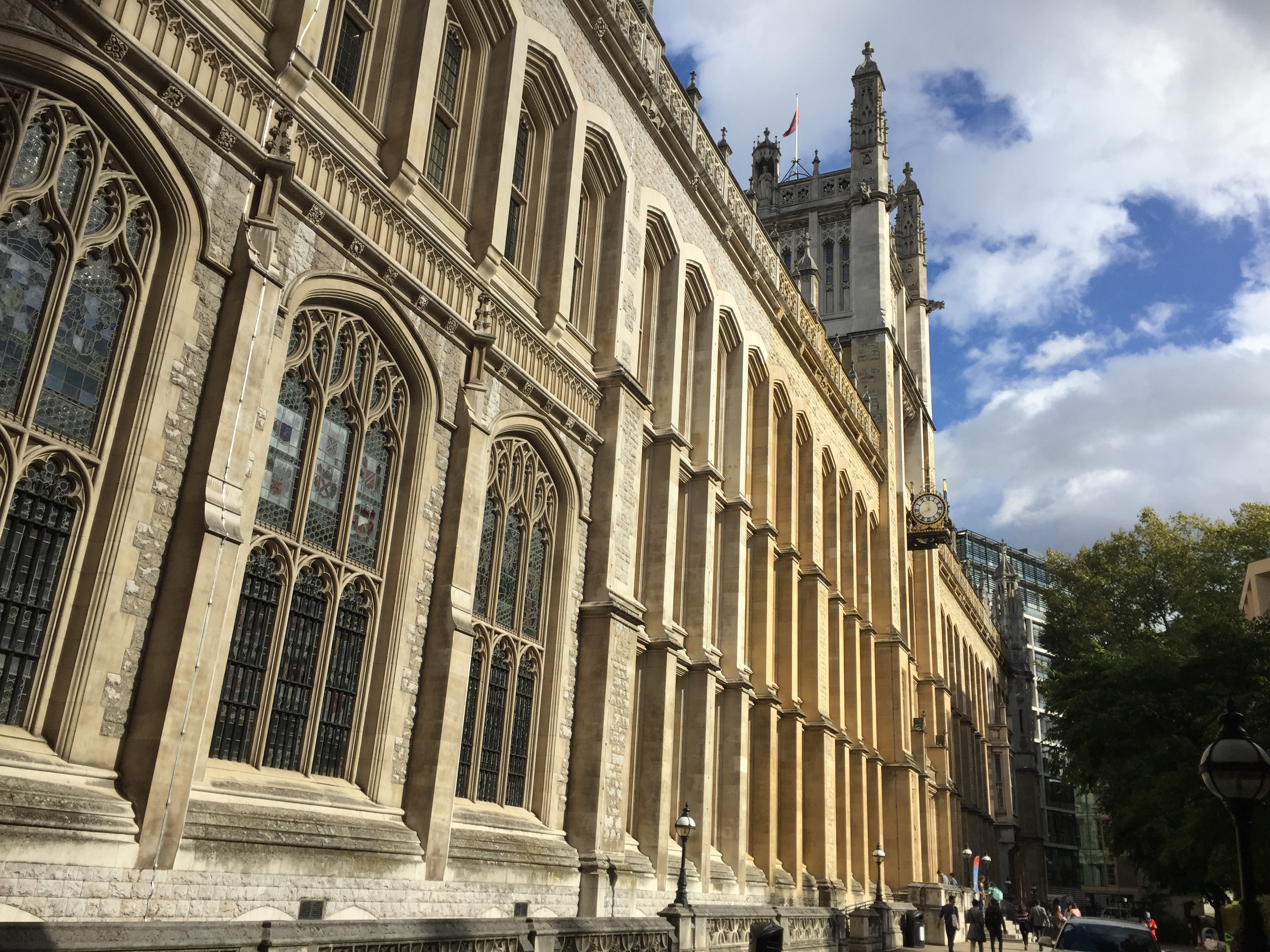
The Maughan Library on Chancery Lane houses the school's law library

The school is housed in the East Wing of Somerset House, a grade I listed building designed by Sir William Chambers in the late eighteenth century in a neoclassical style, adjacent to the main college building. Facilities include a dedicated moot court. The law library is housed in the Maughan Library on Chancery Lane.

== Academic profile ==
=== Education ===
The school provides legal instruction at undergraduate and graduate levels. It offers a three-year undergraduate LLB programme. Candidates are required to take the National Admissions Test for Law (LNAT) as part of the admissions process. In addition to the three-year undergraduate LLB, the school offers a number of joint undergraduate programmes with partner institutions around the world, including Australia (University of Melbourne), France (Paris-Panthéon-Assas University), Germany (Humboldt University), Hong Kong (University of Hong Kong and Chinese University of Hong Kong), Spain (Universitat Pompeu Fabra ) and the United States (Columbia University and Georgetown University).

Taught postgraduate programmes include Master of Laws (LLM) courses, offered on-campus and online, and specialist MA and MSc degrees. The school also offers postgraduate research programmes leading to a PhD in law.

The school is one of six law departments – along with those of University College London, the London School of Economics, Queen Mary University London, the School of Oriental & African Studies and Birkbeck, University of London – that form the laws consortium in the University of London. This consortium collectively oversees and examines the University of London Worldwide's distance learning LLB.

=== Research ===
The school is host to research projects funded by the British Academy, the Economic and Social Research Council, and the European Commission. The school includes various research centres and groups which serve as focal points for research activity. These include the Centre of European Law, established in 1974, the Centre of Medical Law and Ethics, established in 1978, and the Centre of British Constitutional Law and History, established in 1988.

In 2013, the Yeoh Tiong Lay Centre for Politics, Philosophy & Law was established following a £7 million gift from Mark Yeoh (LLB graduate) and his family.

The school has undertaken significant investment in the field of transnational law in recent years and has established an Institute of Transnational Law led by Peer Zumbansen.

=== Publications ===
The school publishes the scholarly King's Law Journal, as well as the King's Student Law Review. The Centre of European Law publishes a paper series, Working Papers in European Law. The International State Crime Initiative publishes a range of reports, commentaries, and other materials on state crime. The faculty at the school are regular authors of monographs, scholarly treatises and articles, and contributions to periodicals. Latest publications from the Dickson Poon School of Law are available on King's Research Portal.

=== Reputation ===
King's College London was ranked 7th for law in the UK in 2025 by The Guardian and 5th by the 2025 Complete University Guide. For 2026, it was ranked 16th globally for law and legal studies in the QS University Rankings, and 26th in the world for law by Times Higher Education.

== Notable people ==
=== Academics ===
- Ben Bowling, professor of criminology and criminal justice and former acting dean of the Dickson Poon School of Law
- David Caron, professor of law and former dean of the Dickson Poon School of Law
- Gillian Douglas, professor of family law and dean of the Dickson Poon School of Law
- Keith Ewing, professor of public law
- Sir Francis Jacobs, professor of European law and president of the Centre for European Law
- Igor Judge, Baron Judge, Dickson Poon distinguished visitor, Lord Chief Justice of England and Wales (2008-2013), convenor of the Crossbench Peers in the House of Lords
- Lady Hale, visiting professor, president of the Supreme Court of the United Kingdom (2017-2020)
- Eva Lomnicka, visiting professor
- Aileen McColgan, professor of human rights law
- John Phillips, professor of law
- Nicholas Phillips, Baron Phillips of Worth Matravers, Dickson Poon distinguished visitor
- Raymond Plant, Baron Plant of Highfield, professor of law
- Joseph Raz, research professor of jurisprudence
- Takis Tridimas, professor of European law
- John Tasioulas, professor of politics, philosophy and law and director of the Yeoh Tiong Lay Centre for Politics, Philosophy & Law
- Phillipa Webb, professor of Public International Law
- Peer Zumbansen, professor of transnational law and director of the Transnational Law Institute

=== Alumni ===
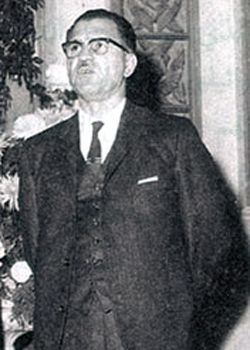
Abd al-Rahman al-Bazzaz

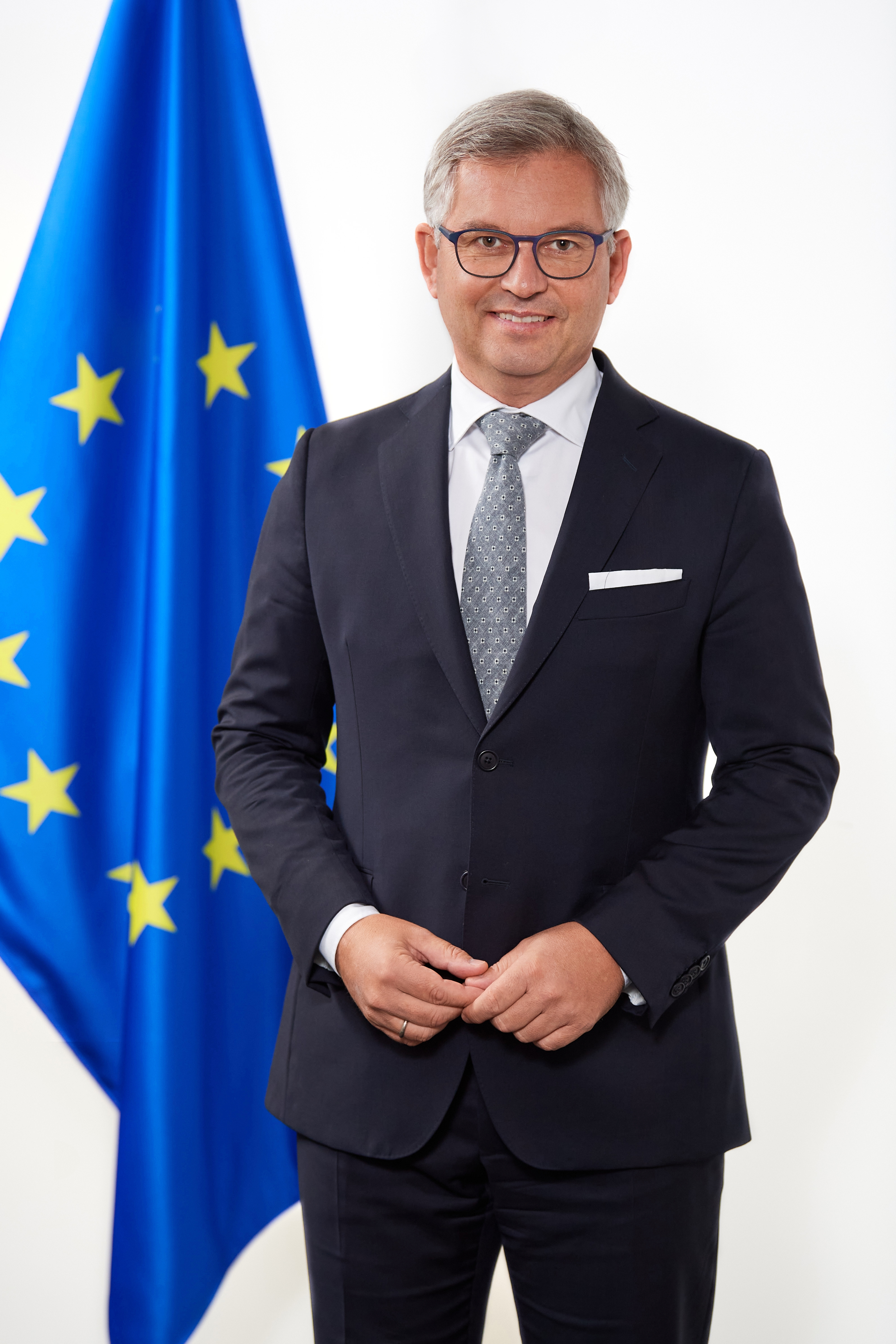
Magnus Brunner

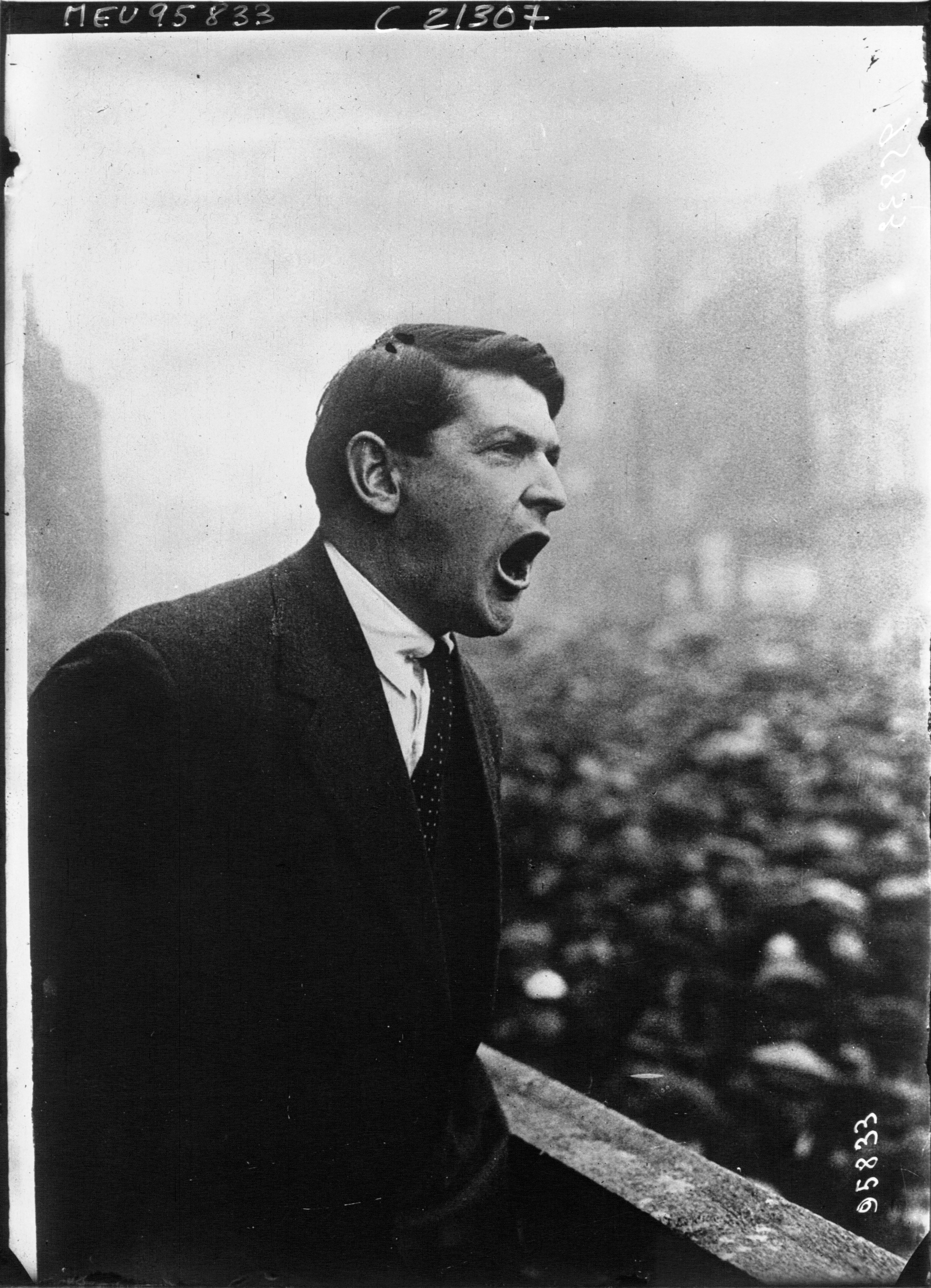
Michael Collins

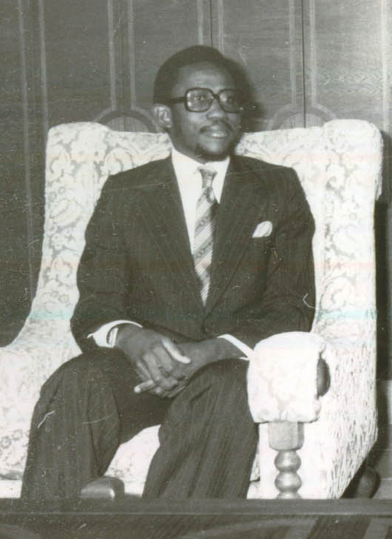
Abdulai Conteh

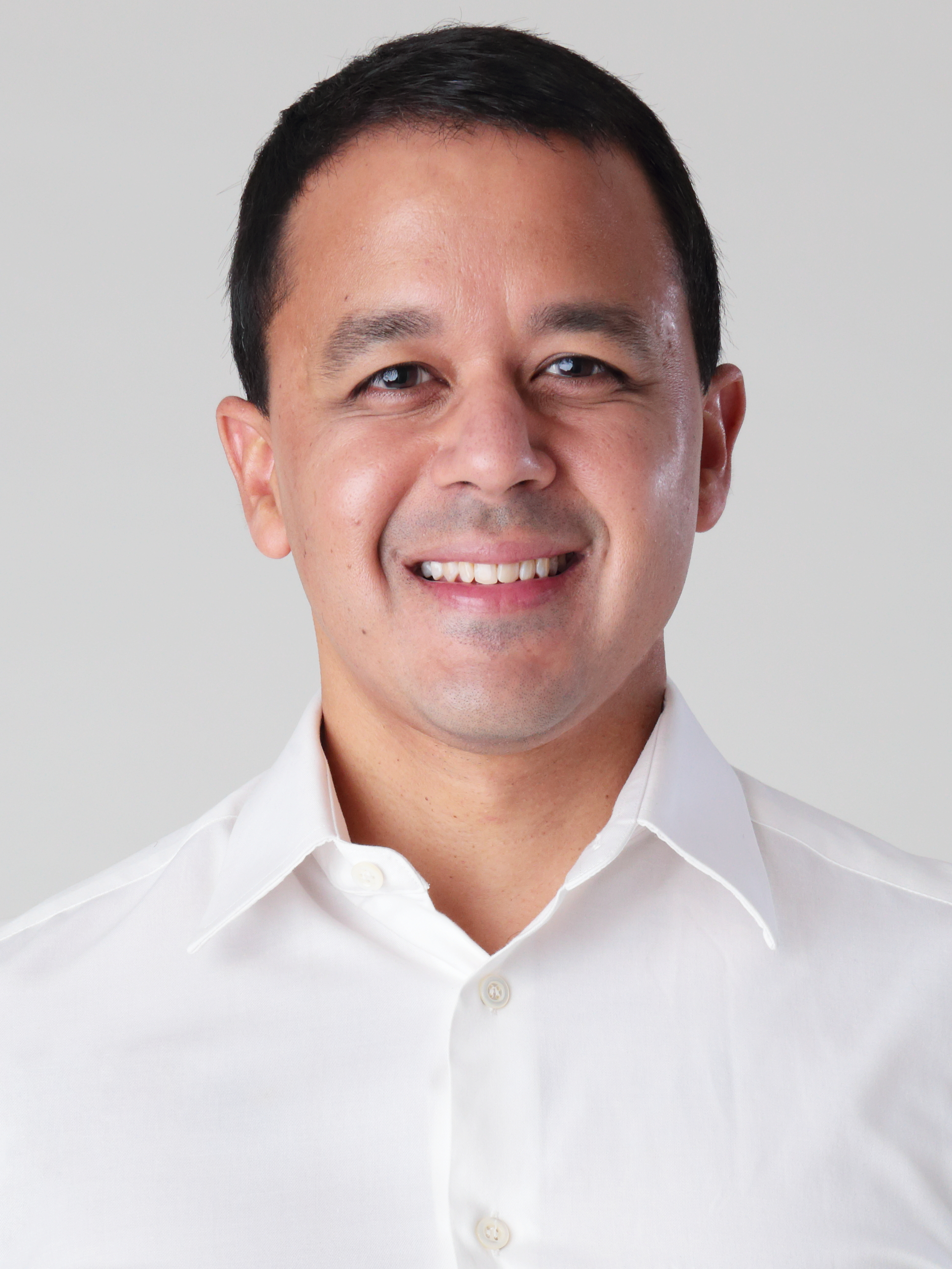
Christopher de Souza

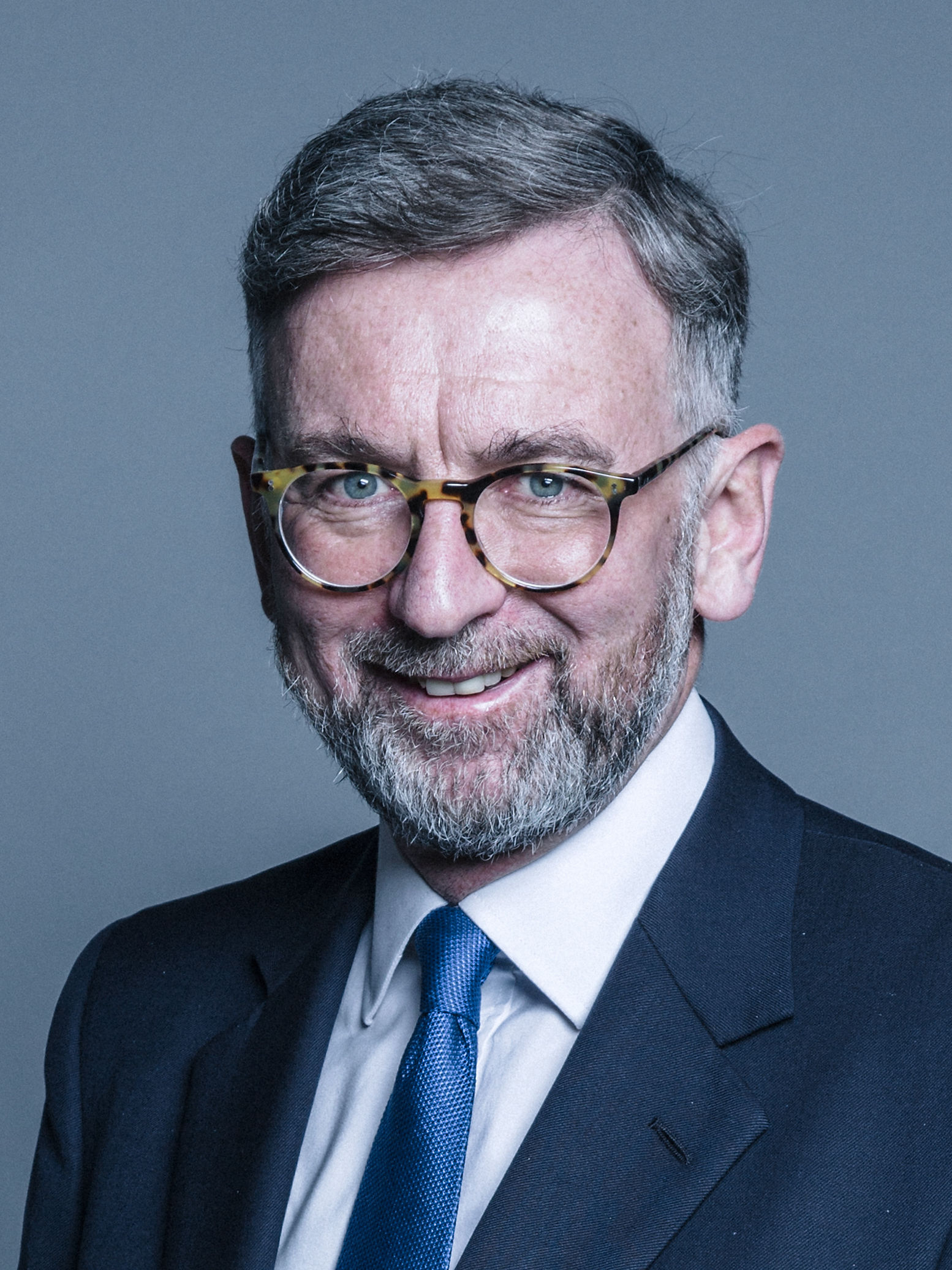
Lord Dunlop

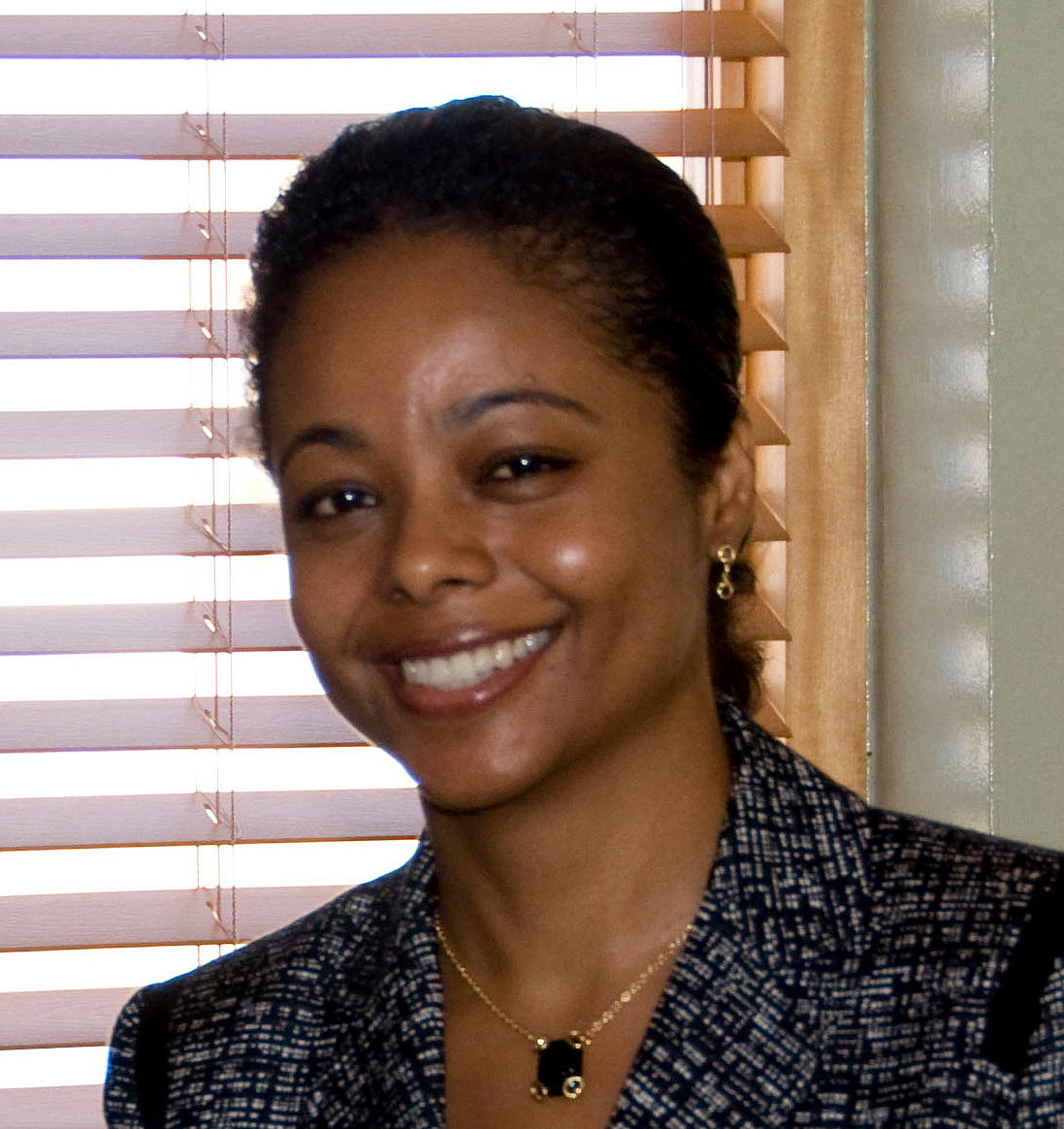
Marlene Malahoo Forte

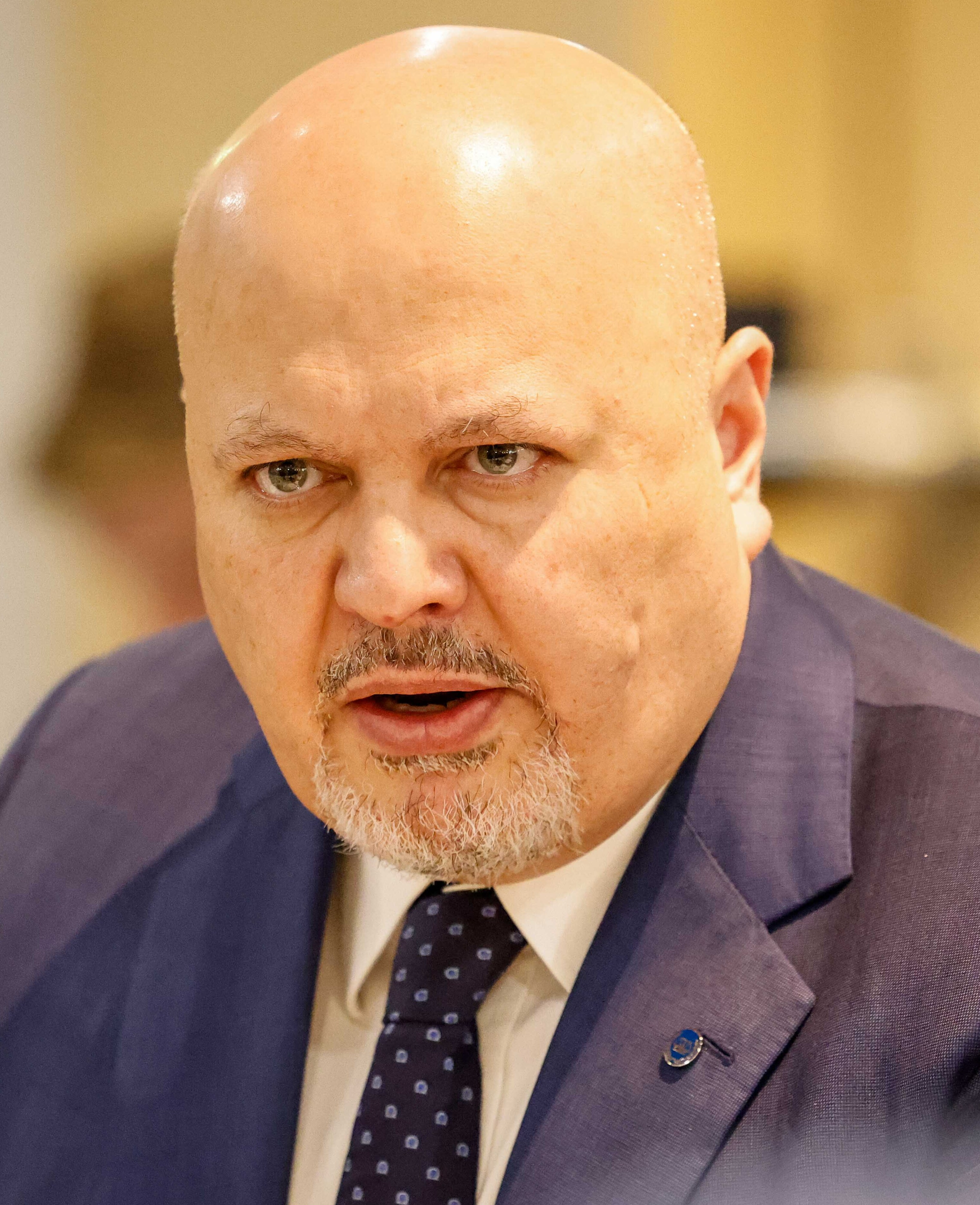
Karim Ahmad Khan

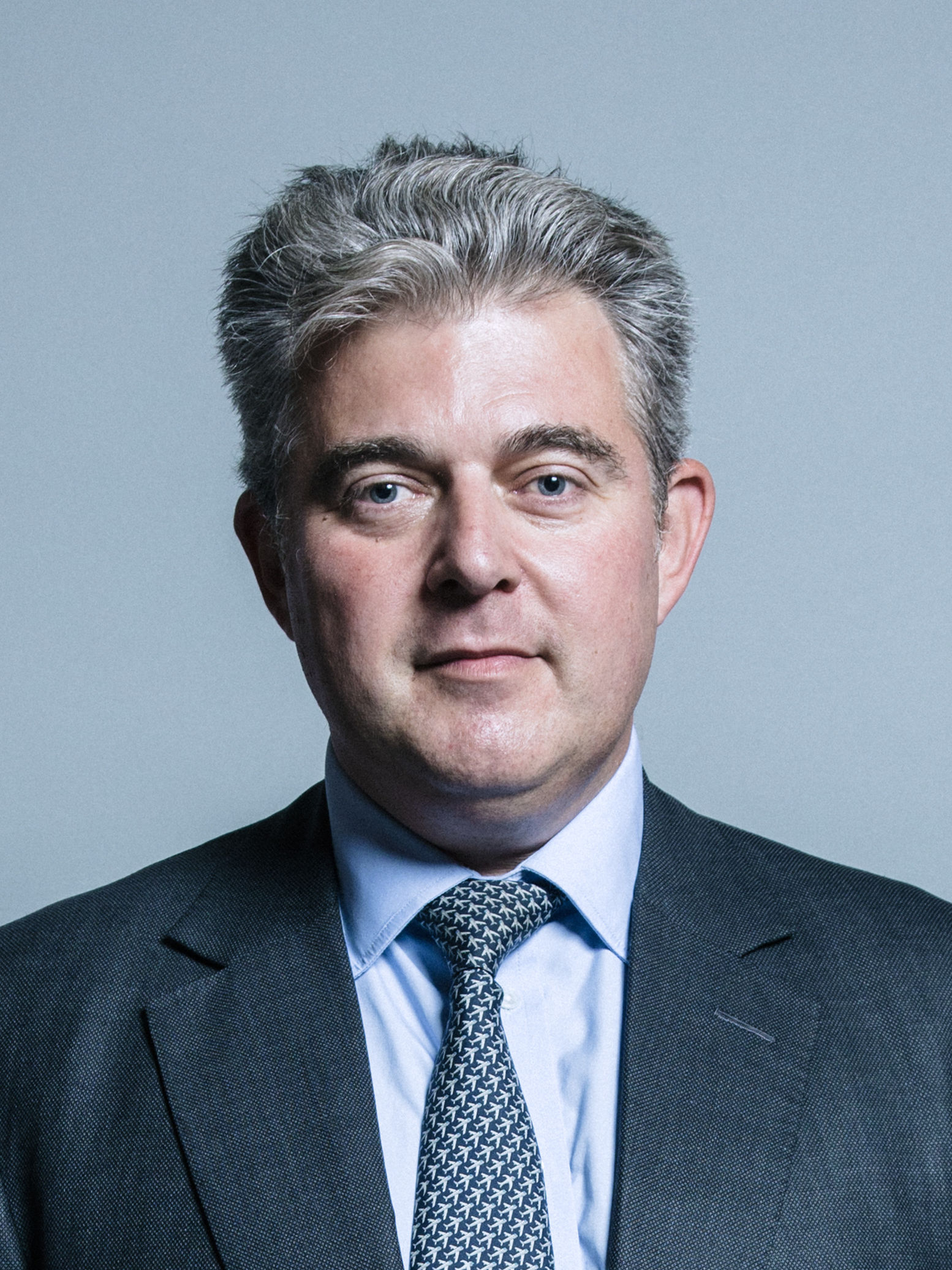
Brandon Lewis

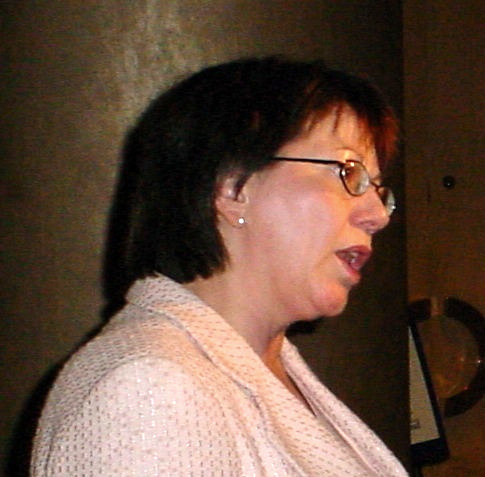
Anne McLellan

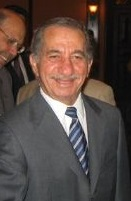
Tassos Papadopoulos

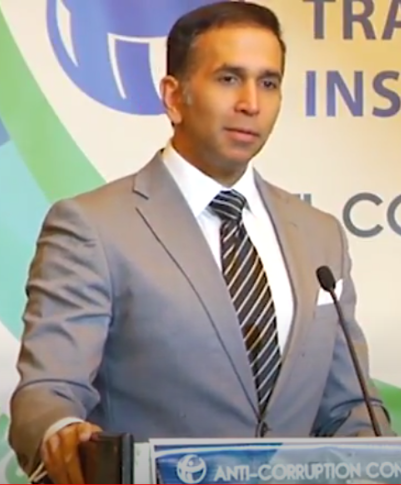
Faris Al-Rawi

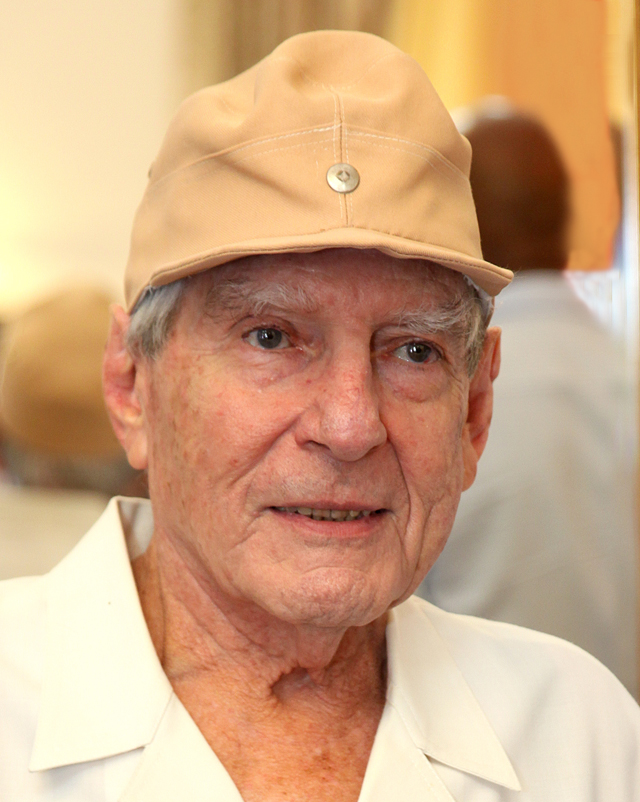
France-Albert René

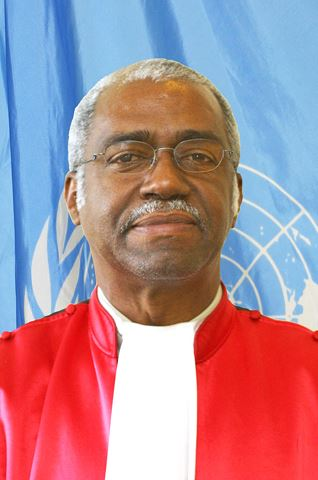
Patrick Lipton Robinson

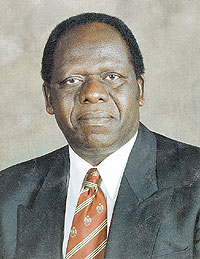
Michael Kijana Wamalwa
- Kwadwo Agyei Agyapong, Ghanaian High Court judge
- Karim Ahmad Khan, Chief Prosecutor of the International Criminal Court
- Shafique Ahmed, Bangladeshi Justice Minister
- Michael Ashikodi Agbamuche, Attorney General & Minister for Justice of Nigeria (1994–97)
- Brian Altman, lead Counsel for the Independent Inquiry into Child Sexual Abuse
- Georgios Anastassopoulos, Greek MEP
- Dame Geraldine Andrews, High Court Judge (2013–)
- Sir Robin Auld, Lord Justice of Appeal
- Azhar Azizan Harun, Speaker of the Dewan Rakyat
- Ziad Bahaa-Eldin, Deputy Prime Minister of Egypt
- Eddy Balancy, Acting President of Mauritius (2019)
- Abd al-Rahman al-Bazzaz, Prime Minister of Iraq (1965–66)
- Godfrey Binaisa, President of Uganda (1979–80)
- Sir Patrick Bishop, Conservative Member of Parliament
- Sir Louis Blom-Cooper, author and lawyer
- Harold Bollers, Chief Justice of Guyana (1966–80)
- Terence Boston, Baron Boston of Faversham, Labour Member of Parliament and Crossbench peer
- Magnus Brunner, European commissioner
- Haresh Budhrani, Speaker of the Gibraltar Parliament
- Alex Carlile, Baron Carlile of Berriew
- Dame Bobbie Cheema-Grubb, High Court Judge (2015–)
- Sir Fielding Clarke, Chief Justice of Fiji, Hong Kong and Jamaica
- Glafcos Clerides, President of Cyprus (1993–2003)
- Stanley Clinton-Davis, Baron Clinton-Davis, Labour Member of Parliament and peer and UK EU Commissioner
- Michael Collins - Chairman of the Irish Provisional Government (1922)
- Abdulai Conteh, Vice President of Sierra Leone
- Philippe Couvreur, Registrar of the International Court of Justice
- Edmund Davies, Baron Edmund-Davies, Lord of Appeal in Ordinary (1974–1981)
- Sushmita Dev, Member of the Indian Lok Sabha
- Andrew Dunlop, Baron Dunlop, Conservative peer
- Jerome Fitzgerald, Bahamian Education Minister
- Marlene Malahoo Forte, Attorney General of Jamaica
- Sir David Foskett, High Court Judge (2007–)
- Sir Cyril Fountain, Chief Justice of the Bahamas
- Alan Ganoo, Speaker of the National Assembly of Mauritius
- Harry Gem, inventor of the lawn tennis
- Colleen Graffy, US Deputy Assistant Secretary of State
- Dame Katherine Grainger, Olympic gold medal winning rower
- Faisal Saleh Hayat, Pakistani Interior Minister
- Anisul Huq, Bangladeshi Justice Minister
- Chukwunweike Idigbe, Justice of the Supreme Court of Nigeria
- Faizah Jamal, Member of the Singaporean Parliament
- K. C. Kamalasabayson, Attorney General of Sri Lanka
- Olga Kefalogianni, Greek Cabinet Minister
- Cecil Kelsick, Chief Justice of Trinidad and Tobago
- Asma Khan, chef and cookbook author
- Sir Muhammad Zafarullah Khan, President of the UN General Assembly (1962–63); President of the ICJ (1970–73)
- Sir Leonard Knowles, first Chief Justice of The Bahamas
- Abdul Koroma, Judge of the International Court of Justice
- Dennis Kwok, Member of the Hong Kong Legislative Council
- Francine Lacqua, Bloomberg Television anchor
- David Nana Larbie, Member of the Ghanaian Parliament
- Axelle Lemaire, Member of the French National Assembly
- Brandon Lewis, Chairman of the Conservative Party
- John MacGregor, Baron MacGregor of Pulham Market, politician; Leader of the House of Commons (1990–92)
- Jonathan Maitland, broadcaster
- Nthomeng Majara, Chief Justice of Lesotho
- Wayne Martin, former Chief Justice of Western Australia (2006–2018)
- Peter McCormick, lawyer
- Hugh McDermott, Member of the New South Wales Parliament
- Anne McLellan, Deputy Prime Minister of Canada
- Francis Minah, Vice President of Sierra Leone
- Trevor Moniz, Attorney General of Bermuda
- Sir Lee Moore, Prime Minister of Saint Kitts and Nevis (1979–80)
- Krisztina Morvai, Hungarian MEP
- Nik Nazmi Nik Ahmad, Malaysian Minister of Natural Resources, Environment and Climate Change
- Ned Nwoko, Member of the Nigerian House of Representatives
- Chibudom Nwuche, Member of the Nigerian House of Representatives
- George Nyamweya, Member of the Kenyan National Assembly
- James Nyamweya, Kenyan Foreign Minister
- Nuala O'Loan, Baroness O'Loan, Crossbench peer
- Sam Okudzeto, Member of the Ghanaian Parliament
- Nneka Onyeali-Ikpe, CEO of Fidelity Bank Nigeria
- Tassos Papadopoulos, President of Cyprus (2003–08)
- Sir David Penry-Davey, High Court judge
- Sir Lynden Pindling, Prime Minister of the Bahamas (1967–92)
- Sir Allan Powell, previous Chairman of the BBC
- Tim Pryce, CEO of Terra Firma Capital Partners
- Henry George Purchase, Liberal Member of Parliament
- S. Rajaratnam, Deputy Prime Minister of Singapore
- Sir Shridath Ramphal, Commonwealth Secretary-General (1975–90)
- Sophon Ratanakorn, President of the Supreme Court of Thailand
- Faris Al-Rawi, Attorney General of Trinidad and Tobago and Member of the House of Representatives
- France-Albert René, President of the Seychelles (1977–2004)
- Patrick Lipton Robinson, Judge of the International Court of Justice
- Sir Hugh Rossi, Conservative Member of Parliament
- Dame Angela Rumbold, Conservative Member of Parliament
- Julius Sarkodee-Addo, Chief Justice of Ghana
- Dan Sarooshi, Professor of Public International Law at the University of Oxford
- Khushwant Singh, writer and Member of the Indian Rajya Sabha
- Muthucumaraswamy Sornarajah, C. J. Koh Professor of Law at the National University of Singapore
- Christopher de Souza, Member of the Singaporean Parliament
- Gary Streeter, Conservative Member of Parliament
- Sir Jeremy Sullivan, Lord Justice of Appeal (2009–2015); Senior President of Tribunals (2012–2015)
- Jaishanker Manilal Shelat, Judge, Supreme Court of India (1966–72)
- Rory Tapner, CEO of Coutts
- Shekou Touray, Permanent Representative of Sierra Leone to the United Nations
- Hassan al-Turabi, Sudanese Foreign Minister and Attorney General
- Lawrence Urquhart, Chairman of BAA
- Muhammad Uteem, Member of the Mauritian National Assembly
- Michael Kijana Wamalwa, Vice President of Kenya
- Sidney Webb, 1st Baron Passfield, co-founder of London School of Economics
- Dame Heather Williams, High Court Judge (2021–)
- Frederick Wills, Guyanese Foreign Minister
- Elizabeth Wilmshurst, Professor of International Law at University College London
- Alvin Yeo, Member of the Singaporean Parliament
- Lois Michele Young, Permanent Representative of Belize to the United Nations
