= King's Law Journal =

- Discipline: British law, General law
- Language: English
- Edited by: Keith Ewing

Publication details
- Former name(s): King's College Law Journal
- History: 1990–present
- Publisher: Taylor & Francis
- Frequency: Triannually

Standard abbreviations
- ISO 4: King's Law J.

Indexing
- ISSN: 0961-5768

King's Law Journal is published for The Dickson Poon School of Law at King's College London by Taylor & Francis. It was established in 1990 as King's College Law Journal and changed to the present title in 2007. It publishes peer-reviewed scholarly articles, notes, reports, and book reviews. The general editor is Keith Ewing.
