= Raymond Plant =

British politician and academic (born 1945)

The Right Honourable The Lord Plant of Highfield FKC

Member of the House of Lords
- Lord Temporal
- Life peerage 24 July 1992 – 28 February 2024

Personal details
- Born: Raymond Plant; 19 March 1945 (age 81)
- Party: Labour
- Education: King's College London; University of Hull
- Occupation: Academic

Raymond Plant, Baron Plant of Highfield, FKC (born 19 March 1945), is a British Labour peer and academic.

== Life and works ==
Lord Plant was educated at Havelock School in Grimsby, King's College London (BA Philosophy, 1966), and the University of Hull (PhD). He is Professor of Jurisprudence and Political Philosophy at King's College London and was previously Professor of Divinity at Gresham College, having previously served as Master of St Catherine's College, Oxford, from 1994 to 2000. He is an Honorary Fellow of Harris Manchester College, Oxford. Before moving to Oxford he was Professor of European Political Thought at the University of Southampton, and prior to that was a Senior Lecturer in philosophy at the University of Manchester.

He was created a life peer on 24 July 1992 as Baron Plant of Highfield, of Weelsby in the County of Humberside, and was introduced to the House of Lords on 4 November. Plant was a member of the Nuffield Council on Bioethics from 2004 to 2007. In the Lords he was a member of the Joint Committee on Human Rights and has been a member of the Government and Law Sub Committee of the Committee on the European Communities. He is the author of several books on political philosophy, and was formerly a lay canon at Winchester Cathedral. Plant retired from the Lords on 28 February 2024.

=== Selected publications ===
- Plant, Raymond (2013). Hegel. doi:10.4324/9781315017143. ISBN 978-1-136-52625-1.

Academic offices
Preceded by Sir Brian Smith	Master of St Catherine's College, Oxford; 1994–2000	Succeeded by Sir Peter Williams
Preceded by John Phillips	Head of King's College London School of Law; 2005–2008	Succeeded by Timothy Macklem
Orders of precedence in the United Kingdom
Preceded by The Lord Eatwell	Gentlemen; Baron Plant of Highfield	Followed by The Lord Woolf
