= McColgan =

McColgan is an Irish surname. Notable people with the surname include:

- Aileen McColgan, British academic
- Bill McColgan (died 1973), American sportscaster and play-by-play announcer
- Caolan McColgan, Gaelic footballer
- Eilish McColgan (born 1990), Scottish middle-distance runner
- John McColgan, Irish director and co-founder of Riverdance
- Liz McColgan (born 1964), Scottish long-distance runner
- Mike McColgan, American singer
- Peter McColgan (born 1963), Northern Irish athlete
- Quinn McColgan (born 2002), American actress
