= Anthony Guest =

British barrister and legal scholar

Anthony Gordon Guest, CBE, KC, FBA (born 8 February 1930), often published as A. G. Guest, is a British barrister and legal scholar. He was professor of English law at the King's College London from 1966 to 1997, having previously been a fellow of University College, Oxford, from 1955 to 1965. He specialises in the law of contracts, especially relating to sale of goods, negotiable instruments and consumer credit.

Guest was made a Queen's Counsel (QC; now King's Counsel, KC) in 1987. He was appointed a Commander of the Order of the British Empire (CBE) in the 1989 New Year Honours for services to the UN Commission on International Trade Law, and elected a fellow of the British Academy in 1993.

== Publications ==
- (editor) Anson's Principles of the Law of Contract (edns 21 to 26, Oxford: Oxford University Press, 1959–1984)
- (general editor) Chitty on Contracts (edns 23 to 27, London: Sweet and Maxwell, 1968–1994)
- (editor) Oxford Essays on Jurisprudence (Oxford: Oxford University Press, 1961)
- The Law of Hire-Purchase (London: Sweet and Maxwell, 1966)
- (editor) Benjamin's Sale of Goods (edns 1 to 6, London: Sweet and Maxwell, 1974–2002)
- (editor, with Michael G. Lloyd and Eva Z. Lomnicka) Encyclopedia of Consumer Credit Law (London: Sweet and Maxwell, 1975)
- (with Eva Z. Lomnicka) Introduction to the Law of Credit and Security (London: Sweet and Maxwell, 1978)
- (editor) Chalmers and Guest on Bills of Exchange (edns 14 to 15, London: Sweet and Maxwell, 1991–1998)
- Guest on the Law of Assignment (London: Sweet and Maxwell, 2012)
- (with Paul Matthews) The Law of Treasure (Oxford: Archaeopress, 2018)
