= King's College London Law Society =

Student society in England

- Institution: King's College London
- Location: The Dickson Poon School of Law, Somerset House West Wing, Strand, London.
- President: Kai En Ho
- Website: https://www.kcllawsociety.com/

King's College London Law Society (also known as "KCL Law Society" or "KCLLS") is a student society in England. Affiliated with the King's College London Dickson Poon School of the Law, the society aims to offer members with the opportunity acquaint themselves with the legal profession and equip them with the skills needed to succeed in legal practice.

The society organises a range of vocational and social events, including the annual Law Ball in March.
