= Grace Malie =

Tuvaluan climate activist

- Born: c. 1999; Tuvalu
- Education: University of the South Pacific
- Known for: Advocacy on sea level rise in Tuvalu

Grace Malie (born c. 1999) is a Tuvaluan climate activist whose advocacy focuses on the effects of climate change on Tuvalu, particularly sea level rise. She grew up on Fongafale and studied at the University of the South Pacific in Fiji.

Malie attended the 2022 United Nations Climate Change Conference (COP27) and 2023 United Nations Climate Change Conference (COP28) climate conferences as a youth delegate for the Rising Nations Initiative, which seeks to preserve the statehood and heritage of Pacific atoll countries. She was the central figure in the Channel 4 News film Tuvalu: Losing Paradise (2023), which won the Environmental Reporting Award at the One World Media Awards. In September 2024 she addressed a United Nations General Assembly high-level meeting on sea level rise, and in December 2024 counsel for Tuvalu quoted her at the International Court of Justice during hearings on states' climate change obligations. She has also campaigned with Make Rich Polluters Pay, an Oxfam-backed campaign, including at the COP30 conference in Brazil.

== Early life and education ==
Grace Malie was born c. 1999. (Note: Sources gave her age as 24 in December 2023 and as 26 in November 2025.) She grew up on Fongafale, an islet of Funafuti in Tuvalu. Malie has said that she learned about climate change at the age of eight, when her parents explained why the space available for playgrounds was shrinking. She has also said that she first spoke about the subject that year, at an open-air climate event. In a 2024 interview she recalled her grandmother's garden flourishing during her childhood; saltwater had since left the island's soil infertile.

For high school, Malie moved to Vaitupu, where she attended Motufoua Secondary School. She later studied at the University of the South Pacific in Fiji, where she pursued a Bachelor of Commerce degree. She has said that she and other Tuvaluan students in Fiji were mocked as the "sinking island kids". She afterwards returned to Fongafale and worked for a short time as an assistant to Simon Kofe, then Tuvalu's foreign minister.

== Activism ==
=== Rising Nations Initiative and international advocacy ===
The Rising Nations Initiative was launched in September 2022 by Tuvalu and the Marshall Islands. The initiative seeks to preserve the statehood, sovereignty and heritage of Pacific atoll countries and to protect the rights of their people. It also calls for a global agreement that would guarantee these countries' continued existence as states if their islands become uninhabitable. Malie attended the 2022 United Nations Climate Change Conference (COP27) and 2023 United Nations Climate Change Conference (COP28) as a Rising Nations Youth Delegate. At COP28 she called for action rather than discussions, and spoke to Charles III at a meeting hosted by the Commonwealth Secretariat and the UK Foreign, Commonwealth and Development Office.

Tuvalu: Losing Paradise, a Channel 4 News film centred on Malie, premiered at COP28 on 3 December 2023. The 20-minute film follows the work of the Rising Nations Initiative as it seeks an agreement guaranteeing Tuvalu's sovereignty if its people have to resettle elsewhere. ITN said that such an agreement was the first of its kind and could become a model for responding to wider climate-driven displacement. The film won the Environmental Reporting Award at the 2024 One World Media Awards, with Malie among those credited. It was also nominated in the Environment and Science category of the 2024 Foreign Press Association Media Awards.

In September 2024, Malie was among the people who spoke with Ajay Banga, the president of the World Bank, during his visit to Tuvalu. Later that month, she spoke at a United Nations General Assembly meeting on sea level rise, joining a panel on livelihoods, socioeconomic challenges, culture and heritage as a Pacific Youth Fellow. Channel 4 News, which accompanied her to New York, described her as being known as "Tuvalu's Greta Thunberg" and the "real-life Moana". She told the meeting that Tuvalu had done little to cause the climate crisis but was paying a high price for it.

At the Climate Mobility Summit, held alongside the UN meeting, Malie told Agence France-Presse (AFP) about water rationing during a drought two years earlier; rising seas had contaminated the islands' wells, leaving residents reliant on rainwater. A NASA release on projected sea level rise in the Pacific quoted her saying that such data could support early warning systems in Tuvalu.

Malie was interviewed on TEDxLondon's Climate Curious podcast in January 2024. She also appeared in the documentary project Rising Up (2025), made in partnership with Take 3 for the Sea.

=== International Court of Justice ===
In March 2023, the United Nations General Assembly asked the International Court of Justice (ICJ) for an advisory opinion on states' obligations in respect of climate change, at the initiative of Vanuatu. At the court's hearings on 12 December 2024, Phillipa Webb, representing Tuvalu, quoted Malie as saying, "Tuvalu will not go quietly into the rising sea". Speaking at COP29 in Baku, Malie said the opinion would set a "baseline that cannot be ignored", particularly for young people in countries affected by climate change.

=== Cultural heritage ===
Malie was helping to record oral histories for an online cultural archive in 2023, as part of a push for UNESCO protection of Tuvalu's heritage. In June 2025, Malie participated in UNESCO's second Conference on Cultural Heritage in the 21st Century in Naples, where she discussed the preservation of Tuvaluan heritage in the face of climate change. In an interview published in UNESCO's World Heritage magazine, she described working with friends to learn from elders and preserve cultural knowledge in digital repositories. She also emphasised the role of Tuvaluan communities abroad in passing on their language, customs and traditions.

=== Later advocacy ===
Malie has campaigned with Make Rich Polluters Pay, a campaign backed by Oxfam that calls on governments to tax those it holds most responsible for carbon emissions. She took part in COP30 in Belém with the campaign, and was among the activists who handed a petition with more than a million signatures to Brazil's environment minister Marina Silva. She also joined the People's March for Climate in Belém. Writing for Oxfam, Malie has argued that the countries emitting the most should contribute more to loss and damage finance. She reported on Tuvalu and the COP Talks for Channel 4 News in November 2025.

In April 2026, Malie spoke at an Oxfam Australia event run alongside the Women Deliver conference in Melbourne. UNICEF Pacific lists her as a member of the youth steering committee for the Australia–Pacific Youth Climate Dialogue held in connection with the pre-COP31 talks. During those talks in October 2026, Malie said that climate action for Tuvalu was about whether its people could continue to live on their islands.

=== Views ===
Malie has said that she is driven to activism by a wish to live the rest of her life in Tuvalu and to preserve its culture, traditions and environment for the next generation. She has also said that she wants support for Tuvalu to adapt for as long as it can. She told the Associated Press in 2024 that she would choose to stay if she had no children, but that relocation would be an option if she did. She told AFP that several families she knew had moved to New Zealand and Australia, while others still regarded leaving as taboo.

Malie has commended Australia's leaders for establishing a "plan B" through the Falepili Union, a treaty that provides 280 Australian visas a year for Tuvaluans as well as funding for climate adaptation and development. She told SBS News, however, that it was "not a solution to our problem".

In 2025, Malie told The Guardian that while reports from the Intergovernmental Panel on Climate Change warned of rising seas and a clear threat to the submersion of Tuvalu, other research she described as "uncertain" suggested that Tuvalu might not be submerged. The Guardian linked this view to the work of geomorphologist Paul Kench, who accepts that human-caused sea level rise is occurring but has found that Tuvalu's total land area slightly increased over four decades.
