= Hugh Collins =

Hugh Collins, FBA (born 21 June 1953) is Cassel Professor of Commercial Law at the London School of Economics and Political Science, and emeritus Vinerian Professor of English Law at All Souls College, having retained the emeritus title after Timothy Endicott took up the professorship on 1 July 2020.

Previously, Collins was the Professor of English Law at the London School of Economics. He was until 2013 the general editor for the Modern Law Review, the most widely read British academic law journal. Collins was educated at Pembroke College, Oxford (later teaching at Brasenose College) and Harvard Law School before joining the LSE in 1991.

Having a background in commercial law and contract law, Collins' most recent work has been focused on employment law and the possibility of regulating contracts for competitiveness and efficiency.

The LSE Law Department was rated first in the Research Assessment Exercise of 2008 while under Professor Collins' leadership.

In 2009–10 he was based in New York as Global Visiting Professor of Law at NYU.

== Publications ==
- European Civil Code: The Way Forward (2008)
- (with Keith Ewing and Aileen McColgan) Labour Law, Text, Cases and Materials (2005) Hart Publishing ISBN 1-84113-362-0
- Employment Law (2003) Clarendon
- Contract law: Law in Context (2003) Butterworths
- Regulating Contracts (1999) Oxford University Press
- Justice in Dismissal (1992) Oxford University Press
- Marxism and Law (1982) Oxford University Press

== Notes ==
- COLLINS, Prof. Hugh Graham, Who's Who 2015, A & C Black, 2015; online edn, Oxford University Press, 2014
