= Chitty on Contracts =

English contract law textbook

- Author: Professor Hugh Beale
- Language: English
- Release number: 36
- Subject: Contract
- Genre: Law
- Publisher: Sweet & Maxwell
- Publication date: 31 October 2021
- ISBN: 9780414098251
- Website: sweetandmaxwell.co.uk

Chitty on Contracts is one of the leading textbooks covering English contract law. The textbook is now in its 36th edition. The first editors were Joseph Chitty the Younger and Thompson Chitty, sons of Joseph Chitty.

== Contents ==
=== Volume I – General Principles ===
- Part I – Introduction
- Part 2 – Formation of Contract
  - Chapter 2 – The Agreement, Chapter 3 – Consideration, Chapter 4 – Form, Chapter 5 – Mistake, Chapter 6 – Misrepresentation, Chapter 7 – Duress and Undue Influence
- Part 3 – Capacity of Parties
  - Chapter 8 – Personal Incapacity, Chapter 9 – Corporations and Unincorporated Associations, Chapter 10 – The Crown, Public Authorities and the European Union, Chapter 11 – Political Immunity and Incapacity
- Part 4 – The Terms of Contract
  - Chapter 12 – Express Terms, Chapter 13 – Implied Terms, Chapter 14 – Exemption Clauses, Chapter 15 – Unfair Terms in Consumer Contracts
- Part 5 – Illegality and Public Policy:
  - Chapter 16 – Illegality and Public Policy
- Part 6 – Joint Obligations, Third Parties, and Assignment
  - Chapter 17 – Joint Obligations, Chapter 18 – Third Parties, Chapter 19 – Assignment, Chapter 20 – Death and Bankruptcy
- Part 7 – Performance and Discharge
  - Chapter 21 – Performance, Chapter 22 – Discharge By Agreement, Chapter 23 – Discharge By Frustration, Chapter 24 – Discharge By Breach, Chapter 25 – Other Modes of Discharge
- Part 8 – Remedies for Breach of Contract
  - Chapter 26 – Damages, Chapter 27 – Specific Performance and Injunction, Chapter 28 – Limitation of Actions
- Part 9 – Restitution
- Part 10 – Conflict of Laws

=== Volume II – Specific Contracts ===
- Chapter 31 – Agency
- Chapter 32 – Arbitration
- Chapter 33 – Bailment
- Chapter 34 – Bills of Exchange and Banking
- Chapter 35 – Carriage By Air
- Chapter 36 – Carriage By Land
- Chapter 37 – Construction Contracts
- Chapter 38 – Credit and Security
- Chapter 39 – Employment
- Chapter 40 – Gambling Contracts
- Chapter 41 – Insurance
- Chapter 42 – Restrictive Agreements and Competition
- Chapter 43 – Sale of Goods
- Chapter 44 – Suretyship

== Editions ==
Edition	Main editor	Date
A Treatise on the law of contracts
1	Joseph Chitty	1826
2	Joseph Chitty	1834
3	Thompson Chitty	1841
4	John Archibald Russell	1851
5	John Archibald Russell	1853
6	John Archibald Russell	1857
7	John Archibald Russell	1863
8	John Archibald Russell	1868
9	John Archibald Russell	1871
10	John Archibald Russell	1876
11	John Archibald Russell	1881
12	John Mountency Lely	1890
13	John Mountency Lely	1896
14	John Mountency Lely	1904
15	Wyatt Wyatt-Paine (1855-1935)	1909
16	Wyatt Wyatt-Paine	1912
17	Wyatt Wyatt-Paine	1921
18	W. A. Macfarlane	1930
19	Harold Potter	1937
20	Harold Potter	1947
Chitty on Contracts
21	Kenneth Scott	1955
22	John Morris	1961
23	Anthony Gordon Guest	1968
24	Anthony Gordon Guest	1977
25	Anthony Gordon Guest	1983
26	Anthony Gordon Guest	1989
27	Anthony Gordon Guest	1994
28	Hugh Beale	1999
29	Hugh Beale	2004
30	Hugh Beale	2008
31	Hugh Beale	2012
32	Hugh Beale	2015
33	Hugh Beale	2017
34	Hugh Beale	31 October 2021
35	Hugh Beale	30 November 2023

== See also ==
- English contract law
