= John Phillips (lawyer) =

English law professor

John C. Phillips is a Professor of Law at King's College London School of Law. He was the Head of the School of Law from 2002 to 2005.

== Biography ==
Phillips is a commercial lawyer, specialising in intellectual property and the law of guarantee. He graduated from Cambridge University, and practised as a barrister. He was the University of Western Australia Faculty of Law Dean from 1993 to 1996. He moved to King's College, London and became the Head of the School of Law from 2002 to 2005.

== Publications ==
Articles

- 'The Human Rights Act and business: Friend or foe?' (2012) 4 Lloyds Maritime and Commercial Law Quarterly 487 (with Conor Gearty)
- 'Protecting Those in a Disadvantageous Negotiating Position: Unconscionable Bargains as a Unifying Doctrine' (2010) 45(3) Wake Forest Law Review 837
- "Smith v Hughes (1871)" in C Mitchell and P Mitchell (eds) Landmark Cases in the Law of Contract (2008) 205
- The Contractual Nexus: is reliance essential? (2002) Vol 22 (i) OJLS 115-134

Books

- The Modern Contract of Guarantee (Sweet & Maxwell 2003)
