= Phillipa Webb =

Australian-born lawyer

Philippa Webb
- Born: 1978 (age 47–48); Sydney
- Education: University of New South Wales et al
- Occupations: Lawyer, academic
- Known for: King's Counsel

Philippa Mahal Webb KC (born 1978) is an Australian-born lawyer, academic and writer. In 2026, she became a King's Counsel. She is Professor of Public International Law at the University of Oxford and co-founder and director of the Oxford Institute of Technology and Justice. She is also a founding Board Member of the Clooney Foundation for Justice. She has collaborated with Amal Clooney on a book about the right to a fair trial.

== Life ==
Webb was born in Sydney in 1978. She studied Law and Asian Studies at the University of New South Wales, where she achieved a first class degree and university medals. In 2001, she worked for the United Nations in New York.

Between 2006 and 2009, Webb worked as a Special Assistant and Legal Officer to Judge Rosalyn Higgins GBE QC during her presidency of the International Court of Justice. In 2012, she became a Professor of Public International Law at the Dickson Poon School of Law, King’s College London.

Webb later accepted a position as Professor of Public International Law at the University of Oxford.

In 2021, Webb and Amal Clooney published The Right to a Fair Trial in International Law.

In 2024, Webb represented the country of Tuvalu before the International Court of Justice in an advisory opinion case regarding the obligation of states to address climate change. The case was brought at the instigation of the United Nations General Assembly. Webb notably quoted Grace Malie saying "Tuvalu will not go quietly into the rising sea" and said that the 11,000 inhabitants of Tuvalu would continue to have rights even if the sea consumed their lands.

In August 2025, Webb and Lydia Kim co-authored a paper analysing the future of international law amid instances of state non-compliance. The publication proposed six viewpoints evaluating alternative frameworks for the international legal system.

Webb is a founding Board Member of the Clooney Foundation for Justice. She is also co-founder and director of the Oxford Institute of Technology and Justice at the Blavatnik School of Government, University of Oxford. The Institute focuses on the intersection of technology and justice, including the use of artificial intelligence to expand access to justice.

In 2026, the Oxford Institute of Technology and Justice utilised Webb and Amal Clooney's 2021 book to develop an AI legal chatbot. Developed alongside the University of Oxford’s Blavatnik School of Government and Malawi's Women Lawyers Association, the software compiles legal remedies and protection orders in local Malawian languages.
