= Amal Clooney =

Lebanese, British, and French barrister (born 1978)

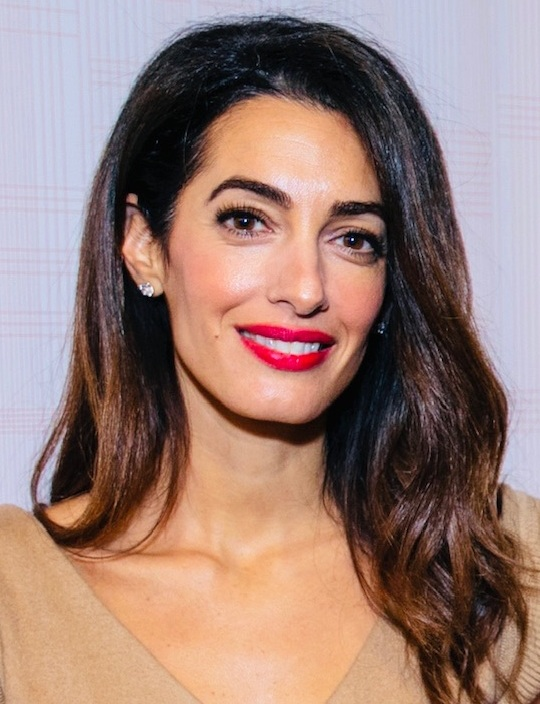
- Clooney in 2022
- Born: Amal Alamuddin; 3 February 1978 (age 48); Beirut, Lebanon
- Citizenship: United Kingdom; Lebanon; France
- Education: University of Oxford (BA); New York University (LLM)
- Occupation: Barrister
- Years active: 2000–present
- Spouse: George Clooney (m. 2014)
- Children: 2

Amal Clooney (née Alamuddin; born 3 February 1978) is a Lebanese and British international human rights lawyer. She has represented several high-profile clients, including former Maldivian president Mohamed Nasheed, WikiLeaks founder Julian Assange, former Ukrainian prime minister Yulia Tymoshenko, Yazidi human rights activist Nadia Murad, Filipino-American journalist Maria Ressa, Azerbaijani journalist Khadija Ismayilova, and Egyptian-Canadian journalist Mohamed Fahmy.

Clooney is professor of Practice in International Law at the Blavatnik School of Government at the University of Oxford and a senior fellow at the Oxford Institute of Technology and Justice, an institute she co-founded to harness the power of AI to increase access to justice.

== Early life and education ==
Amal Alamuddin was born in Beirut, Lebanon, on 3 February 1978. Her father is Lebanese Druze and her mother is Lebanese Sunni Muslim from Tripoli. When she was two years old, her family moved to the United Kingdom to escape the Lebanese Civil War, settling in Gerrards Cross in Buckinghamshire. She has three siblings: one sister (Tala Alamuddin) and two half-brothers from her father's first marriage..

Her father, Ramzi Alamuddin, received his MBA degree at the American University of Beirut and returned to Lebanon in 1991, one year after the Lebanese Civil War ended. Her mother Baria (née Miknass), is from Tripoli in the North Governorate. She was a political journalist and foreign editor of the London-based newspaper al-Hayat, which is owned by Saudi Arabian prince Khalid bin Sultan Al Saud. She is also related to the late Ziad Takieddine, a Lebanese-French businessman and arms broker, who was her father's first cousin.

Clooney attended Dr Challoner's High School, a girls' grammar school in Little Chalfont, Buckinghamshire. She then studied at St Hugh's College, Oxford, where she received an exhibition grant and the Shrigley Award. In 2000, she graduated with an upper second-class degree in Jurisprudence and is an honorary fellow of St Hugh's.

She enrolled at the New York University School of Law to study for an LLM degree. She received the Jack J. Katz Memorial Award for excellence in entertainment law. While at the university, she worked for one semester in the office of American lawyer and jurist Sonia Sotomayor, who was then a judge for the United States Court of Appeals for the Second Circuit and an NYU Law faculty member.

== Legal career ==
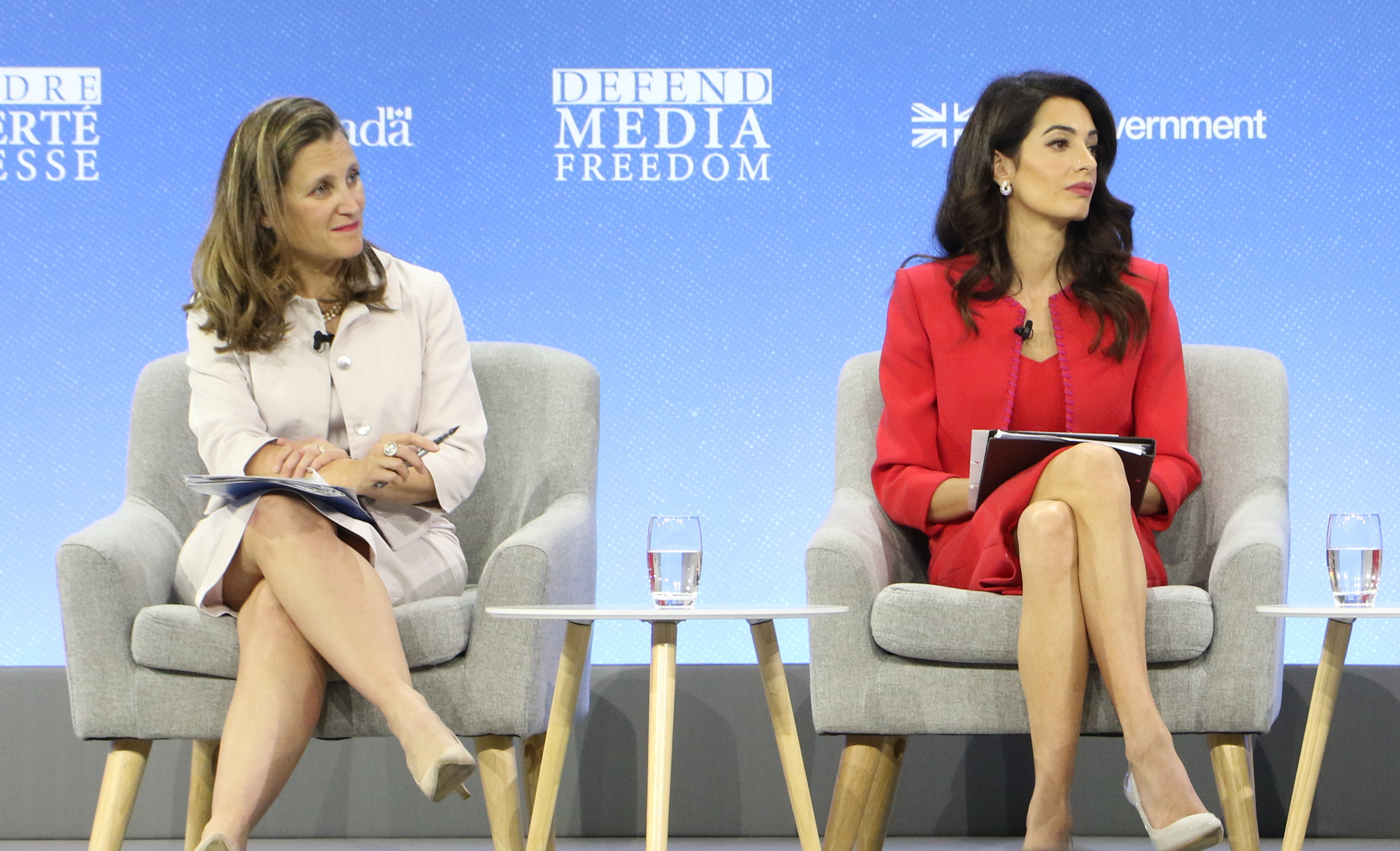
Clooney (right) with Canadian foreign minister Chrystia Freeland at the Global Conference for Media Freedom in London, 2019

Clooney is qualified to practice law in New York and England and Wales. She was admitted to the New York Bar in 2002. In 2010, Clooney was called to the Bar of England and Wales, Inner Temple. She is a practising barrister at Doughty Street Chambers. She has also practised at the International Court of Justice and the International Criminal Court in The Hague. She worked at Sullivan & Cromwell in New York City for three years as part of the Criminal Defense and Investigations Group, where her clients included Enron and Arthur Andersen. In 2024, Clooney was the recipient of a Legal 500 lawyer of the year award in recognition of her outstanding work and contributions in the field of international law.

Clooney completed a judicial clerkship at the International Court of Justice in 2004, serving under judges Vladlen S. Vereshchetin from Russia, Nabil Elaraby from Egypt, and ad hoc judge Franklin Berman from the United Kingdom. She was subsequently based in The Hague working at the International Criminal Tribunal for the former Yugoslavia, where she was judicial assistant to Patrick Robinson, presiding judge. The case charged Slobodan Milosevic, the former president of the former Republic of Yugoslavia, with crimes allegedly committed in Kosovo, Croatia, and Bosnia during the war in the former Yugoslavia. Clooney also worked as a prosecutor at The Special Tribunal for Lebanon. She prosecuted the case against five members of Hezbollah, accused of assassinating former Lebanese Prime Minister Hariri and others in 2005.

Clooney's practice focuses on human rights. She regularly represents journalists and was appointed in 2019 as the inaugural deputy chair of the High Level Panel of Legal Experts on Media Freedom by Lord Neuberger. In March 2018, Clooney joined the international legal team that represented the Burmese Reuters journalists, Wa Lone and Kyaw Soe Oo, who were sentenced to seven years in prison in Myanmar for reporting on the murders of ten Rohingya men by Buddhist villagers and Myanmar paramilitary police in the village of Inn Din in September 2017. They were released in May 2019. In July 2019, she and Irish barrister Caoilfhionn Gallagher became the leaders of the international legal team that represented Filipino-American journalist Maria Ressa. Ressa faces legal charges that could lead to decades in prison.

In January 2015, Clooney became a member of a legal team representing Armenia on an appeal before the European Court of Human Rights against Turkish politician Doğu Perinçek who was convicted of denying the Armenian genocide. In November 2021, Clooney was co-plaintiff's and victims' counsel in the first case in which an Islamic State member, Taha al-Jumailly, was convicted of genocide and crimes against humanity. Al-Jumailly was sentenced to life in prison. Clooney was also co-plaintiff's counsel in the case against Al-Jumailly's ex-wife, German-born Islamic State member Jennifer Wenisch, for her role in crimes against humanity, war crimes and membership in a foreign terrorist organization. She was sentenced to 14 years in prison.

Clooney represented 126 victims of the genocide in Darfur, Sudan, in a case at the International Criminal Court against Ali Muhammad Ali Abd-Al-Rahman, who was a senior leader of the pro-government janjaweed fighters. This is the only trial that has, as of October 2025, resulted in a conviction for crimes against humanity in Darfur.

In December 2023, Clooney filed a civil case on behalf of over 800 Yazidi-American plaintiffs against French cement manufacturer Lafarge for conspiring to provide material support to the Islamic State group. The lawsuit seeks to hold Lafarge accountable for its admitted criminal conspiracy with ISIS and obtain compensation for the Yazidi people. Clooney's long time client Nadia Murad is the lead plaintiff in the case. Clooney provided a statement on Sexual Violence in Conflict during the 8514th Meeting of the United Nations Security Council on Women, Peace and Security.

Following the Russian invasion of Ukraine in 2022, Clooney and other prominent international human rights lawyers led a legal task force created at the request of the government of Ukraine to provide legal advice on the potential avenues to secure criminal accountability for Russia in national jurisdictions, the ICC, and the United Nations. She was also appointed to a group of international legal experts by president of Ukraine Volodymyr Zelenskyy to advise on legal mechanisms for survivors of the conflict to claim compensation. On April 27, 2022, Clooney delivered remarks at a UN Security Council Arria-Formula Meeting on Ensuring Accountability for Atrocities Committed by Russia in Ukraine.

In May 2024, it was announced that Clooney had served on an advisory panel that reviewed the prosecutor of the International Criminal Court's investigation into potential war crimes committed in the Gaza war. The panel was convened by the ICC in January 2024 at the request of ICC prosecutor Karim Ahmad Khan. She and five other legal experts unanimously recommended that an application be made for arrest warrants against five people: Israeli prime minister Benjamin Netanyahu, Hamas leader in the Gaza Strip Yahya Sinwar, two other Hamas leaders and Israeli minister of defence Yoav Gallant. In her statement, Clooney said there were "reasonable grounds to believe" that all five committed war crimes and crimes against humanity. On 20 May 2024, Financial Times published an op-ed article written by Clooney and the other panel experts.

In 2025, Clooney was appointed professor of practice at Oxford University's Blavatnik School of Government. In October 2025, Clooney co-founded the Oxford Institute of Technology and Justice, a collaboration between Oxford University and the Clooney Foundation for Justice to harness AI and new technologies to increase access to justice.

From 2015 to 2025, Clooney was a visiting faculty member as well as a senior fellow at Columbia Law School's Human Rights Institute, where she co-taught the Human Rights Course with professor Sarah Cleveland. Clooney has also lectured students on international criminal law at the SOAS School of Law in London, the New School in New York City, the Hague Academy of International Law, and the University of North Carolina at Chapel Hill.

=== Appointments ===
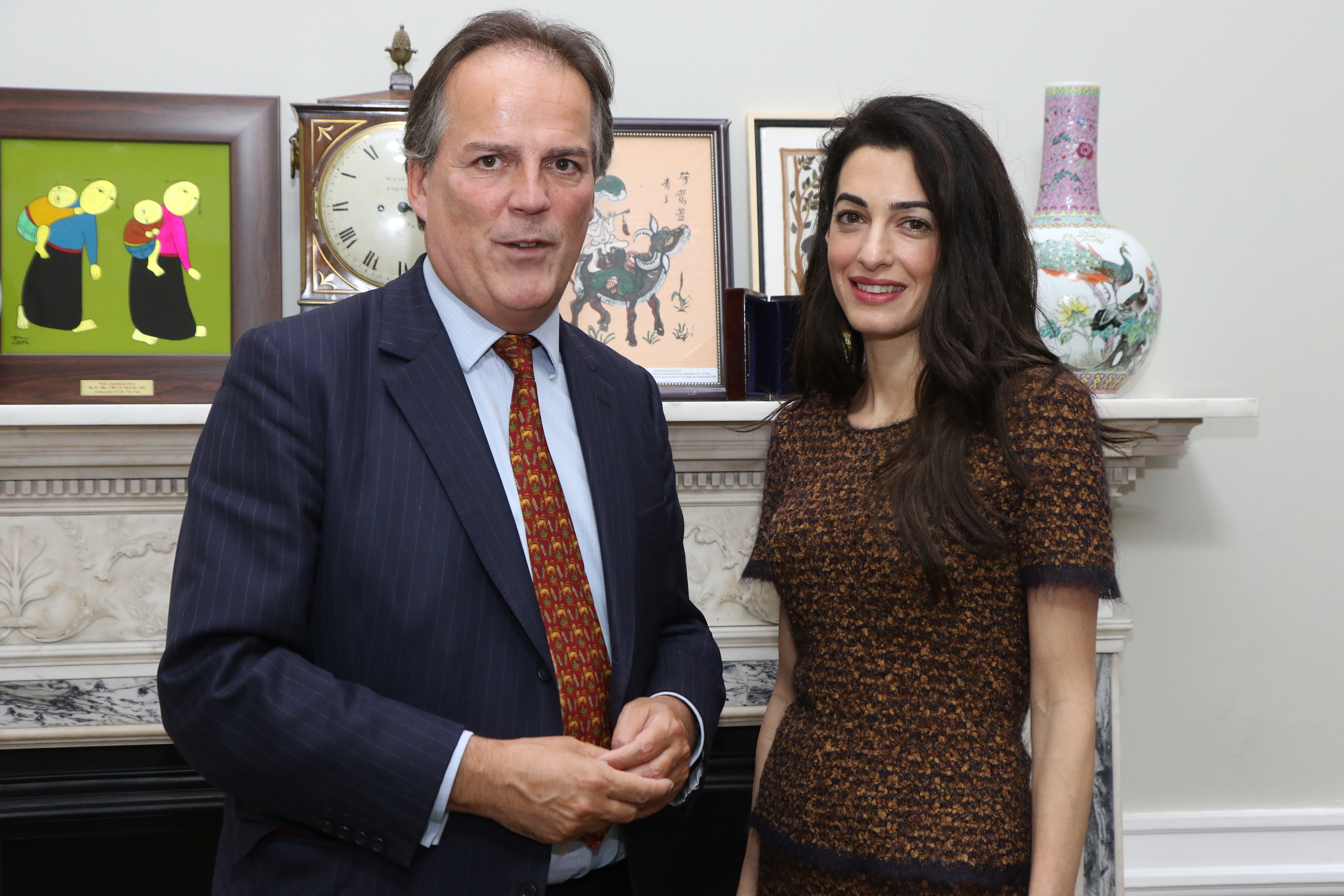
Clooney with British foreign minister Mark Field in London, 2018

- Senior fellow, Oxford Institute of Technology and Justice.
- Appointed to the UK Attorney General's Office Public International Law Panel (Panel C from 2014 to 2019 and Panel B from 2020 and Panel A from 2026), a panel of experts on international law which is called upon to advise and represent the UK in domestic and international courts.
- Honorary fellow of St Hugh’s College, Oxford.
- Appointed to the United Kingdom’s Team of Experts on preventing sexual violence in conflict zones (PSVI).
- Appointed as UK special envoy on media freedom (2019–2020) by the UK foreign secretary (2019–2020).
- Appointed as deputy chair of the High Level Panel of Legal Experts on Media Freedom (2019–2021) by Lord Neuberger, former president of the UK Supreme Court.
- Appointed as special adviser to the International Criminal Court prosecutor, Karim Khan KC.
- In 2013 she was appointed to a number of United Nations commissions, including as adviser to special envoy Kofi Annan on Syria and as counsel to the 2013 Drone Inquiry by UN human rights rapporteur Ben Emmerson KC into the use of drones in counter-terrorism operations.
- Appointed to the Human Dignity Trust Bar Panel, a small panel of barristers who act pro bono and provide advice on cases challenging discrimination against the LGBT community.

== Clooney Foundation for Justice ==
In 2016, Clooney co-founded the Clooney Foundation for Justice (CFJ) with her husband, George Clooney. The Foundation provides free legal aid in defence of free speech and women’s rights in over 40 countries. CFJ focuses on two initiatives: TrialWatch, which provides free legal aid to journalists who are unfairly imprisoned to secure their release and uphold freedom of speech; and Waging Justice for Women, provides free legal aid to women and girls to defend their rights, including their right to be free from discrimination, child marriage, and violence. Its work has led to dozens of journalists being set free and thousands of women receiving free legal support to defend their rights, including their rights to freedom from abuse, economic discrimination and child marriage. In 2022, the Foundation partnered with the Obama Foundation’s Girls Opportunity Alliance and Melinda French Gates to advance gender equality and reduce levels of child marriage worldwide. The Foundation also provides a fellowship program to help young women lawyers across Africa launch careers in human rights.

Professor of Clinical Law Margaret Satterthwaite, who was the UN special rapporteur on the independence of judges and lawyers, said in 2024, that the CFJ is doing “crucial work...to make sure brave justice advocates can continue to advance human rights despite threats, criminalization, and harassment.”

In 2026, Clooney reported on the foundation's work to use AI to address the gap between the supply of qualified lawyers and the need for justice with the Women Lawyers Association (WLA) in Malawi. Clooney said that 10% of girls under fifteen are forced into marriage in Malawi, but there were only 800 lawyers to serve Malawi's population of 22 million. Her Clooney Foundation for Justice was working with the WLA and the University of Oxford’s Blavatnik School of Government to create an AI chatbot that can advise on the closest lawyer and draft common legal remedies including protection orders. It can also assist survivors to create compliant protection order requests.

The foundation's board in 2026 was chaired by George and Amal Clooney and its directors are Phillipa Webb, Zanny Minton Beddoes of the Economist and Microsoft vice chair Brad Smith.

== Philanthropy ==
She partnered with the Aurora Humanitarian Initiative in beginning the Amal Clooney Scholarship, which was created to send one female student from Lebanon to the United World College Dilijan each year, to enroll in a two-year International Baccalaureate (IB) programme.

Clooney and her husband sponsored a Yazidi student, Hazim Avdal, whom she met via her work with Nadia Murad as Avdal worked at Yazda. Avdal was attending the University of Chicago.

In 2017, the Clooneys awarded a $1 million grant to the Southern Poverty Law Center in Charlottesville, Virginia, to combat hate groups in America.

In 2018, following the Stoneman Douglas High School shooting, the Clooneys pledged $500,000 to the March for Our Lives and said they would be in attendance. They also donated $100,000 to the Young Center for Immigrant Children's Rights, through the Clooney Foundation for Justice, to help migrant children who were separated from their families at the Mexico–United States border.

Amal and George Clooney donated $100,000 to three Lebanese charities, the Lebanese Red Cross, Impact Lebanon, and Baytna Baytak, who helped provide aid to those affected by the 2020 explosion in Beirut.

In 2020, the Clooneys donated $1 million to coronavirus relief efforts. This included money for the NHS to help provide assistance to frontline workers and to The Lebanese Food Bank which helps single mothers, the elderly and vulnerable people who could not work due to the COVID-19 pandemic. The couple also made a donation to The Mill at Sonning Theatre, located close to their Berkshire home, which helped ensure its survival through the pandemic.

In 2022, Clooney, along with Michelle Obama and Melinda French Gates, launched the 'Get Her There' campaign that seeks to catalyse educating and empowering teenage females.

== Personal life ==
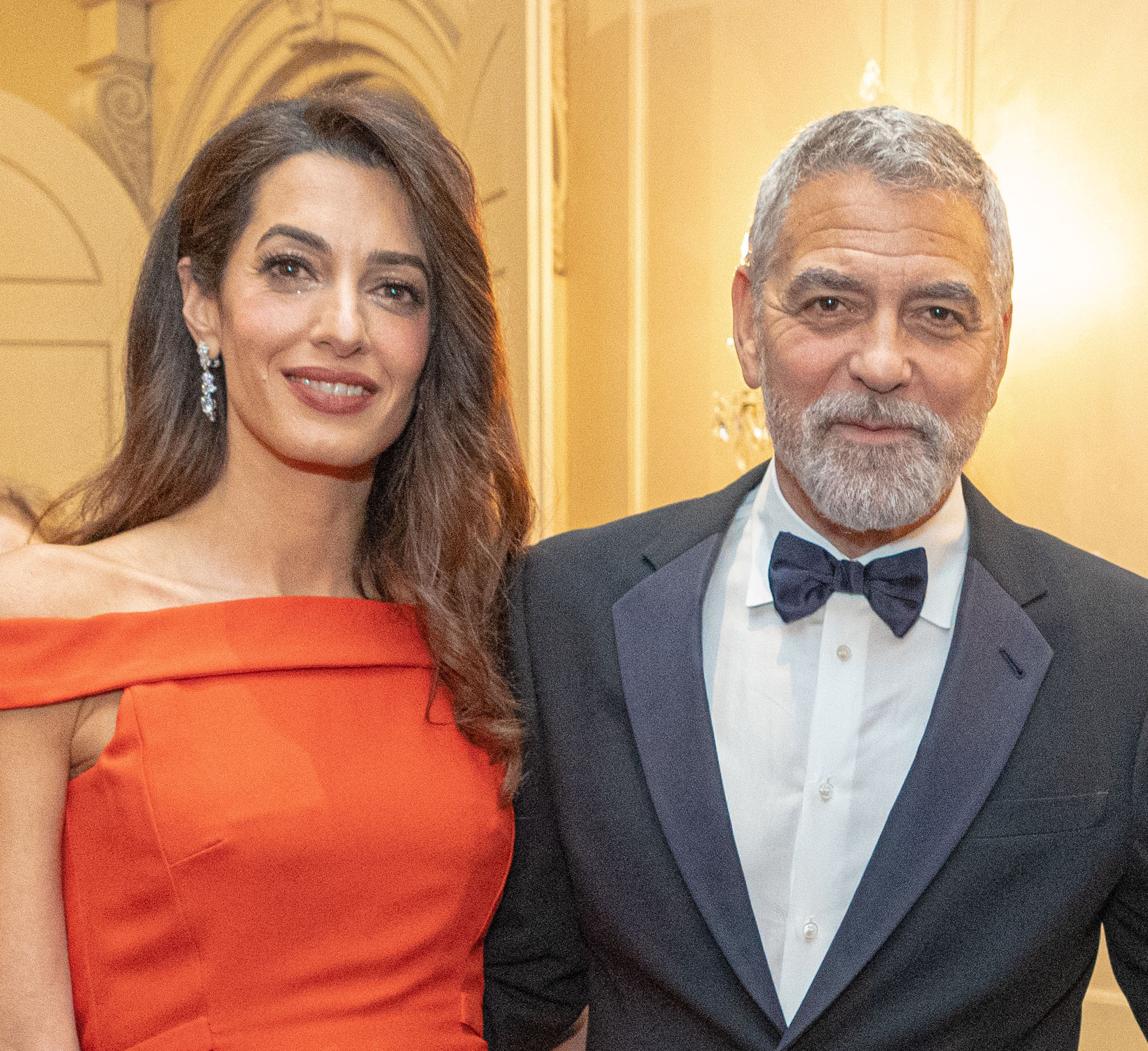
Clooney with her husband George Clooney in 2022.

Clooney is a citizen of the UK, Lebanon, and France. She is fluent in English and French and is conversational in Arabic.

On 28 April 2014, she became engaged to American actor George Clooney, whom she had first met through a mutual friend in July 2013. On 7 August 2014, the couple obtained marriage licences in the Royal Borough of Kensington and Chelsea in London. Two days after their high-profile wedding ceremony, the duo married on 27 September 2014 at Ca' Farsetti in the city of Venice; they were married by Clooney's friend Walter Veltroni, an Italian politician who served as the country's deputy prime minister between 1996 and 1998 and as the mayor of Rome between 2001 and 2008. In October 2014, it was announced that the Clooneys had bought the Mill House on an island of the River Thames at Sonning Eye at a cost of around £10 million.

In February 2017, it was reported by the American television talk show The Talk that Clooney was pregnant. American actor Matt Damon, a friend of the family, confirmed the pregnancy on the American television series Entertainment Tonight shortly thereafter. In June 2017, Clooney gave birth to fraternal twins: a girl and a boy. Connie Simpson served as nanny.

== Published works ==
=== Books ===
- Special Tribunal for Lebanon: Law and Practice, co-edited with D. Tolbert and N. Jurdi (Oxford University Press, 2014).
- Clooney, Amal; Webb, Philippa (2020). The Right to a Fair Trial in International Law. New York: Oxford University Press. ISBN 978-0-198-80839-8. OCLC 994411014. The book was awarded the top prize in academic book publishing, the American Society of International Law Certificate of Merit for High Technical Craftsmanship and Utility to Practicing Lawyers and Scholars, and has been cited by the UK Supreme Court. Clooney and Webb discussed the book at St. Hugh's College in a panel titled Waging Justice in an Age of Authoritarianism.
- Co-editor with D. Neuberger of Freedom of Speech in International Law (2024)

=== Book chapters and journal articles ===
- "Human Rights", chapter in I. Roberts (ed.), Satow's Diplomatic Practice (8th Edition, Oxford University Press, 2023).
- "The Right to Insult in International Law?", with P. Webb, in Columbia Human Rights Law Review, 2017, Vol. 48, No. 2.
- Alamuddin, Amal; Bonini, Anna (2014). "Chapter 4: The UN investigation of the Hariri assassination: The relationship between the UN investigation commission and the Special Tribunal for Lebanon: Problems of Principle and Practice". In Alamuddin, Amal; Jurdi, Nidal Nabil; Tolbert, David (eds.). The Special Tribunal for Lebanon: Law and Practice. Oxford: Oxford University Press. pp. 50–72. ISBN 978-0-19-968745-9. OCLC 861207456.
- Alamuddin, Amal (2014). "The role of the Security Council in starting and stopping cases at the International Criminal Court: problems of principle and practice". In Zidar, Andraž; Bekou, Olympia (eds.). Contemporary Challenges for the International Criminal Court. London: British Institute of International and Comparative Law. pp. 103–130. ISBN 978-1-90522-151-6. OCLC 871319445.
- Alamuddin, Amal; Hardman, Nadia (February 2014). "Separating Law and Politics: Challenges to the Independence of Judges and Prosecutors in Egypt". Report of the International Bar Association Human Rights Institute (IBAHRI), Supported by the Open Society Foundations Arab Regional Office. Archived from the original on 8 August 2016.
- Alamuddin, Amal; Webb, Philippa (15 November 2010). "Expanding Jurisdiction over War Crimes under Article 8 of the ICC Statute". Journal of International Criminal Justice. 8 (5): 1219–1243. doi:10.1093/jicj/mqq066. ISSN 1478-1387. OCLC 775833494.
- Alamuddin, Amal (2010). "II. Before the Trial Begins; 6. Collection of Evidence". In Khan, Karim A. A.; Buisman, Caroline; Gosnell, Christopher (eds.). Principles of Evidence in International Criminal Justice. Oxford: Oxford University Press. pp. 231–305. ISBN 978-0-19-958892-3. OCLC 663822377.

=== Selected articles and blogs ===
- Clooney, Amal, Fulford Adrian, Meron Theodor, Friedman Danny, Kennedy Helena, Wilmshurst Elizabeth (20 May 2024), "Why we support ICC prosecutions for crimes in Israel and Gaza" Financial Times
- Clooney, Amal and Wolosky, Lee (17 December 2023), "Why We’re Helping Yazidi Americans Get Justice" New York Times
- Clooney, Amal and Skilbeck, Rupert (19 October 2023), "Amal Clooney and Rupert Skilbeck on why Britain fails to hold war criminals to account" Economist
- Clooney, Amal (29 July 2021). "Don't Let the Autocrats Win – How Biden Can Use the Democracy Summit to Build Back Media Freedom". Just Security.
- Clooney, Amal (17 May 2021). "Yazidis Deserve Justice for Genocide: How Biden's Team Can Lead the Way". Just Security.
- Clooney, Amal (11 May 2021). "An ISIS torturer was complicit in genocide. The U.S. is making it hard to bring her to justice". The Washington Post.
- Clooney, Amal (12 June 2020). "A test for democracy in the Philippines". The Washington Post.
- Clooney, Amal (22 September 2017). "Finally, We Have a Coordinated Effort to Bring ISIS to Justice". Huffington Post.
- Clooney, Amal (14 October 2015). "Maldives Backslides Into Repression as the World Calls for President Nasheed's Release". Huffington Post.
- Clooney, Amal (2 August 2015). "It Is Time for Sisi to Set Al Jazeera Journalist Mohamed Fahmy Free". Huffington Post.
- Clooney, Amal (30 April 2015). "Release Mohamed Nasheed – an innocent man and the Maldives' great hope". The Guardian.
- Clooney, Amal (26 February 2015). ""Egypt Should Send Canadian Journalist Mohamed Fahmy Home". Huffington Post.
- Clooney, Amal (18 August 2014). "The Anatomy of an Unfair Trial". Huffington Post.
- Alamuddin, Amal (10 December 2012). "Will Syria go to the ICC?" (PDF). The Lawyer. Archived from the original (PDF) on 3 June 2016.
- Alamuddin, Amal (April 2012). "Does Libya Have to Surrender Saif Al-slam Gaddafi to The Hague?" (PDF). Mizaan: The Newsletter from Lawyers for Justice in Libya (1). Archived from the original (PDF) on 23 September 2015.

== Awards and recognition ==
| Organizations | Year | Award | Result | Ref. |
|---|---|---|---|---|
| ABC News | 2014 | Barbara Walters' Most Fascinating Person | Honored | |
| British Fashion Awards, | 2014 | Best British Style alongside David Beckham, Kate Moss, Keira Knightley and Emma Watson | Shortlisted | |
| World Economic Forum | 2016 | Young Global Leader | Honored | |
| United Nations Correspondents Association | 2018 | Global Citizen of the Year Award | Honored | |
| Charles III | 2019 | The Amal Clooney Award to celebrate "incredible young women" | Honored | |
| The Simon Wiesenthal Center | 2020 | Humanitarian Award | Honored | |
| Committee to Protect Journalists | 2020 | Gwen Ifill Award | Honored | |
| Reporters Committee for Freedom of the Press | 2021 | Freedom of the Press Award | Honored | |
| American Society of International Law | 2021 | Champion of the International Rule of Law Award | Honored | |
| National Underground Railroad Freedom Center | 2021 | International Freedom Conductor Awards Gala Tribute | Honored | |
| Society of Writers to His Majesty's Signet | 2022 | Fellow of the WS Society | Honored | |
| Time Magazine | 2022 | Woman of the Year | Honored | |
| Article 3 Human Rights | 2022 | Global Treasure Award | Honored | |
| Katholieke Universiteit Leuven | 2023 | Doctor Honoris Causa | Honored | |
| BBC | 2023 | 100 Women Inspiring and Influential Women | Honored | |
| Legal 500 | 2024 | Lawyer of the Year Award | Honored | |

== See also ==
- Lebanese people in the United Kingdom
- List of Druze
