= Aoife Nolan =

International human rights law academic

Aoife Nolan is an Irish human rights lawyer who is Professor of International human rights law at the University of Nottingham. She is President of the Council of Europe's European Committee of Social Rights, the leading European monitoring mechanism on economic and social rights, having joined the Committee in 2017 and served as vice-president in 2021-2. She is an academic expert at Doughty Street Chambers where she co-leads the Children's Rights Group and sits on the Steering Group of Doughty Street International. She has led international research projects and acted as an expert advisor to a wide range of international and national organisations and bodies working on human rights issues, including UN entities, the Council of Europe, the World Bank, multiple NHRIs and NGOs, as well as governments. In addition to her academic role at Nottingham, she is currently a visiting professor at the Grantham Research Institute on Climate Change and the Environment, LSE, and at Ulster University. In 2025, she was elected a Fellow of the Royal Society of Arts on the basis of her "world-leading expertise and practice on the rights of children, especially in relation to the socio-economic impacts of poverty and cost of living". In June 2026, she was elected to the United Nations Committee on the Rights of the Child, following nomination for membership by the Government of Ireland.

== Education ==
Nolan studied law at Trinity College Dublin, graduating with a LLB, and undertook her doctorate at the EUI. She completed her PGCHET at Queen's University, Belfast.

== Career ==
From 2010 to 2012, she worked at Durham University, having spent 2006–2010 at Queen's University, Belfast, where her work included leading a ground-breaking project on human rights and budgets.

In 2007-8, Nolan was senior legal officer with the ESC Rights Litigation Programme of the Centre on Housing Rights and Evictions, and human rights adviser to the Working Group on Economic and Social Rights, where she engaged with the Northern Ireland Bill of Rights Forum. In 2008, she advised the International NGO Coalition for an Optional Protocol to the International Covenant on Economic, Social and Cultural Rights (ESCR) in the context of the Optional Protocol negotiations. Nolan served on the Coordinating Committee of the ESCR-Net Case-Law Database, is a Council member of Child Rights International Network (CRIN) and was a founding trustee of Just Fair.

Nolan was Director and Co-Director of the University of Nottingham Human Rights Law Centre from 2019-2026, where she also founded and has led the Economic, Social and Environmental Rights Unit since 2013. She was academic lead of the interdisciplinary Children and Childhood Network and hosted the Nottingham Summer School on Child Rights. During 2015-2018, her work co-leading the UoN Rights and Justice Research Priority Area involved over 700 members from 22 different university centres. In July 2021, she was elected to the University of Nottingham Senate. She was re-elected in 2025.

Nolan has taught at international centres such as Geneva Academy of International Humanitarian Law and Human Rights, the University of Groningen, Harvard, Oslo, Global Campus for Human Rights (Venice). She has held visiting positions at Fordham, Columbia, Washington, Stellenbosch, Cape Town, Queen's University Belfast, the Faculty of Law and Criminology at the Université Catholique de Louvain and Roma Tre University. She has previously been a visiting professorial Fellow at UNSW Law and a Hauser Senior Global Research Fellow at the Center for Human Rights and Global Justice at NYU School of Law.

Nolan founded the Economic and Social Rights Academic Network UK-Ireland (ESRAN-UKI) and was a member of the Coordinating Committee of the Academic Network on the European Social Charter (ANESC-RACSE).

Nolan is an academic expert at Doughty Street Chambers where she co-leads the Children's rights group. She is currently President of the Council of Europe's European Committee of Social Rights, having been a member since 2017 and vice-president in 2021-22.

=== Research ===
Nolan's publications include works on human rights, economic and social rights and children's rights, and constitutional law. Her book on Children's Socio-economic Rights, Democracy and the Courts (2011), won the IALT Kevin Boyle Book Prize and was shortlisted for the Birks Book Prize. She is on the editorial board of the Human Rights Law Review, International Human Rights Law Review and, formerly, the International Journal of Children's Rights.

In 2017, she led an ESRC IAA-funded collaborative project, Making Economic and Social Rights Real, in the University of Nottingham and this created for the Equality and Human Rights Commission of Great Britain, digital resources on economic and social rights, including videos, for use in civil society, or by policymakers, academics and others to inform them on economic and social rights.

In 2018, Nolan was involved in drafting the Abidjan Principles on the Right to Education. In December 2017, she was invited to join the Scottish First Minister's Advisory Group on Human Rights Leadership, set up to make recommendations on how Scotland can 'lead by example' in human rights, including economic, social, cultural and environmental rights. In 2019-20, she served on the Scottish Government's Child Rights Working Group, creating a model which included the United Nations Convention on the Rights of the Child within Scots Law.

She led a major international study on the theory and practice of children's rights strategic litigation, the Advancing Child Rights Strategic Litigation (ACRiSL) project. This research collaboration, involving partners from across Africa, Asia and Europe, developed a ground-breaking model of child rights consistent strategic litigation, which has been widely applied internationally, including by the Commission for Children and Young People in Scotland and the Children's Commissioner for Jersey.

She served on the Steering Group of the British Academy's Childhood Policy Programme from 2020 to 2022. In 2021 she was elected to the executive committee of the Association of Human Rights Institutes (AHRI).

Nolan was shortlisted at the 2021 Inspirational Women in Law Awards for 'Legal Academic of the Year'.

Nolan's research has been cited by human rights entities such as OHCHR, the Council of Europe Commissioner for Human Rights, the UN Special Rapporteur on extreme poverty and human rights, the UN Special Rapporteur on the human rights to safe drinking water and sanitation, the UN Independent Expert on the effects of foreign debt on human rights, the UN Special Rapporteur on the right to adequate housing, and the UN Special Rapporteur on the right to health. And she is an advisor to United Nations groups on UN Special Procedures, UN Committee on the Rights of the Child, UN Committee on Economic, Social and Cultural Rights. In 2022-23, she served on the advisory committee for UNCRC's General Comment No.26 on children's rights and the environment. UNCESRC asked Nolan to assist to incorporate children's rights and children's participation (and create a child-friendly version) of the General Comment on sustainable development and the International Covenant on Economic, Social and Cultural Rights. She has written on the impact of school closures on human rights, and the 2023 'cost of living crisis' on human rights.

== Personal life ==
In 2015, Nolan married Conor Gearty (also a human rights lawyer) who died on 11 September 2025.

== Selected publications ==
- Children's Socio-economic Rights, Democracy and the Courts (2011)
- Human Rights and Public Finance - Budgets and the Promotion of Economic and Social Rights (2013)
- Economic and Social Rights After the Global Financial Crisis (2014)
- Children's Rights Strategic Litigation Toolkit (2022)
