= Aileen McColgan =

British barrister and academic

Aileen McColgan, KC is a British barrister and academic. She was Professor of Human Rights Law at King's College London between 2001 and 2018 and is now Professor of Law and Social Justice at the University of Leeds. She is an expert in labour law, discrimination and human rights. She works as a practising barrister at 11 KBW (previously Matrix Chambers). McColgan was selected to become Queen’s Counsel in the 2019 competition and was sworn in in 2020.

McColgan is originally from Derry, Northern Ireland. She holds degrees from Trinity College, Cambridge and Edinburgh University.

== Publications ==
Articles

- 'Class wars?: religion and (in)equality in the workplace’ (2009) 38 Industrial Law Journal 1-29
- ‘Reconfiguring Discrimination Law’ [2007] Public Law 74-94
- ‘Cracking the Comparator Problem, “Equal” Treatment and the role of Comparisons’ [2006] European Human Rights Law Review 650 - 677
- ‘Do Privacy Rights Disappear in the Workplace?’ [2003] European Human Rights Law Review, 120-140
- ‘Principles of Equality and Protection from Discrimination in International Human Rights Law’ [2003] European Human Rights Law Review, 157-175
- ‘Do Privacy Rights Disappear in the Workplace?’ [2003] European Human Rights Law Review, 120-140
- ‘Women and the Human Rights Act’ (2000) 51(3) Northern Ireland Law Quarterly
- ‘Common Law and the Relevance of Sexual History Evidence’ (1996) 16 Oxford Journal of Legal Studies 275-307
- ‘In Defence of Battered Women who Kill’ (1993) 13 Oxford Journal of Legal Studies, 508-529

Books

- A Manifesto for Labour Law (2016)
- Hugh Collins, Keith Ewing, Aileen McColgan, Labour Law, Text, Cases and Materials (2nd edn Hart 2005) ISBN 1-84113-362-0
- Discrimination: Text, Cases and Materials (Hart: 2005 (2nd ed) and 2000 (1st ed))
- Discrimination Law Handbook (ed.) (LAG, 2005 (2nd ed) and 2002 (1st ed))
- Equality and Diversity (ed), Institute of Employment Rights 2003 (Sept 2003)
- Women under the Law; the False Promise of Human Rights (Essex: Longman, 1999)
- Just Wages For Women (Oxford: Clarendon Press, October 1997)
- The Future of Labour Law (ed) (London: Mansell, 1996)
- The Case For Taking the ‘Date’ out of Rape (London: Pandora, 1996)

== See also ==
- UK labour law
