= M. Sornarajah =

Sri Lankan academic

Muthucumaraswamy Sornarajah (Tamil: முத்துகுமாரஸ்வாமி ஸ்வர்ணராஜ; born 24 April 1942) is a legal academic. He is an Emeritus Professor and former C. J. Koh Professor of Law at the National University of Singapore, the Tunku Abdul Rahman Professor of Law at the University of Malaya, and the former head of the school of law at the University of Tasmania. He is also a visiting professor at the Centre for Human Rights, London School of Economics. He has been arbitrator, counsel or expert in several leading investment arbitrations.

Sornarajah attended the Royal College Colombo and received law degrees from the University of Ceylon, Yale University, the London School of Economics and King's College London (PhD). He taught at the University of Ceylon from 1966 to 1973, at the University of Tasmania from 1974 to 1984, and the National University of Singapore since 1986. He has also been visiting faculty at several other universities. He has been editor-in-chief of two journals, the Singapore Journal of Legal Studies from 1996 to 2000 and the Singapore Journal of International and Comparative Law (which he founded) from 1998 to 2000.

His book, The International Law on Foreign Investment (Cambridge University Press), is the leading and a classic text on foreign investment law, which is an area of public international law dealing with issues of protection of investments made by foreign investors currently in its fifth edition.

His other books include Law of International Joint Ventures, The Pursuit of Nationalized Property, Resistance and Change in the International Law on Foreign Investment (Cambridge University Press) and The Misery of International Law (with John Linarelli and Margot Salomon, Oxford University Press).

In 2016, a book of essays in his honour was edited by Lim Chin Leng entitled "Alternative Visions in International Law: Essays in honour of Muthucumraswamy Sornarajah (Cambridge University Press 2016) He has sat as arbitrator on several arbitral tribunals involving foreign investment disputes. He also belongs to the Board of Advisors of the United Nations Conference on Trade and Development Project on Dispute Settlement.
