= Eva Lomnicka =

British academic

Eva Zofia Lomnicka
- Born: 17 May 1951 (age 75); London
- Citizenship: British
- Education: Cambridge University; MA and LLB
- Known for: Financial Services Law

Eva Zofia Lomnicka (born 17 May 1951) is a professor of law at King's College London School of Law. She contributes to a number of leading texts and is an expert on the law of consumer credit and financial services law more generally. She has been appointed Queen's Counsel Honoris Causa in 2020 and retired as a Barrister from Lincoln's Inn.

== Biography ==
Eva has graduated her Bachelor of Laws and Master of Arts degrees at Cambridge University and qualified as a barrister. Her early work focused on discrimination, but soon moved into the fields of consumer credit, as the Consumer Credit Act 1974 was passed. The subsequent overhaul of consumer credit laws implemented in the Consumer Credit Act 2006 was prepared by the then Department of Trade and Industry’s ‘Consumer Credit Steering Group’ in which Eva was involved.

In 1975, she joined King's College London as a lecturer and became professor in 1993.

On 21 January 2020 she was awarded the title of Queen's Counsel Honoris Causa, one of ten individuals to receive the award in the year.

Eva is a Bencher of the Middle Temple and was practising barrister with an advisory practice in consumer credit and financial services regulation at Lincoln's Inn Chambers.

== Publications ==
Articles

- 'The future of consumer credit regulation: a chance to rationalise sanctions for breaches of financial services regulatory regimes?' (2013) 34(1) Company Lawyer 13
- 'The preventing and controlling the manipulation of financial markets: Towards a Definition of "Market Manipulation"' (2001) 8(4) Journal of Financial Crime 297
- '"Knowingly concerned"? Participatory liability to regulators' (2000) 21(4) Company Lawyer 120
- 'Unfair credit relationships: five years on' (2012) 8 Journal of Business Law 713
- 'Education and the Sex Discrimination Act 1975'
- 'The enforcement of anti-discrimination law'

Books

- The Law of Security and Title-Based Financing (2012) with H Beale, M Bridge and L Gullifer
- Modern Banking Law (5th edn OUP 2009) ISBN 0-19-825759-7 with EP Ellinger and C Hare
- The Law of Personal Property Security (2007) with H Beale, M Bridge and L Gullifer

Practitioner guides

- Palmer's Company Law (25th edn Sweet & Maxwell 1991)
- Encyclopaedia of Financial Services Law (Sweet & Maxwell, 1987) ISBN 0-421-36880-2
- Encyclopaedia of Consumer Credit Law (Sweet & Maxwell 1975) ISBN 0-421-20810-4
- The Financial Services and Markets Act: An Annotated Guide (Sweet & Maxwell 2002) ISBN 0-421-80000-3
- Journal of Business Law (editor, Financial Services section) (Sweet & Maxwell)

== See also ==
- UK company law
- UK banking law
- English contract law
