= Tim Pryce =

English businessman

Tim John Robert Pryce (born 1 July 1965) is an English businessman and previous CEO of Terra Firma Capital Partners, a leading European private equity investment firm, and one of its founding members. Pryce is also on the board of the General Partners as well as part of Terra Firma's management committee. Pryce is reported to be the highest paid director at the firm.

== Early history and education ==
Pryce graduated from King's College London in 1988 with an Associateship and an L.L.B. in English Law. In 1991 Mr. Pryce qualified as a solicitor, and in 1995 as an advocate. He also received a Maitrise in French law from the Sorbonne in Paris. Before working at Terra Firma, he worked with Guy Hands at Nomura. He was General counsel at Terra Firma Capital Partners from 2002 prior to his appointment as Chief Executive Officer in 2009, replacing Guy Hands. Pryce speaks both French and English.

== Lawsuit against Citibank ==
In 2010 Pryce was a key witness in a lawsuit of Terra Firma against Citigroup over the alleged inflated bid for EMI.

== Dismissal of Damian Darragh ==
In February 2014, news media speculated that Pryce was involved in the decision, that was characterized by the press as surprising to investors, to ask Damian Darragh to leave the firm. Darragh was leading the firm's effort to raise 2 billion pounds for a renewable energy focused fund.
