= Conor Gearty =

Irish legal scholar (1957–2025)

Conor Anthony Gearty KC (Hon), FBA (4 November 1957 – 11 September 2025) was an Irish legal scholar who was the Professor of Human Rights Law in the law school of the London School of Economics. He was regarded as one of the world's most influential scholars on human rights. From 2002 to 2009, he was Director of the LSE Centre for the Study of Human Rights. His academic research focused primarily on civil liberties, terrorism, and human rights.

== Life and career ==
Gearty was born in Dublin, Ireland, in November 1957. Raised in Abbeylara, County Longford, Ireland, he was educated at Castleknock College, before going to University College Dublin as an undergraduate, and Wolfson College, Cambridge, where he received a master's in law. He had significant debating success in University, twice winning the Irish Times debating competition and serving as Auditor of the University College Dublin Law Society. Gearty became a fellow of Emmanuel College, Cambridge and completed a PhD there in 1986 in environmental law. In 1990, he moved to the school of law at King's College London, where he was first a senior lecturer, then a reader and finally (from 1995) a professor. He was a practising barrister and a founder member of Matrix Chambers. Gearty was a visiting professor at Boston University, the University of Richmond and the University of New South Wales. He received honorary degrees from Brunel University and Roehampton University. Gearty was an Honorary King's Counsel.

== Personal life ==
In 1986, Gearty married an American fellow Cambridge student, Diane Wales, who became a BBC producer. She died of cancer in 2011. From 2015, Gearty was married to Aoife Nolan, a human rights lawyer. He died on 11 September 2025, at the age of 67. Paying tribute, President of Ireland Michael D. Higgins said he was "an inspirational human rights figure for young scholars and activists in the field".

== Selected Bibliography ==
=== Books ===
- Homeland Insecurity: The Rise and Rise of Global Anti-Terrorism Law (2024)
- On Fantasy Island. Britain, Europe, and Human Rights (2016)
- Liberty and Security (2013)
- Gearty, Conor & Virginia Mantouvalou (2011). Debating social rights. Portland, Oregon: Hart Publishing.
- Essays on Human Rights and Terrorism (2008) Cameron May
- Civil Liberties (2007) Clarendon Publishing
- Can Human Rights Survive? (2006) Hamlyn Lectures
- Principles of Human Rights Adjudication (2004) Oxford University Press
- (with Keith Ewing)The Struggle for Civil Liberties
- (with Keith Ewing) Freedom under Thatcher: Civil Liberties in Modern Britain (1990) Oxford University Press

=== Essays and reporting ===
- Gearty, Conor (9 October 2025). "Unwelcome Remnants: Erasing the Human Rights Act". London Review of Books: 11–14.
- Gearty, Conor (1994). "The Cost of Human Rights: English Judges and the Northern Irish Troubles". Current Legal Problems (37): 19 40.
- Gearty, Conor (2001). "Unravelling Osman". Modern Law Review. 2 (64): 159–190.
- Gearty, Conor (20 June 1986). "Lords welcome in police rules". New Statesman: 12–13.
- "When it can be right to do wrong", The Tablet (11 October 2008)
