= Industrial Law Journal =

British legal journal

- Discipline: Labour law
- Language: English

Publication details
- History: 1971–present

Standard abbreviations
- ISO 4: Ind. Law J.

The Industrial Law Journal is a legal journal which publishes articles in the field of labour and employment law, published quarterly by the Industrial Law Society in the United Kingdom, and founded in 1971.

The journal publishes articles on topics relating to employment law in the European Community and Commonwealth of Nations, although its coverage is not exclusive to these jurisdictions. The journal has carried articles on transnational labour law, legal issues concerning immigrant domestic workers, freedom of speech in the workplace, globalization, work–life balance, and more.

The journal also features reviews of new government documents relevant to employment law, and book reviews.

The journal targets an audience of practicing lawyers, academics, and industrial relations experts.
