= Dan Sarooshi =

British legal scholar

Dan Sarooshi KC
- Education: University of New South Wales; London School of Economics
- Occupations: Barrister; academic
- Known for: Expertise in international law, investment treaty arbitration, and constitutional law
- Office: Professor of Public International Law in the University of Oxford; Senior Research Fellow of the Queen's College, Oxford

Dan Sarooshi KC is Professor of Public International Law in the University of Oxford where he has taught since 2003, an English barrister King's Counsel and Senior Research Fellow of The Queen's College, Oxford., known for his expertise in international law, investment treaty arbitration, and constitutional law.

== Career ==
Professor Dan Sarooshi KC is a specialist advocate and leading authority globally on public international law and investment arbitration. He also has considerable experience in public, regulatory, and constitutional law as well as high value commercial litigation. He combines his full-time advocacy and litigation services with his position as Professor of Public International Law at the University of Oxford. He joined the University of Oxford and The Queen's College, Oxford in 2003 and was promoted to a full Professorship in the Faculty of Law, University of Oxford in 2006.

As a UK Barrister and KC he has a track record of success in high profile cases. He has argued over 110 cases as advocate and counsel for States, international organisations, and corporations in international courts (International Court of Justice, European Court of Human Rights, WTO, UN Tribunals), investment arbitrations (International Centre for Settlement of Investment Disputes (ICSID), ICSID AF, Energy Charter Treaty (ECT), Permanent Court of Arbitration (PCA), NAFTA (NAFTA), International Chamber of Commerce (ICC), UNCITRAL, and London Court of Arbitration), and the highest domestic courts in the UK, Hong Kong, BVI, and Bahamas. His clients include 25 States (e.g. UK and USA), 23 international organisations, and corporations (e.g. BAT, Exxon Mobil, Kuwait Investment Office and Tesco) and his cases include:

► 7 cases before the International Court of Justice (e.g. representing the UAE, UK, and Kuwait);

► 45 investor-State arbitrations for both States and investors under ICSID, ECT, ICC, LCIA, NAFTA, PCA, & UNCITRAL Rules; and

► 60 cases before UK and other national courts, including eleven cases before the UK Supreme Court and Court of Appeal and eight cases for the US Government on sovereign immunity issues.

In 2025, he was UK Barrister of the Year Finalist (The Lawyer Awards 2025) and Barrister of the Year Finalist (Legal Business Awards 2025).

Before being appointed KC, he was a member of both the UK Attorney General (AG) Panel of Counsel for Public International Law cases and the AG Panel of Counsel for Constitutional and Commercial Law cases. He was also appointed by the UK and EU to the panel of arbitrators appointed to hear Brexit-related disputes.

Sarooshi has published four books on international law which were awarded the American Society of International Law book prize (Certificate of Merit) twice (in 2001 and 2006), 1999 Swiss Guggenheim Prize, and 2006 US Myres McDougal Prize. He is General Editor and author with Sir Michael Wood KCMG, KC of Oppenheim’s International Law (forthcoming: 10th ed., OUP); served previously as joint General Editor of the Oxford University Press series Oxford Monographs in International Law; and has authored over 50 articles/chapters, including the 125 pp. co-authored chapter with Judge Dame Rosalyn Higgins (former ICJ President) entitled “Institutional Modes of Conflict Management”.

Sarooshi delivered the Hague Academy of International Law lectures on “Immunities of States and International Organizations in National Courts” in 2018; was elected in 2008 to the Executive Council of the American Society of International Law; and as Trustee of the British Institute of International & Comparative Law.

== Education ==
A graduate of the University of New South Wales in Australia, Sarooshi obtained a Phd from the London School of Economics supervised by Judge Dame Rosalyn Higgins and an LLM from the King's College London. Sarooshi was awarded an honorary MA degree from the University of Oxford.
