= Peer Zumbansen =

German legal academic (born 1966)

Peer Zumbansen is the inaugural professor of business law at the faculty of law of McGill University. Before joining McGill in January 2021, Zumbansen held the inaugural chair in transnational law at The Dickson Poon School of Law, King's College London. At King's, he served as the founding director of the Transnational Law Institute, and the faculty co-director of the Transnational Law Summer Institute [TLSI]. Since 2018, he is co-director of the Transnational Law Institute, together with Dr Emily Barritt and Dr Octavio Ferraz, both of the Dickson Poon School of Law.

Combining legal theory, comparative private law and transnational regulatory governance, Zumbansen's research focuses on the interplay between public and private norm-creating bodies and the evolving transnational legal pluralism of formal and informal norms, codes and standards. A recipient of teaching awards at Osgoode and King's as well as from the Province of Ontario, Zumbansen has held visiting professorships at Yale, Melbourne, FGV Sao Paulo, Paris Dauphine, Lucerne, St Gallen, Hamburg, Bremen, UCD Dublin, Deusto Bilbao, Idaho, Osgoode, inter alia. At McGill, he launched - in October 2021 - the McGill Business Law Meter, an online forum for timely commentary and discussion of current developments in Canadian and transnational business law. He is also the Convener of the McGill Seminars in Business and Society, a speaker series, that brings together practitioners and academics to explore key challenges in global business law.

From 2004 to 2014, Peer Zumbansen was professor of law at Osgoode Hall Law School, in Toronto, Canada, and holder of the Canada Research Chair in Transnational Economic Governance and Legal Theory. He is a co-founder of the German Law Journal and was Co-editor in chief from 2000 to 2013. At Osgoode, he was the founder and editor in Chief of the CLPE Comparative Research in Law & Political Economy Research Paper Series. He is a Founding Member and, since January 2012, the Editor in Chief of Transnational Legal Theory: A Quarterly Journal, and a member of the Advisory Board of Kritische Justiz.

== Career ==
Peer Zumbansen completed his doctorate and worked as a senior research fellow at Johann Wolfgang Goethe-University, Frankfurt from 1998 to 2004. In 2004 he became a professor at Osgoode Hall Law School, as associate professor with tenure in 2006, and a full professor in 2009. At Osgoode, Zumbansen was the recipient of two major Canada Foundation for Innovation (CFI) grants and established the Critical Research Laboratory in Law and Society (Programs: CLPE Comparative Research in Law & Political Economy, 2004 and CURL Collaborative Urban Research Laboratory, 2006). He also served as the Co-Director of the European Union Centre of Excellence at York University from 2010 to 2012. In 2010-2011, Zumbansen held a York-Massey Fellowship after completing a term as Associate Dean Research of Graduate Studies and Institutional Relations at Osgoode Hall Law School from 2007 to 2009. From May to August 2013, he was the inaugural Chair in Global Law at Tilburg Law School in The Netherlands. In July 2014, he joined the Dickson Poon School of Law, King’s College London as the inaugural Professor of Transnational Law and the Founding Director of the Transnational Law Institute.

Peer Zumbansen joined the McGill University Faculty of Law as Professor of Business Law in January 2021, where his research focuses on private law, specifically contracts and corporate law, on transnational law, legal theory and legal sociology.

== Books ==
- PhD: Ordnungsmuster im modernen Wohlfahrtsstaat: Lernerfahrungen zwischen Staat, Gesellschaft und Vertrag. Nomos: Baden-Baden 2000.
- Habilitation: Innovation und Pfadabhängigkeit. Das Recht der Unternehmensverfassung in der Wissensgesellschaft. Habilitation, Goethe University, Frankfurt, Faculty of Law, 2004.
- The Many Lives of Transnational Law: Critical Engagements with Jessup’s Bold Proposal (Cambridge University Press, April 2020)
- The Embedded Firm: Labour Corporate Governance and Finance Capitalism, Cambridge University Press 2011 (co-edited with Cynthia Williams)
- Oxford Handbook of Transnational Law. Oxford University Press, Oxford & New York, 2021.
- Global Value Chains, Strategic Litigation & Transnational Advocacy (co-edited with Miriam Saage-Maaß, Palvasha Shahab, and Michael Bader), European Center for Constitutional and Human Rights, Springer: Berlin, 2021.
- Rough Consensus and Running Code: A Theory of Transnational Private Law (co-authored with Gralf-Peter Calliess, with a foreword by Stewart Macaulay). Hart Publishing: Oxford, UK / Portland, OR, xv, 366 pp., 2010.
- Law in Transition: Rights, Development and Transitional Justice, (Hart Publishing, 2014, co-edited with Ruth Buchanan, and with an Epilogue by Bryant Garth),
- Reshaping Markets. Economic Governance and Liberal Utopia (co-edited with Alessandro Somma and Bertram Lomfeld), Cambridge University Press 2016.
- Rudolf Wiethölter. Recht in Recht-Fertigungen. Ausgewählte Schriften (Peer Zumbansen & Marc Amstutz eds., Berliner Wissenschafts-Verlag, 2014).
- Politische Rechtstheorie Revisited: Rudolf Wiethölter zum 100. Semester. ZERP (Zentrum für Europäische Rechtspolitik) Diskussionspapier 1/2013 (co-edited with Ch. Joerges), University of Bremen, 2013.
- Beyond Territoriality. Transnational Legal Authority in an Age of Globalization, Brill, 2012 (co-edited with Günther Handl & Joachim Zekoll).
- Comparative Law as Transnational Law: A Decade of the German Law Journal, Oxford University Press, 2012 (co-edited with Russell Miller).
- Law, Economics and Evolutionary Theory, Edward Elgar 2011 (co-edited with Gralf-Peter Calliess). Paperback 2012
- Soziologische Jurisprudenz. Festschrift für Gunther Teubner zum 65. Geburtstag, Walter de Gruyter, 2009 (co-edited with Gralf-Peter Calliess, Andreas Fischer-Lescano and Dan Wielsch).
- The Annual of German and European Law, Berghahn Books: Oxford/New York, Vol. II/III (2005) (co-edited with Russell Miller.
- The Annual of German and European Law, Berghahn Books: Oxford/New York, Vol. I (2003) (co-edited with Russell Miller).
- Zwangsarbeit im Dritten Reich: Erinnerung und Verantwortung. Juristische Und Zeitgeschichtliche Betrachtungen/NS-Forced Labor: Remembrance and Responsibility. Legal and Historical Observations, Nomos: Baden-Baden 200
