= Keith Ewing =

British legal scholar (born 1955)

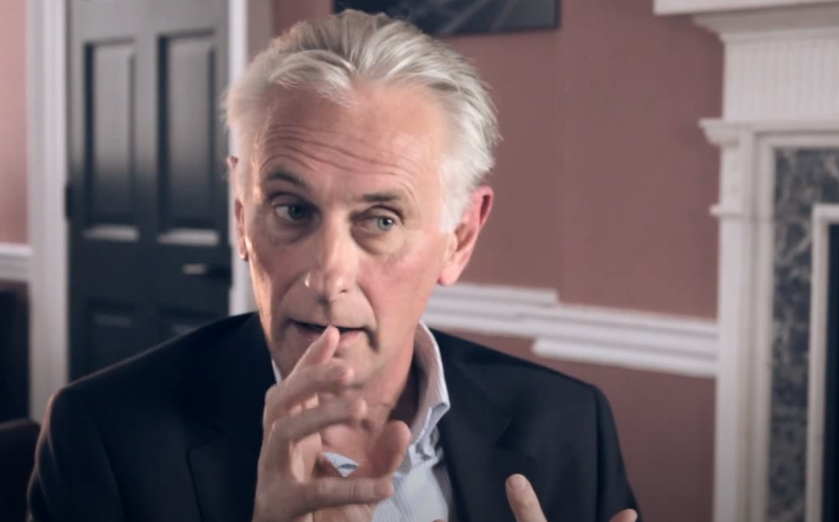
- Born: Keith David Ewing; 29 March 1955 (age 71); Dunfermline, Fife, Scotland
- Scientific career
- Fields: Constitutional law, public law, law of democracy, human rights and labour law
- Institutions: King's College London Cambridge University (1983–89) University of Edinburgh (1978–83)

Keith David Ewing (born 29 March 1955) is professor of public law at King's College London and recognised as a leading scholar in public law, constitutional law, law of democracy, labour law and human rights.

Ewing has been described as "one of the leading lights of English public law" and "one of the world's leading scholars of the constitution of social democracy". He is co-author of two standard textbooks in constitutional and administrative law, and labour law.

== Biography ==
Ewing studied law at Edinburgh University, graduating in 1976, then moved to Trinity Hall, Cambridge, for his PhD. He then went back to Edinburgh to begin his teaching career (1978–83), before returning to Cambridge (1983–9). In 1989, Ewing became Professor of Public Law at The Dickson Poon School of Law at King's College London. He has also taught at universities in Australia and Canada.

== Work ==
Ewing is the author, co-author or editor of dozens of books and journal articles. His work recognises the significance of an integrated and broad vision of the constitutional order.

He has written extensively on the funding of political parties, and has been described as "the most prolific and influential scholar in political finance in the common law world beyond the US". His first book on the topic, The Funding of Political Parties in Britain, was published in 1987.

Ewing has also published on reforming labour law to strengthen trade union freedom, constitutional reform, relating to public participation in the political process and the status of social and economic rights.

His COVID-19: Government by Decree (2020) argued there was a failure on the part of the British Parliament to discharge its basic constitutional duties during the pandemic.

To celebrate his scholarly legacy, The Constitution of Social Democracy: Essays in Honour of Keith Ewing was published in 2020.

== Publications ==
Books (selected)

- MI5, the Cold War, and the Rule of Law (Oxford University Press 2020)
- A Manifesto for Labour Law (2016)
- (with Jacob Rowbottom and Joo-Cheong Tham) The Funding of Political Parties: Where Now? (Routledge 2011)
- The Bonfire of the Liberties (Oxford University Press 2010)
- (with AW Bradley) Constitutional and Administrative Law (Longman 2007)
- The Cost of Democracy: Party Funding in Modern British Politics (Hart Publishing 2007)
- (with Samuel Issacharoff) Party Funding And Campaign Financing in International Perspective (Hart Publishing 2006) Columbia-London Law Series
- (with Hugh Collins and Aileen McColgan) Labour Law, Text, Cases and Materials (Hart Publishing 2005) ISBN 1-84113-362-0
- (with Tom Campbell and Adam Tomkins) Skeptical Essays on Human Rights (Oxford University Press 2002)
- (with Conor Gearty) The Struggle for Civil Liberties (Oxford University Press 2000)
- Money, Politics and Law: A Study of Electoral Campaign Finance Reform in Canada (Clarendon Press 1992)
- (with Conor Gearty) Freedom under Thatcher: Civil Liberties in Modern Britain (Oxford University Press 1990)
- Britain and the ILO (1989)
- The Funding of Political Parties in Britain (Cambridge University Press 1987)
- Trade Unions, the Labour Party, and the Law: A Study of the Trade Union Act 1913 (Edinburgh University Press 1982)

Recent articles and chapters (selected)

- The Repudiation of Buckley v. Valeo, Ewing, K., 2018, Democracy by The People: Reforming Campaign Finance in America. Eugene D. Mazo and Timothy K. Kuhner (eds.). Cambridge: Cambridge University Press, 2018.
- Civil Liberties and the Korean War. Ewing, K. 1 May 2018, In : Modern Law Review. 81, 3, p. 395-421
- The Strasbourg court treats trade unionists with contempt: Svenska Transportarbetareförbundet and Seko v Sweden. Ewing, K. D. & Hendy, Q. C. J., 5 Sep 2017, In : Industrial Law Journal. 46, 3, p. 435-443
- Brexit and Parliamentary Sovereignty. Ewing, K., 13 Jul 2017, In : Modern Law Review. 80, 4, p. 711-726
- Jeremy Corbyn and the law of democracy. Ewing, K., 4 May 2017, In : King's Law Journal. 28, 2, p. 343-362
- New perspectives on collective labour law: Trade union recognition and collective bargaining. Ewing, K. & Hendy, J., 1 Mar 2017, In : Industrial Law Journal. 46, 1, p. 23-51
- The Trade Union Act 2016 and the failure of human rights. Ewing, K. D. & John Hendy, Q. C., 1 Sep 2016, In : Industrial Law Journal. 45, 3, p. 391-422.
- La Unión Europea, los Estados Unidos de América y la Asociación Transatlántica para el comercio y la inversión (TTIP): La negociación colectiva y la emergente «ley transnacional de relaciones laborales». Ewing, K. D., 1 Jun 2016, In : Trabajo y Derecho. 18
- Special Issue: The Right To Strike: Editors’ preface. Ewing, K. D. & Hendy Q. C, J., 26 Apr 2016, In : King's Law Journal. 27, 1, p. 22-23
- Freedom of association. Bogg, A. & Ewing, K. D., 31 Jul 2015, Comparative Labor Law. Edward Elgar Publishing Ltd, p. 296-329
- Special issue constitutional law in Japan and the United Kingdom introduction. Yanai, K. & Ewing, K. D., 1 Jan 2015, In : King's Law Journal. 26, 2, p. 185-188
- The courts and the judiciary. Ewing, K. D., 1 Jan 2014, Central Debates in British Politics. Taylor and Francis Ltd., p. 409-430
- Doughty Defenders of the Human Rights Act. Ewing, K., 2012, Confronting the Human Rights Act 1998: Contemporary themes and perspectives. Kang-Riou, N., Milner, J. & Nayak, S. (eds.). Routledge, p. 119-138
- Economic Rights. Ewing, K., 2012, The Oxford Handbook of Comparative Constitutional Law. Rosenfeld, M. & Sajó, A. (eds.). Oxford University Press, p. 1036-1056 (Oxford Handbooks in Law).
- Labour Law. Collins, H., Ewing, K. & McColgan, A., 2012, Cambridge: Cambridge University Press. (Law in Context)
- What is the Point of Human Rights Law?. Ewing, K., 2012, Examining Critical Perspectives on Human Rights. Dickinson, R., Katselli, E., Murray, C. & Pedersen, O. W. (eds.). Cambridge: Cambridge University Press, p. 37-60
- ¿AV o no AV? Lecciones de Australia. Orr, G. & Ewing, K., 2012, Sistemas electorales y principios constitucionales, VIII Congreso Mundial de la Asociación Internacional de Derecho Constitucional/8th World Congress of the International Association of Constitutional Law. Mesa, I. (ed.). Mexico City: UNAM and Mexican Electoral Court, p. 241-266
- Introduction. Ewing, K. D. ., Campbell, T. & Tomkins, A., Sep 2011, The legal protection of human rights: Sceptical essays. Campbell, T., Keith, E. & Tomkins, A. (eds.). Oxford: Oxford University Press
- 'What today's charter of workers' rights looks like' (31 January 2011) The Guardian
- The legal protection of human rights: Sceptical essays. Campbell, T. (ed.), Ewing, K. D. . (ed.) & Tomkins, A. (ed.), Sep 2011, Oxford: Oxford University Press.
- Judges and Free Speech in the United Kingdom. Ewing, K., 2011, Judiciaries in comparative perspective. Lee, HP. (ed.). Cambridge, U.K: Cambridge University Press, p. 237-256
- Political Party Finance – Themes in International Perspective. Ewing, K., 2011, Electoral democracy: Australian prospects. Tham, J-C., Costar, B. J. & Orr, G. (eds.). Carlton, Vic: Melbourne University Publishing
- The Cold War, Civil Liberties and the House of Lords. Ewing, K. D. ., 2011, The legal protection of human rights: sceptical essays. Campbell, T., Keith, E. & Tomkins, A. (eds.). Oxford: Oxford University Press
- The Role of Spending Controls. Ewing, K. & Rowbottom, J., 2011, The funding of political parties: where now?. Ewing, K., Rowbottom, J. & Tham, J-C. (eds.). London: Routledge, p. 77-91 (Routledge research in comparative politics; vol. 44).
- The Trade Union Question in British Political Funding. Ewing, K., 2011, The funding of political parties: where now?. Ewing, K., Rowbottom, J. & Tham, J-C. (eds.). London: Routledge, p. 54-74 (Routledge research in comparative politics; vol. 44).
- A Procedural Assault on the Right to Strike – Lessons from Across the Irish Sea. Ewing, K., 2010, The Industrial Relations Act 1990: 20 years on. Kerr, T. (ed.). Dublin: Round Hall/Thomson Reuters
- Foreword. Ewing, K., 2010, Human rights at work: perspectives on law and regulation. Fenwick, C. F. & Novitz, T. (eds.). Oxford: Hart Pub, (Oñati international series in law and society).
- The dramatic implications of Demir and Baykara. Ewing, K. D. & John Hendy, Q. C., 2010, In : Industrial Law Journal. 39, 1, p. 2-51
- The Judiciary. Ewing, K., 2009, The Oxford handbook of British politics. Flinders, M. (ed.). Oxford: Oxford University Press, p. 262-282 (Oxford handbooks).
