= Habiba Osman =

Malawian human rights lawyer

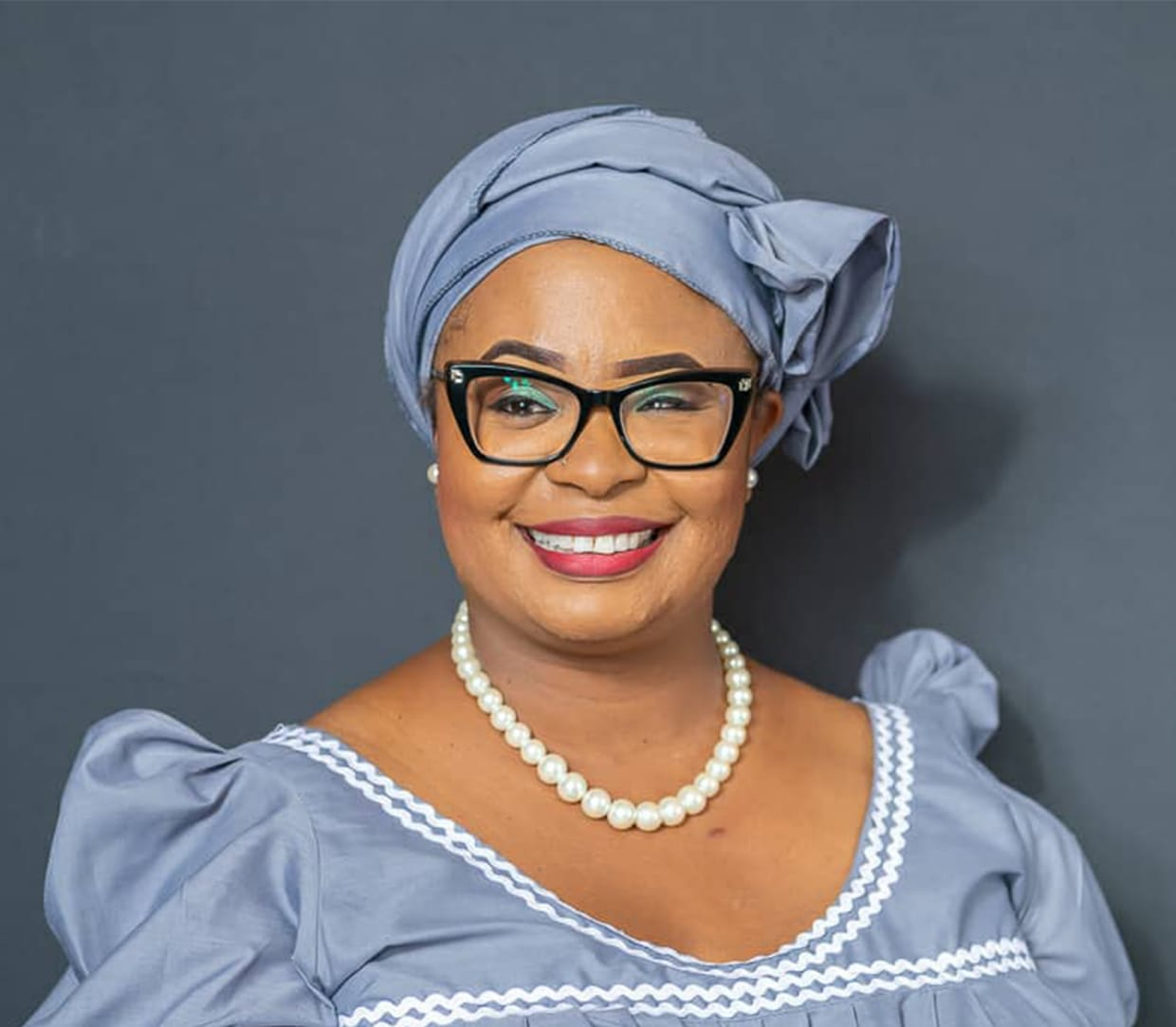
- Born: Blantyre, Malawi
- Education: Keele University (LLB); Notre Dame Law School (LLM)
- Occupation: Lawyer
- Employers: UN Women Malawi; MHRC

Habiba Rezwana Osman is a Malawian lawyer, focusing in human rights, gender, and governance. She works for the Malawi office of UN Women, and since November 2020 she has served as the executive secretary of the Malawi Human Rights Commission (MHRC).

== Early life and education ==
Osman grew up in the Kanjedza township in Malawi and completed her A-levels in Harare, Zimbabwe. She was invited to study law at Keele University in the United Kingdom, graduating with a dual honours degree in both law (LLB) and International History. Osman holds a Master of Laws (LLM) in International Human Rights Law from the Centre for Civil and Human Rights at Notre Dame Law School in the United States, where she qualified for a Fulbright scholarship.

== Career ==
Osman worked for UN Women in Malawi and in November 2020, she was appointed executive secretary of the Malawi Human Rights Commission (MHRC).

At UN Women in Malawi, she leads the Elimination of Violence Against Women and Girls (EVAWG) programme and the Gender Based Governance (GBG) team, well as advising an OHCHR group on international treaty obligations in 2019. She has served as acting deputy of the Kenya office of UN Women, and she oversaw the Spotlight Initiative in Malawi on behalf of UN Women. During her tenure, the MHRC was accredited by the International Conference of Information Commissioners (ICIC).

In January 2023, the MHRC launched an investigation into the arrest of Anti‑Corruption Bureau Director General Martha Chizuma after complaints that her rights were violated during the arrest. When media reports suggested the investigation had been suspended, Osman clarified that it was only pending appointment of additional commissioners, not formally halted.

Hilda Macheso, Ivy Kamanga, Tiwa Savage, Esther Bonyonga and Habiba Osman during GBV discussion at the Malawi Human Rights Commission in 2026.

The MHRC has raised concerns about the treatment of pre‑trial detainees, citing issues like remand overcrowding, abuse in custody, and delays in court processing. In 2012, she was arrested and detained (alongside other civil society actors) for protesting governance issues under the previous regime.

In 2024, Osman welcomed the move of nearly sixty young offenders from Maula Prison to an alternative facility, so that they could study for their primary school-leaving certificate.

In May 2026 she published her personal views concerning witchcraft and the law. She noted that mobs were claiming "justice" to cover acts of murder against elder people who were accused of witchcraft. The 2024 "Older Persons Act" had not been enforced. She suggested that action including local courts could bring the perpetrators to justice and prevent their feeling of impunity. The law had seen some success in containing the irrational mistreatment of albino people and she argued that this could be extended to protect Malawi's elder people. In June 2026 she was interviewed concerning the progress made in gender equality. Malawi's Gender Equality Act requires that neither gender can hold less than 40% of positions in Malawi. However George Chaponda has appointed only one woman in twenty heads of mission and Joseph Mwanamvekha created a Revenue Appeals Tribunal to settle tax disputes that included not even one woman. She said the commission had a serious concern about the disregard for the law. Women created most of the wealth but they were not having equal access to decisions.

== Awards and recognition ==
Osman was recognized among Malawi's Top 100 Women by the Office of the Ombudsman. She received an Achievement Award from the Malawi Government through the Ministry of Home Affairs and Internal Security for her work on human trafficking.

In 2022, Osman received the Woman of the Year Substance Award in the Human Rights category from Ritz Attorneys.

She also serves as an Advisory Board Member for the USA-based nonprofit organization SciArtsRUs. In 2017, she was honored by Vital Voices as a Fellow for her work in human rights and gender equality.
