= Stella Twea =

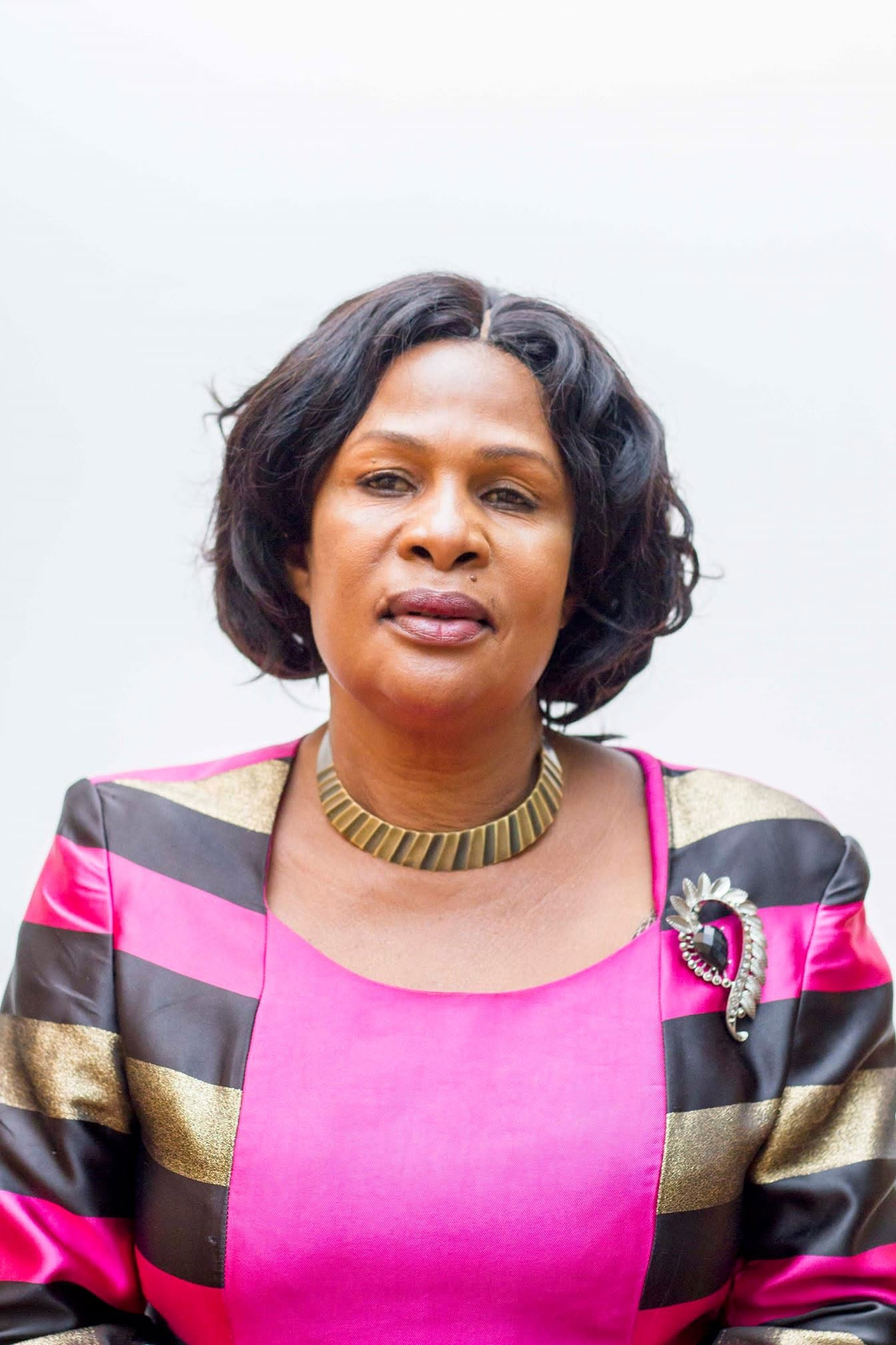
- in 2021
- Education: University of Malawi, University of Zimbabwe
- Occupation: lawyer
- Employer: Malawi Human Rights Commission
- Known for: Human Rights Commissioner

Stella Twea is a Malawian women's rights expert who was a Malawi Human Rights Commissioner until 2026.

== Biography ==
Twea graduated from the University of Malawi with a degree in Education and later obtained a master's degree in Women’s Law from the University of Zimbabwe. She worked as a secondary school teacher.

Inspired by the details of a particular case, Twea established the Centre for Alternatives for Victimized Women and Children (CAVWOC) in 1998. She founded the organisation using money she had set aside for her pension.

In 2019, Malawi's President Peter Mutharika appointed Twea, along with Dr Sunduzwayo Madise, Boniface Massa, Dr Bertha Sefu, Scader Louis, Chiyamwaka, and Rev. Cecilia Kotia, as members of the seventh cohort of human rights commissioners. The commission was completed by Law Commissioner and Ombudsman Martha Chizuma.

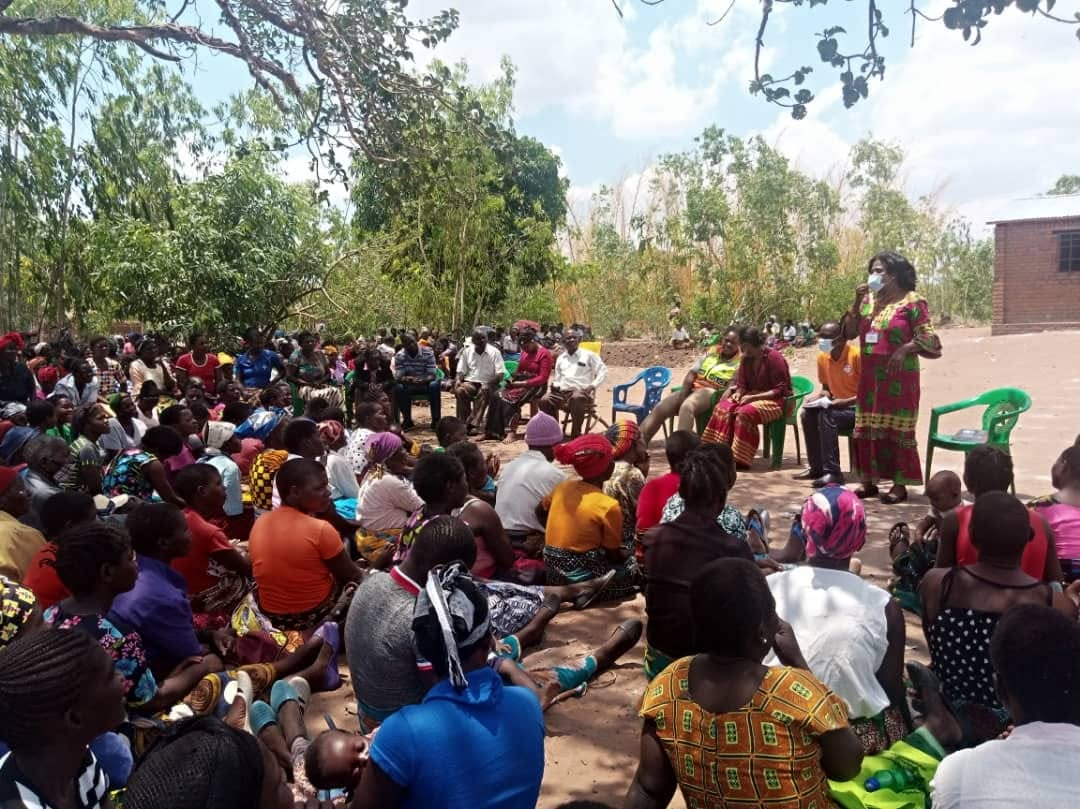
Commissioner Twea emphasising gender equality in Phalombe.

In 2021, Twea was involved in a high-profile case concerning sexual harassment at the Malawi Broadcasting Corporation. Her investigation confirmed the allegations of harassment and recommended compensation for those affected. She also recommended that the corporation's director, Aubrey Sumbuleta, be prosecuted under the Gender Equality Act. Lawyer Sarai Chisala said that the corporation itself was liable because it had been aware of the issue but allowed the abuse to continue.

President Lazarus Chakwera had expressed the need for a database of women who could be considered for presidential appointments. Twea created a database containing women with postgraduate degrees, which would be periodically updated.
