= Maula Prison =

Prison in Lilongwe, Malawi

- Interactive map of Maula Prison
- Location: Lilongwe, Malawi; 13°58′10″S 33°46′1″E
- Status: Operational
- Security class: Maximum (male and female)
- Capacity: 800
- Population: 2,800 (in 2018)
- Opened: c. 1965
- Managed by: Malawi Government

Maula Prison is a maximum-security prison located in Lilongwe, Malawi. The overcrowded prison is for men, women, and young offenders. The shortages include cells, toilets, showers, taps, and food.

== History ==
The prison was constructed in about 1965 to hold 800 people during the presidency of Hastings Kamuzu Banda. The prison is the largest in the country and it is over-crowded. Cells designed for 60 people contain over 190. Many Ethiopian migrants are held here. In 2016, there were 2,650 prisoners. It was reported that 160 of these may have completed their sentences, but they had not been released, as these migrants must pay for their own deportation. A single tap can be shared by 900 and a toilet can serve 160. Nearly 200 share a shower. Beans are served once a week to supplement the daily meal of corn flour porridge. In 2018, the population was said to have been 2,800.

Medicins Sans Frontiers has offered medical services there since 2014, not only to the inmates but also to the poorly paid staff, as they cannot afford to consult a doctor.

In 2022, Rudo Chakwera was at the prison entertaining the prisoners in the young offenders section. She was there with other musicians including Chikondi Wiseman. The facility was new and facing challenges including a lack of food. The young offenders' education was not supported. In 2024, Malawi Human Rights Commission secretary Habiba Osman welcomed the move of nearly sixty of them to an alternative facility, so that they could study for their primary school-leaving certificate.

== Corruption ==
In 2016, four prisoners escaped from a cell holding 100. The authorities arrested two of the warders suspecting collusion. In September 2021, wildlife trader Lin Yunhua was sentenced to 14 years in prison for both illegal trading and money laundering. He had dealt in tonnes of pangolin scales, rhino horn and ivory and was expected to be deported. In 2021, it was revealed that he had allegedly offered a large bribe and to pay for the completion of a house for the officer-in-charge of Maula Prison, Aaron Ganyavu. The bribe was offered in the hope of influencing the judge, Violet Chipao, to give Lin Yunhua a more lenient sentence. In 2025, Lin Yunhua was surprisingly pardoned by President Lazarus Chakwera, but was rearrested by the Anti-Corruption Bureau.

== See also ==
- Welcome to Maula Prison, film set in the prison
