= Malawi Human Rights Commission =

Human Rights Organization

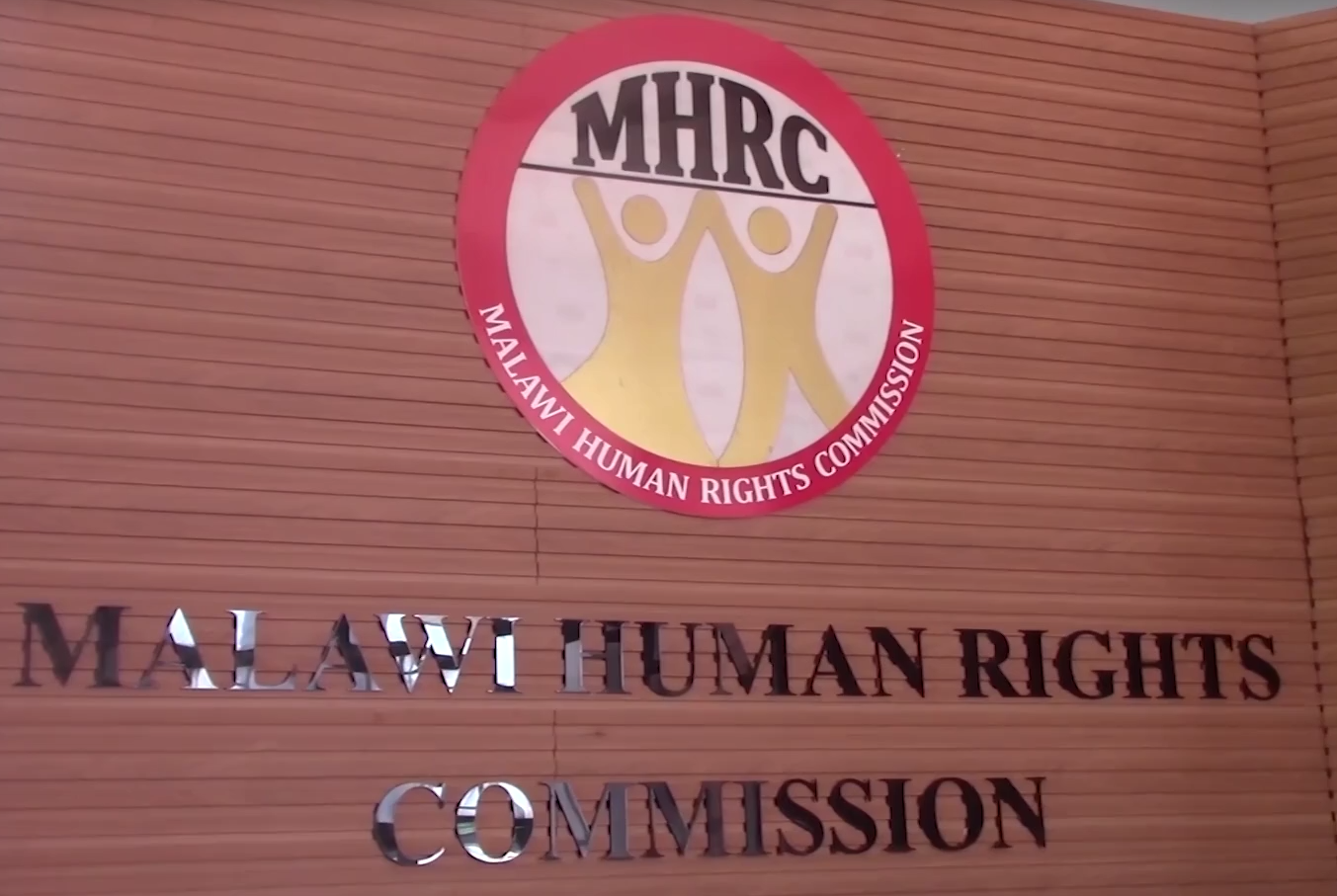
- Formation: 1994; 32 years ago
- Founder: Constitution of Malawi
- Headquarters: Lilongwe
- Region served: Malawi
- Key people: Habiba Osman (CEO)

The Malawi Human Rights Commission was established in 1994 by the country's constitution to oversee human rights in Malawi. In 2012, the UN Deputy High Commissioner for Human Rights Kyung-wha Kang said that the MHRC had “done exemplary work...".

== History ==
The Malawi Human Rights Commission (MHRC) was established by the country's 1994 constitution to oversee human rights in Malawi and it became fully functional in 1998 or 1999.

The MHRC is charged with protecting human rights and investigating violations and advising government. The commission has “broad powers to hear and obtain any necessary evidence, to conduct searches after obtaining a warrant issued by a magistrate, and to exercise 'unhindered authority' to visit detention center[s] 'with or without notice.'” It does not have the power to prosecute offenders, but it “can intervene in court cases and it has acted as amicus curiae.” Transparency International reported in 2004 that “the MHRC is perceived as one of the most efficient public institutions in the country.”

During the presidency of Bingu wa Mutharika, the Human Rights Commission was hampered by a lack of resources and a fear of reprisals. The MHRC retained its independence, according to the Human Rights Institute of the International Bar Association, as “exhibited through the concerted efforts of the outgoing chair of the MHRC, John Kapito,” whose open criticism of Mutharika's government resulted in threats and harassment". The MHRC continued “to execute its mandate to the best of its ability.” In 2009, the MHRC supported a women's rights group when it unsuccessfully sued the government claiming that the anti-abortion law infringed on women's rights.

In June 2012, UN Deputy High Commissioner for Human Rights Kyung-wha Kang said that the MHRC had “done exemplary work, including through very difficult times in the past year. It is important that the independence and broad mandate of the MHRC are maintained and respected.”

Swearing in new members of the Commission in August 2012, President Banda assured them of her support for their work and of her commitment to their independence. She urged them to make the most of their “advisory role” and assured them “that nobody will be arrested by my office and I shall not hesitate to seek advice from your institution.”

Habiba Osman (left) signing an MOU with Malawi's Gender and Justice Unit's Lynda Ndovie-Jere, September 2026

In 2019 the President Mutharika appointed Dr Sunduzwayo Madise, Boniface Massa, Dr Bertha Sefu, Stella Twea, Scader Louis, Chiyamwaka and Rev. Cecilia Kotia to become the 7th cohort of human rights commissioners. The commission was completed by the Law Commissioner and Ombudsman Martha Chizuma. Chizuma had to write to the President to object to Chiyamwaka and Rev. Cecilia Kotia as they were names that had not been recommended to the President. Chizuma said that the President had acted illegally as the constitution did not allow him to freely appoint human rights commissioners.

In 2020 Habiba Osman was appointed as the commission's Executive Secretary taking over from David Nungo. In the following year the Commission required the Malawi Broadcasting Corporation to pay compensation after it was found that the former CEO, Aubrey Sumbuleta, had sexually harassed women staff members. The report was written by Stella Twea, of the commission’s gender and women’s rights’ committee.

The Reverend Patrick Semphere had held the chair of the commission from March 2020 until he died from COVID-19 in 2021. He was replaced by Chikondi Chijozi.

In 2025, Habiba Osman, spoke out over concerns that peaceful demonstrators had been attacked and the police had failed to protect them. She said that the "security apparatus must be held accountable".

In May 2026 the Law Commissioner Rosemary Kanyuka and the Ombudsman Grace Malera called for nominations to be a new human rights commissioner in line with Section 4 of the Human Rights Commission Act and the constitution. The serving cohort had been appointed in 2023 and their terms were coming to an end, but half of them would be asked to serve again. Various organisations were invited to propose a candidate including the Women Lawyers Association, the Malawi Law Society (MLS), the Centre for Human Rights and Rehabilitation (CHRR), and Youth and Society (YAS). religious organisations such as the Muslim Association of Malawi, the Catholic Commission for Justice and Peace (CCJP) and the Anglican Council in Malawi were also included as well as the Centre for Democracy and Economic Development Initiatives (CDEDI), the Human Rights Defenders Coalition (HRDC) and the Public Affairs Committee (PAC).

== Commissioners ==
Rosemary Kanyuka who became Malawi's first woman Director of Public Prosecutions in 2010 became a human rights commissioner because she was the Law Commissioner at the Malawi Law Commission.

The lawyer Chikondi Chijozi became a commissioner in 2021. Lawyer, Marshal Chilenga, was a commissioner and he went on to lead Rotary International in Malawi, Zambia, Zimbabwe and northern Mozambique from 2025.

Journalist Teresa Ndaga who led the Media Institute of Southern Africa in Malawi was a commissioner from 2023 and she was included again in 2026 when the new consort of commissioners was announced. The others were Orison Joseph Themba Chapond, Viwemi Chavula, Godfrey Dalitso Kangaude, Andrew Kavala, Lingalireni Mihowa and Stella Nkhonya. The nine strong commission is completed by the Law Commissioner and the Ombudsman.

== Notable staff ==
Justice Fiona Mwale was the commission's Principal Legal Officer before she became a High Court judge in 2012. The human rights lawyer Sarai Chisala-Tempelhoff worked for the Malawi Human Rights Commission for fifteen years.
