= Maria Chidzanja Nkhoma =

Malawian broadcaster and actor (1952–2021)

- Born: 9 August 1952
- Died: 9 January 2021 (aged 68); Kamuzu Central Hospital
- Known for: Singer, actor

Maria Chidzanja Nkhoma (9 August 1952 – 9 January 2021) was a Malawian singer, actor and broadcaster.

== Life ==
Nkhoma was born in 1952 and in 1982 she began her career as a presenter and announcer at the state owned Malawi Broadcasting Corporation. She was there for 12 years and she also worked as a producer. She supplemented her income by singing as she brought up three children. In 1985–1986 she was one of the people MBC sent to South Korea for training.

She took part in choral workshops at Chancellor College where her singing "galvanised the audience" according to Mellonee Burnim in the Oxford Handbook of Music and World Christianities.

Nkhoma was the head of the women and children's department at the Zodiak Broadcasting Station when she died at the isolation centre at Kamuzu Central Hospital from COVID-19. She was one of the most famous people in Malawi to die as a result of the pandemic.

Nkhoma had played the title character in a new TV series named Apongozi. It was based on two long running radio series. Ten episodes had been filmed and these were broadcast and dedicated to her memory. At the premiere of the first episodes a song about her was sung by Rudo Chakwera.
