= Malawi Broadcasting Corporation =

Malawian state-run radio company

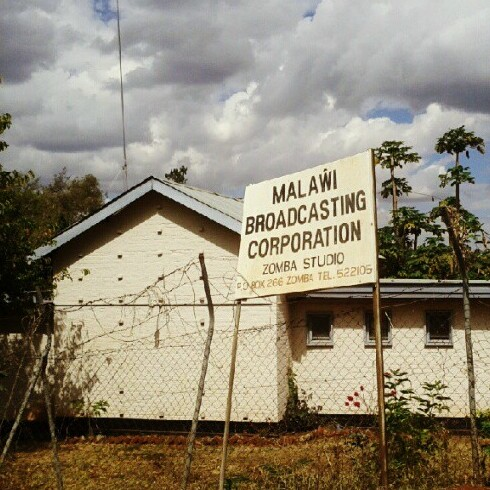
- MBC studio in Zomba in 2012
- Type: Broadcast radio and television
- Country: Malawi
- Founded: June 8, 1964
- Headquarters: Blantyre, Malawi
- Broadcast area: National
- Owner: Government of Malawi
- Launch date: 1964
- Digital channel: yes
- Official website: www.mbc.mw

The Malawi Broadcasting Corporation is a state-run radio and television company in Malawi.

== History ==
Radio was introduced to Malawi, then the British colony of Nyasaland, in 1941, when the Information Department of the government of neighbouring Northern Rhodesia, another British colony, installed a 300-watt transmitter in its capital, Lusaka, to provide a service to all African citizens of the Rhodesian region, Radio Lusaka, in both English and local African languages. Since Northern Rhodesia could not afford such a specialist service alone, the administrators of Southern Rhodesia and Nyasaland were soon persuaded to share the costs, while the British government agreed to provide share capital; thus the Central African Broadcasting Station (CABS) was born.

In 1953 the United Kingdom created the Federation of Rhodesia and Nyasaland with Salisbury (now Harare, Zimbabwe) as its capital; The Southern Rhodesian Broadcasting Service, which operated in Southern Rhodesia for European listeners, was subsequently renamed the "Federal Broadcasting Service" (FBS).

In 1958 FBS and CABS formed the Federal Broadcasting Corporation (FBC).

MBC was founded in 1964 empowered by an act of parliament. It has two radio stations, Radio 1 and Radio 2, and transmits on FM, Medium Wave and Shortwave frequencies and Online and MBC 2 Malawi.

It also runs the national television station, Television Malawi.

Its headquarters is in Blantyre.

The MBC provided the maintenance for the relays of the BBC World Service in the country for BBC after 2001.

In 2021 the Malawi Human Rights Commission required the MBC to pay compensation after Stella Twea found that the former CEO, Aubrey Sumbuleta, had sexually harassed women staff members. Lawyer Sarai Chisala said that the Corporation itself was liable because they had known about the problem, but they had allowed the abuse to continue.

== Notable MBC people ==
Nyokase Madise joined MBC in 1964 and worked until 1994 as a presenter, reporter,and producer. She was the second woman to be employed by MBC. Madise died in 2024.

Maria Chidzanja Nkhoma joined MBC in 1982 and worked as broadcaster here for the first twelve years of her career.

Geoffrey Kapusa, started a music programme called Music Splash. In 2012, he retired after over 20 years. He passed away on 23 April 2024, aged 52.

Hassan Goba was one of the station's veteran broadcasters until 2017.

Anne Kadammanja, joined MBC in the 2010s before she died in 2018. She was known for creating several programs on the radio such as "hot 26", "Lover's night" and "Why did you lose them?" and hosting the morning program, "breakfast show".

Chisomo Ngulube became the chief editor for MBC's television news. Romeo Umali is a news anchor and editor and has won several awards in sports writing.

Rehana Nyamilandu Manda was a well known TV personality who died on 29 December 2011. She was buried at Misesa Cemetery in Chigumula Blantyre. Politicians Sidick Mia, Charles Mchacha, and Mosses Dossi joined the then FAM president Walter Nyamilandu Manda in mourning his ex-wife who succumbed to pneumonia at Malamulo Private Hospital.

== See also ==
- Malawi Media Women's Association
