= Ngulube =

Ngulube is a surname. Notable people with the surname include:

- Chisomo Ngulube, Malawian journalist and editor
- Madyina Ngulube, Malawian football midfielder
- Samson Ngulube (born 2005), Zambian football defender
- Tutwa Ngulube, Zambian barrister and politician
