= Corruption in Malawi =

Corruption in Malawi has a long and complex history with rapid evolvement over time. During the colonial era, corruption was prevalent, with colonial officials embezzling funds and engaging in other corrupt practices. After independence in 1964, Hastings Kamuzu Banda's regime perpetuated corruption, using state resources for personal gain and suppressing any opposition.

In the early 2000s, the government established institutions such as the Anti-Corruption Bureau and the Directorate of Public Prosecutions to combat corruption. However, these efforts were hampered by lack of political will, inadequate funding, and limited capacity.

Corruption has taken many forms in Malawi, including bribery, embezzlement, nepotism, abuse of power, and political corruption. Public officials have been known to demand bribes for services, while politicians have embezzled funds meant for development projects.

In Transparency International's 2025 Corruption Perceptions Index, Malawi scored 34 on a scale from 0 ("highly corrupt") to 100 ("very clean"). When ranked by score, Malawi ranked 109th among the 182 countries in the Index, where the country ranked first is perceived to have the most honest public sector. For comparison with regional scores, the best score among sub-Saharan African countries (Note: Angola, Benin, Botswana, Burkina Faso, Burundi, Cameroon, Cape Verde, Central African Republic, Chad, Comoros, Côte d'Ivoire, Democratic Republic of the Congo, Djibouti, Equatorial Guinea, Eritrea, Eswatini, Ethiopia, Gabon, Gambia, Ghana, Guinea, Guinea-Bissau, Kenya, Lesotho, Liberia, Madagascar, Malawi, Mali, Mauritania, Mauritius, Mozambique, Namibia, Niger, Nigeria, Republic of the Congo, Rwanda, Sao Tome and Principe, Senegal, Seychelles, Sierra Leone, Somalia, South Africa, South Sudan, Sudan, Tanzania, Togo, Uganda, Zambia, and Zimbabwe.) was 68, the average was 32 and the worst was 9. For comparison with worldwide scores, the best score was 89 (ranked 1), the average was 42, and the worst was 9 (ranked 181, in a two-way tie).

== Causes ==
The causes of corruption in Malawi are multifaceted. Greed, lack of transparency, poverty, and low salaries have contributed to the problem. Weak institutions, lack of rule of law, and power imbalances have also enabled corruption to thrive. The effects of corruption have been devastating. Economic development has been stifled, poverty has persisted, and public trust in government has been eroded. Essential services like healthcare and education have suffered due to diversion of funds. Various institutions and individuals have been affected by corruption, including government ministries, parastatals, the police, and politicians. The mining sector has also been plagued by corruption, with officials accepting bribes to award contracts.

== Colonial period ==
Corruption during Malawi's colonial times was prevalent and took various forms as the British colonial powers exploited Malawi's resources and perpetuated corrupt practices, including embezzlement, bribery, nepotism, abuse of power, and exploitation of resources. Colonial officials misappropriated public funds and resources for personal gain, accepted bribes from locals and foreign businesses in exchange for favors and contracts, and favored their own kin and cronies in awarding contracts and positions. They used their authority to accumulate wealth and influence, and exploited Malawi's natural resources, such as land, minerals, and labor, without fair compensation or regard for local welfare. Colonial powers suppressed any opposition or dissent, often using coercion and intimidation. This corruption enriched colonial powers while impoverishing Malawians, perpetuating economic and social inequalities that persist today. The legacy of colonial corruption continues to impact Malawi's development and governance.

== Corruption scandals ==
=== Land grab scandal ===
One notable example of corruption in Malawi's colonial era is the land grab scandal involving British colonial officials and settlers. The land grab scandal in Malawi during the British colonial era was a widespread and systematic appropriation of land from indigenous communities by British colonial officials and settlers. In the late 19th and early 20th centuries, British colonial officials and settlers arrived in Malawi, then known as Nyasaland, with the British South Africa Company (BSAC) leading the colonization efforts. The BSAC was granted a charter by the British government to exploit the region's natural resources and establish colonial rule. To facilitate their colonization, the British colonial officials and settlers embarked on a large-scale land grab, forcibly taking land from local communities, including the Chewa, Ngonde, and Tumbuka tribes.

The land was then allocated to British settlers, who established farms, plantations, and estates. The grab was facilitated by various means, including forced removals, coercive treaties, and land expropriation. Local communities were forcibly removed from their ancestral lands, often under the pretext of "development" or "progress". British officials coerced local chiefs into signing treaties that ceded large tracts of land to the British. The colonial government simply took land without compensation or consent from the local communities. The grab had devastating consequences for the local communities, including displacement, loss of livelihoods, and cultural destruction.

Thousands of people were displaced from their ancestral lands, leading to social, cultural, and economic disruption. Local communities lost their means of livelihood, as their land was taken over by British settlers. The grab led to the destruction of cultural heritage sites, including ancestral graves and sacred lands.

=== Sir Harry Johnston ===
Sir Harry Johnston, the British Commissioner for Central Africa, was accused of acquiring large tracts of land for himself and his friends, including the British South Africa Company.

=== Sir Alfred Sharpe ===
Sir Alfred Sharpe, the Resident Commissioner of Nyasaland (now Malawi), was involved in the illegal allocation of land to European settlers, leading to the displacement of local communities. The British South Africa Company, led by Cecil Rhodes, was granted vast concessions and land grants, which were later used to exploit Malawi's natural resources.

The colonial administration also imposed forced labor and land expropriation on local communities, leading to widespread resentment and resistance. The Ngonde Land Case in 1904 saw the British colonial administration forcibly take land from the Ngonde people, leading to protests and resistance.

The Chilembwe uprising in 1915 saw Malawians, led by John Chilembwe, protest against forced labor, land expropriation, and other forms of colonial exploitation, leading to a violent crackdown by colonial authorities.

=== Kamuzu Banda ===
Kamuzu Banda, the Malawi's first president, ruled from 1964 to 1994 and was notorious for corruption and authoritarianism. He swindled public funds, amassing vast personal wealth, and abused his power to accumulate more wealth and influence through forced labor and land expropriation.

Banda favored family members and close associates, granting them lucrative contracts and positions, and accepted bribes from foreign companies and individuals in exchange for favors and contracts. He used state-owned enterprises like the Agricultural Development and Marketing Corporation (ADMARC) for personal gain and seized land from smallholder farmers, allocating it to himself and loyalists.

His regime was marked by widespread human rights abuses, including forced labor, torture, and political imprisonment. These corruption scandals and abuses of power characterized Banda's rule, perpetuating poverty and inequality in Malawi. His regime's legacy continues to impact the country's development and governance.

=== Bakili Muluzi ===
Bakili Muluzi, who was Malawi's second republican president from 1994 to 2004, was involved in several corruption scandals during his rule. He was accused of siphoning off millions of dollars in public funds into his personal accounts in the Muluzi Gate scandal. The Muluzi Gate scandal involved former Muluzi, who was accused of diverting $12 million in donations to his personal bank account. He was arrested in 2006 and faced trial, but the case was eventually dropped in 2021 due to lack of progress and alleged political interference.

In his rule, he allegedly used his position to enrich himself and his allies through corrupt deals in the Bingu Wa Mutharika Trust scandal.

He was also accused of spending funds meant for low-cost housing projects through the Malawi Housing Corporation scandal. Additionally, Muluzi allegedly used the Agricultural Development and Marketing Corporation (ADMARC) to enrich himself and his allies through corrupt practices. He was further accused of awarding lucrative road construction contracts to companies linked to his allies and family members in the Road Construction scandal.

=== Bingu wa Mutharika ===
Bingu wa Mutharika, the former President of Malawi, was heavily involved in corruption scandals during his rule from 2004 to 2012. He was accused of treason for attempting to amend the constitution to prolong his stay in power. He was also accused of ordering the murder of presidential candidate Robert Chasowa.

Mutharika was also accused of corruption and nepotism, awarding government contracts to his friends and family, and accepting bribes, as well as abusing his office, using his position for personal gain, including the use of public funds for his own benefit. Additionally, he was accused of suppressing political dissent, including the arrest and intimidation of opposition leaders and activists. His regime was marked by economic mismanagement, including a severe foreign exchange shortage and a plummeting currency. The corruption scandals and abuses of power lead to widespread poverty, inequality, and economic stagnation in Malawi.

== See also ==
- Crime in Malawi
- International Anti-Corruption Academy
- Group of States Against Corruption
- International Anti-Corruption Day
- United Nations Convention against Corruption
