= Grace Malera =

Malawian lawyer

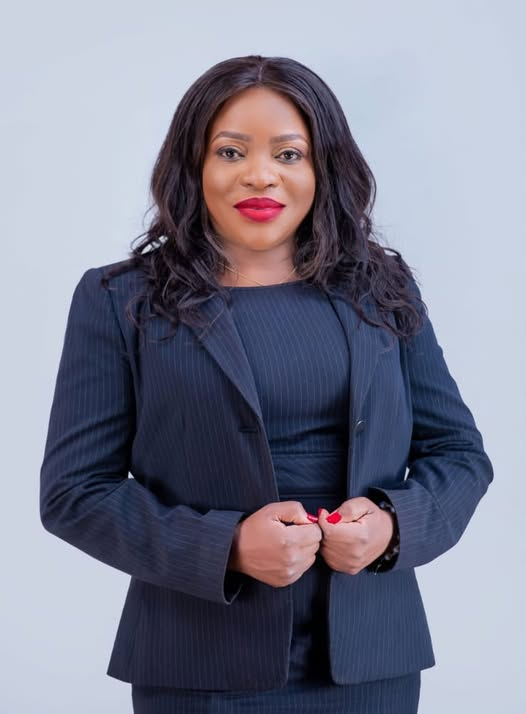
- Malawi Human Rights Commission image from 2021
- Born: 8 May 1978 (age 48)
- Other name: Grace Tikambenji Malera
- Education: University of Malawi, University of the Free State
- Occupation: Ombudsman
- Predecessor: Martha Chizuma

Grace Tikambenji Malera (born 8 May 1978) is a Malawian lawyer who became the Ombudsman in Malawi in 2021.

== Life ==
Malera was born in 1978, and she was one of the daughters born to Rosalia-Janet and Dr. Willie Lipato.

She took her first degree at the University of Malawi and she obtained her master's degree in South Africa at the University of the Free State.

In 2002 she was called to the bar and she went to work for the Anti-Corruption Bureau (ACB) as a prosecution officer.

In 2016 she left her position of executive secretary of the Malawi Human Rights Commission to become the executive director of Action Aid Malawi International. She worked for the Violence Against Women and Girls – Prevention and Response Programme from 2019 to 2021.

She succeeded Martha Chizuma in August 2021. Chizuma had been the first woman to be Malawi's Ombudsman. Chizuma went on the lead the Anti-Corruption Bureau (ACB).

On 2022 the President sacked his Minister of Agriculture and his deputy over the loss of K750 million from the Affordable Inputs Programme which was intended to subsidise subsistence farming. Malera's report in 2024 recommended prosecution of public officials involved in the fraudulent contract made with Bakaart Foods Limited. She said that fraud continued and forensic audits should take place of the funds operation. Her report was welcomed by the Agriculture Minister Sam Kawale.

Chizuma had some issues as the Anti-Corruption Bureau Director and her contract was not renewed in 2024. The Deputy Director General Hillary Chilomba was made the Acting Director General from 5 June 2024. The interview process had to be restarted after it was discovered by Malera and her Office of the Ombudsman that two people on the ACB's shortlist (including Chiloma), failed to meet the criteria required for the position.

Malera presented a 200 page report, in July 2026, that described an investigation into Malawi's Department of Immigration and Citizenship Services. She concluded that weak leadership and corruption had resulted in it "being sold to the highest bidder".

== Private life ==
Malera is a Catholic, and she and her husband have three children.
