= Silvester Ayuba James =

Malawian lawyer and politician

Member of Parliament for Nkhotakota Central Constituency
- Incumbent
- Assumed office 27 October 2025

Personal details
- Party: Malawi Congress Party
- Education: University of Malawi
- Occupation: Lawyer, politician
- Known for: Political commentary, and public controversies

Silvester Ayuba James is a Malawian lawyer and politician. He came to national attention through his legal practice, his election as the Member of Parliament for Nkhotakota Central Constituency, and a series of public statements and controversies that have drawn widespread media coverage. His career has included service on public boards, outspoken political commentary, and disciplinary proceedings before the Malawi Law Society.

== Legal career ==
James has practiced law in Malawi, representing clients in civil and criminal matters.

His work as a lawyer has been the subject of significant public attention due to disciplinary action taken by the Malawi Law Society (MLS). In 2023, the MLS Disciplinary Committee found James guilty in connection with a complaint involving the misappropriation of approximately K11.3 million belonging to a client. The committee alleged that he deposited client funds into a personal bank account rather than a designated client trust account. The disciplinary body recommended that he be struck off the roll of legal practitioners and further advised that the Director of Public Prosecutions open a criminal case. James was also ordered to refund the funds and pay costs associated with the disciplinary process.

Some legal commentators questioned whether permanent disbarment was an appropriate penalty, arguing that the proposed punishment was excessively harsh.

== Political career ==
James was elected Member of Parliament for Nkhotakota Central, defeating several candidates in what was described by media as a notable electoral upset. His participation in national politics has been marked by outspoken positions on constitutional and governance issues.

James has proposed various political reforms, including extending Malawi's general election cycle from five years to eight years. His comments on governance have attracted substantial national debate. He has frequently used media platforms to express views on political and social issues, including criticism of public finance management and national surveys. In early 2025, a social media post attributed to James called for harsh measures against street-connected children suspected of vandalism, including the use of lethal force. Child rights advocates and members of the public condemned the statement, leading to widespread debate and media scrutiny.

In November 2025, James publicly stated in a television interview that the Malawi Congress Party (MCP) should not have been blamed for recent governance outcomes. He argued that government decisions had been driven by individuals close to President Lazarus Chakwera, including church-linked groups rather than by the party's leadership, asserting that MCP had not been the one running government recently.

In February 2026, James renewed his criticism of party leadership and again called for the resignation of party president Lazarus Chakwera. In media remarks, he stated that if Chakwera were to continue leading the party into future elections, he should first undergo medical surgery.

== Public appointments ==
In January 2025, James was appointed to the board of the Electricity Supply Corporation of Malawi. His appointment drew attention due to his simultaneous involvement in high-profile political and legal controversies.
