= Lingalireni Mihowa =

- Education: University of Malawi, Leeds Beckett University
- Employer: Oxfam
- Known for: Malawi Human Rights Commissioner

Lingalireni Mihowa became a Malawian human rights commissioner in 2026. She had been Oxfam's director in Malawi.

== Life ==
She graduated in Social Sciences from the University of Malawi, before she completed her master's degree in Leadership and Change Management at Leeds Beckett University.

In 2012 Mihowa joined an International Visitor Leadership Program in the USA. She was later an adviser to former President Joyce Banda.

She had worked for Oxfam for over a decade in Malawi and Papua New Guinea when she was chosen as Oxfam's director in Malawi in 2019. In 2020 she handed over 300 bicycles to Mary Navicha and Aisha Adams. The women's caucus of 45 women MPs distributed the bikes to volunteers and helpers trying to reduce gender based violence. In 2024, Mihowa was the chair of the board of the National Initiative for Civic Education (NICE) when it secured 3.5 million euro from the government and the European Union to raise awareness among voters prior to the 2025 election.

Mihowa was among those calling for women to be presidential running mates in future elections in 2025. She noted that 600 women had shown some interest in becoming members of Malawian parliament and she supported the government's target of having 35% women in the next parliament. However she acknowledged that there were "Entrenched Patriarchal Structures" holding back progress.

Mihowa has served on the boards of the Malawi Scotland Partnership, the Lilongwe Water Board, the Civil Society Organizations Nutrition Alliance (CSONA) and as a trustee of the parastatal Lilongwe Water Board and the National Initiative for Civic Education.

In September 2026 she was included when a new consort of Malawi's Human Rights commissioners was announced. The others were journalist Teresa Ndaga, Orison Joseph Themba Chapond, Viwemi Chavula, Godfrey Dalitso Kangaude, Andrew Kavala and Stella Nkhonya. The nine strong commission is completed by the Law Commissioner and the Ombudsman.
