= Scader Louis =

Scader Louis, ex Chairperson of the Malawian Human Rights Commission

Scader Louis is a former Malawian Human Rights Commission Chairperson. Louis is the founder of the Spinal Injuries Association of Malawi (SIAM), which she founded in 2011, and has published articles about disability in Malawi.

== Life ==
Louis's father died when she was aged 12, and her mother died as she was about to enter secondary school. Her school was run by Catholic nuns who took her in. Despite doing well at school, she had two dependent brothers and was unable to proceed to university. She started working at the charity World Vision International, while studying simultaneously at Malawi College of Accountancy. In 2004 a minibus accident left her with permanent spinal injuries and confined to a wheelchair.

In 2010 Louis became a chartered accountant. She was the founding member of the Spinal Injuries Association in 2011. She was identified as one of Malawi's Human Rights Commissioners in 2019. President Mutharika appointed her to the 7th cohort of human rights commissioners, along with Dr Sunduzwayo Madise, Boniface Massa, Dr Bertha Sefu, and Stella Twea. Membership of the commission was completed by the Law Commissioner and Ombudsman Martha Chizuma. She became the Commission's chairperson and completed her tenure for this position in 2026.

She has continued to work at World Vision as a risk and compliance manager.

In 2026 her organisation was organising week long courses for those who had who cared for people with spinal injuries. The course was particularly aimed at those who had recently had the injury.
