= Juuko =

Juuko is both a given name and a surname. Notable people with the name include:

- Juuko of Buganda, Kabaka of Buganda
- Anne Juuko (born c. 1981), Ugandan banker
- Justin Juuko (born 1972), Ugandan boxer
- Murushid Juuko (born 1994), Ugandan footballer
- Safia Juuko Nalule (born 1966), Ugandan activist
