= Chikondi Chijozi =

- in 2026
- Born: 24 December 1984 (age 41)
- Education: University of Sussex and Chancellor College
- Occupation: human rights lawyer
- Employer: Malawi Human Rights Commission
- Known for: Malawi's Human Rights Commissioner

Chikondi Chijozi (born 24 December 1984) is a lawyer. She was a Human Rights commissioner in Malawi from 2021 to 2026.

== Early life and education ==
Chijozi is the first-born in a family of four children that include her twin. She obtained a Bachelor of Laws (Hons) from Chancellor College at the University of Malawi. She later earned a Master of Laws in International Human Rights Law from the University of Sussex in the United Kingdom.

== Career ==
Chijozi began her legal career in 2004 as a paralegal officer with the Paralegal Advisory Service. In 2006, she was among a group of 12 paralegals who founded the Centre for Human Rights, Education, Advice and Assistance (CHREAA), where she eventually served as Deputy Executive Director and Litigation Manager.

Her CHREAA and the Southern Africa Litigation Centre (SALC) supported Mayeso Gwanda who had been charged with being "a rogue and a vagabond". He was trying to sell plastic bags in Blantyre, but this arbitrary law was applied to him. This was a British colonial law that existed in several countries. In 2017 the High Court agreed that the law was unconstitutional because it ignored Masyeso Gwanda's "rights to dignity, freedom of movement, and security of person."

She later joined the Southern Africa Litigation Centre (SALC), where she serves as the Criminal Justice Lead. In this role, she has been a prominent advocate for prison law reform and the rights of marginalized groups, including prisoners, women, and the LGBTQ+ community. She is a frequent commentator on legal issues and has been interviewed by outlets such as SABC News regarding judicial developments in Southern Africa.

=== Malawi Human Rights Commission ===
In 2019 she was overlooked by the President after she was nominated to be a Human Rights Commissioner. This was against the constitution. Chijozi was appointed as commissioner for the Malawi Human Rights Commission (MHRC) in 2021. In 2023, she was reappointed by President Lazarus Chakwera as part of the commission's eighth cohort. On 25 October 2023, she was elected Chairperson of the MHRC, succeeding the late Reverend Patrick Semphere. In that year she met Amal Clooney at a legal advice centre based in a tent in the Mchinji District. The Clooney Foundation fund Malawi's Women Lawyers Association who supply legal support to women in rural areas.

In January 2026 she raised concern about the use of Presidential pardon. The debate arose of six police officers convicted of murder were pardoned. She said that it needs "urgent reform to protect human rights, accountability, and victims."

In early 2026, Chijozi led the commission in condemning the "barbaric" desecration of the grave of Mausamatha Zacharia, a person with albinism. The grave had been disturbed and the deceased's arms removed, as act linked to persistent superstitions regarding the use of body parts in ritual magic. Chijozi called for greater protection for vulnerable groups and stricter enforcement against those targeting people with albinism.
