= Crime in Malawi =

Malawi
- Crime rates* (2023)

Violent crimes
- Homicide: 2.3
- Rape: 20
- Robbery: 16.1
- Aggravated assault: 68.1
- Total violent crime: 70.9

Property crimes
- Burglary: 109.8
- Motor vehicle theft: 23.7
- Arson: 11.6
- Total property crime: 265.8
- Notes *Number of reported crimes per 100,000 population. Estimated total population: 21,240,689.

Southeast African nation of Malawi has a complicated criminal history that is a reflection of its political, economic, and cultural environment. Although crime in Malawi dates back to pre-colonial times, it wasn't until the colonial era that it started to pose a serious threat.

Malawi witnessed a remarkable decline in homicide rates between 2006 and 2012, plummeting from 6.3 to 1.8 per 100,000 people, a staggering 70% reduction. Additionally, the Lilongwe Model Police Station saw a consistent decrease in arrests from 2017 to 2020, but this trend was disrupted in 2021 due to increased arrests related to COVID-19 regulations and sweeping exercises. Furthermore, data from the World Prison Brief reveals that the proportion of prisoners to the general population reached its peak in 2006, indicating a significant improvement in the country's safety and security landscape over the years.

Malawians' perceptions of crime and security, as reflected in Afrobarometer surveys, present a mixed picture. While the percentage of respondents who considered crime and security a top priority decreased from about 7% in 2005 to about 6.3% in 2019, suggesting a perceived improvement in the situation, other survey findings contradict this trend, indicating a more complex and nuanced situation.

== History ==
=== Colonial period ===
Certain customs were made illegal when the British colonized Malawi and imposed their legal system on the country. As a result, there was tension between the native populace and the colonial authorities, which increased crime.

=== Independence ===
Following its independence in 1964, Malawi had to deal with a number of new issues, such as political instability, corruption, and poverty. Property crimes, violent crimes, public order crimes, cybercrimes, drug-related crimes, environmental crimes, and political crimes were among the crimes that increased as a result of the factors.

Vagrancy, loitering, and disorderly conduct are examples of public order crimes that frequently target marginalized communities. White-collar crimes include fraud, embezzlement, and corruption that affect officials in government and business. Cyberbullying, online fraud, and hacking are examples of the newly emerging cybercrimes. The illegal drug trade is connected to drug-related crimes, such as drug possession and trafficking. Malawi's natural resources are in danger due to environmental crimes such as pollution, poaching, and deforestation. Elections and political unrest are frequently associated with political crimes, such as treason, sedition, and political violence.

Every kind of crime has distinct traits and effects on Malawian society. For example, young people pursuing financial gain or status symbols are frequently the ones committing property crimes. Men commit violent crimes against women and children on a regular basis, which is a reflection of ingrained gender prejudices. Street vendors and sex workers are among the marginalized groups disproportionately affected by public order crimes. White-collar crimes erode public confidence in institutions and take funds away from vital public services. Cybercrimes take advantage of holes in Malawi's quickly expanding digital infrastructure. Drug-related offenses exacerbate addiction, health issues, and dissolutions in families. Malawi's sustainable development and biodiversity are at risk due to environmental crimes. Political crimes have the power to erode democratic progress and destabilize the nation.

Despite the seemingly improved perception of crime and security, a closer look at the Afrobarometer survey results reveals a more concerning trend. Between 2005 and 2014, there was a significant 9-point rise in respondents reporting theft and physical attacks on family members. Furthermore, the proportion of Malawians dissatisfied with the government's efforts to combat crime surged from about 46% in 2005 to about 63.3% in 2019, indicating a growing discontent with the handling of crime and security issues.

The police selectively release crime statistics, only sharing quarterly figures when it benefits them, which is insufficient for understanding trends. They often neglect to consider crucial factors like population growth, political climate, and underreporting, which can significantly impact crime rates. Alarmingly, the reporting rates for crimes are low, with only 17% of assaults reported in 2004-2005 and 36% of all crimes reported in 2012, according to the census and Afrobarometer survey respectively. This incomplete data makes it challenging to accurately assess crime trends in Malawi.

== Types of crimes and their incidents ==
=== Crimes against the person ===
==== Violence ====
In 2018, a young woman was brutally attacked and left for dead by her ex-boyfriend. The victim, a university student, had ended the relationship, but the perpetrator couldn't accept it. He stalked her, attacked her with a machete, and left her with severe injuries. The case sparked outrage, highlighting the need to address gender-based violence and protect victims. In 2015, a violent incident occurred in Mzuzu, where a group of youths attacked a rival group, leaving several injured and one dead. The violence was sparked by a longstanding feud between the groups, highlighting the need for community interventions to address youth violence.

In 2012, a shocking incident happened in Zomba, where a woman was attacked and burned alive by her husband. The perpetrator, a businessman, had a history of domestic violence. He doused his wife with petrol and set her alight, leaving her with severe burns. The case sparked widespread condemnation, highlighting the need for stronger laws to protect victims of domestic violence.

==== Infanticide ====
Malawi has experienced its share of infanticide cases, each one a tragic reminder of the need for support and protection for vulnerable mothers and children. In 2020, a young mother in Ntcheu was arrested for throwing her three-day-old baby into a pit latrine. The mother, who was reportedly struggling with mental health issues, had been abandoned by her husband and left to care for the child alone. The case highlighted the need for improved mental health services and support for new mothers.

In 2016, another was charged with murdering her newly born baby. The mother, who was reportedly experiencing economic difficulties, had been struggling to care for her child. The case emphasized the need for increased support for struggling families and access to resources for vulnerable mothers.

In 2013, a woman was arrested for strangling her two-week-old baby in Machinga. The mother, who had a history of depression, had been experiencing postpartum psychosis. The case highlighted the need for improved postnatal care and mental health services for new mothers.

In 2022, a 15-year-old girl was in police custody in Lilongwe at the Lilongwe Police Station for allegedly killing of her one-month-old baby in Katunga Village in TA Njewa.

==== Human trafficking ====
Malawi has been facing rise in human trafficking with many victims being women and children since the early 2000s. In 2024, a 32-year-old Malawian woman, Georgina, was tricked into working as a maid in Sultanate of Oman with promises of a better life. Instead, she was subjected to physical and sexual abuse, forced to work long hours, and had her passport taken away. She managed to reach out for help through a Facebook post, which was seen by a social media activist user, Pililani Mombe Nyoni, in the US. The activist helped Georgina and soon discovered that many other Malawian women in Oman were facing similar situations. A WhatsApp group was formed, and over 50 women shared their harrowing experiences, including physical and sexual abuse, and being trapped without their passports. The group became a vital resource for the women to seek help and support. The story highlights the widespread human trafficking and abuse faced by female domestic workers in the Arab's Gulf states.

In 2018, another trafficking trade was uncovered between China and Malawi, where young women and girls as young as 14 were being sold into sex slavery and forced marriages. Traffickers in Malawi coerced vulnerable families to sell their daughters, promising a better life in China. However, the brides were subjected to physical and emotional abuse, and some were forced into prostitution. The Platform for Investigative Journalism in Malawi exposed the syndicate, sharing the heart-wrenching story of Ethel Moyo, who was forced into marriage with a Chinese man despite being underage. The UN was aware of the issue, but the Malawian government claimed ignorance. The Chinese Embassy in Malawi had not commented, but China had engaged Interpol on the matter. The trade was illegal under Malawi's Constitution and international law, and victims were being warned against seeking help.

In 2022, a 26-year-old Chinese national, Lu Ke, was charged with human trafficking in Malawi after allegedly exploiting and filming children singing racist chants. He was arrested in Zambia after fleeing Malawi and extradited back to face charges. Lu Ke was accused of selling the videos on Chinese social media and faced five counts of trafficking in persons, with more charges expected. He was denied bail due to being a flight risk and the risk of interfering with minor witnesses. The Chinese embassy in Malawi condemned Lu Ke's actions, stating that the Chinese government had zero tolerance for racism.

The Malawian government has taken steps to combat human trafficking, including enacting the Trafficking in Persons Act in 2015. The law criminalizes human trafficking and provides protection and support for victims. The government has also established a National Task Force on Human Trafficking, which includes various stakeholders working together to prevent trafficking and support victims.

The general public has also played a crucial role in combating human trafficking. Many organizations, such as the Malawi Network Against Trafficking (MNAT), have been established to raise awareness and support victims. MNAT has worked tirelessly to identify victims, provide counseling and support, and advocate for stronger laws and policies.

In addition, community members have been instrumental in reporting suspected cases of human trafficking, leading to numerous arrests and rescues. The public's increased awareness and engagement have helped to reduce the prevalence of human trafficking in Malawi.

=== Property crimes ===
Property crimes, such as burglary, theft, and robbery, are often driven by economic necessity in Malawi. Violent crimes, such as assault, murder, and sexual offenses, are often linked to alcohol abuse and gender inequality.

==== Money laundering ====
Money laundering, a serious economic crime, involves concealing illicit funds to make them appear legitimate. Malawi has faced its share of money laundering cases, often linked to corruption, fraud, and organized crime.

In 2019, a high-profile case emerged in Lilongwe, where former Minister of Energy, Newton Kambala, was arrested for laundering millions of dollars in bribes from a foreign company. Kambala had used shell companies and fake invoices to disguise the funds, which were meant to finance public projects. The case sparked outrage and calls for greater transparency in government dealings.

In 2017, a prominent businessman, Osward Lutepo, was arrested for laundering millions of dollars in connection with the controversial "Cashgate" scandal, in which government officials and businessmen conspired to steal public funds. Lutepo had used his companies to launder the funds, which were meant to finance public projects.

The Malawian government has taken steps to combat money laundering, including enacting the Money Laundering, Proceeds of Crime and Terrorist Financing Act in 2017. The law criminalizes money laundering and requires financial institutions to report suspicious transactions. The government has also established the Financial Intelligence Unit, which investigates and analyzes suspicious transactions.

Citizens have played a vital role in exposing money laundering schemes, with many individuals reporting suspicious activities to the authorities. Civil society organizations, such as the Malawi chapter of the Global Coalition Against Corruption, have also been instrumental in advocating for stronger laws and greater transparency.

In response to public pressure, the government has increased its efforts to prosecute money laundering cases and recover illicit funds. The judiciary has handed down significant sentences to those convicted of money laundering, and the government has established a dedicated asset recovery bureau to manage seized assets.

For instance, in 2020, the High Court sentenced former Minister Ralph Kasambara to 10 years in prison for money laundering and ordered him to pay a fine of $1 million. Similarly, in 2019, the court sentenced businessman Lutepo to 7 years in prison for money laundering and ordered him to pay a fine of $500,000.

==== Stock theft ====
Malawi has struggled with stock theft, with many cases reported in rural areas. For instance, in 2019, a notable incident occurred in the rural district of Mchinji, where a group of thieves stole 20 head of cattle worth millions of kwacha from a local farmer, Mr. Chipoka. The thieves were later caught and arrested, but not before they had sold some of the cattle to unsuspecting buyers. In 2018, a similar incident happened in the district of Ntchisi, where a farmer, Mr. Kachaje, lost 15 goats to stock thieves. The thieves were traced to neighboring Mozambique, where they were arrested and the goats recovered. The Malawian government has taken steps to combat stock theft, including enacting the Stock Theft Act in 2017. The law imposes harsh penalties on those convicted of stock theft, including imprisonment and fines. The government has also established a special task force to investigate and prosecute stock theft cases.

The government has also established a national livestock identification program to trace and identify stolen livestock. The program uses ear tags and microchips to mark livestock, making it easier to identify and recover stolen animals. In addition, the government has established a compensation scheme for farmers who lose livestock to stock theft. The scheme provides financial assistance to farmers to help them replace their stolen livestock.

=== Cybercrimes ===
==== Hacking ====
Hacking, a serious cybercrime, involves unauthorized access to computer systems or networks, causing harm to individuals and organizations. Malawi has experienced its share of hacking incidents, highlighting the need for improved cybersecurity measures.

In 2023, the International Press Institute (IPI) commended the release of Malawian journalist Macmillan Mhone, who was arrested on cybercrime charges in April. Mhone faced charges related to a story exposing alleged corruption and fraud by businessman Abdul Karim Batatwala. The IPI urged authorities to drop the charges and prevent the cybercrime law from being misused against journalists. The organization expressed concern about the growing trend of using cybercrime laws to silence critical journalists and stifling press freedom. While Mhone's release on bail was a positive development, the IPI emphasized the need for Malawi to respect media freedom and cease harassing journalists for doing their job, aligning its cybercrime law with regional and international press freedom standards.

In 2024 February, President Lazarus Chakwera revealed that Malawi's immigration department had been hacked, resulting in a ransom demand. He refused to pay, calling it a "serious national security breach." The hack caused a two-week suspension of passport issuance, leaving many frustrated. Chakwera ordered a temporary solution within three weeks and a long-term solution with enhanced security measures. This is not the first passport-related issue in Malawi, with past problems including a shortage of booklets and alleged corruption. The hack's details and implications for personal data security remain undisclosed.

In 2019, a significant hacking incident occurred at the Malawi Revenue Authority (MRA), where hackers gained access to the authority's computer system and stole millions of kwacha in tax payments. The incident compromised sensitive taxpayer information and disrupted revenue collection.

In 2018, a group of hackers targeted the National Bank of Malawi, gaining access to customer accounts and stealing large sums of money. The incident prompted the bank to tighten its security measures and compensate affected customers.

In 2017, a young hacker, identified as Emmanuel Phiri, was arrested for hacking into the website of the Malawi Communications Regulatory Authority (MACRA). Phiri had used his skills to expose vulnerabilities in the website's security system.

The Malawian government has taken steps to combat hacking, including enacting the Electronic Transactions and Cyber Security Act in 2017. The law criminalizes hacking and imposes penalties on those convicted.

The government has also established a cyber security unit within the Malawi Police Service to investigate and prosecute hacking cases. Additionally, the government has implemented measures to improve cybersecurity in public institutions and has launched public awareness campaigns to educate citizens about online safety.

Many individuals and organizations have invested in cybersecurity measures, such as firewalls and antivirus software, to protect their systems and data.

==== Cyberbullying ====
Cyberbullying in Malawi highlights the need for increased awareness and action. In 2019, a disturbing incident occurred when a secondary school student, Mercy Phiri, was cyberbullied on social media by her classmates. The bullies created a fake account in Mercy's name and shared embarrassing posts and images, causing her significant emotional distress. The incident prompted the school to take action, and the bullies were disciplined.

In 2018 and 2024, a popular musician, Tay Grin, was cyberbullied on social media by a rival musician, who spread false rumors and insults about him. The incident sparked a national conversation about cyberbullying and the need for greater accountability on social media platforms.

The Malawian government has taken steps to combat cyberbullying, including enacting the Electronic Transactions and Cyber Security Act in 2017. The law criminalizes cyberbullying and imposes penalties on those convicted.

The government has also established a cybercrime unit within the Malawi Police Service to investigate and prosecute cyberbullying cases. Additionally, the government has launched public awareness campaigns to educate citizens about the harmful effects of cyberbullying and the importance of responsible social media use.

Locals have played a crucial role in reporting cyberbullying incidents and supporting victims. Many individuals and organizations have come forward to share their experiences and raise awareness about the issue.

==== Online fraud ====
Online fraud has been one of Malawi's challenges with its share of online fraud incidents, highlighting the need for increased vigilance and action.

In 2019, a sophisticated online fraud scheme was uncovered, involving a group of criminals who posed as representatives of a reputable bank. They created a fake website and social media accounts, convincing victims to reveal sensitive financial information and transfer large sums of money to fraudulent accounts. The scheme, dubbed "Operation Kaya," was estimated to have defrauded over 1,000 individuals of millions of kwacha.

In 2018, a prominent businessperson, Dr. Thomson Mpinganjira, was arrested and charged with online fraud after allegedly swindling investors out of millions of kwacha through a fake investment scheme. The scheme, which promised unusually high returns, was advertised on social media and targeted unsuspecting investors.

In 2017, a group of online fraudsters targeted the Malawi Government's agricultural subsidy program, stealing millions of kwacha by creating fake accounts and claiming non-existent subsidies. The incident led to a nationwide audit of the program and the arrest of several suspects.

The Malawian government has taken steps to combat online fraud, including enacting the Electronic Transactions and Cyber Security Act in 2017. The law criminalizes online fraud and imposes harsh penalties on those convicted.

The government has also established a cybercrime unit within the Malawi Police Service to investigate and prosecute online fraud cases. Additionally, the government has launched public awareness campaigns to educate citizens about the dangers of online fraud and the importance of online safety.

=== Environmental crimes ===
==== Deforestation ====
Deforestation involves the clearance of forests without permission, causing harm to the environment and wildlife. Malawi has struggled with deforestation, leading to soil erosion, loss of biodiversity, and water scarcity.

In 2023, the Daily Maverick published an article about the Michiru Forest in Malawi which suffered significant destruction, losing over 1,904 hectares of land, including indigenous tree species and biodiversity. The Southern Crowned Hornbill, a vulnerable species, had not been spotted in recent years. The forest's destruction also impacted tourism. Despite Malawi's commitment to restore 4.5 million of degraded forests hectares by the year 2030, the country's green spaces had been disappearing at a high speed, with 7.8 million of land degraded hectares. The Wildlife and Environmental Society of Malawi (WESM) called for urgent action, working with government agencies, local communities, and launching a petition to raise awareness and secure financial support for forest rehabilitation and management. WESM emphasized the need for collective efforts to save Michiru Forest for future generations.

In 2017, a group of villagers in the Thyolo District were arrested for deforestation and illegal charcoal production. The villagers had cleared a large area of forest to produce charcoal, causing significant environmental damage. The incident highlighted the need for sustainable livelihoods and alternative energy sources.

The Malawian government has taken steps to combat deforestation, including enacting the Forest Act in 2017. The law criminalizes deforestation and imposes harsh penalties on those convicted.

The government has also established a special task force to investigate and prosecute deforestation cases. Additionally, the government has launched public awareness campaigns to educate citizens about the importance of conservation and sustainable use of natural resources.

==== Pollution ====
Malawi has struggled with pollution, particularly in its urban centers and industrial areas. In 2019, a devastating pollution incident occurred in the capital city of Lilongwe, where a private company, Blue Circle Industries, was found to be releasing toxic chemicals into the nearby river. The chemicals contaminated the water supply, affecting thousands of residents. The company's owner, James Mwangulu, was arrested and charged with pollution and criminal negligence.

In 2019 September, a group of people were was found to be generating massive amounts of plastic waste, which was not being disposed of properly in Lake Malawi. The market vendors and other locals were educated on proper waste management practices, and the city council implemented new regulations to reduce plastic waste.

In 2017, a group of residents in the town of Kachere, in the Nsanje District, complained of air and water pollution caused by a nearby coal mine. The mine, owned by the government, was releasing harmful pollutants into the air and water, affecting the health of nearby residents. The government was forced to shut down the mine and implement new safety measures to reduce pollution.

The Malawian government has taken steps to combat pollution, including enacting the Environmental Management Act in 2017. The law criminalizes pollution and imposes harsh penalties on those convicted.

==== Poaching ====
Poaching which involves the illegal hunting, killing, or capturing of wild animals, causing harm to biodiversity and ecosystems has been a major problem in Malawi particularly in national parks and game reserves.

In 2023, a group of poachers, led by a notorious criminal, Benson Msiska, killed five elephants and removed their tusks. The incident sparked outrage, and Msiska was arrested and charged with poaching and wildlife trafficking.

In 2018, a famous Chinese businessman, Liu Haijiang, was arrested at the Kamuzu International Airport in Lilongwe, attempting to smuggle rhino horns and elephant tusks out of the country. The incident highlighted the involvement of international criminal syndicates in Malawi's poaching crisis.

In 2017, a group of poachers attacked a ranger station in the Liwonde National Park, killing two rangers and injuring several others. The poachers were attempting to steal rhino horns and elephant tusks. The incident led to a nationwide crackdown on poaching and the deployment of military personnel to protect national parks.

The Malawian government has taken steps to combat poaching, including enacting the Wildlife Act in 2017. The law criminalizes poaching and imposes harsh penalties on those convicted, including life imprisonment.

The government has also established a special task force to investigate and prosecute poaching cases. Additionally, the government has launched public awareness campaigns to educate citizens about the importance of wildlife conservation and the negative impacts of poaching.

=== Drug-related crimes ===
==== Illegal drug trade ====
Illegal drug trade which involves the cultivation, distribution, and possession of illegal drugs, causing harm to individuals and society has been one of the major problem in Malawi affecting youths and adults alike due to the rise of cannabis and heroin trafficking. In 2019, a significant drug bust occurred in the capital city of Lilongwe, where a group of traffickers, led by a notorious criminal, Felix Phiri, were arrested with over 100 kilograms of heroin. The drugs were destined for international markets, and Phiri was sentenced to life imprisonment. In 2018, a popular musician, Lucius Banda, was arrested at the Kamuzu International Airport in Lilongwe, attempting to smuggle cannabis out of the country. The incident highlighted the involvement of celebrities in the illegal drug trade. In 2017, a group of farmers in the Nkhotakota District were arrested for cultivating cannabis on a large scale. The farmers claimed they were unaware of the legal implications, but the incident led to a nationwide crackdown on cannabis cultivation. In 2020, Nigerian nationals were arrested in Malawi for the very cases.

The Malawian government has taken steps to combat the illegal drug trade, including enacting the Drug Act in 2017. The law criminalizes drug trafficking and imposes harsh penalties on those convicted.

==== Drug trafficking and possession ====
In 2021, a group of drug traffickers from West Africa were arrested with illegal drugs in Malawi. The incident highlighted the involvement of business leaders in drug trafficking. In 2018, a celebrity, Mercy Phiri, was arrested in Lilongwe for possessing cannabis. Phiri claimed she was using the drug for medical purposes, but the incident sparked a nationwide debate about drug abuse among celebrities.

In 2017, a group of students at the University of Malawi were arrested for possessing cannabis and heroin. The incident led to a university-wide crackdown on drug abuse, and the students were provided with counseling and support. The Malawian government has taken steps to combat drug trafficking and possession, including enacting the Drug Act in 2017. The law criminalizes drug trafficking and possession and imposes harsh penalties on those convicted. The government has also established a special task force to investigate and prosecute drug-related cases. Additionally, the government has launched public awareness campaigns to educate citizens about the dangers of drug abuse and the negative impacts of drug trafficking.

=== Political crimes ===
==== Treason ====
Treason has been one of Malawi's political problems linked to political instability and power struggles. In 2019, a notable incident occurred when a group of military officers, led by Colonel Felix Jolobala, attempted a coup against the government of President Peter Mutharika. The plot was foiled, and Jolobala was arrested and charged with treason. The incident highlighted the threat of military intervention in politics. In 2018, a prominent opposition leader, Reverend Moses Mkandawire, was arrested and charged with treason for allegedly plotting against the government. Mkandawire claimed the charges were politically motivated, and the incident sparked a nationwide debate about political persecution.

In 2017, a group of individuals were arrested for attempting to assassinate President Mutharika. The plot was linked to a political rival, and the incident led to a nationwide crackdown on political violence.

The Malawian government has taken steps to combat treason, including enacting the Treason Act in 2017. The law criminalizes acts of treason and imposes harsh penalties on those convicted. The government has also established a special task force to investigate and prosecute cases of treason. Additionally, the government has launched public awareness campaigns to educate citizens about the importance of national security and stability. The general public has played a crucial role in reporting suspected cases of treason and demanding action from the authorities. Many individuals and organizations have come forward to raise awareness about the issue and support anti-treason efforts. For instance, in 2020, a local NGO, the Malawi Patriots Association (MPA), launched a campaign to promote national unity and stability. The campaign aimed to educate citizens about the dangers of treason and promote peaceful political participation.

==== Sedition ====
Malawi has been facing some serious seditions that includes acts of incitement or conspiracy against the government or state. In 2019, a notable incident occurred when a prominent activist, Boniface Massah, was arrested and charged with sedition for allegedly inciting protests against the government. Massah claimed the charges were politically motivated, and the incident sparked a nationwide debate about freedom of speech.

In 2009, leaders of the opposition United Democratic Front (UDF) party in Malawi were arrested and charged with sedition after releasing a recording allegedly featuring President Bingu Wa Mutharika ordering the harassment of former President Bakili Muluzi. UDF spokesman Sam Mpasu was also arrested and charged with sedition in connection with the recording. The party claims the CD was sent anonymously and they were surprised by the swift arrest orders from the Minister of Information, Patricia Kaliati, which they believe were politically motivated. Mpasu denies the party's intention was to undermine peace and security, instead emphasizing the need for the rule of law to be respected and enforced by law enforcement agencies, not politicians.

In 2017, a local newspaper editor, George Mnyenyembe, was arrested and charged with sedition for publishing articles critical of the government. Mnyenyembe claimed the charges were an attack on press freedom, and the incident sparked international condemnation.

The Malawian government has taken steps to combat sedition, including enacting the Sedition Act in 2017. The law criminalizes acts of sedition and imposes harsh penalties on those convicted.

The government has also established a special task force to investigate and prosecute cases of sedition. Additionally, the government has launched public awareness campaigns to educate citizens about the importance of national security and stability.

==== Political violence ====
In 2024, supporters of the ruling party and the opposition party clashed in the capital city of Lilongwe, resulting in injuries and property damage. The incident highlighted the threat of political violence in the country.

In 2018, a prominent opposition leader, Lazarus Chakwera, was attacked by suspected ruling party supporters while campaigning in the northern region of the country. Chakwera claimed the attack was politically motivated, and the incident sparked widespread condemnation. In 2017, a group of protesters demanding electoral reforms were violently dispersed by police in Lilongwe, resulting in injuries and arrests. The incident led to a nationwide debate about police brutality and political freedom. The Malawian government has taken steps to combat political violence, including enacting the Political Parties Act in 2018. The law regulates political party conduct and imposes penalties for violent behavior.

=== Public order crimes ===
==== Vagrancy and loitering ====
Vagrancy has been of minor but with big effect in Malawi often linked to poverty and urbanization. In 2019, a notable incident occurred when a group of vagrants were arrested in the capital city of Lilongwe for loitering and begging in public areas. The incident highlighted the need for addressing the root causes of vagrancy. In 2018, a local NGO, the Malawi Street Children Association, reported a rise in the number of street children in major cities, many of whom were engaged in vagrancy. The organization called for increased support for homeless youth.

In 2017, a vagrant was arrested in Blantyre for allegedly stealing from market stalls. The incident sparked a debate about the relationship between vagrancy and criminal behavior. The Malawian government has taken steps to address vagrancy, including establishing rehabilitation programs for homeless individuals and increasing support for low-income families.

==== Disorderly conduct ====
Malawi has been affected by disorderly conduct which involves behaving in a manner that disturbs the peace and tranquility of the community, causing annoyance or alarm to others almost all the time often linked to public intoxication, noise pollution, and disruptive behavior. In 2019, a notable incident occurred when a group of revelers were arrested in the tourist town of Mangochi for engaging in disorderly conduct, including loud noise and public intoxication. The incident highlighted the need for responsible behavior in public spaces.

In 2017, a group of protesters were arrested for disorderly conduct during a demonstration against government policies in the city of Blantyre. The incident led to a nationwide discussion about the balance between free speech and public order.

The Malawian government has taken steps to address disorderly conduct, including enacting the Public Order Act in 2018. The law regulates public behavior and imposes penalties for disorderly conduct.
