= Geoffrey Kapusa =

Malawian television presenter

- Born: 14 September 1971; Zomba, Malawi
- Died: 23 April 2024 (aged 52); Blantyre, Malawi
- Education: Zomba Secondary School
- Alma mater: Bachelor's Degree in Journalism; Blantyre International University
- Occupations: television presenter; radio presenter; master of ceremonies
- Years active: 1990–2024
- Organization: MBC Malawi
- Known for: TV and radio presenting
- Notable work: Music Splash Malawian programme

Geoffrey Kapusa (14 September 1971 – 23 April 2024) was a veteran Malawian television and radio broadcaster and presenter. He was known to have started a television music show called 'Malawi Music Splash' programme on Malawi's MBC state television in early 2000s. He was known as Mr. Splash as a result of his flagship TV music show. Kapusa worked for Malawi Broadcasting Cooperation (MBC) before a brief stint with Times Group.

== Education ==
Kapusa obtained his Bachelor's degree of Journalism from the Blantyre International University in 2007. He attended the Malawi Institute of Journalism where he graduated with a Degree in Journalism.

== Career ==
Kapusa met his friend, Zadziko Mankhambo, in June 1998 during a TV Production and Journalism course organized by UNESCO in preparation for the establishment of TVM that year. In the 2000s, Kapusa started the television music show called 'Malawi Music Splash' programme on MBC in early 2000s and was known as Mr. Splash as a result of his flagship TV music show. In 2017, Kapusa was fired from MBC.

== Death ==
Kapusa died on 23 April 2024 after a long illness. His sister, Yamikani Kapusa, said Kapusa died at Queen Elizabeth Central Hospital in Blantyre. He was buried in Malosa, Zomba.

In reaction to his death, The Media Institute of Southern Africa (MISA) Malawi Chapter described his death as a devastating catastrophe to the Malawi media industry. In an interview with Zodiak, the MISA Malawi Chapter's chairperson, Golden Matonga, described Kapusa as one of the first television celebrities in Malawi.

== Personal life ==
Kapusa was married and lived in Blantyre. He is being survived by 3 daughters namely Claudia, Diana and Elizabeth.

== See also ==
- Malawi Broadcasting Corporation
- Joy Nathu
