= National Initiative for Civic Education =

NICE
- National Initiative for Civic Education
- Formation: 1999; 27 years ago
- Type: Public Trust
- Location: Lilongwe
- Website: nice.mw

The National Initiative for Civic Education aka NICE Public Trust was established in 1999. Its purpose is to improve civic knowledge in Malawi. In 2012 it became a public trust. It has received funding from the European Community.

== History ==
NICE was established in 1999 as a government initiative and it was funded by the European Community.

In June 2006 the European community agreed funds totalling nearly 9 million euros to cover a four-year plan with the government of Malawi. NICE was one part of "Promotion of the Rule of Law and Civic Education in Malawi". The time was later extended so that phase would end in 2010.

In 2012 NICE became a Public Trust.

In 2024 Lingalireni Mihowa was the chair of the board when NICE secured 3.5 million euro from the government and the European Union to raise awareness among voters prior to the 2025 election. NICE's National Training and Planning Workshop was held in February 2024 in Lilongwe. The Ministry of Local Government, National Unity and Culture's Permanent Secretariat, Dr. Elizabeth Gomani Chindebvu, noted that NICE's work showed the government's commitment to transparency and good governance and Chimwemwe Kussein, from the Ministry of Gender, welcomed a manual for aspiring women politicians that NICE had helped develop.

In September 2025, NICE's Executive Director Gray Kalindekafe unveiled an "Election Situation Room" which was designed to receive reports from 1,100 election observers who NICE had trained. The idea was supported by the United Nations Development Programme (UNDP) and was funded by four countries. Justice Annabel Mtalimanja who led the Malawi Electoral Commission (MEC) welcomed what she saw as a complementary system that would help deliver the election's credibility.

The underlying theme of the organisation's message has been questioned. Democracy can be presented as consisting of the population to be actively involved in voting, but democracy can also include protests and demonstrations. The SAGE Handbook of Education for Citizenship and Democracy suspected that only the former interpretation was encouraged.

== Publications ==
Heiko Meinhardt's 2004, Free at Last!: Malawi's Democratic Transition
