= Stella Nkhonya =

- Born: Malawi
- Known for: Disability rights activist and from 2026 a Human Rights Commissioner in Malawi
- Children: two daughters

Stella Nkhonya Chisangwala is a Malawian woman concerned with disability rights. She is a Human Rights Commissioner in Malawi and the executive director of WAG Disability Rights.

== Life ==
Nkhonya was born in a village in northern Malawi. Nkhonya suffered from polio when she was seven. She temporarily lost the use of her hands and her legs were permanently paralysed. Her parents ignored those who advised that education was a waste on a disabled child. Her father was a primary school teacher and she proved an able pupil.

She obtained work but she was paid less and was given worse conditions than her peers. She decided to leave her employment to establish an organisation to care for disability rights. In particular a group for women with disabilities. WAG Disability Rights, has addressed the issue of Intimate Partner Violence and disaster response.

In 2025 she was one of eleven women invited by the African Union and the Ethiopian government to discuss disability rights. Others present included Hon. Safia Juuko Nalule from Uganda. The aim was to amplify the "Voices of Women with Disabilities to Actively Participate in Climate Change Policy". There were over hundred delegates including Women With Disabilities. Nkhonya notes that WWDs were excluded from decision making. She noted that the hall lacked sufficient elevators, wheelchairs and sign language interpreters to offset the hall inaccessibility. WWDs, she said, need to not only be present but actively involved in decision making.

In September 2026 she was named as one of Malawi's Human Rights Commissioners. The new consort of commissioners was Orison Joseph Themba Chapond, Viwemi Chavula, Godfrey Dalitso Kangaude, Andrew Kavala, Lingalireni Mihowa, Teresa Chirwa-Ndanga and Nkhonya. The nine strong commission is completed by the Law Commissioner and the Ombudsman.

== Private life ==
Nkhonya takes pride in her body and she has three daughters.
