= Hassan Goba =

Malawian veteran broadcaster

- Born: 1 March 1960 (age 65); Lilongwe, Nyasaland, Rhodesia and Nyasaland (now Malawi)
- Education: University of Malawi
- Occupation(s): Presenter, TV personality, talk show host, event host, broadcast journalist
- Years active: 1984–present

Hassan Goba is a Malawian veteran broadcaster, journalist, radio presenter and TV personality. In 2017, Goba left Malawi Broadcasting Corporation (MBC 1). Goba worked with MBC radio 1 for over 37 years. In 2014, he was voted ‘Newsreader of the Year.’
