= Phalombe =

Malawian town

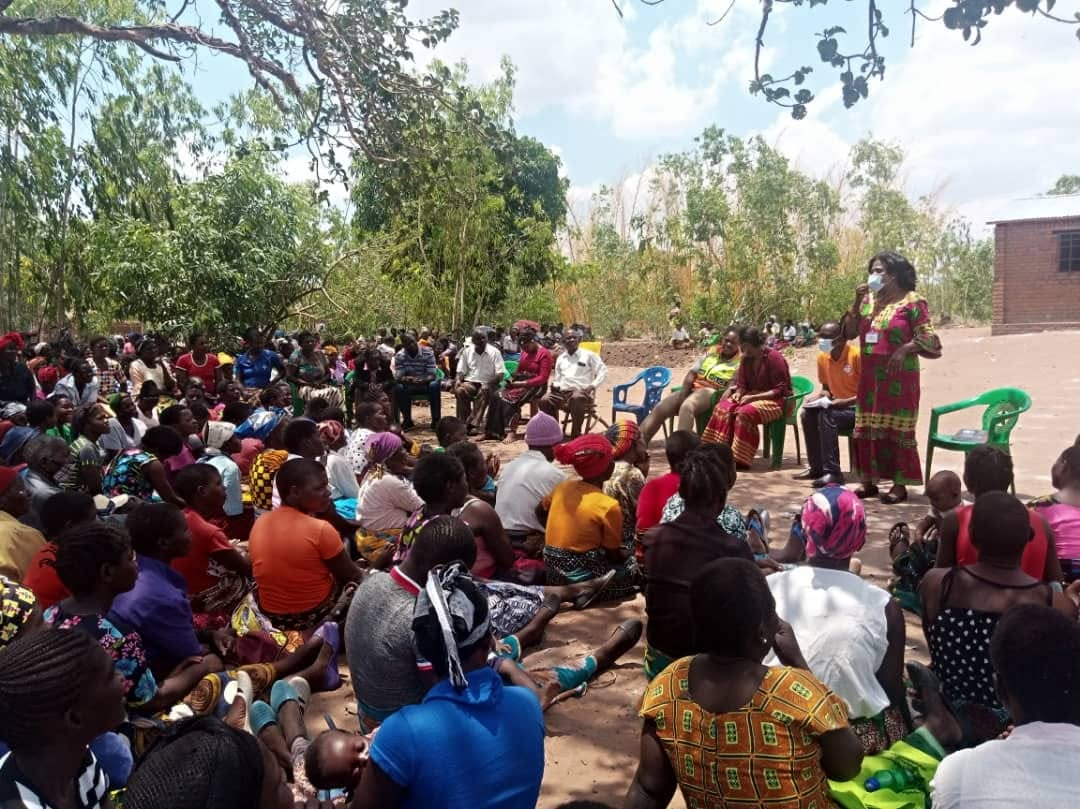
- Commissioner Stella Twea emphasises gender equality in Phalombe in 2021

- Location in Malawi
- Coordinates: 15°48′12″S 35°39′12″E
- Country: Malawi
- Region: Southern Region
- District: Phalombe District
- Elevation: 2,513 ft (766 m)

Population (2018 (Census))
  - Total: 6,242
- Time zone: +2
- Climate: Cwa

Phalombe is a town in Malawi. It is the district capital of Phalombe District.

== Location ==
Phalombe is located about 44 kilometres (27 mi), by road, north-east of Mulanje, along the T408 Road. This is approximately 97 kilometres (60 mi), by road, east of Blantyre, the financial capital of Malawi and the largest city in the country's Southern Region. Phalombe lies at an average location of 766 metres (2,513 ft) above sea level. The geographical location of Phalombe are 15°48'12.0"S, 35°39'12.0"E (Latitude:-15.803333; Longitude:35.653333).

== Overview ==
It is situated below the Fort Lister Gap between the two larger parts of the Mulanje Massif. Due to this location it is vulnerable for flash floods, which can easily occur during the rainy season. The most devastating one in recent history occurred in March 1991, which left Phalombe with a 2–3 meters (6.6–9.8 ft) high mud layer and killed hundreds of people. On this spot a monument was erected to remember the named and unnamed victims.

== Points of interest ==
5 kilometres (3 mi), south of the town center, along the Phalombe-Mulanje Road, is a Catholic mission consisting of a Catholic church and the Holy Family Hospital. The hospital is run by locals in association with the Dutch charity Memisa and is staffed by Malawian clinical officers as well as Dutch tropical doctors. Holy Family Nursing College is attached to the hospital.

The road from Mulanje to Phalombe is tarmacked, as of May 2019.

== Demographics ==
Year	Population
1998	2 592
2008	3 058
2013	6 126
2018	6 242

== Weather ==
Generally, the weather in Phalombe is warm, muggy and cloudy, from November to April and is comfortable, clear and cool from May through October. During the course of the year, the temperature typically varies from 59 to 86 °F (15 to 30 °C) and is rarely below 56 °F (13 °C) or above 92 °F (33 °C).
