= Sarai Chisala-Tempelhoff =

Malawian lawyer and activist

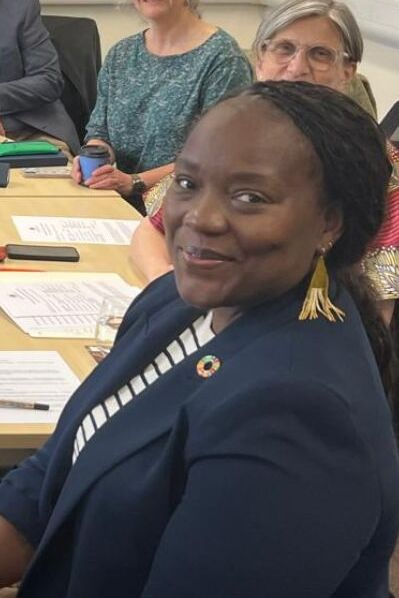
- in 2026
- Education: University of Malawi (L.L.B.); University of Pretoria (L.L.M); University of Memphis
- Occupation: lawyer
- Known for: President of the Malawian Women Lawyers Association and Malawi's Gender and Justice Unit

Sarai Chisala-Tempelhoff is a Malawian lawyer and activist. She was the President of Malawi's Women Lawyers Association from 2017. She lobbies the National Assembly on women-related issues and is consulted by the press and leading figures. The Gender and Justice Unit that she founded and leads, uses the law to improve "gender equality and social and environmental justice".

== Life ==
Chisala Tempelhoff was brought up in the village of Madimba on Likoma island. She was one of five children. Her mother had an MBA and her father was a university lecturer. She went to primary school in Zomba, Blantyre and Harare before her secondary education at Phwezi Girls Secondary School and Dominican Convent Secondary School in Harare.

She intended to study humanities but she graduated in law from the University of Malawi in Zomba before she went to South Africa to take a Master of Laws at the University of Pretoria. She focused on Human Rights and Democratisation. She has a Postgraduate Certificate in Gender and Women's Studies from the University of Memphis.

She worked for the Malawi Human Rights Commission for fifteen years.

In 2016, she and Monica Twesiime Kirya wrote a review on the state of the law in Uganda and Malawi to combat revenge porn. The review noted that although there were laws against obscenity, there was no law against revenge porn.

In 2017, she founded Malawi's Gender and Justice Unit where she was the executive director. The unit uses the law for "gender equality and social and environmental justice". In September 2017 there was a major protest concerning the number of women suffering due to gender-based violence. Seven cases were in the news of women who had been disfigured or died. Chisala Tempelhoff said that her Women's Lawyers Association was dealing with over ten cases. She presented a petition and demanded that any public employee who was guilty of this type of violence should be sacked. Clement Mukumbwa who was the Deputy Minister of Gender agreed to look at the issues raised.

Her Women's Lawyers Association was one of the groups who supported the Minister of Health, Atupele Muluzi, to successfully lobby parliament to de-criminalise the transmission of HIV in December 2017. The protest included protests by Zinenani Majawa of the Female Sex workers Association. They argued the law was based on fear and not on logic, and the law's continued existence increased violence against women.

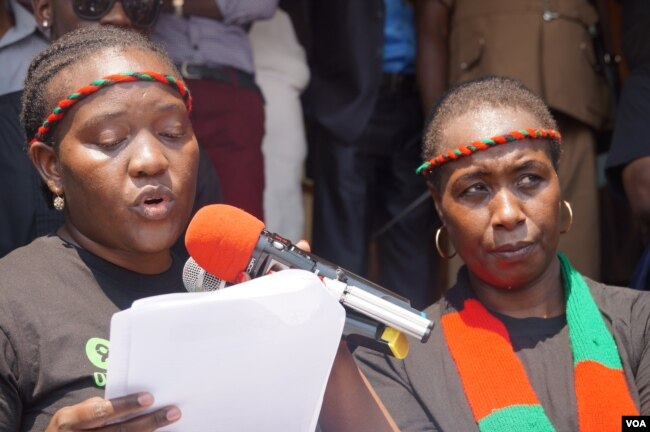
Sarai Chisala-Templehoff of the Women Lawyers Association reads a petition in Lilongwe with Jessie Kabwila

In November 2018 her Women's Lawyers Association created a petition and lobbied the President for action on improving the representation of women in government. The advocacy Coordinator Dr Benedetta Malunda argued the number of women should increase in his 20 strong cabinet and he should take action against Deputy Minister Charles Mchacha who was calling women opponents prostitutes. The call was supported by the 50:50 campaign group. President Mutharika said that he had addressed the issue during a speech at the University of Malawi, but the Women's Lawyers Association noted that it was a speech without commitment or action. Chisala Tempelhoff wrote to the President citing section 13 of the constitution which requires gender balance to be addressed. Her letter noted that further action would be taken "elsewhere" if the issue was not addressed.

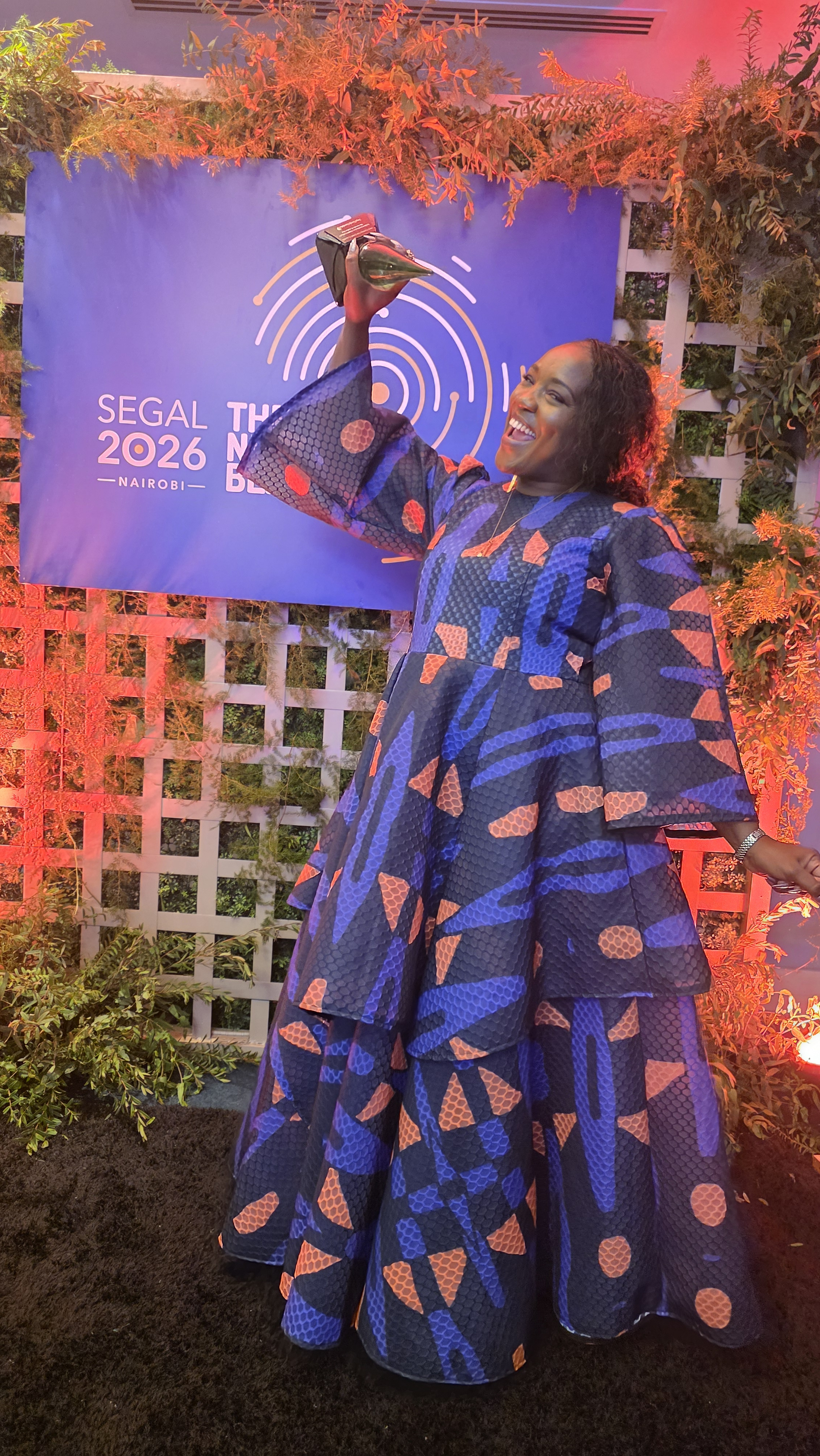
with award in 2026

In 2019, she and Chimwemwe Kussein addressed a meeting of Chewa traditional chiefs on the subject of gender-based violence. It was admitted to be endemic and she and the chiefs hoped to that they could reduce its prevalence. In the same year she became a director of the African Institute for Development Policy (AFIDEP).

In 2020, she was named by Apolitical as one of the "100 Most Influential People in Gender Policy". In 2021 she continued her investigation into "image based sexual abuse" (aka revenge porn). She noted that people were more involved and there was "a significant shift in tolerance for sexual harassment in the workplace" arising from a case of harassment at the Malawi Broadcasting Corporation.

In 2025, she was chosen to be a fellow of the Segal Family Foundation citing her work with the Gender and Justice unit, her writing and her affects in Malawi and on laws in South Africa. In April 2026 she was in Scotland where she was a guest speaker at an event organised by the Scotland Malawi Partnership.
