= Ngeyi Kanyongolo =

Malawian lawyer (1969–2024)

- Born: 31 March 1969; Blantyre, Malawi
- Died: October 28, 2024 (aged 55); Blantyre, Malawi
- Education: University of Malawi; University of London; University of Warwick
- Occupations: Lawyer, academic, businesswoman
- Years active: 1994–2024
- Title: Vice Chancellor, Catholic University of Malawi & Chairperson Standard Bank Malawi

Ngeyi Ruth Kanyongolo (31 March 1969 – 28 October 2024) was a Malawian lawyer, academic and businesswoman, who served as Vice Chancellor of the Catholic University of Malawi. From 29 June 2020, she concurrently served as the chairperson of the board of directors of Standard Bank Malawi.

== Background and education ==
Kanyongolo was born in Blantyre, Malawi. She attended Malawian schools for her elementary and secondary education. She held a Bachelor of Laws degree, awarded by the University of Malawi, in 1991. Her degree of Master of Laws was awarded by the University of London. She also obtained a Doctor of Philosophy degree from the University of Warwick in the United Kingdom.

== Career ==
Kanyongolo joined the University of Malawi as a law lecturer in 2000. At the time of her death, she assumed the responsibility of Associate Professor. She was an avid human rights activist and a promoter of women's rights. She previously served as Professor and Dean of the Faculty of Law at the University of Malawi. She specialised in business law, gender law, labour law and social security.

== Other considerations ==
Kanyongolo previously founded and served as president of Malawi Women Lawyers Society. She also served as vice president of Malawi Law Society. On 24 April 2013, she was appointed to the board of Standard Bank Malawi Plc, a commercial bank and subsidiary of the Standard Bank Group. On 29 June 2020, she was appointed chairperson of Standard Bank Malawi, replacing Rex Harawa, who retired.

Among her many titles and responsibilities, she sat on the Boards of (a) Tilitonse Foundation (b) Equality Effect of Canada and (c) SASPEN, an Association of Social Protection experts in South Africa (d) Airtel Malawi Plc (e) Old Mutual Malawi

== Personal life, death and legacy ==
Kanyongolo was married to Fidelis (Edge) Kanyongolo, a fellow academic at the University of Malawi. She died in Blantyre on 28 October 2024, at the age of 55.

In 2025 Malawi's Women Lawyers Association established an honour in Ngeyi Kanyongolo's which was to be given to people who are furthering women's rights in Malawi. The inaugural award was given to Dr. Bernadette Malunga of the University of Malawi's law department.

== See also ==
- List of universities in Malawi
