= Teresa Ndanga =

Malawian journalist (born 1982)

- in 2026
- Born: Teresa Ndanga; April 29, 1982 (age 44); Zimbabwe
- Education: Malawi Polytechnic Institute; Harvard Kennedy School
- Occupation: Journalist

Teresa Ndanga (also known as Teleza Ndanga and Teresa Chirwa-Ndanga; born 29 April 1982) is a Malawian investigative journalist. Teresa is the first female chairperson of the Media Institute of Southern Africa MISA Malawi Chapter, and the recipient of the 2010 CNN/Multichoice Health and Medical reporting award. In 2012, she received the MISA Malawi Investigative Journalist award electronic media while in 2013, she received the Overall Journalist of the Year award for the same award. In 2023 she became one of Malawi's Human Rights Commissioners and she was reappointed in 2026.

== Background and education ==
Ndanga was born on 29 April 1982 in Zimbabwe. Her family relocated to Malawi when she was nine years old. In 2007 she completed her Bachelor of Arts degree in Journalism at the Malawi Polytechnic Institute. In 2012, she was awarded the Journalism for Human Rights Fisher Fellowship through Massey College in Canada. In 2015, she attained a master's degree in Public Administration from Harvard Kennedy School in the United States.

== Career ==
Ndanga's career in journalism began in 2005 as a student intern at Zodiak Broadcasting station. She was later employed by the media house upon her graduation from the Malawi Polytechnic in 2007. After receiving the 2010 CNN/Multichoice Health and Medical Reporting Award, Teresa was promoted from being a reporter to an editor at Zodiak Broadcasting station. She progressed at Zodiak Broadcasting station to become the director of news and current affairs. During her tenure at Zodiak Broadcasting Station, the media house received the MISA Best Electronic Media House Award for six consecutive years. Teresa received the MISA Investigative Journalist Award for Electronic Media in 2012, 2013 and 2014. She also holds the 2013 MISA Overall Journalist of the Year Award. In 2015, she was listed among the top 10 women to watch in media by Media Institute of Southern Africa.

Bonface Massah, Ndanga and other Commissioners completing their terms in 2026

In 2017, Teresa was named the first female chairperson of the Media Institute of Southern Africa Malawi chapter. She led the Public Relations at AHL Malawi Group. In 2019 she and MISA worked with the British High Commissioner to Malawi, Holly Tett to create a Media Freedom and Democracy Conference for neighbouring countries in Lilongwe.

In August 2023 Ndanga was appointed as a Human Rights Commissioner who would have served until 2026, but she was reappointed together with a new cohort of commissioners.
