= Lilongwe Central Prison =

Prison in Malawi, Africa

Coordinates: 14°00′S 33°35′E

- Interactive map of Lilongwe Central Prison
- Location: Lilongwe, Malawi
- Status: Operational
- Security class: Maximum (male and female)
- Capacity: 2,500
- Opened: 1910
- Managed by: Malawi Prison Service

Lilongwe Central Prison is one of the four such similar prisons located in Lilongwe District. It has a rated capacity of approximately 2,500 inmates, although it usually holds more due to overcrowding. The facility houses male and female inmates, including convicted prisoners and those on remand.

== History ==
Lilongwe Central Prison was established in 1910 during the British colonial era, with the aim of detaining and rehabilitating offenders from Malawi's central region. The prison addressed the growing need for a secure facility to hold criminals and those who were accused of overthrowing the reigning government.

== Facilities ==
Lilongwe Central Prison has a range of facilities to support the rehabilitation and well-being of inmates, including cells for women.
