= Department of Immigration and Citizenship Services (Malawi) =

Malawian government department

- List: 2 other national names: Unduna wa za kulowa ndi kutuluka mdziko komanso unzika (Chichewa); Unduna wa vya kanjililo ka mchalo na kufuma (Tumbuka)

Department overview
- Formed: 1992
- Jurisdiction: Government of Malawi
- Headquarters: Victoria Avenue opposite Delamere House Blantyre; 15°47′10″S 35°00′21″E
- Employees: 4,654 (2018)
- Annual budget: K3.10 billion (2022/23)
- Minister responsible: Nancy Tembo, Minister of Department of Immigration and Citizenship Services (Malawi)
- Website: www.immigration.gov.mw

The Immigration and Citizenship Services is a department of the Malawian government. Nancy Tembo was appointed Minister of Immigration and Citizenship Services since.

== Duties and other functions ==
The department is responsible for:

- Maintening of the National Population Register (the civil registry), including the recording of births, marriages/civil partnerships and deaths.
- Managing immigration to Malawi and naturalisation of permanent immigrants.
- Handling refugees in Malawi
- Controlling ports of entry at land borders, seaports and airports.
- Issuing identity documents and passports.
- Issuing visas for visitors to Malawi

== Cyber attacks and corruption ==
In 2024, it was reported that the government of Malawi has suspended the issuing of passports due to a cyber-attack on the immigration service's computer network. The hackers demanded that the department pay a ransom.

Malawi's Ombudsman Grace Malera described an investigation into the Department of Immigration and Citizenship Services in 2026. She concluded that weak leadership and corruption had resulted in it "being sold to the highest bidder".
