= Rudo Chakwera =

Malawian gospel artist

Rudo Chakwera (born 1979) is a Malawian gospel artist. She is daughter-in-law to Malawi President Lazarus Chakwera.

== Personal life ==
She was born on 23 December 1979 to Isaac Mkukupa and Gloria Rose Mkukupa, a music family. She is married to Nick Chakwera with three children.

== Education ==
Rudo has a first degree in music from Chancellor College, University of Malawi, she also holds a master's in Business administration from ESAMI.

== Career ==
Though she started singing as soon as she could talk she only rose to fame in Malawi's music industry in 1999 through her first album featuring Ndine Mwana Wamasiye. Rudo holds a position in Malawi's Musicians body National Executive Committee, and also served her country through various artistic positions as board member for the Copyright Society of Malawi and board member for Channel for All Nations radio.

In 2022, on her birthday, she was at Maula Prison in Lilongwe entertaining the young offenders there with other musicians including Chikondi Wiseman. The new offenders facility was new and facing challenges; including a lack of food.
