= Safia Juuko Nalule =

Ugandan Legislator

- Born: 15 March 1966 (age 60); Uganda
- Citizenship: Uganda
- Education: Makerere University (Bachelor's degree); Law Development Centre (Dip. Law. Pract); Makerere University (Master of Arts in Human Rights)
- Occupation: Legislator
- Years active: 1990–present
- Known for: Politics
- Title: Member of Parliament; Central Region, Uganda

Safia Juuko Nalule (born 15 March 1966) is a Ugandan Disability Rights activist, politician and legislator who served as the elected woman representative for People with Disabilities, Central Region, Uganda in Uganda's tenth parliament. In April 2021, she was appointed Chairperson of Uganda Equal Opportunities Commission (EOC). Politically, she is affiliated to the National Resistance Movement under whose ticket she contested in the 2016 general elections.

== Background and education ==
According to the Equal Opportunities Commission website, Nalule was born in Mawokota, Mpigi District to the late Mr. Lule Moses and Mrs. Nanyonga Jane Lule

Nalule obtained a bachelor's degree from Makerere University in 1990 and thereafter a Certificate in Business Management Training from the International Labour Organisation / Federation of Uganda Employers in 1991. In 1996, she obtained two certificates – a Certificate in Leadership for Women from ESAMI and a Certificate in Leadership and Microfinance Management from Mobility International USA (MIUSA). She followed that up with a Diploma in Law from the Law Development Centre in 2006 and later a Master of Arts in Human Rights from Makerere University in 2016.

== Career ==
Nalule was a legislator since 2006, sitting in the eighth and ninth parliaments of Uganda. As of 2020, she was named a commissioner on the Parliamentary Commission.

Prior to that, between 2005 and 2006, she served as a Commissioner with the Constitutional Review Commission under the Ugandan Ministry of Justice and Constitutional Affairs. She was also a Councillor with the then Kampala City Council between 1997 and 2006. From 1996 to 2005, she worked as the Executive Director of Disabled Women Network and Resource Organisation in Uganda (DWNRO).

She has served as board member on the National Union of Disabled Persons of Uganda (NUDIPU) from 2015 to date, and for the Uganda Women's Network (UWONET) between 1990 and 1997.

In 2017, she was the chairperson of the Human Rights Committee. As a female legislator in the tenth parliament of Uganda, she was a member of Uganda Women Parliamentary Association (UWOPA) as well as vice chairperson on the Appointments Committee. She was listed as a member of the Committee on East African Community Affairs.

In 2025 women were invited by the African Union and the Ethiopian government to discuss disability rights in Abbis Ababa. Others present included Stella Nkhonya from Malawi. The aim was to amplify the "Voices of Women with Disabilities to Actively Participate in Climate Change Policy". The delegates included Women With Disabilities (WWDs). Nkhonya noted that the hall lacked sufficient elevators, wheelchairs and sign language interpreters to offset the hall's inaccessibility. WWDs, she said, need to not only be present but actively involved in decision making.
