= Chisomo Ngulube =

Malawian journalist and editor

- Education: Rhodes University
- Occupation: journalist
- Known for: chief editor for MBC's television news.

Chisomo Ngulube is a Malawian journalist and editor. She was the Malawi Broadcasting Corporation's chief editor for their TV news.

== Life ==
Ngulube studied at Rhodes University where she completed a post-graduate diploma in media management in 2014.

She worked as a journalist for Nation Newspapers Limited in Malawi before she joined the Malawi Broadcasting Corporation. She became the Malawi Broadcasting Corporation's chief editor for their television news. In 2017, she was a Journalism fellow for the Nieman Foundation at Harvard University. This was won competitively as there only 24 places and half of these are taken by Americans. She is only the second Malawian to join the fellowship and the only one that year from Africa who was employed by an African media company.

She has written about the freedom of the press, drawing parallels between Donald Trump's "Fake News" and the treatment of the press in Africa. She was chosen to be one of the fifteen leading women journalists to work on the women's edition of the Population Reference Bureau.

Ngulube is a leading spokesperson and vice-chair of MISA Malawi. The organisation campaigns for journalists and arranges training. Malawi's President has said that he has never requested that a journalist should be arrested for their work. However MISA Malawi says that it needs to work to give access to all voices. Ngulube challenged her peers to achieve this. Freedom of the press is said to be the policy in Malawi but journalists like Macmillan Mhone have been arrested for exposing fraud. He was arrested for “publication of news likely to cause fear and public alarm; cyber-spamming; and extortion”.
