= Charles Mchacha =

Malawian politician

Deputy Minister of Youth Development and Sports of Malawi (2010-2015), Deputy Minister for Homeland, Minister of Water
- In office 9 August 2010 – 8 March 2015
- President: Bingu wa Mutharika

Deputy Minister for Homeland

Minister for Water

Personal details
- Born: Malawi
- Party: Democratic Progressive Party (Malawi)

Charles Mchacha is a Malawian politician and educator. He was the former Deputy Minister of Youth Development and Sports in Malawi, having been appointed to the position in early 2010 by the former president of Malawi, Bingu wa Mutharika. His term began on 9 August 2010 and ended in 2015. He was later minister of Irrigation and Water Development.h

== Life ==
In November 2018 Malawi's Women Lawyers Association lobbied the President for action on improving the representation of women in government. They argued that he should also take action against Mchacha who was the Deputy Minister for Homeland. He was reported to be calling women opponents prostitutes.

In 2020 Mchacha was the former minister of Irrigation and Water Development when he and Ministry of Defence Principal Secretary Bright Kumwembe were changed with offences relating to Mchacha's acquisition of land in 2019. The land was in Kanjedza Forest near Blantyre and the alleged acquisition was during his time as Deputy Minister of Homeland.

Awards and achievements
Preceded by	Deputy Minister of Youth Development and Sports of Malawi	Succeeded by
