= Malawi Law Society =

- Abbreviation: MLS
- Formation: 1965
- Type: Bar association
- Headquarters: Blantyre, Malawi
- Location: Malawi
- President: Tionge Penjani
- Website: www.malawilawsociety.net

Malawi Law Society is a legal membership organization that unites all lawyers in Malawi. It is administered by an executive board elected by its members at an Annual General Meeting.

== History ==
The Malawi Law Society (MLS) was established by the Legal Education and Legal Practitioners Act of 1965, it was later re-established under the Legal Education and Legal Practitioners Act of 2017.

Gabriel Chembezi became the acting head of Malawi's Anti-Corruption Bureau in November 2025 and his appointment was questioned by the Malawi Law Society who noted the absence of a rigorous vetting process. Chembezi has been accused of a conflict of interest, in being actively involved in the overpriced sale of a hotel and of using his bureau's information as leverage to further his own position. The Malawi Law Society has called upon Chembezi to resign.

== Mandate ==
As the official bar association for legal practitioners in Malawi, its primary mandate is to regulate the legal profession and advise on matters of justice administration. The Malawi Law Society is the association responsible for upholding professional standards among legal practitioners, promoting legal education, and ensuring the independence of the judiciary and the legal profession.

== Malawi Legal Information Institute (MLII) ==
The Malawi Legal Information Institute is a division of the MLS. It is a source of public legal information relating to legal judgements and rulings in Malawi.

== Malawi Law Journal (MLJ) ==
The Malawi Law Journal (MLJ) is a peer reviewed publication sponsored by the Malawi Law Society, University of Malawi, and Malawian scholars across the globe. Its current editor-in-chief is Danwood M Chirwa.

== Women Lawyers Association of Malawi ==
The Women Lawyers Association formally launched in 1998 but it existed within the society from 1993 when it was called the permanent Committee on Women and Children’s Affairs. The organisation later broke its links with the Law Society to concentrate on its own goals.
