= Women Lawyers Association (Malawi) =

Non-profit organization in Malawi

- Abbreviation: WLA
- Formation: 1998; 28 years ago
- Headquarters: Area 6, Lilongwe
- Coordinates: 13°58′S 33°46′E
- Region served: Malawi
- Official language: English, including local languages
- President: Yankho Mwandidya
- Website: womenlawyersmalawi.org

The Women Lawyers Association of Malawi (WLA) is a non-profit organization dedicated to advancing and safeguarding the rights of women and children through legal services, advocacy, and research formed in 1998. It campaigns for women's rights. It helped to change the law associated with HIV. It has represented women who were sexually abused by the police and campaigned to increase the number of women in parliament.

== History ==
The Women Lawyers Association was founded in 1998. It is a non-governmental organization that promotes women's rights and children. It is an advocate for legal changes to reduce violence and discrimination.

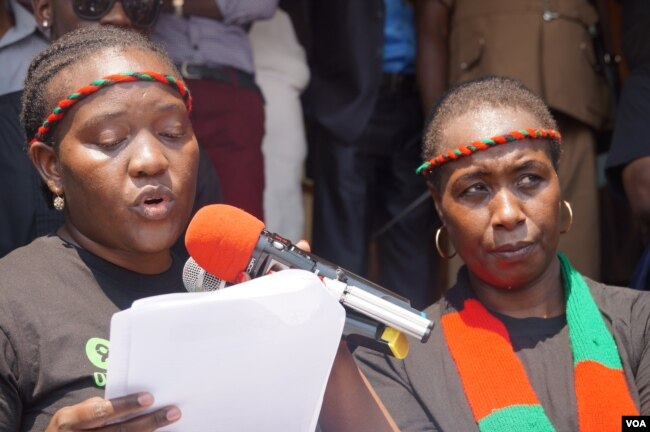
Sarai Chisala Tempelhoff of the Women Lawyers Association reads a petition in Lilongwe with Jessie Kabwila

In 2017, its President became Sarai Chisala-Tempelhoff. In September 2017, there was a major protest concerning the number of women suffering due to gender-based violence in Lilongwe. Seven cases were in the news of women who had been disfigured or killed. The Women's Lawyers Association was dealing with over ten cases. Sarai Chisala-Templehoff presented a petition and demanded that any public employee who was guilty of this type of violence should be sacked. Clement Mukumbwa who was the Deputy Minister of Gender agreed to look at the issues raised. Beatrice Mateyo had participated in the march and she had carried a placard written in Chichewa and English that was considered offensive by the police. Mateyo was arrested and charged her with "insulting the modesty of a woman" and she applied for a judicial review. Mateyo was represented by lawyers from the Women Lawyers Association.

The Women's Lawyers Association was one of the groups who supported the Minister of Health, Atupele Muluzi, to successfully lobby parliament to de-criminalise the transmission of HIV in December 2017. They argued the law was based on fear and not on logic, and the law's continued existence increased the stigma and violence against women.

In November 2018 the WLA created a petition and lobbied the President to improve the representation of women in government. The call was supported by the 50:50 campaign group. The advocacy Coordinator Dr Benedetta Malunda argued the percentage of women should increase in his 20 strong cabinet and he should take action against Deputy Minister Charles Mchacha who was calling women opponents prostitutes. President Mutharika noted that he had addressed the issue at the University of Malawi, but the WLA noted that this was a speech with no commitment. The WLA's President wrote to the President Mutharika citing section 13 of the constitution. She said that further action would be taken if the gender balance was not addressed.

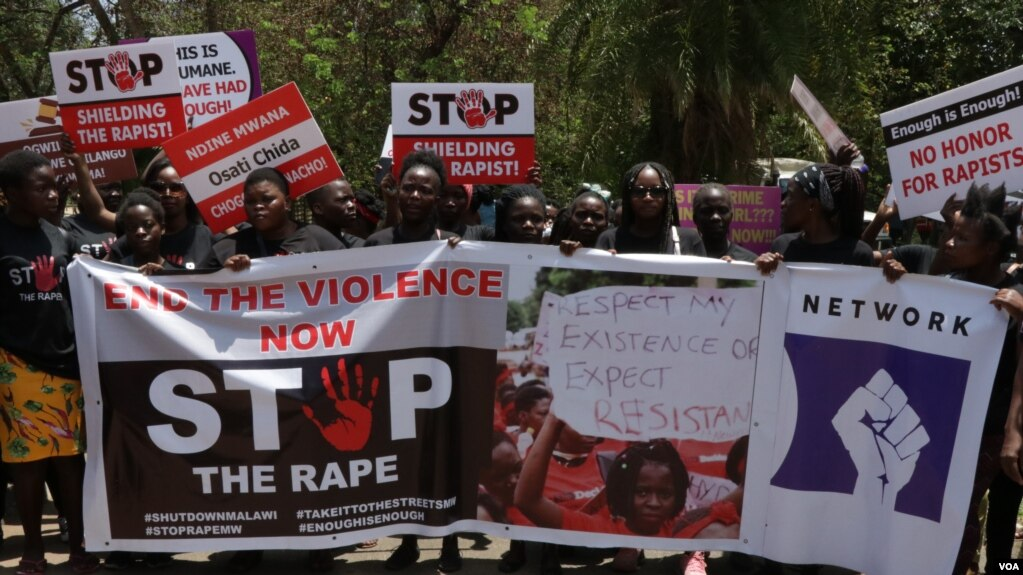
Protesters against increased cases of sexual abuse in Blantyre in November 2020

There were protests against the WLA in 2021. The WLA were representing eighteen women who had been sexually assaulted by the police. The assaults took place after protests in 2019 resulting from the national election. The WLA said that they were representing these women for nothing. However the lawyers were supported by donors and the lawyers were then claimed their expenses from the courts. They were accused of "double dipping". Reports noted that the WLA lawyers were paid $200,000 by donors to fight this case, but the 18 women eventually received damages of between $5,000 and $18,000. The WLA's President, Immaculate Maluza, defended the lawyers' fees, but the Malawi Law Society and Parliament intended to investigate.

In 2025, Dr. Bernadette Malunga joined the WLA's board. She became the inaugural recipient of the Professor Ngeyi Kanyongolo Award. The new award was designed to recognise Malawian female lawyers who are advancing women’s rights.

In 2026, Amal Clooney reported on work to exploit AI to address the gap between the supply and the need for justice. She said that 10% of girls under 15 are forced into marriage in Malawi, but there were only 800 lawyers to serve Malawi's population of 22 million. Her Clooney Foundation for Justice was working with Phillipa Webb of the University of Oxford’s Blavatnik School of Government to create an AI chatbot in co-operation with the WLA. It can prepare common legal remedies including draft protection orders and compliant protection order requests. The system will work in local languages. The system calls on Clooney's work with Phillipa Webb in their 2021 book, The Right to a Fair Trial in International Law. There are many local languages in Malawi, but the most common are Chitumbuka and Chichewa. The system is planned to also advise people of their closest lawyer.
