= Martha Chizuma =

Malawi's Former Anti-Corruption Bureau Director

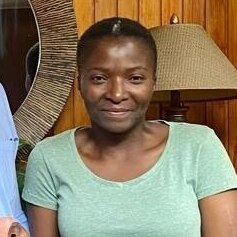
- in 2022 at US embassy

Director of the Anti-Corruption Bureau
- Appointed by: Lazarus Chakwera
- President: Lazarus Chakwera
- Preceded by: Reyneck Matemba

Personal details
- Born: 8 February 1977 (age 49)
- Education: University of Malawi, Chancellor College, University of East London

Martha Chizuma (born 8 February 1977) is a Malawian lawyer. She is the former director of Malawi's anti-corruption bureau. She was appointed on 29 April 2021 after serving as Malawi's second woman ombudsman since 2015. Her contract was not renewed after it ended in 31 March 2024. Prior to that, she served as the Senior Resident Magistrate in the courts of Malawi.

== Life ==
Chizuma was the penultimate child of eleven born in Nkula Falls on 8 February 1977. Her parents came from Nkhotakota.

== Education ==
Chizuma studied at Chancellor College in Zomba leaving with an LLB law qualification. She has a Masters of Laws in International Economic Law from the University of East London.

When she was appointed to be Senior Resident Magistrate she was the youngest and only woman in that role in Malawi's northern region. She continued on that path, in 2015 she was the youngest ombudsman in Africa at the age of 36.

== Controversy ==
In January 2022, a phone call recording between Chizuma and an unidentified man was leaked. In the phone call, she alleged that judges and magistrates were part of a corruption syndicate. She was accused of being unprofessional for the alleged discussion.

On 6 December 2022, Chizuma was arrested in connection to a leaked audio clip in which she spoke with another person about the fight against corruption in the country. The arrest was said to be illegal and she reported that she was forced to kneel during questioning. She was released on bail the same day of her arrest. Three days after her arrest she addressed a crowd concerning her determination to end corruption. She and Prof. Christopher Stone published a paper on the "Conundrum of Independence" while she was still leading the ACB.

Following the pressure from the executive, Chizuma´s contract as Malawi's Anti-Corruption Bureau Director was not renewed. The Deputy Director General Hillary Chilomba was the Acting Director General from 5 June 2024. The interview process had to be restarted after it was discovered by Grace Malera and her Office of the Ombudsman that two people on the ACB shortlist (including Chiloma) failed to meet the criteria required for the position.

It was reported that over 100 cases of corruption investigated by the ACB during her tenure may never be resolved. Chizuma had no plans when she left the ACB, however she was appointed as an advisor about anti-corruption by the World Bank in March 2025. The appointment raised questions in the press as she had been sidelined in her national role, and then recognised for her expertise by an international body.
