= Anti-Corruption Bureau (Malawi) =

Malawi government agency

Agency overview
- Formed: 26 November 1997; 28 years ago
- Jurisdiction: Government of Malawi
- Headquarters: Mulanje House, City Centre Lilongwe Malawi
- Agency executive: (was) Martha Chizuma who replaced Reyneck Matemba, Director General

The Anti-Corruption Bureau (ACB) is a government department in Malawi that was established in 1997, with the mission of spearheading the fight against corruption through prevention, education, and law enforcement. It aims at combating corruption in all its forms, and to promote integrity and good governance in Malawi.

It was established during the presidency of Bakili Muluzi. Muluzi was tried for corruption in 2011.

== History ==
=== Origin and establishment ===
The ACB was established in response to the need to combat corruption in Malawi, which was seen as a major obstacle to the country's development. The bureau was set up as an independent body, with the power to investigate and prosecute corruption cases.

== Achievements ==
The ACB has achieved several successes in its fight against corruption, including the prosecution of high-profile cases and the recovery of stolen assets. The bureau established initiatives aimed at preventing corruption, such as the National Anti-Corruption Strategy and the Anti-Corruption Awareness Program.

The ACB was established during the presidency of Bakili Muluzi. Muluzi was charged with corruption in 2005 after his presidency ended. He was accused of misappropriated $11m but he claimed that this was an accusation created by his successor Bingu wa Mutharika. Muluzi avoided a trial because of his ill-health for several years. He was tried for corruption in 2011.

In 2021 ex-President Peter Mutharika was called to answer enquiries by the ACB. The ACB wanted to ask Mutharika about 1.5 billion Kwatcha's worth of cement that had been imported using the then President Mutharika's authority. It was alleged that his staff may have used his authority and the ACB wanted to understand how this might have happened.

In 2022 the Lands Minister Kezzie Msukwa was arrested by the Anti-Corruption Bureau over a land deal. Msukwa applied for a judicial review and the High Court Judge Zione Ntaba set aside the arrest, but she did not grant the review. Her decision created some debate and the Malawi Law Society issued a statement which was interpreted at a rebuke of Ntaba's action. The law society argued that if there was no review then an arrest could not be set aside.

In 2025 the ACB partnered with the United Nations Development Programme to work on an app to assist with anti-corruption. The app will allow the anonymous reporting of suspected cases. The app was launched at the end of August by the acting general secretary of the ACB.

=== Vision and mission ===
The vision of the agency is to create a corruption-free Malawi, where public resources are used for the benefit of all citizens. The mission is to spearhead the fight against corruption through prevention, education, and law enforcement.

== Leadership ==
The Director General of the agency Reyneck Matemba, was appointed in 2020. In 2023, Matemba was no longer the DG, he was representing himself in defence of charges that he was involved in corruption surrounding the awarding of a $7.8m contract to Zunith Sattar. In 2024 Matemba was banned from entering the United States due to his involvement in corruption.

Martha Chizuma, a Malawian lawyer, was appointed as Director General on 29 April 2021 after serving as Malawi's second woman ombudsman. Her contract was not renewed after it ended in 31 March 2024. It was reported that over 100 cases of corruption investigated by the ACB may never be resolved.

In 2025 the acting Director General was the legal counsel Hillary Chilomba. In August he was launching an app to allow the reporting of corruption and in October Chilomba was accused of being involved in the misappropriation of fertiliser that was intended to be distributed to farmers of smallholdings. Gabriel Chembezi became the acting head of the ACB in November 2025 although his appointment was questioned by the Malawi Law Society who noted the absence of a rigorous vetting process. Chembezi has been accused of a conflict of interest, in being actively involved in the overpriced sale of a hotel and of using ACB information as leverage to further his own position. The Malawi Law Society has called upon Chembezi to resign. In 2026 Chembezi was among several candidates to become the new chief, but all of the candidates failed the interview process. Chembezi's tenure was toi run out on November 3 but the Justice and Constitutional Affairs Minister Charles Mhango authorised him to continue until a permanent replacement could be appointed.

== See also ==
- Corruption in Malawi
