= Abortion in Malawi =

In Malawi, abortion is only legal to save the life of the mother and abortion is a felony punishable by imprisonment. Providing materials for an abortion is also punishable. Most abortions in Malawi are unsafe and are performed by traditional healers or covert clinics or are self-induced. Unsafe abortion contributes to maternal mortality.

Malawi's penal code, introduced in 1930, has an abortion ban based on that of the British Empire. Since the 1990s, reproductive health organisations have been active in the country. The country ratified treaties including the 2005 Maputo Protocol. Pro-abortion activists argued that the abortion ban caused unsafe abortions and violated women's rights. In 2010, the international non-governmental organization Ipas formed a coalition that lobbied for abortion law reform. In 2012, the Ministry of Health under President Joyce Banda formed a commission that proposed the Termination of Pregnancy Bill. The bill would allow abortions in the cases of rape, risk to health, or birth defects. It received support and opposition from various religious groups. An attempt to introduce it to the National Assembly in 2016 was rejected. It was introduced to the assembly in 2021 but failed.

Abortion is a stigmatised subject in Malawi. Abortions are common among women with unwanted pregnancies, and the low rate of contraception contributes to the abortion rate. Unsafe abortion is particularly common among adolescents. Post-abortion care is available in free public facilities and other facilities, but uses dilation and curettage more frequently than manual vacuum aspiration, despite national and international guidelines recommending the latter.

== Legislation ==
The laws introduced by the British colonial government in 1930, bans abortion. The country's abortion law has is very similar to the colonial law. Section 149, which is based on the British Offences Against the Person Act 1861, bans abortion:

Any person who, with intent to procure a miscarriage of a woman, whether she is or is not with child, unlawfully administers to her or causes her to take any poison or other noxious thing, or uses any force of any kind, or uses any other means whatever, shall be guilty of a felony and shall be liable to imprisonment for fourteen years.

— Section 149

Section 150 sets a seven-year prison sentence for administering or aiding in an abortion. Section 151 sets a three-year jail sentence for providing "commodities" that aid in an abortion. Section 243, based on the Infant Life (Preservation) Act 1929, allows abortion if necessary to save the life of the mother:

A person is not criminally responsible for performing, in good faith and with reasonable care and skill, a surgical operation upon any person for his benefit, or upon an unborn child for the preservation of the mother's life, if the performance of the operation is reasonable, having regard to the patient's state at the time, and to all the circumstances of the case.

— Section 243

Prison sentences of seven to fourteen years for receiving an abortion, or three years for providing abortion drugs or tools, are enforced. Abortions are rarely reported to authorities, and cases that are reported are not prosecuted. The law does not have guidelines on which conditions abortion is lawful under or medical standards on who can provide abortions or what methods they can use. Healthcare workers interpret the law conservatively due to the lack of clarity and fears of prosecution. Some people in Malawi feel that the law is contradictory or can be modified by local leaders. In practice, an abortion requires the endorsement of two obstetricians and spousal consent.

== History ==
=== Abortion ban and early advocacy ===
President Hastings Banda held the stance that family planning is against Malawian values; by the 2010s, this led to an argument that abortion services have been imposed by foreign donors. Maternal health and pregnancy care have been a focus of the government since the 1980s. The Safe Motherhood Initiative of 1987, the International Conference on Population and Development of 1994, and the Fourth World Conference on Women of 1995 influenced Malawi's focus on reproductive health services including post-abortion care (PAC). MSI Reproductive Choices and its national affiliate Banja La Mtsogolo have operated in Malawi since 1987. After the first multiparty elections in 1994, more reproductive health organisations began operating in Malawi, including Population Services International in 1994, CARE in 1998, and Ipas, EngenderHealth, and Jhpiego in 1999. The Family Planning Association of Malawi was registered in 1999 and became a Planned Parenthood affiliate in 2004. These provided resources to expand PAC. In 2000, the Ministry of Health partnered with Jhpiego to expand PAC. In 2008, Ipas established a Malawi office and registered Ipas Malawi as a national NGO, after an invitation by Minister of Health Marjory Ngaunje.

Malawi ratified the Maputo Protocol in May 2005. Article 14 mandates the right to abortion in the cases of rape, incest, fetal non-viability, or danger to the mother's physical or mental health, but political and administrative barriers have prevented Malawi from passing such legislation. The National Sexual and Reproductive Health and Rights Policy 2009 called for access to abortion services to the full extent of the law, prevention of unsafe abortion, and access to post-abortion care, counseling, and family planning.

After a 2008 meeting with the Ipas African Alliance, and again in 2011, Malawi's Reproductive Health Unit and Human Rights Commission petitioned to reform the law. In 2009, the women's rights group Women in Law in Southern Africa–Malawi sued the national government on the grounds that the anti-abortion law infringed on women's rights. The Malawi Human Rights Commission supported the initiative. Secretary of Health Christopher Kang'ombe said in 2010 that the government did not plan to legalise abortion. The coordinator of the Islamic Information Bureau, Sheikh Dinala Chabulika, said in 2011 that abortion violated Islamic teachings and that he opposed its legalisation.

In 2011, the UK Department for International Development funded Ipas and MSI for a multi-country program that expanded their operations in Malawi. These organisations provide technical support and influence policy. The U.N. Convention on the Elimination of All Forms of Discrimination Against Women noted Malawi's maternal mortality rate in 2010 and called for legal access to safe abortion in 2015. The Gender Equality Act of 2013 guarantees the right of access to sexual and reproductive health services and the right to choose one's number of children.

The Malawi Law Commission has said that the ban on abortion leads to unsafe abortions that result in complications or death. In 2000, a special Law Commission reviewed the existing law and recommended a new law to provide for appropriate legal abortion. In 2008, a group of obstetrician-gynecologists including Dr. Chisale Mhango urged the Law Commission to review the abortion law. A study by the Ministry of Health and Ipas estimated that the country had 70,000 abortions in 2009 and recommended reform of the law.

=== Termination of Pregnancy Bill ===
==== Special Law Commission ====
In 2010, Ipas and Women in Law Southern Africa–Malawi created the Coalition for Prevention of Unsafe Abortion (COPUA), a group of 12 organisations, expanding to 60 by 2016. Most of the members are national NGOs. Through the coalition, these groups are discreetly involved in law reform. They downplay their individual roles to avoid scrutiny and accusations of illegal activity. Banja La Mtsogolo declined to join as it feared backlash for its European leadership, but it contributes funding. In 2012, under the leadership of the policy associate of Ipas Malawi, COPUA began a lobbying campaign, meeting with politicians and religious leaders and making media appearances. After lobbying by Ipas, the Law Commission formed the Special Law Commission on the Review of the Law on Abortion, which included representatives of the Ministry of Health, the Ministry of Justice, the Malawi Law Society, the judiciary, the Catholic Church, the Malawi Council of Churches, the Muslim Association of Malawi, the Malawi College of Medicine, and traditional leaders. The commission had the goal of bringing the abortion law in line with the constitution, international law, and the government's guidelines. It noted the "mixed reactions and perceptions" regarding abortion and included high-level representatives of religious groups to build public confidence.

In 2012, after a request by the Ministry of Health, president Joyce Banda began a review of the abortion law. The Special Law Commission analyzed local policies and international treaties. They travelled to study the abortion laws of Zambia, Ethiopia, and Mauritius. They held meetings with stakeholders in ten districts of Malawi. At the 2014 Pan-African Parliament Conference, the deputy chair of the Women's Caucus and the deputy secretary-general of the ruling party voiced their commitment to abortion reform. The same year, the government wrote reports about reviewing its law to the African Commission on Human and Peoples' Rights, the United Nations Human Rights Council, and the United Nations Human Rights Committee.

The Special Law Commission found a high rate of abortions with frequent complications and deaths. They concluded that the abortion law must be liberalised to follow human rights treaties. The judge Esme Chombo led the Commission, which wrote a report recommending the decriminalisation of certain abortions. Leading midwife Anne Phoya was one of the ten commissioners. They recommended a more liberal approach, extending the circumstances where abortion could be permitted to include rape and incest. It did not include financial considerations. Phoya noted that this would be a significant relaxation because Malawi was a poor country, so many could use this as justification.

==== Proposed bill and debate ====
In a July 2015 press conference, the Special Law Commission proposed the Termination of Pregnancy (TOP) Bill to ease restrictions on abortion. The proposed bill would permit abortion if the pregnancy was caused by rape or incest, would risk the physical or mental health of the mother, or would result in a malformed fetus. It allows providers to refuse abortion to a woman whose life is not in danger. It mandates family planning counselling before and after abortion. It authorises minors' parents to approve or reject their abortions, unless the provider determines it is necessary.

COPUA had gotten a majority of the parliament to support the bill, but after the 2014 Malawian general election, in which most members of parliament lost their seats, it was unable to secure support among the new members. In August, all political parties voiced support for the recommendations. In March 2016, the Ministry of Justice and Constitutional Affairs recommended that the National Assembly debate the proposal. The Cabinet of Malawi reviewed the bill to be sent to the National Assembly for debate. Many members of parliament, including Aisha Mambo who is Muslim, were noncommittal and said they would base their decision on their religious beliefs. The bill was presented to the Ministry of Health in 2017, and lobbyists expected the bill to be presented to Parliament in fall of that year. The attempt to introduce the bill was rejected after protests.

The Ministry of Health and the international NGO Ipas have pushed for abortion reform. They say that legal abortion would save the government money, be good for the economy, and result in fewer deaths. Ipas has argued that an abortion ban violates the Gender Equality Act. The organisation frames unsafe abortion as a "pandemic" and aims to deemphasise counterarguments about morality and rights. The Obstetrician and Gynaecologist Association of Malawi was established in 2016 and became a vocal supporter of abortion reform. The chair of COPUA argued in 2016 that the law did not provide enough grounds for legal abortion. The president of the Women Lawyers Association of Malawi, Immaculate Maluza, said, "This is a health issue, [but] most opposition is on religious and moral grounds, claiming this [bill] is a Western thing."

Some religious groups pressured the parliament not to approve the bill. The Catholic Episcopal Conference of Malawi, Evangelical Association of Malawi, Malawi Council of Churches, and the Muslim Association of Malawi have opposed the bill. The Archbishop of Blantyre, Thomas Luke Msusa, said in November 2016 that "no one can under any circumstance claim for himself the right directly to destroy an innocent human being." The Episcopal Conference said in 2016 that it was "[telling] the world to stop imposing foreign cultures on Malawi." The Catholic and Evangelical associations led an anti-abortion, anti-homosexuality protest that December, attended by two thousand people in Blantyre and one thousand in Lilongwe.

Other religious groups supported the bill, including some that previously opposed abortion. Prophet Amos Tchuma of Faith of God Ministries voiced support. In July 2016, faith leaders from across the country met with COPUA for two days. The Malawi Council of Churches began to encourage the faith community to support the bill. Its chair, Reverend Alex Benson Maulana, said, "We will continue to preach that abortion is a sin but we appreciate government efforts to address maternal mortality caused by unwanted pregnancy." Meetings with COPUA led to the establishment of the Religious Leaders Network for Choice by fifteen Christian and Muslim leaders in 2019; it grew to over one thousand members by 2025.

In January 2017, United States president Donald Trump reinstated the Mexico City policy as the Protecting Life in Global Health Assistance policy, which banned funding from U.S. agencies to foreign NGOs that advocated for abortion or "[promoted] changes in a country's laws or policies related to abortion as a method of family planning". Malawian NGOs and the government had been receiving large amounts of aid from the U.S. All Malawian NGOs that were allocated U.S. funding for 2018 chose to comply with the policy. Banja La Mtsologo failed to comply and lost funding, leading to the closure of clinics. NGOs could no longer campaign for the TOP Bill. COPUA's lobbying had involved speaking directly with politicians and stakeholders, which was no longer permitted. The coalition lost partners and funding. Public awareness of the TOP Bill was low, so members of parliament were not incentivised to table the bill without lobbyists. The Mexico City policy was rescinded in 2021 by Trump's successor, Joe Biden.

In 2019, the Episcopal Conference used part of a grant from the US Conference of Catholic Bishops to lobby MPs against the proposal. The American group Human Life International requested donations for a media campaign against the bill. The Spanish group CitizenGo sponsored an anti-abortion rally. American and British pro-life organisations have written articles to delegitimise the Malawian campaign, saying Ipas is the foreign organisation behind COPUA and accusing it of a eugenics campaign. These groups ally with national figures to lobby politicians against the bill. Human Life International, which opposes the Maputo Protocol, has made personal attacks on reproductive health advocates in Malawi and accused Ipas of "targeting the country for depopulation".

==== 2021 parliamentary discussion ====
In 2021, MP Mathews Ngwale of the Chiradzulu East constituency volunteered to put the bill up to discussion. He said, "abortion is already allowed in our laws and what we're doing is to increase the situations where this can be allowed." On 11 March, the parliament rejected his proposal. Ngwale said he was not giving up but had not decided when to reopen the discussion. The Secretary-General of the Episcopal Conference of Malawi, Henry Saindi, said, "The bill does not reflect our values, our culture and our aspirations as a nation." A representative of MSI, Simeon Thodi, said the introduction of the bill was "a very big milestone" that had been enabled by supportive religious leaders.

The Centre for Solutions Journalism, which had conducted studies on unsafe abortion, advocated for the re-introduction of the bill. Nyale Institute, an advocacy group aiming to simplify the legal framework for abortion, published a manual about the existing legal framework in February 2025. In May 2025, the High Court of Malawi heard a case against the Ministry of Health whose plaintiff had been denied an abortion after being raped as a thirteen-year-old. The plaintiff argued that, under the Gender Equality Act and other laws, pregnant minors had a right to abortion.

== Prevalence ==
In 2015, about 141,000 abortions took place in Malawi, or 38 per 1,000 women. The lowest rate per 1,000 women was 29 in the Central Region and the highest was 61 in the Northern Region. The share of unintended pregnancies resulting in abortion increased from 16% in 1990–1994 to 27% in 2015–2019. The first national survey on abortion found that, in 2009, there were 67,300 abortions and 18,700 patients for abortion complications. The number of abortions had increased between 2009 and 2015 despite an increase in contraceptive use.

Most abortions in Malawi are unsafe. Many abortions are performed by private clinics or traditional healers. The International Traditional Medicine Council of Malawi condemns the practice. Some women perform self-induced abortions by consuming herb mixes, washing powder, drugs, or bark. Some insert cassava sticks, branches, lemon juice, or hangers into their vaginas.

Due to the restrictive law, abortions are almost never available within Malawi's public health system. Health workers are frequently requested to perform abortions, but refuse. There is no government-supported abortion training for public health providers. Some women receive safe abortions from covert providers in public and private clinics in urban areas. These services are expensive, costing about 5000 Malawian kwacha (US$35).

Motives for seeking abortions include poverty, not wanting more children, wanting to space out children's births, wanting to finish education, extramarital pregnancy, pregnancy from rape, and influence by partners or parents. Malawi's high total fertility rate and unmet need for contraception contribute to the frequency of unsafe abortions. Catholic facilities do not offer contraception, and others have low stock. Public perceptions associate birth control with negative health effects or promiscuity. Some husbands discourage contraception to have more children or to discourage promiscuity. Knowledge about contraception is low among both married and unmarried women, especially young women, and is lower in men. There is a stigma surrounding extramarital pregnancy. Young women are more impacted as pregnant girls are not allowed in school. Some girls in rural areas take part in initiation ceremonies that involve beginning sexual relations, which can result in unwanted pregnancies. Older women with unwanted pregnancies are commonly labelled as prostitutes. Abortions, particularly unsafe ones, are common among sex workers.

Unsafe abortions among adolescents are frequent due to low knowledge, early sexual relationships, and low rates of contraception. About one-third of people aged 15 to 19 and one-fifth of those aged 12 to 14 know friends who have attempted abortions. Adolescent girls become aware of their pregnancies after taking pregnancy tests or missing their periods. Many adolescents attempt self-induced abortions.

Abortions cause 6–18% of maternal deaths in Malawi; the Ministry of Health cites it as 18%. In 2010, it was the second-leading cause of maternal mortality. The country's maternal mortality rate is one of the highest in the world. Women who are poor or in rural areas have higher morbidity and mortality from abortions. A report on maternal mortality by the World Health Organization, Ipas, and the Ministry of Health recommends reviewing the abortion law, improving the family planning programme, addressing reproductive health of youths, and improving post-abortion care.

Medical abortion has led to an increase in safe abortions. Women approve of medical abortion as it provides privacy and anonymity, avoiding stigma from community members and medical professionals and legal risks. Mobilizing Activists Around Medication Abortion, a network of eleven NGOs formed in 2016, works to increase access to medical abortion in seven African countries including Malawi. Misoprostol, which is used as a medical abortion drug, is approved in the country, but mifepristone is unavailable.

The stigma surrounding abortion contributes to secrecy for those who receive it. Widespread myths about abortion include beliefs that women who abort become infertile, can kill those who have sex with them, or can infect communities. The culture values women who have many children, and young women who receive abortions may lose marriage opportunities. The stigma can be present among PAC providers, though some health workers say the stigma is not present or decreases after training. Most health workers support abortion law reform but believe it would face strong opposition. Some supporters believe there should be restrictions to prevent abuse of the system. Those who oppose reform are mostly motivated by religion. Most churches in Malawi allow members to have abortions if their lives are in danger, and some allow it in the case of rape.

== Post-abortion care ==
Post-abortion care (PAC) is available at most secondary and tertiary care facilities and some primary care facilities. As of 2009, PAC is provided by 93 public facilities, 65 facilities run by NGOs (such as the Christian Health Association of Malawi and Banja La Mtsogolo), and 8 private facilities. Two government hospitals, Chiradzulu District Hospital and Queen Elizabeth Central Hospital, provide the majority of PAC. Public health facilities provide PAC and post-abortion family planning for free. These facilities are mostly in urban areas.

In 2022, health facilities' logbooks recorded 58,000 cases, an increase in documentation since 2020. Over one-quarter of recipients of PAC have at least moderate morbidity. As of 2009, the death rate is 387 deaths per 100,000 PAC complications. Malawi has no national standards for post-abortion care. Nearly all providers post guidelines for care, document cases, and review services.

The government spends at least one million USD per year on PAC. According to Ipas, public health clinics spend $314,000 per year, according to Ipas, and legalizing abortion would reduce PAC costs by twenty to thirty percent.

Many patients come to clinics in life-threatening condition or delay seeking care due to the stigma surrounding abortion. Most do not admit to having abortions. The most common complications treated are sepsis, retained products of conception, and fever. Women from rural areas are more likely to have severe complications. The fatality rate of PAC is 387 per 100,000 procedures, as of 2015.

Health centers often face shortages of disinfectant and pain-relief medication. The government's Standard Equipment List includes MVA, but health officials are unsure about its availability. In some facilities with MVA, the equipment is worn out or locked away. Some health workers feel proud or sympathetic about performing PAC. Many others have negative attitudes toward the procedures or women who receive them. Some medical staff members perceive an increase in their PAC workload or that providing PAC encourages more women to get abortions.

In August–September 2009, half of women seeking PAC were under 25, and one-fifth were adolescents. Two-thirds of the women were from rural areas, and most (including most adolescents) were married. Young women receiving PAC had low access to contraceptives, despite near-universal awareness of them. Adolescents seeking PAC are often told that parental consent is required, even if they are legal adults.

=== Methods ===
Malawi's national PAC policy, like the WHO guidelines, promotes manual vacuum aspiration (MVA) over dilation and curettage (D&C). After a 1999 report that most hospitals only offered D&C, many hospitals implemented an intervention program to increase use of MVA. Since 2003, the government has worked to expand and improve PAC. Since 2010, the use of MVA for PAC has been decreasing, and curettage is still used after early pregnancy loss. Treatment is impaired by a lack of equipment, resources, training, and staff. Although health providers are aware that MVA is safer, they may opt for D&C because MVA is more time-consuming, they do not always have functioning MVA equipment, or staff members are not trained in or encouraged to perform the method. Nurses are trained in MVA as they cannot perform D&C. Some doctors view D&C as their job and MVA as nurses' job. Training interventions have led to improvements in hospitals performing MVA.

Misoprostol is approved to for treatment of postpartum bleeding and post-abortion care but is not commonly used to induce abortions. It is used to treat only 1.3% of incomplete abortions. Misoprostol is available at many hospitals, but sometimes faces shortages. Health providers are widely supportive of its use and encourage its availability for pregnancies terminated within twelve weeks. They view it as easier, faster, and less painful than MVA. However, some providers avoid the method, fearing the risk of failure and time to receive results. In central Malawi, most women who receive the treatment say the treatment was supportive and satisfactory and that they prefer it to surgical treatment. Some women have reported drug failure, sometimes after buying the drug from local pharmacies when it was unavailable at the hospital.

As of 2015, the median cost of PAC is $40, and the cost of treatment with D&C is 29% higher than with MVA. Surgical treatment is required in 16% of cases but comprises 49% of costs.

== See also ==
- Abortion in Africa
- Health in Malawi
- Human rights in Malawi
- Rape in Malawi
