= Peter Adrian Chifukwa =

Malawian Catholic prelate

- Bishop of Dedza
- Church: Roman Catholic Church
- Archdiocese: Lilongwe
- See: Dedza
- Appointed: 8 May 2021
- Installed: 28 August 2021
- Predecessor: Emmanuel Cosmas Kanyama
- Successor: Incumbent

Orders
- Ordination: 12 June 2004
- Consecration: 28 August 2021 by Archbishop Thomas Luke Msusa
- Rank: Bishop

Personal details
- Born: Peter Adrian Chifukwa; 27 August 1973 (age 53) Msampha Village, Diocese of Lilongwe, Malawi
- Motto: “I am the way the truth and the life”

Styles of Peter Adrian Chifukwa
- Reference style
- Religious style: Bishop

Peter Adrian Chifukwa (born 27 August 1973), is a Roman Catholic prelate in Malawi, who serves as the Bishop of the Roman Catholic Diocese of Dedza. He was appointed as bishop by Pope Francis on 8 May 2021.

== Early life and education ==
He was born on 27 August 1973 in Msampha Village, Dedza District, in the Archdiocese of Lilongwe. He attended primary schools in his home area. From 1991 until 1994, he attended Mchisu Community Day Secondary School, for his secondary school education.

He studied philosophy at St. Anthony Major Seminary, in Kachebere, Mchinji District, starting in September 1994. In 1997 he transferred to St. Peters Major Seminary, in Zomba where he studied Theology. He also holds a Licentiate of Canon Law awarded by the Catholic University of Eastern Africa, Nairobi, Kenya in 2010.

== Priesthood ==
He was ordained a deacon on 12 January 2004 at Dedza by Bishop Rémi Joseph Gustave Sainte-Marie, Bishop of Dedza. Bishop Rémi Joseph Gustave Sainte-Marie ordained him a priest at Bembeke Cathedral in Dedza on 12 June 2004.

Father Peter Adrian Chifukwa served in various roles as a priest of the Roman Catholic Diocese of Dedza. Those roles included:

- Assistant parish priest at Dedza Parish from 2004 until 2005
- Parish priest of Ganya Parish, Kande, from 2005 until 2007
- Bishop's secretary at Dedza from 2010 until 2011
- Rector of St Kizito Minor Seminary since 2011
- Member of Bishop's counsellors Dedza Diocese
- Chaplain to the Presentation of the Virgin Mary Sisters
- Judicial vicar in Dedza Diocese (ministry that looks after marriage annulments).

== As bishop ==
On 8 May 2021, Pope Francis appointed him bishop of the Roman Catholic Diocese of Dedza. He was consecrated as bishop on 28 August 2021 at Dedza, by Archbishop Thomas Luke Msusa, Archbishop of Blantyre assisted by Bishop Martin Anwel Mtumbuka, Bishop of Karonga and Bishop George Desmond Tambala, Bishop of Zomba. Since then he serves as the Bishop of Dedza Diocese.

== See also ==
- Catholic Church in Malawi

== Succession table ==
Catholic Church titles
Preceded by Emmanuel Cosmas Kanyama (2007–2018)	Bishop of Dedza; Since 8 May 2021	Succeeded by Incumbent
