= Alfred Mateyu Chaima =

Malawian Roman Catholic prelate

- Bishop
- Church: Catholic Church
- Archdiocese: Roman Catholic Archdiocese of Blantyre
- See: Roman Catholic Diocese of Zomba
- Appointed: 5 June 2023
- Term ended: Incumbent
- Predecessor: George Desmond Tambala
- Successor: Incumbent

Orders
- Ordination: 4 July 1998
- Consecration: 12 August 2023 by George Desmond Tambala
- Rank: Bishop

Personal details
- Born: Alfred Mateyu Chaima; 14 July 1970 (age 54); Nambera, Archdiocese of Blantyre, Malawi

Styles of Alfred Mateyu Chaima
- Reference style: His Grace; The Most Reverend
- Spoken style: Your Grace
- Religious style: Bishop

Alfred Mateyu Chaima (born 14 July 1970) is a Malawian Catholic prelate who is the Bishop of the Diocese of Zomba in Malawi.

== Background and education ==
He was born on 14 July 1970 in Nambera, Lilongwe District, in the Central Region of Malawi. He attended primary school in his home area. He attended St. Pius XII Seminary for his secondary school education. Later he joined Kachebere Major Seminary for philosophical studies. He then continued to study theology at St. Peters Major Seminary in Zomba. He holds a Licentiate and a Doctor of Philosophy, both in pastoral theology and both awarded by the Catholic University of Eastern Africa, in Nairobi, Kenya.

== Priesthood ==
He was ordained a deacon at Zomba on 19 January 1998. He was ordained a priest on 4 July 1998 at the Cathedral in Blantyre by Archbishop James Chiona, Archbishop of Blantyre.

While a priest of Blantyre he served in various roles including as:

- Teacher, formator and rector at Pius XII Minor Seminary
- Pastoral Secretary of Archdiocese of Blantyre
- Director of Nantipwiri Pastoral Centre
- Chairman of Board of Christian Health Association (CHAM)
- Lecturer at the University of Malawi
- Part time Lecturer at Catholic University of Malawi
- Part time Lecturer at the Catholic University of Eastern Africa
- Part time Lecturer at Tangaza College, in Kenya
- Part time Lecturer at Ggaba Pastoral Institute of Eastern Africa, in Eldoret, Kenya
- Secretary General of the Episcopal Conference of Malawi at the Catholic Secretariat, in Lilongwe.

== As bishop ==
On 5 June 2023 Pope Francis appointed Father Alfred Mateyu Chaima, as Bishop of the Diocese of Zomba. He was consecrated bishop and installed on 12 August 2023 at the Grounds of Zomba Catholic Secondary School, Diocese of Zomba, Malawi. The Principal Consecrator was Archbishop George Desmond Tambala, Archbishop of Lilongwe assisted by Archbishop Thomas Luke Msusa, Archbishop of Blantyre and Bishop Peter Adrian Chifukwa, Bishop of Dedza.

== See also ==
- Catholic Church in Malawi
- Vincent Frederick Mwakhwawa

== Succession table ==
Catholic Church titles
Preceded by George Desmond Tambala (15 October 2015 - 15 October 2021)	Bishop of Zomba; 5 June 2023 – present	Succeeded by Incumbent
