= List of Catholic dioceses in Malawi =

The Roman Catholic Church in Malawi is composed of two ecclesiastical provinces and 6 suffragan dioceses.

== List of dioceses ==
=== Episcopal Conference of Malawi ===
==== Ecclesiastical Province of Blantyre ====
- Archdiocese of Blantyre
  - Diocese of Chikwawa
  - Diocese of Mangochi
  - Diocese of Zomba

==== Ecclesiastical Province of Lilongwe ====
- Archdiocese of Lilongwe
  - Diocese of Dedza
  - Diocese of Karonga
  - Diocese of Mzuzu
