= Peter Martin Musikuwa =

Malawian Catholic prelate

The Most Reverend Peter Martin Musikuwa
- Bishop of Chikwawa
- Church: Catholic Church
- Archdiocese: Blantyre
- See: Chikwawa
- Appointed: 16 April 2003
- Installed: 28 June 2003
- Predecessor: Felix Eugenio Mkhori

Orders
- Ordination: 28 June 2003
- Consecration: 13 May 2022 by Orlando Antonini

Personal details
- Born: Peter Martin Musikuwa; 3 April 1952 (age 74) Kalimtulo, Chikwawa District, Diocese of Chikwawa, Malawi

Peter Martin Musikuwa (born 3 April 1952) is a Malawian prelate of the Catholic Church who was appointed bishop of the Roman Catholic Diocese of Chikwawa on 16 April 2003 by Pope John Paul II.

== Early life and education ==
He was born on 3 April 1952 in Kalimtulo, Chikwawa District, Diocese of Chikwawa, Malawi.

== Priest ==
He was ordained priest of Chikwawa Diocese on 12 July 1982. While a priest, he served as the Spiritual Director at St Peter's Major Seminary in Zomba, Malawi.

== Bishop ==
On 16 April 2003, Pope John Paul II appointed Peter Martin Musikuwa, until then priest of the diocese of Chikwawa, as bishop of Chikwawa Diocese, Malawi.

He was consecrated and installed on 28 June 2003, at the hands of Archbishop Orlando Antonini, Titular Archbishop of Formiae and Papal Nuncio assisted by Archbishop Tarcisius Gervazio Ziyaye, Archbishop of Blantyre and Bishop Felix Eugenio Mkhori, Bishop of Lilongwe.

In February 2018 the Episcopal Conference of Malawi (ECM), elected him chairman of the "Liturgical Commission, Pastoral Commission (Evangelization and Catechesis), and Pontifical Mission Societies (PMS)".

== See also ==
- Catholic Church in Malawi

== Succession table ==
Catholic Church titles
Preceded by Felix Eugenio Mkhori (12 February 1979 to 23 January 2001)	Bishop of Chikwawa; Since 16 April 2013	Succeeded by Incumbent
