= Vincent Frederick Mwakhwawa =

Malawian Catholic prelate

- Auxiliary Bishop of Lilongwe
- Church: Roman Catholic Church
- Archdiocese: Lilongwe
- See: Lilongwe
- Appointed: 15 November 2023
- Installed: 20 January 2024
- Predecessor: Tarcisius Gervazio Ziyaye

Orders
- Ordination: 12 July 2003
- Consecration: 20 January 2024 by Archbishop George Desmond Tambala
- Rank: Bishop

Personal details
- Born: Vincent Frederick Mwakhwawa; 20 November 1975 (age 50) Salima, Diocese of Lilongwe, Malawi

Styles of Vincent Frederick Mwakhwawa
- Reference style
- Religious style: Bishop

Vincent Frederick Mwakhwawa is a Roman Catholic prelate in Malawi, who serves as the Auxiliary Bishop of the Roman Catholic Archdiocese of Lilongwe. He was appointed as bishop and by Pope Francis on 15 November 2023. He was assigned the title of Titular Bishop of Aquae Thibilitanae.

== Early life and education ==
He was born on 20 November 1975 in Salima, in the Archdiocese of Lilongwe. He studied philosophy at Saint Anthony's Seminary in Kachebere, Mchinji District, Central Region, Malawi. He then studied Theology at Saint Peter's Major Seminary in Zomba. He holds a Master's degree in Pastoral Theology, awarded by the Catholic University of Eastern Africa in Nairobi, Kenya, in 2012.

== Priesthood ==
He was ordained a priest on 12 July 2003 at Lilongwe. Father Vincent Frederick Mwakhwawa served in various roles as a priest of the Roman Catholic Archdiocese of Lilongwe. Those roles included:

- Vicar for Namitete Parish in 2003
- Vicar for Likuni Parish from 2003 until 2005
- Parish Priest in Likuni from 2005 until 2006
- Secretary to the bishop from 2006 until 2007
- Parish priest of Saint Patrick Parish from 2008 until 2010
- Teacher and formator at the Kachebere Major Seminary from 2012 until 2013
- National director of the Pontifical Mission Societies since 2014
- Chaplain of the National Catholic Laity since 2014
- Member of the College of Consultors since 2014
- Vicar General of the Archdiocese of Lilongwe since 2013.

== As bishop ==
He was appointed auxiliary bishop of the Roman Catholic Archdiocese of Lilongwe, on 16 November 2023. He was simultaneously appointed as Titular Bishop of Aquae Thibilitanae.

He was consecrated as bishop on 20 January 2024 at Lilongwe, by Archbishop George Desmond Tambala, Archbishop of Lilongwe, assisted by Archbishop Gian Luca Perici, Titular Archbishop of Volsinium and Papal Nuncio and Bishop John Alphonsus Ryan, Bishop of Mzuzu. Since then he has served as the Auxiliary Bishop of Lilongwe Archdiocese.

== See also ==
- Catholic Church in Malawi
- Alfred Mateyu Chaima

== Succession table ==
Catholic Church titles
Preceded by Tarcisius Gervazio Ziyaye; Coadjutor Bishop (1993–1994)	Auxiliary Bishop of Lilongwe; Since 15 November 2023	Succeeded by Incumbent
