= Maula Cathedral =

- Maula Cathedral
- Location: Lilongwe
- Country: Malawi
- Denomination: Roman Catholic Church

Administration
- Archdiocese: Roman Catholic Archdiocese of Lilongwe

The Maula Cathedral which is also known as the Our Lady of Africa Cathedral or simply the Cathedral of Lilongwe, is a Catholic church and the seat of the Archdiocese of Lilongwe, located in the capital and largest city of the African country of Malawi. Administratively it is in the Central Region, near the M1 highway and the Civo Stadium.

The cathedral follows the Roman Rite and is under the pastoral responsibility of the Archbishop George Desmond Tambala and his Auxiliary Bishop Vincent Mwakhwawa. The parish priests are Fr Louis Chikanya and Fr Mkwezalamba. The church is under the patronage of Our Lady of Africa.

== See also ==
- Catholic Church in Malawi
