= Cornelius Chitsulo =

fair use image

Cornelius Chitsulo (born Mua, Nyasaland, 19 December 1909; died Dedza, Malawi, 28 February 1984) was a Malawian Roman Catholic priest and Bishop of Dedza from 1959 to 1984.

== Early life ==
Chitsulo was born in a village named Njolo, near Mua in what was then the British protectorate of Nyasaland. The Mua Mission was an early center of Catholic evangelism in Malawi, with the first church being built there in 1905. From 1922 to 1937 Chitsulo studied at the mission in Kipalapala in Tanganyika Territory, and on 5 September 1937 was consecrated, by some accounts the first native central African Catholic priest.

== Career ==
On 9 November 1956 Chitsulo was appointed as apostolic vicar of Dedza and titular bishop of Bonitza. On 25 April 1959 Dedza was promoted to a bishopric and he was appointed Bishop of Dedza, a title he held until his death in 1984. He was the first native central African bishop in Nyasaland (later Malawi).

While bishop, Chitsulo built schools and hospitals in the diocese. He also founded the Congregation of the Presentation of the Virgin Mary Sisters based in Dedza.

Chitsulo is buried in Bembeke Cemetery.
