= Lucious Grandson Kanyumba =

Malawian politician

Lucious Grandson Kanyumba is a politician who has served in ministerial positions in Malawi. He was appointed Minister of Youth Development and Sports in the cabinet of Malawi in June 2009. He later served as Minister of Education.

== Life ==
Lucious Grandson Kanyumba was born in 1972. He attended St Kizito Seminary, Dedza, and then the University of Malawi, Chancellor College. In 1995 he obtained an MSc in Environmental Sciences, and became a teacher at Balaka Secondary School. In 1996 he was appointed an Executive director for Andiamo Youth Cooperative trust. Kanyumba qualified for a Doctor of Philosophy Degree in Biological Sciences in April 2009. He operates a hardware shop in Mangochi and is involved in crop produce and transportation.

Kanyumba joined the Democratic Progressive Party (DPP) in 2005, became the Regional Governor for the Eastern Region in July 2008, and in February 2009 became 2nd Deputy National Director for Youth on the DPP National Governing Council. Kanyumba was elected Member of Parliament for Ntcheu Bwanje South on 19 May 2009. He beat the incumbent Marjorie Nhaunje who had been the Minister for Health.

Kanyumba was appointed Minister of Youth Development and Sports in the cabinet that became effective on 15 June 2009. He retained this position in the cabinet announced on 9 August 2010.

Later, as Minister of Education, he issued in March 2014 a controversial decision to change the language of instruction policy for Malawian schools to English-only.
