= Chitsulo =

Chitsulo is a surname occurring in Malawi. Notable people with the surname include:

- Cornelius Chitsulo (1909-1984), Malawian bishop
- Daniel Chitsulo (born 1983), Malawian footballer
- Joyce Chitsulo (1978–2025), Malawian politician
- Princess Chitsulo (born 1981), Malawian gospel singer, activist, and businesswoman
