= Kungoni =

Malawian non-profit organization

Coordinates: 14°16′50″S 34°30′35″E

Kungoni Centre of Culture and Art
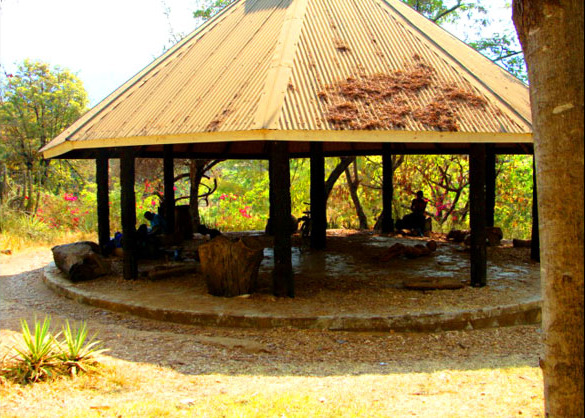
- Type: Non-for-profit Organization
- Headquarters: Malawi
- Key people: Claude Boucher Chisale

The Kungoni (also spelled KuNgoni) Centre of Culture and Art is a non-profit organization in central Malawi. Kungoni is located in Mua, a village in the Dedza district, about 60 km from Salima. Kungoni is both easily accessible, being about two hours drive on bitumen from Lilongwe and three from Blantyre. Kungoni sits a little above the lake plain, with views to the lake in one direction and the African Rift Valley escarpment in the other. The site is landscaped and planted as a botanic garden with a variety of tropical trees and shrubs.

== Overview ==
The Kungoni Centre was established by the White Father Claude Boucher Chisale with the intention of giving the local carvers training in a variety of artistic forms with the intention of improving local incomes. Besides the carvings, the Kungoni Centre has also developed a culture sector which includes the Chamare Museum, the research centre, local traditional dancing troupe and cultural courses. The centre employs over 120 carvers and is just setting up a new project called Kumbewu (The Seed). Kumbewu will offer skill training for women and serve as a site for various information sessions including Aids education, agricultural diversification, money management and more.

== The Mua Mission ==
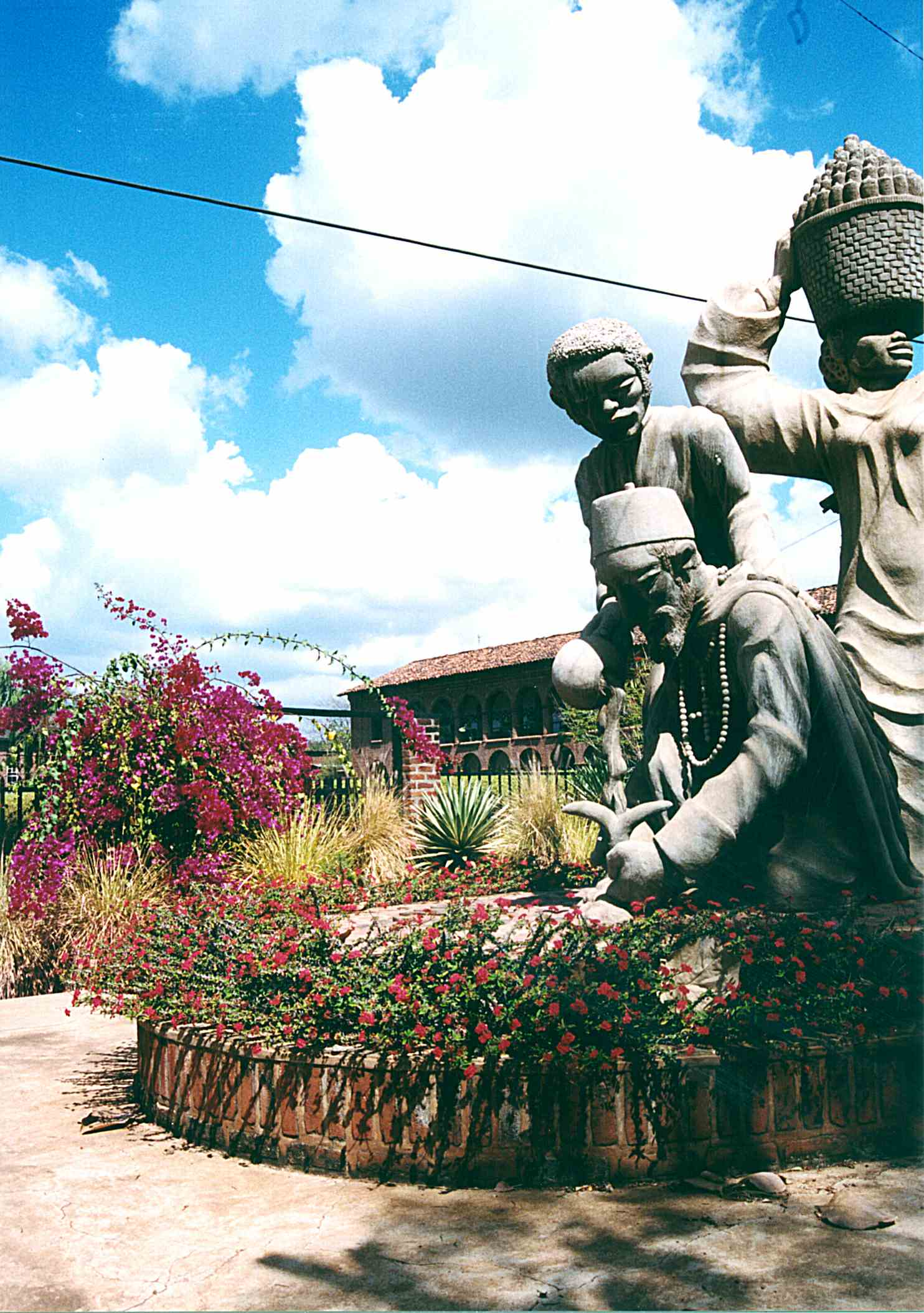
Mua Mission.

The Mua Mission was founded by the White Fathers in 1902 when the buildings of the first big mission house were built and which still stand today. The first church was finished in 1905 and opened at Christmas. The church which is used today was established in 1971 on the same ground and a lot of things of the old church have been adopted. The Kungoni Centre has been created by Father Claude Boucher Chisale in 1976, after Father Boucher already worked with artists in Nsipe. Originally it was just set up as a project of helping the local artists but the cultural part developed.

== Carving Centre ==
Father Boucher founded the Carving Centre to teach the local artists new techniques. The Carving Centre is used by the experienced carvers to teach young artists. The artworks are sold with a fair price for the carvers so they can support their families. In 2009 the art gallery was opened to give a sense of the carving history. The gallery documents, the thirty years of work performed in the community and the advancement of the themes and craftsmanship of the pieces. The Kungoni carvings are that popular, that it is even possible to find some in the Vatican museum and in the Buckingham Palace and in Churches and private collections in Africa, Europe, and North America.

== Cultural offerings ==
=== Chamare Museum ===
The Chamare Museum provides the visitor with an introduction to the richness of the Chewa, Ngoni and Yao cultures of central and southern Malawi, as well as a little on the Batwa people, the original and now vanished inhabitants of Malawi. The Museum has three rooms containing photographs, text panels, and displays of objects from the three cultures. There is also some coverage of the early history of missions in the Mua area.

The museum also displays Nyau masks. Nyau or Gule wamkulu is the ‘great dance’ of the Nyau secret societies of the Chewa. Gule wamkulu was declared a ‘Masterpiece of the Oral and Intangible Heritage of Humanity’ by UNESCO in 2005. Kungoni provides one of the best places in Malawi to learn some of the stories of Gule wamkulu.

Chamare Museum also provides detailed information on the rituals and rights of passage for the Chewa, Ngoni, and Yao people. It also chronicles, the history of the White Fathers mission work in Malawi dating back to 1902. Included in the collection are the many years of field work and the gathering of cultural material and is the most extensive display for explaining to Malawians and visitors the cultural history of the three main tribal groups.

=== Courses ===
The centre offers cultural courses. This courses combine the knowledge of Father Boucher, who has been a resident of Malawi for forty years, and his European view on the things. The cultural course offers Ngo's and faith based aid workers an orientation and inside into Malawian priorities and local realities. The course hopes to focus outsiders sensitively and effectively deliver their programs.

=== Kafukufuku, the Research Centre ===
The Kungoni Centre includes its own research centre, which archives huge amounts of information about the tribes, such as photographs, videos, books, and notices. There is general access to the Kafukufuku.

=== Dances ===
One thing that is difficult to be seen for tourists in Malawi are the traditional dances even though they are an important part of the country's culture. The Kungoni Centre records, describes and performs these dances and it is even possible to take part.

=== Kumbewu ===
The Project Kumbewu supports local women and helps them in gaining financial independence. They create decorative jewelry and useful accessories made out of natural materials (seeds, plants) which are sold at the centre. The money they earn represents important additional income for the family and leads to an improved life situation. Above this the Kumbewu site offers courses dealing with topics of local concerns (Health, food, and agriculture). Most important Kumbewu is a place for solidarity and exchanging of the ideas between women.

=== Namalikhate Chalets ===
The Centre provides small chalets for travelers and visitor interested in the local culture.

== Notable artists ==
- Akimontondo
- Kay Chiromo
- Jibu Sani
- Eugene Mpira

== Address ==
The centre's address is Box 41, Mtakataka, Malawi.

== Sources ==
- "Malawi Tourism". malawitourism.com. Archived from the original on 27 August 2014.
- "chambografix.com". Archived from the original on 2012-03-03.
