= Patrick Kalilombe =

Roman Catholic theologian

Patrick Augustine Kalilombe M. Afr.
- Bishop of Lilongwe
- Installed: 6 May 1972
- Term ended: 20 December 1979
- Predecessor: Joseph Fady
- Successor: Matthias A. Chimole

Personal details
- Born: 28 August 1933 Mua, Malawi
- Died: 25 September 2012 (aged 79)

Patrick Augustine Kalilombe (28 August 1933 – 25 September 2012) was a Roman Catholic theologian who was the Bishop of Lilongwe from 1972 to 1979.

Kalilombe was born in Mua, Malawi [then Nyasaland]. He was ordained a priest with the White Fathers in 1958, and joined the staff at Kachebere Seminary in 1964, being appointed rector in 1968. In 1972 he was ordained Bishop of Lilongwe Diocese in Malawi, but in 1976 a conflict arose between the church and the government of Hastings Banda. According to Kalilombe himself, the church was accused of "forming clandestine subversive groups which were working against the party and did not show respect and obedience to the Life President." Kalilombe was asked to leave the country, and when he did return briefly in July 1976, he was placed under house arrest. However, he did not resign as bishop until 1979. Margaret Hebblethwaite suggests that "several years later the bishops of Malawi supported the view that Kalilombe would not be welcomed back."

Kalilombe obtained a Ph.D. from the University of California, Berkeley before taking up an appointment as Third World Lecturer in the Mission Department of the Selly Oak Colleges in Birmingham. In 1987 he became Director of the Ecumenical Centre for Black and White Christian Partnership.

He had been described as the "darling of Catholic progressives in Britain."
