= Anne Phoya =

Malawian public health nurse and midwife

Ann(e) Phoya
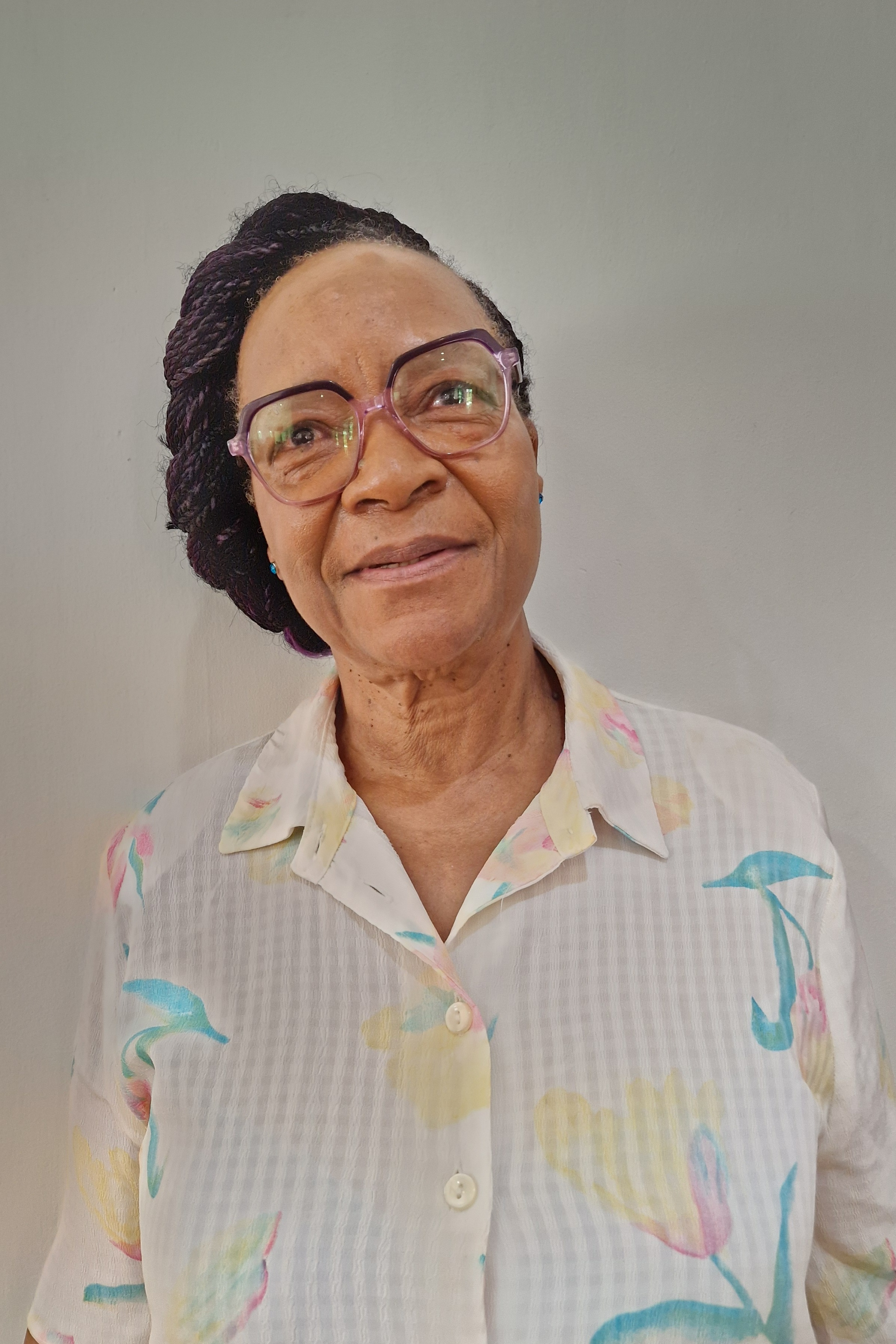
- Dr Anne Phoya in 2026
- Education: Catholic University of America
- Occupations: midwife, nurse, leader
- Known for: Malawian midwives advocate

Anne Phoya or Ann Phoya is a Malawian public health nurse and midwife. She was President of the Malawian Association of midwives and she became the chair of the Malawi Scotland Partnership.

== Life ==
Phoya trained as a public health nurse and midwife. She was a Fulbright Scholar and in 1993 she graduated from the Catholic University of America in Washington, DC.

After a long career in public health, she retired in 2013 and worked for four years for the University of North Carolina's Malawi Program. She led their Safe Motherhood Project which was underwritten by the Bill and Melinda Gates Foundation.

In 2014 she became the President of the Malawian Association of Midwives. The judge Esme Chombo led the Special Law Commission on Abortion which reported in 2015 recommending the decriminalisation of abortion. Phoya was one of the ten commissioners. The more liberal approach they recommended extended the circumstances where abortion could be permitted that included rape and incest. It did not include financial considerations. Phoya noted that this would be a significant relaxation because Malawi was a poor country so many could use this as justification. The change to the law was not made even though unsafe abortions are estimated to cause between 6 and 18% of all maternal deaths.

Phoya spoke out about the poor state of midwifery in Malawi. She said that the government trained nurses and midwives but they failed to retain them. The midwives lacked essential tools. At one labour room she visited in 2016 there was no mains electricity or water. The midwife therefore arrived with a bucket of water to be used to wash equipment during a birth. Phoya was quoted as summarising the situation on International Day of the Midwife in 2016 as "pathetic". In 2018 the Association of Malawian Midwives launched an International Confederation of Midwives initiative called 10,000 Happy Birthdays in the capital, Lilongwe. It planned to train 1,500 new midwives in Malawi. Phoya continued to advocate for better midwife conditions as president until 2020.

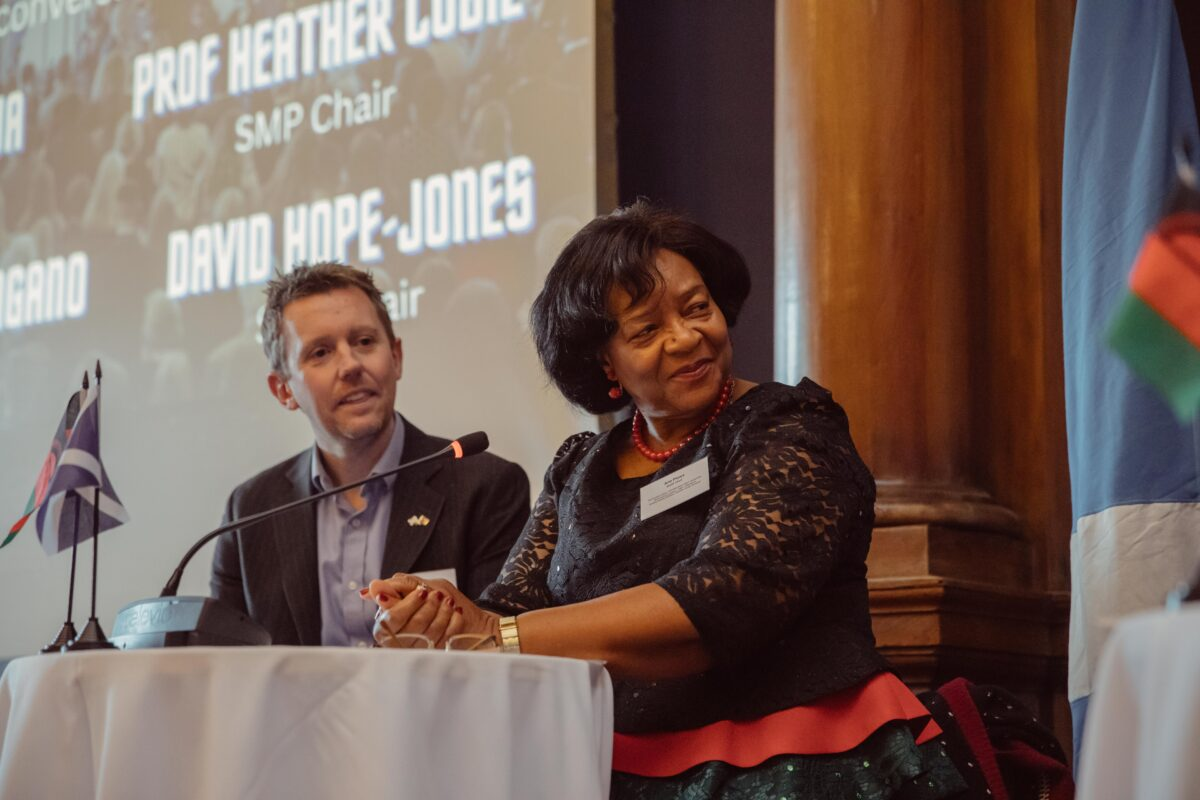
Phoya, chair of the Malawi Scotland Partnership in 2022.

Phoya became the chair of the Malawi Scotland Partnership and in 2019 and 2022 she was in Edinburgh reporting at the Scotland Malawi Partnership AGM.

During the COVID-19 pandemic in Malawi she was involved with the Organized Network of Services for Everyone’s Health Activity. She reported that some midwives were demanding PPE before they cared for mothers but Phoya felt that they had to persevere. They were having to separate those who were infected from those who were not. The need to identify the contacts of COVID-19 patients was a difficult task.

At the beginning of 2025 there was a renewed debate about the possibility of bringing in compulsory national health insurance. This was encouraged by the reduction in American subsidies which would hit health. Phoya support for the idea was quoted and she said that it would also assist in funding healthcare workers.

== Publication ==
- Setting Strategic Health Sector Priorities in Malawi (et al.)
