= Alessandro Pagani =

Italian Roman Catholic bishop

Alessandro Pagani S.M.M.
- Bishop Emeritus of Mangochi
- Church: Catholic Church
- Diocese: Diocese of Mangochi
- In office: 3 April 2007 – 6 December 2013
- Predecessor: Luciano Nervi
- Successor: Montfort Stima

Orders
- Ordination: 13 March 1965
- Consecration: 26 May 2007 by Nicola Girasoli

Personal details
- Born: 3 January 1937 (age 89) Torre Boldone, Province of Bergamo, Kingdom of Italy

Alessandro Pagani (born 3 January 1937) is an Italian Roman Catholic bishop.

Ordained to the priesthood on 13 March 1965, Pagani was named bishop of the Roman Catholic Diocese of Mangochi, Malawi on 3 April 2007 and retired on 6 December 2013.
