= Kay Chiromo =

- Born: Witness Kay Chiromo; December 24, 1951; Blantyre, Malawi
- Died: 1994 (aged 42–43)
- Occupations: Painter, illustrator

Witness Kay Chiromo (December 24, 1951 – 1994) was a Malawian artist and art educator. He was born in Makoka Village, T.A. Chigaru, Blantyre District. He is considered as one of the most talented and respected artists from Malawi. His medium was oil paintings but he also carried out book illustrations and made a video documentary.

== Education and career ==
As an art scholar, Chiromo studied under first generation Malawian wood carvers Akamitondo and Jibu Sani at the KuNgoni Centre of Culture & Art, a mission established by Canadian priest Claude Boucher Chisale who also taught art. He received his Master's in Fine Arts degree from the Pratt Institute, a private art college in New York City, in 1986.

Chiromo went on to teach at the University of Malawi. He rose to senior lecturer and head of the fine art section in the Department of Fine and Performing Arts at Chancellor College. Chiromo has inspired artists around the world including David McCurry who studied under him whilst in Malawi.

== Art ==
Chiromo's oil paintings were sometimes built up with fabric, sand or pebbles to produce a deep relief and three-dimensional effect. He once noted that, "Africans express (themselves) better in three-dimensional arts. He regularly used different canvas shapes straying away from the more traditional rectangular canvas.

=== Notable works ===
- Mother and Child panel, 1993 at Chapel of the White Fathers
- Vocation of the Apostles, 1993 (privately owned)

=== Exhibits ===
Chiromo's paintings became popular internationally in the 1980s. They have been exhibited in galleries and exhibitions in the United States, Zambia, England, Canada and South Africa.

== Publications ==
- The Art of Kay Chiromo: A Memorial and a Celebration of His Work, Malawi National Commission for UNESCO (Book), Chiromo, Kay – 1997
- A Survey of Malawi Articrafts, Chiromo, Kay – 1993
- Visual arts of Malawi [videorecording], Chiromo, Kay −1991

=== Publications by others ===
- A Cameraman's Tale: Focus and Perspective in Kay Chiromo's Visual Arts of Malawi, Journal of Humanities,(Journal), W. Msosa, 1996

== Personal ==
Kay Chiromo died in 1994, but his artistic legacy can be seen throughout Malawi. The UNESCO-sponsored book collection of his work was written by him but published after his death. There was also an annual national literary competition, the 'Kay Chiromo Literary Competition' named in his honour from 1995 to 1999. Award-winning essays from this collection have been published in books such as the 'Wildlife and Environmental Essays: Prize Winning Essays from the Kay Chiromo Competition 1995–1999' Chiromo died in a car accident in 1994.

== See also ==
- Massa Lemu
