= Catholic University of Malawi =

University in Limbe, Malawi

The Catholic University of Malawi
- Motto: Gaudium de Veritate
- Motto in English: Joy About the Truth
- Established: October 16, 2004
- Religious affiliation: Catholic Church
- Academic affiliations: APUMA; ACUHIAM; ACUQA
- Chairman: Archbishop Thomas Luke Msusa
- Chancellor: Archbishop George Desmond Tambala
- Vice-Chancellor: Professor Francis Moto
- Total staff: 170+
- Students: 6000+
- Postgraduates: 12
- Location: Nguludi, Chiradzulu District, Malawi; 15°49′35″S 35°10′35″E
- Colours: Blue, white, yellow & red
- Website: www.cunima.ac.mw

The Catholic University of Malawi is a fast-growing institution of higher learning accredited by the National Council for Higher Education (NCHE) to offer Degrees, Diplomas, and Certificates. It was established by the Episcopal Conference of Malawi on October 16, 2004, and officially opened its doors in 2006. The university has seven faculties, namely Education, Law, Theology, Social Sciences, Science, Commerce and, Nursing and Midwifery.

The Catholic Church has been involved in education in Malawi for over a hundred years. Its first school was established on 2 February 1902 at Nzama in Ntcheu District by three Montfort Missionaries: Fr. Pierre Bourget SMM (Superior), Fr. Augustine Prezeau SMM (who later became the first Apostolic Prefect of Shire) and Fr. Anton Winnen SMM, in charge of the first Catholic primary school in the country which he used to call ‘The University of Nzama’. The ‘University’ started with eight students – men, women, and children aged between six and sixty years.

In spite of so many setbacks, by the late 1950s, the Catholic Church ran 1249 of the 2884 primary schools in Nyasaland (Malawi), and of the 24 grant-aided secondary schools and teacher training colleges, 13 were run by the Catholic Church.Just as the Church's achievements at the primary school level necessitated the establishment of Catholic secondary schools in the fifties, its achievements at the secondary school level called for the establishment of a Catholic University.

It is against this background that on 15 September 2004, the Bishops sent the chairperson for Education to meet the then Minister of Education to, among other things, alert him about the Episcopal Conference of Malawi's intention to request the FIC Brothers to turn Montfort Teachers Training College into a Catholic University.

The then Minister of Education, Hon. Yusuf Mwawa, warmly welcomed the idea. In addition, he asked the then Principal Secretary for Education (Dr S.A. Hau) to arrange that one or two officers be included in the taskforce of the Catholic University to assist in the establishment of the university. This was indeed done and a number of task force meetings were attended by a representative of the Principal Secretary. In partnership with the Malawi Government, through the Ministry of Education, on 28 October 2006, the State President, late professor Bingu wa Mutharika officially opened The Catholic University of Malawi.

Since then, student enrolment has steadily increased from 129 to 4000 plus students by 2020. The university was accredited in January 2009. In seven years of its existence, CUNIMA has officiated nineteen graduations. The university is into an affiliation agreement with the Inter Congregational Institute (ICI), and affiliation with other institutions of higher learning namely, Kachebere and St Peter's Major Seminaries.

== Alumni ==
Veronica Ndalama MP for Blantyre South from 2025

== See also ==
- List of universities in Malawi
- Education in Malawi
