= Episcopal Conference of Malawi =

Assembly of Catholic bishops

The Episcopal Conference of Malawi (ECM), established in 1961, is the episcopal conference of the Catholic Church in Malawi. Constituent bodies of the ECM are: the plenary assembly of bishops, the Catholic Secretariat and six committees (Catholic development, justice and peace, education, health, pastoral care and communications).

The conference involves the bishops of Blantyre, Chikwawa, Dedza, Karonga, Lilongwe, Mangochi, Mzuzu and Zomba.

The ECM is a member of the Association of Member Episcopal Conferences in Eastern Africa (AMECEA) and Symposium of Episcopal Conferences of Africa and Madagascar (SECAM).

== List of presidents of the Bishops' Conference ==
- 1966–1967: John Baptist Hubert Theunissen, Archbishop of Blantyre
- 1969–1980: James Chiona, Archbishop of Blantyre
- 1980–1984: Felix Eugenio Mkhori, Bishop of Chikwawa
- 1984–1994: James Chiona, Archbishop of Blantyre
- 1994–2000: Felix Eugenio Mkhori, Bishop of Chikwawa
- 2000–2012: Tarcisius Gervazio Ziyaye, Bishop of Lilongwe and Archbishop of Blantyre
- 2012–2015: Joseph Mukasa Zuza, Bishop of Mzuzu
- 2015–2022: Thomas Luke Msusa, Archbishop of Blantyre
- 2022–present: George Desmond Tambala, Archbishop of Lilongwe

== See also ==
- Catholic Church in Malawi
