= Massa Lemu =

Malawi visual artist

Massa Lemu is a visual artist and writer from Malawi who works in painting, drawing, performance and text-based conceptual work. He has described his art as "interventions and descriptions of the disputed social space we all live in".

== Early life and education ==
Massa Lemu was born in 1979 in Blantyre. His early artistic influence was his late uncle, David Zuze, who Lemu watched painting as a hobby while he was younger.

Lemu received his Bachelor of Education Degree (with a major in Fine Arts) from the University of Malawi in 2003 and Master of Arts in Painting from the Savannah College of Art and Design (USA) in 2009.

== Work ==
Lemu's paintings include combinations of natural, human-made, and imaginary aspects as part of commenting on issues. His performance work includes using street corners and other sites often occupied by undocumented people, as part of work about migration.

Lemu has shown his work in galleries in Malawi and the United States. His work has been reviewed in publications including Texphrastic, Cite (Houston, Texas), Reflections (Blantyre, Malawi) and Steve Chimombo's book titled Aids, Artists and Authors (Zomba, Malawi).

He has taught courses at universities including Virginia Commonwealth University in Richmond, Virginia, and Rice University in Houston, Texas.

Lemu was a Core Critical Studies Fellow in the Glassell School of Art at the Museum of Fine Arts, Houston from 2010 to 2012, where he researched and wrote about contemporary African art. Lemu researched the biopolitics of contemporary African art collectives as a PhD student at Stellenbosch University.

== Exhibitions ==
=== Selected solo exhibitions ===
==== 2013: PRECARIOT (Lawndale Arts Center, Houston) ====
PRECARIOT is a self-portrait of the artist as a continental drifter in perpetual precarity. Precariot is a term that combines the word “proletariat” with “precarious” to describe an emerging “barbarian” class of migrant laborers and professionals living and working precariously, holding temporary underpaid jobs, lacking a political voice and increasingly frustrated by their living and working conditions. Lemu says that he is attracted by its revolutionary aspects, embracing the label and adopting it as his title. For Lemu, the old patriot was proud of, and ready to die for their fatherland. The “precariot,” however, is one whose only possession is the unstable and indeterminate terrain of precarity, staking claims and maneuvering in this uncertain landscape. PRECARIOT focuses on processes of inspection and scrutiny, labeling and branding to highlight the realities of migration.

==== 2012: Passages for the Undocumented (Rice University, Houston) ====
According to Lemu, Passages for the Undocumented began more than a year earlier in response to a practical problem many artists face: a lack of space to showcase their art. Inspired by the panhandlers he encountered, Lemu started to imitate their method, writing his own slogans on cardboard signs and standing on street corners around Houston. The slogans concentrate Lemu's experience as a third-world migrant artist into statements that combine conceptual art practice with transcultural displacement.

==== Stranded Fishes and Masks on Wheelchairs (Malawian Embassy, Washington DC) ====
In Stranded Fishes and Masks on Wheelchairs, the paintings in the exhibition used the Gule Wamkulu Mask of the Chewa peoples of Malawi as a departure point to talk about a range of themes such as inclusion and exclusion, determination and resilience. The show also included pictures that use the image of the fish, chambo in particular, to talk about migration, exploitation, and pollution. The artist was inspired to use the image of the fish as metaphor for migration and pollution when he saw East African Tilapia fishes in the polluted concrete bayous of Houston in 2010.

==== 2006 ====
- This Scourge is also a Mask (French Cultural Center, Blantyre)
- Primal Forces (Capital Hotel, Lilongwe)

==== 2003 ====
- Multiple Suns (French Cultural Center, Blantyre)

=== Selected group exhibitions ===
==== 2013 ====
- Do It. A Hans Ulrich Obrist Collaboration (Houston)
- First Aid Kit (Rice University, Houston)

==== 2012 ====
- Of Other Spaces (Dallas)
- Dallas Biennale (Dallas)

==== 2011 ====
- Houston Art Fair, (Houston)
- Material Traces; Selections from Core 2011 (Dallas)

==== 2009 ====
- An Evenly Measured Space (Savannah)

==== 2008 ====
- 404/912, conceptual works by artists from Atlanta and Savannah (Atlanta)

== Publications ==
As a writer, Lemu has been published in the following:

- 2016: Play and the Profane in Samson Kambalu's Holyballs, Holyballism and (Bookworm) The Fall of Man, Stedelijk Studies
- 2014: For the Ranter the Whole World is a Playground C& online magazine http://www.contemporaryand.com
- 2013: What Part of Love is Universal? C& Magazine
- 2013: Dialogue; The Progress of Love The Menil Collection and Pulitzer Foundation, http://www.theprogressoflove.com
- 2012: Danfo, Molue and the Afropolitan Experience in Emeka Ogboh’s Soundscapes 2011-2012
- CORE Catalogue Museum of Fine Art, Houston

== See also ==
- Kay Chiromo
