= Diocese of Mangochi =

Roman Catholic diocese in Malawi

Coordinates: 14.4811°S 35.2702°E

Diocese of Mangochi Dioecesis Mangociensis

Location
- Country: Malawi
- Metropolitan: Blantyre

Statistics
- Area: 11,385 km^{2} (4,396 sq mi)
- Population: Total; Catholics: (as of 2004); 1,210,000; 217,715 (18.0%)

Information
- Rite: Latin Rite

Current leadership
- Pope: Leo XIV
- Bishop: Monfort Stima (since Friday, 2013.12.06)
- Bishops emeritus: Alessandro Pagani, S.M.M.

The Roman Catholic Diocese of Mangochi (Latin: Mangocien(sis)) is a diocese located in the city of Mangochi in the ecclesiastical province of Blantyre in Malawi.

== History ==
- May 29, 1969: Established as the Apostolic Prefecture of Fort Johnston from the Diocese of Zomba
- September 17, 1973: Promoted as Diocese of Mangochi

== Leadership ==
- Prefect Apostolic of Fort Johnston (Roman rite)
  - Father Alessandro Assolari, S.M.M. (1969.10.03 – 1973.09.17 see below)
- Bishops of Mangochi (Roman rite)
  - Bishop Alessandro Assolari, S.M.M. (see above 1973.09.17 – 2004.11.20)
  - Bishop Luciano Nervi, S.M.M. (2004.11.20 – 2005.03.08)
  - Bishop Alessandro Pagani, S.M.M. (2007.04.03 - 2013.12.06); resigned (under Canon 401.1 of the Latin Rite 1983 Code of Canon Law)
  - Bishop Monfort Stima (2013.12.06 - present); appointed by Pope Francis; formerly, Titular Bishop of Puppi and Auxiliary Bishop of the Roman Catholic Archdiocese of Blantyre

== See also ==
- Roman Catholicism in Malawi
