= Our Lady of Wisdom Cathedral, Blantyre =

Our Lady of Wisdom Cathedral
- Our Lady of Wisdom Cathedral
- 15.8025°S 35.0721°E
- Location: Blantyre
- Country: Malawi
- Denomination: Roman Catholic Church

The Our Lady of Wisdom Cathedral or Cathedral Limbe Our Lady of Wisdom, also simply Cathedral of Blantyre, is a religious building belonging to the Catholic Church and is located in Blantyre the second largest city in the African country of Malawi, in the Southern region.

The temple follows the Roman or Latin rite and serves as headquarters of the Archdiocese of Blantyre (Archidioecesis Blantyrensis) which was created in 1959 by Pope John XXIII by bula Cum fides christiana.

It is under the pastoral responsibility of Archbishop Thomas Luke Msusa. Masses are offered in both English and the local language Chichewa.

== See also ==
- Roman Catholicism in Malawi
- Our Lady of Wisdom Cathedral, Butare
