= Allan Chamgwera =

Malawian Catholic bishop (born 1928)

The Most Reverend Allan Chamgwera
- Bishop Emeritus of Zomba
- Church: Catholic Church
- Diocese: Zomba
- Appointed: 12 February 1981
- Term ended: 7 January 2004
- Predecessor: Matthias A. Chimole
- Successor: Thomas Luke Msusa

Orders
- Ordination: 7 September 1957
- Consecration: 31 May 1981 by Matthias A. Chimole

Personal details
- Born: 30 April 1928 (age 98) Nkhonjiwa, Nyasaland
- Denomination: Catholic

Allan Chamgwera (born 30 April 1928) is a Malawian Catholic prelate who served as the bishop of the Diocese of Zomba from 1981 until his retirement in 2004.

== Early life and priesthood ==
Allan Chamgwera was born on 30 April 1928 in Nkhonjiwa, present-day Malawi.He was ordained a priest on 7 September 1957, beginning a lifelong ministry in the Catholic Church.

== Episcopate ==
Chamgwera was appointed Bishop of the Diocese of Zomba on 12 February 1981. He received episcopal consecration on 31 May 1981, with Matthias A. Chimole serving as the principal consecrator.

During his more than two decades as bishop, Chamgwera oversaw significant spiritual, educational, and pastoral development within the diocese, including the establishment of new parishes, schools, and health centers. His leadership was marked by a commitment to social justice, pastoral sensitivity, and the promotion of vocations to the priesthood and religious life. Under his guidance, the diocese grew both in infrastructure and in service to the faithful.

He retired from active ministry on 7 January 2004, becoming Bishop Emeritus of Zomba.

== Later life and legacy ==
In retirement, Chamgwera remained a respected figure within the Catholic community, offering counsel and spiritual guidance to clergy and laity. In 2024, he celebrated his 96th birthday with a call for greater unity among the clergy and faithful, emphasizing the importance of working together for the mission of the Church.

Chamgwera is also known for being the only surviving co‑author of the Pastoral Letter "Living Our Faith", a document that significantly shaped Malawi's political and social landscape by encouraging democratic reforms and respect for human rights.
