= Jibu Sani =

Malawian sculptor

Jibu Sani is a Malawian sculptor and one of the first generation of wood carvers from Bwanausi. He is a product of a wood carving family and the Mua Mission KuNgoni Art Center. Much of his art had Christian religious themes although he was a Muslim.

== Personal ==
He was born in Bwanausi village. His grandfather was the head of a Muslim community in nearby Chigale village. On one of his grandfathers religious sojourns to Dar es Salaam he learned about the wood carving trade from the Makonde carvers and brought this artistic trade to Malawi.

== Art career ==
He was second to Malawian artist Akimatondo in terms of artistic talent. He helped train many talented Malawian artists including Kay Chiromo.

== Artwork ==
- Maria in Erwartung, Mua, Malawi, 1991
- Lectern, parish church in Mthawira. Mthawira Hill is on the outskirts of Blantyre.
