= Alessandro Assolari =

Italian Roman Catholic bishop

Alessandro Assolari (26 August 1928 – 13 April 2005) was an Italian Roman Catholic bishop.

Ordained to the priesthood on 13 March 1954 as a member of the Missionaries of the Company of Mary, Assolari was a priest in Madagascar from then until he moved to Malawi in 1961. He became the first vicar apostolic prefect of Mangochi, a predominantly Islamic area, in 1969. Assolari was named bishop of the Roman Catholic Diocese of Mangochi, Malawi on 8 December 1973. He signed the pastoral letter of March 1992, contributing to political reform in Malawi. He retired on 20 November 2004 and died on 13 April 2005.
