= Christian Health Association of Malawi =

Malawian health organization

- Abbreviation: CHAM
- Founded: December 1, 1966; 59 years ago
- Founded at: Lilongwe, Malawi
- Type: NGO
- Legal status: charity
- Purpose: To provide quality, affordable and accessible gender-sensitive health services for the poor
- Location: Malawi
- Executive Directors: Happy Makala; Rose Kumwenda-Ng'oma
- Director, Finance and Administration: Innocencia Chirombo
- Head of Finance: Mary Chinga
- Project Manager: Mafasy Sesani
- Website: cham.org.mw

The Christian Health Association of Malawi (CHAM) is a non-governmental healthcare organisation in Malawi that seeks to ensure that all people have access to high-quality and affordable health services. According to its official website, the organisation claims to provide 30% of Malawi's healthcare services and trains up to 80% of Malawi's healthcare providers. It serves in typical rural and urban areas, to less fortunate and most underserved populations. The organisation is a network of church-owned health facilities, hospitals and training colleges with an intention to provide lower-cost health services, as well as promotion of diverse and special healthcare services. It is made of 195 health facilities and 11 training colleges located all over the country.

== Background ==
=== History and formation ===
The organisation was found on 1 December 1966 when two organisations, Episcopal Conference of Malawi (ECM) and Malawi Council of Churches (MCC), registered the Private Hospital Association of Malawi (PHAM), under the Trustees Incorporation Act. These two organisations were formed to help coordinate and facilitate church-supported as well as church-owned healthcare services and training organizations to provide the highest quality care possible in the country. CHAM is co-owned by the Episcopal Conference of Malawi (ECM) as well as the Malawi Council of Churches (MCC). For more than half a century, ECM and MCC have provided healthcare services and trained healthcare professionals in Malawi, with a special focus on providing care to the poor and underserved. Since its formation, CHAM has made available critical care and preventive services to millions of Malawians using its over 190 health facilities and 11 training colleges. The organisation currently claims to provide about 37% of health care services in Malawi. Currently, the organisation is located in Area 14, Off Presidential Road, Lilongwe.

=== Partnership ===
Since the entire organisation is a collaboration of different church institutions and other health organizations, it has also partnered with the Government of Malawi, particularly the Ministry of Health in implementing the Health Sector Strategic Plan, as well as delivery of the essential health packages including training of human resources for health. Other partners include USAID, CDC, as well as PMI.

==== Sources of funds ====
CHAM gets financial and technical support from the government and other development partners, as well as its international partners such as USAID. Its donor partners include Centers for Disease Control and Prevention, United States Agency for International Development, KFW (German Development Bank), Norwegian Embassy, Christian Connections for International Health, DFID, GIZ and Africa Christian Health Associations Platform. In 2020, the Chinese Embassy donated personal protective equipment to the Christian Health Association of Malawi (CHAM) with an intention to protect health workers from COVID-19.

== Objectives and mission ==
The organisation is committed to provide administrative as well as technical support to all its member units in areas to provide quality, affordable and accessible gender-sensitive health services for the poor people. Its main vision is to make sure that all people are able to access high-quality, affordable health services.
