= Veronica Ndalama =

Veronica Pempho Ndalama
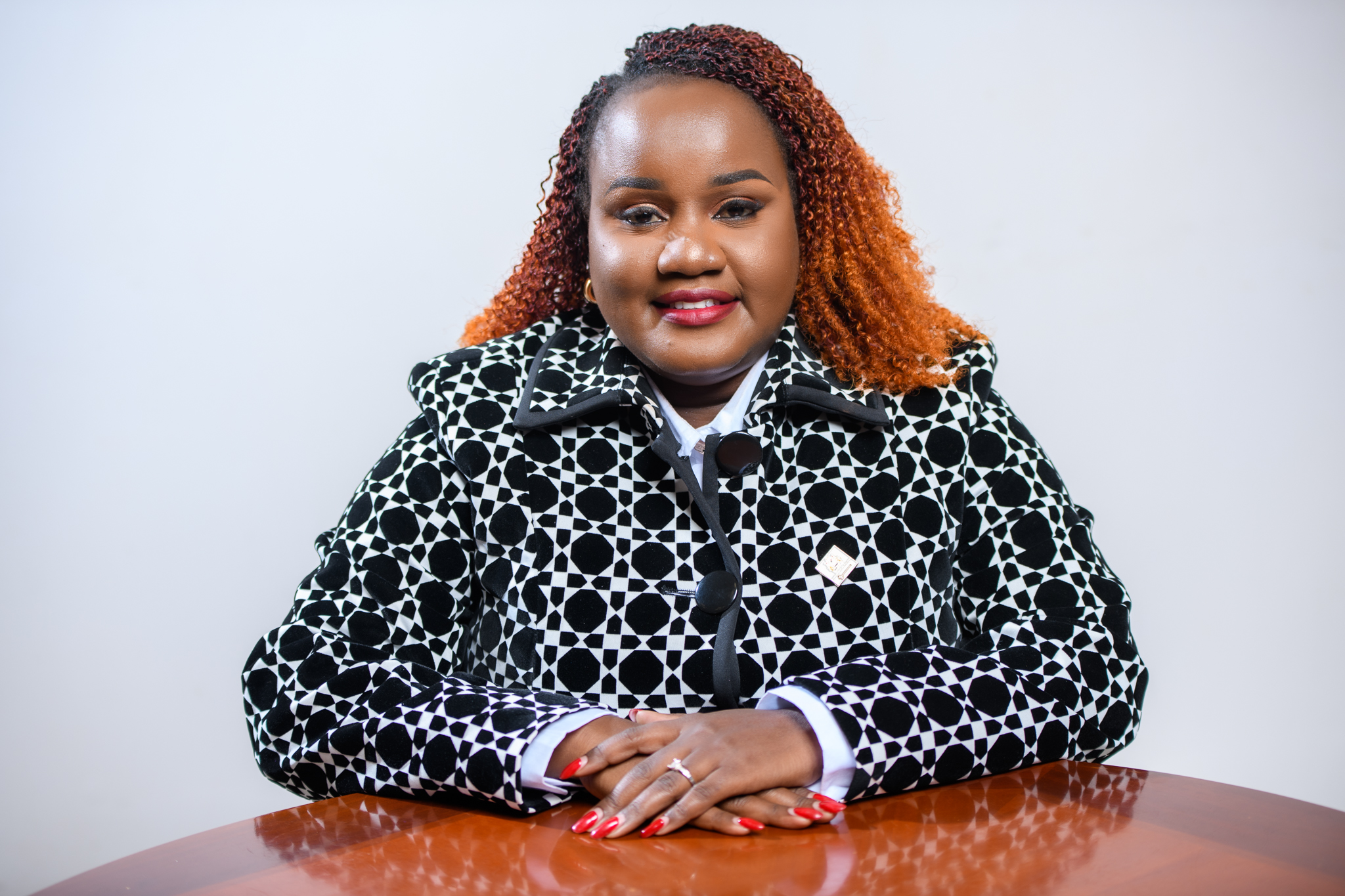
- Ndalama in 2026
- Education: Catholic University of Malawi (Bachelor of Social Sciences (Political Leadership))
- Occupation: Politician
- Known for: Member of Parliament: Blantyre City South Lunzu Constituency
- Term: 2025–present
- Political party: Democratic Progressive Party

Veronica Pempho Ndalama is a Malawian politician who is a member of parliament representing Blantyre City South Lunzu Constituency since 2025. She is a member of the Democratic Progressive Party (DPP) and was elected to the National Assembly in the September 2025 general election.

== Education and professional career ==
Ndalama completed her secondary education at Kamuzu Academy, where she obtained the International General Certificate of Secondary Education (IGCSE). She then studied at the Catholic University of Malawi, graduating with a Bachelor of Social Sciences in Political Leadership in 2013.

Before being elected as Member of Parliament, Ndalama worked in the development sector, with local and international non-governmental organisations, including roles in governance and communications at Pact Malawi.

As of 2026, she was pursuing studies in Law at the University of Malawi's Chancellor College.

== Community involvement ==
Ndalama has been involved in community service through her membership of the Lions Clubs International. In 2020, she served as club President of Lions Club of Mtunthama. The club is involved in charitable works, including among others, distribution of food items and face masks to residents of Kawale Lilongwe in September 2020.

== Political career ==
Ndalama is a member of the Democratic Progressive Party (DPP). She won DPP parliamentary primary elections for Blantyre City South Lunzu Constituency, securing the party's nomination to contest in the September 2025 general election.

She was declared the winner in the elections by the Malawi Electoral Commission, with 8,547 votes. Following the declaration of the results, a petition challenging the result was filed by two independent candidates. The High Court dismissed the petition in November 2025, leaving the election result in place.

Ndalama took her parliamentary oath on 27 October 2025, commencing her service in the 2025-2030 parliamentary term.
