= Jhpiego =

American nonprofit organization

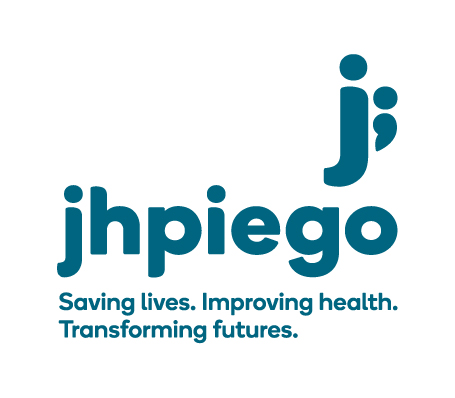
- Founded: 1973; 53 years ago
- Purpose: Healthcare, Malaria, Maternal Health
- Location: Baltimore, Maryland
- Region served: Global
- Method: Donations and Grants
- Key people: Dr. Allyson Bear, President and CEO
- Website: www.jhpiego.org
- Formerly called: Johns Hopkins Program for International Education in Gynecology and Obstetrics

Jhpiego is a nonprofit organization for international health affiliated with Johns Hopkins University. The group was founded in 1973 and initially called the Johns Hopkins Program for International Education in Gynecology and Obstetrics, but is now referred to simply as Jhpiego (pronounced "ja-pie-go").

== Current program areas ==
In its early years, Jhpiego was recognized as an expert in maternal health. As the organization has grown and become more field-based, its programming areas have grown and expanded. As of 2025, Jhpiego's primary program areas are:

- Maternal, newborn, and child health
- HIV/AIDS and tuberculosis
- Malaria prevention and treatment
- Women's cancers
- Adolescent and youth health
- Global Health Security
- Primary health care
- Nursing and midwifery
- Safe surgery
- Learning and performance
- Innovations

== Work in different continents ==
Jhpiego works in over 38 countries throughout Africa, Asia, and the Americas.

=== Africa ===
As of 2023, Jhpiego is actively working in over 30 African countries:

Country	Primary Technical Area(s)
Benin	Malaria Prevention & Treatment
Botswana	HIV/AIDS & TB
Burkina Faso	Adolescent & Youth Health, Global Health Security, Malaria Prevention & Treatment, Women's Cancers
Cameroon	Global Health Security, HIV & TB, Malaria Prevention & Treatment
Chad	HIV & TB, Malaria Prevention & Treatment
Côte d'Ivoire	Adolescent & Youth Health, HIV & TB, Immunization, Malaria Prevention & Treatment, Maternal, Newborn & Child Health, Primary Health Care, Women's Cancers
Democratic Republic of the Congo	Global Health Security, Immunization, Malaria Prevention & Treatment, Maternal, Newborn & Child Health
Eswatini	HIV & TB
Ethiopia	Health System Strengthening, Global Health Security, HIV & TB, Immunization, Maternal, Newborn & Child Health, Safe Surgery
Ghana	Global Health Security, HIV & TB, Immunization, Malaria Prevention & Treatment, Maternal, Newborn & Child Health
Guinea	HIV & TB, Immunization, Maternal, Newborn & Child Health
Kenya	Adolescent & Youth Health, HIV & TB, Immunization, Innovations, Malaria Prevention & Treatment, Maternal, Newborn & Child Health, Safe Surgery
Lesotho	HIV & TB, Immunization, Primary Health Care
Liberia	Adolescent & Youth Health, Global Health Security, HIV & TB, Immunization, Malaria Prevention & Treatment, Maternal, Newborn & Child Health
Madagascar	Maternal, Newborn & Child Health
Malawi	Adolescent & Youth Health, HIV & TB, Immunization, Maternal, Newborn & Child Health
Mali	Global Health Security, Malaria Prevention & Treatment, Maternal, Newborn & Child Health
Mozambique	HIV & TB, Immunization, Innovations, Women's Cancers
Namibia	Global Health Security, HIV & TB
Niger	Malaria Prevention & Treatment, Maternal, Newborn & Child Health
Nigeria	Global Health Security, HIV & TB, Immunization, Maternal, Newborn & Child Health
Rwanda	Adolescent & Youth Health, HIV & TB, Malaria Prevention & Treatment, Maternal, Newborn & Child Health
Sierra Leone	Global Health Security, HIV & TB, Innovations, Malaria Prevention & Treatment, Maternal, Newborn & Child Health, Women's Cancers
South Africa	HIV & TB
South Sudan	Adolescent & Youth Health, HIV & TB
Tanzania	Adolescent & Youth Health, HIV & TB, Immunization, Maternal, Newborn & Child Health
Togo	Global Health Security, Immunization
Uganda	HIV & TB
Zambia	HIV & TB, Immunization, Malaria Prevention & Treatment, Maternal, Newborn & Child Health, Women's Cancers
Zimbabwe	Adolescent & Youth Health, Global Health Security, HIV & TB, Malaria Prevention & Treatment

=== Asia and Near East ===
As of 2025, Jhpiego is actively working in 7 Asian countries:

Country	Primary Technical Area(s)
Afghanistan	Maternal, Newborn & Child Health
Bangladesh	Immunization, Maternal, Newborn & Child Health
Cambodia	Maternal, Newborn & Child Health
India	Adolescent & Youth Health, HIV & TB, Immunization, Innovations, Maternal, Newborn & Child Health, Primary Health Care, Women's Cancers
Indonesia	Immunization, Innovations, Maternal, Newborn & Child Health, Primary Health Care
Pakistan	Global Health Security, Immunization
Philippines	Adolescent & Youth Health, Maternal, Newborn & Child Health, Women's Cancers

=== The Americas ===
As of 2025, Jhpiego is actively working in 2 countries in the Americas:

Country	Primary Technical Area(s)
Ecuador	COVID-19 & Emerging Diseases, Global Health Security
Guatemala	Adolescent & Youth Health, Maternal, Newborn & Child Health, Women's Cancers
