= Stanislaus Tobias Magombo =

Stanislaus Tobias Magombo (24 February 1968 – 6 July 2010) was the Roman Catholic titular bishop of Caesarea in Mauretania and auxiliary bishop of the Roman Catholic Diocese of Lilongwe, Malawi.

Ordained to the priesthood on 3 August 1996 for the Roman Catholic Diocese of Dedza, Malawi, Magombo was named auxiliary bishop of the Lilongwe Diocese on 29 April 2009 and was ordained bishop on 11 July 2009.

== See also ==
He was the Form 1 Latin language teacher and the Rector of Saint Kizito Minor Seminary in Dedza Diocese until 2006. He was later appointed the auxiliary bishop for Lilongwe Archdiocese in 2006 and was a visiting parish priest for Kamuzu Barracks Saint Mary's parish in 2007.
