= Rémi Sainte-Marie =

Canadian archbishop (1938–2022)

His Excellency Rémi Sainte-Marie
- Archbishop Emritus of Lilongwe
- Diocese: Lilongwe
- Appointed: 9 February 2011
- Term ended: 3 July 2013
- Predecessor: Post created
- Successor: Tarcisius Gervazio Ziyaye
- Previous posts: Auxiliary Bishop of Dedza and Titular Bishop of Molicunza (1998–2000); Bishop of Dedza (2000–2006); Bishop of Lilongwe (2006–2011)

Orders
- Ordination: 29 June 1963
- Consecration: 9 May 1998 by Giuseppe Leanza

Personal details
- Born: Rémi Joseph Gustave Sainte-Marie; 11 January 1938 La Minerve, Québec, Canada
- Died: 18 June 2022 (aged 84) Montreal, Québec, Canada

Rémi Joseph Gustave Sainte-Marie (11 January 1938 – 18 June 2022) was a Canadian Roman Catholic prelate.

Sainte-Marie was born in Canada and was ordained to the priesthood in 1963. He served as auxiliary bishop and bishop of the Roman Catholic Diocese of Dedza, Malawi, from 1998 to 2006 and was the archbishop and bishop of the Roman Catholic Archdiocese of Lilongwe, Malawi, from 2006 until his retirement in 2013.

Catholic Church titles
Preceded by Post created	Archbishop of Lilongwe; 2011–2013	Succeeded by Tarcisius Gervazio Ziyaye
Preceded by Felix Eugenio Mkhori	Bishop of Lilongwe; 2006–2011	Succeeded by Post abolished
Preceded by Cyprian Monis	Titular Bishop of Molicunza; 1998–2000	Succeeded by Agnelo Rufino Gracias
Preceded by —	Auxiliary Bishop of Dedza; 1998–2000	Succeeded by —
