= Felix Eugenio Mkhori =

- Bishop of Lilongwe
- Church: Catholic Church
- Diocese: Diocese of Lilongwe
- In office: 23 January 2001 – 4 July 2007
- Predecessor: Tarcisius Gervazio Ziyaye
- Successor: Rémi Sainte-Marie
- Previous posts: Bishop of Chikwawa (1979-2001); Titular Bishop of Sicca Veneria (1977-1979); Auxiliary Bishop of Chikwawa (1977-1979)

Orders
- Ordination: 8 September 1961
- Consecration: 8 January 1978 by Eugen Joseph Frans Vroemen

Personal details
- Born: 24 August 1931
- Died: 27 October 2012 (aged 81)

Felix Eugenio Mkhori (24 August 1931 – 27 October 2012) was the bishop of the Roman Catholic Diocese of Lilongwe, Malawi.

Ordained to the priesthood in 1961, he was named a bishop in 1977. He was Bishop of Chikwawa from 1979 until 2001, when he was appointed Bishop of Lilongwe.

He retired in 2007 and died in 2012.
