= Rape in Malawi =

Rape and sexual violence in Malawi

Rape in Malawi is defined under the Penal Code as non-consensual carnal knowledge or sexual assault, punishable by up to 20 years’ imprisonment and, in certain circumstances, life imprisonment or death.

== Prevalence ==
=== Police data ===
In Q1 2020, 339 victims of sexual violence were reported to Malawi Police, constituting 17% of all cases; rape alone accounted for 1%. Between April and June 2020, 184 victims of sexual violence were reported (11% of total), with rape again making up about 1%.

=== Surveys and perception ===
A 2021 Demographic and Health Survey estimated that 11% of women aged 15–49 had experienced sexual violence in the past year. An Afrobarometer survey in April 2023 found that 44% of Malawians believe survivors of gender-based violence will be criticised or shamed by their community if they report.

== Causes and risk factors ==
Cultural norms and stigma contribute to under-reporting, with over 40% of survey respondents believing survivors are likely to face community shaming. Superstitious beliefs that defiling a minor brings luck or wealth have been linked to spikes in child rape.

== Notable cases ==
- In January 2022, High Court Judge Vikochi Chima sentenced police officer Andrew Chagaga to 30 years’ imprisonment for raping a 17-year-old student in custody.
- In May 2024, financial constraints delayed the Independent Complaints Commission's probe into alleged group rape by officers in Msundwe, Lilongwe.
- In April 2025, a Lilongwe court sentenced a 20-year-old man to 18 years’ imprisonment for raping a student nurse at night.

== Legal framework ==
Marital rape is not explicitly criminalised. The Child Protection Act 2010 sets the legal marriage age at 18 but lacks strong enforcement mechanisms.

== Responses ==
UNICEF and UN Women support social-norms campaigns and community dialogues to reduce stigma and encourage reporting. The World Bank recommends integrated GBV data systems and expanded Victim Support Units across police stations.

== See also ==
- Gender-based violence in Africa
- Malawi
