= Diocese of Zomba =

Roman Catholic diocese in Malawi

Coordinates: 15.4083°S 35.3077°E

Diocese of Zomba Dioecesis Zombaensis

Location
- Country: Malawi
- Metropolitan: Blantyre

Statistics
- Area: 3,232 km^{2} (1,248 sq mi)
- Population: Total; Catholics: (as of 2004); 685,541; 229,345 (33.5%)

Information
- Rite: Latin Rite

Current leadership
- Pope: Leo XIV
- Bishop: Alfred Mateyu Chaima
- Bishops emeritus: Allan Chamgwera

The Roman Catholic Diocese of Zomba (Latin: Zombaën(sis)) is a diocese located in the city of Zomba in the ecclesiastical province of Blantyre in Malawi.

== History ==
- May 15, 1952: Established as Apostolic Vicariate of Zomba from the Apostolic Vicariate of Shiré
- April 25, 1959: Promoted as Diocese of Zomba

== Leadership ==
- Vicar Apostolic of Zomba (Roman rite)
  - Bishop Lawrence Pullen Hardman, SMM (1952.05.15 – 1959.04.25 see below)
- Bishops of Zomba (Roman rite)
  - Bishop Lawrence Pullen Hardman, SMM (see above 1959.04.25 – 1970.09.21)
  - Bishop Matthias A. Chimole (1970.09.21 – 1979.12.20), appointed Bishop of Lilongwe
  - Bishop Allan Chamgwera (1981.02.12 – 2004.01.17)
  - Bishop Thomas Luke Msusa, SMM (2003.12.19 – 2013.11.21), appointed Archbishop of Blantyre
  - Bishop George Desmond Tambala, OCD (2015.10.15 – 2021.10.15), appointed Archbishop of Lilongwe
  - Bishop Alfred Mateyu Chaima (Since 5 June 2023)

== See also ==
- Roman Catholicism in Malawi
