= Emmanuele Kanyama =

Malawian Roman Catholic bishop (1962–2018)

Emmanuele Kanyama (25 December 1962 – 17 February 2018) was a Roman Catholic bishop.

Kanyama was ordained to the priesthood in 1990. He served as bishop of the Roman Catholic Diocese of Dedza, Malawi, from 2007 until his death.

== Death ==
Kanyama died at his home in Kapiri, Mchinji District, Malawi on 17 February 2018 from complications of diabetes, at the age of 55.
