= Diocese of Dedza =

Roman Catholic diocese in Malawi

Coordinates: 14.3555°S 34.4278°E

Diocese of Dedza Dioecesis Dedzaensis

Location
- Country: Malawi
- Metropolitan: Lilongwe

Statistics
- Area: 4,250 km^{2} (1,640 sq mi)
- Population: Total; Catholics: (as of 2004); 1,173,000; 459,398 (39.2%)

Information
- Rite: Latin Rite

Current leadership
- Pope: Leo XIV
- Bishop: Peter Adrian Chifukwa

The Roman Catholic Diocese of Dedza (Latin: Dedzaën(sis)) is a diocese seated in the city of Dedza, in the ecclesiastical province of Lilongwe in Malawi.

== History ==
- 1956-04-29: Established as Apostolic Vicariate of Dedza from the Apostolic Vicariate of Likuni and Apostolic Vicariate of Zomba
- 1959-04-25: Promoted as Diocese of Dedza

== Bishops ==
- Vicar Apostolic of Dedza (Roman rite)
  - Bishop Cornelius Chitsulo (1956-11-09 – 1959-04-25 see below)
- Bishops of Dedza (Roman rite)
  - Bishop Cornelius Chitsulo (see above 1959-04-25 – 1984-02-28)
  - Bishop Gervazio Moses Chisendera (1984-06-25 – 2000-09-07)
  - Bishop Rémi Joseph Gustave Sainte-Marie, M. Afr. (2000-09-07 – 2006-02-18), appointed Coadjutor Bishop of Lilongwe
  - Bishop Emmanuele Kanyama (2007-07-04 – 2018-02-17)
  - Bishop Peter Adrian Chifukwa (2021.05.08 – ...)

=== Auxiliary Bishops ===
- Rémi Joseph Gustave Sainte-Marie, M. Afr. (1998-2000), appointed Bishop here
- Tarcisius Gervazio Ziyaye (1991-1993), appointed Coadjutor Bishop of Lilongwe

=== Other priest of this diocese who became bishop ===
- Stanislaus Tobias Magombo, appointed auxiliary bishop of Lilongwe in 2009

== See also ==
- Roman Catholicism in Malawi
