= International Day of the Midwife =

International observance celebrating midwives

- Observed by: International Confederation of Midwives
- Date: 5 May
- Next time: 5 May 2027
- Frequency: Annual
- First time: 1992

The International Day of the Midwife is annually celebrated on 5 May, and was established in 1992 by the International Confederation of Midwives (ICM) to celebrate and raise awareness about the midwifery profession.

== Observance ==
The occasion is observed by over 50 nations around the world, as well as international organizations such as the WHO and UNFPA. A theme is chosen by the ICM every year. For instance, the 2023 theme was "Together again: from evidence to reality". Social media graphics packages are distributed by the ICM to encourage online advocacy.

The events of the celebration often include seminars and social gatherings for midwives, among other activities. For example, the 2011 celebration in Malta included a five-kilometer public demonstration from Pietà to St. Julian's to raise public awareness, followed by a seminar about lactation and skin care for new mothers, and a "wine-and-dine" social event. In the 2023 celebration in Maryland County, Liberia, the midwives met with local schoolchildren. The events are sometimes held remotely via video conference. On 5 May 2022, the Bristol and Belfast city halls lit up in berry and tangerine, the colors of the Royal College of Midwives, to mark the occasion.

== Graphics ==
=== 2023 ===
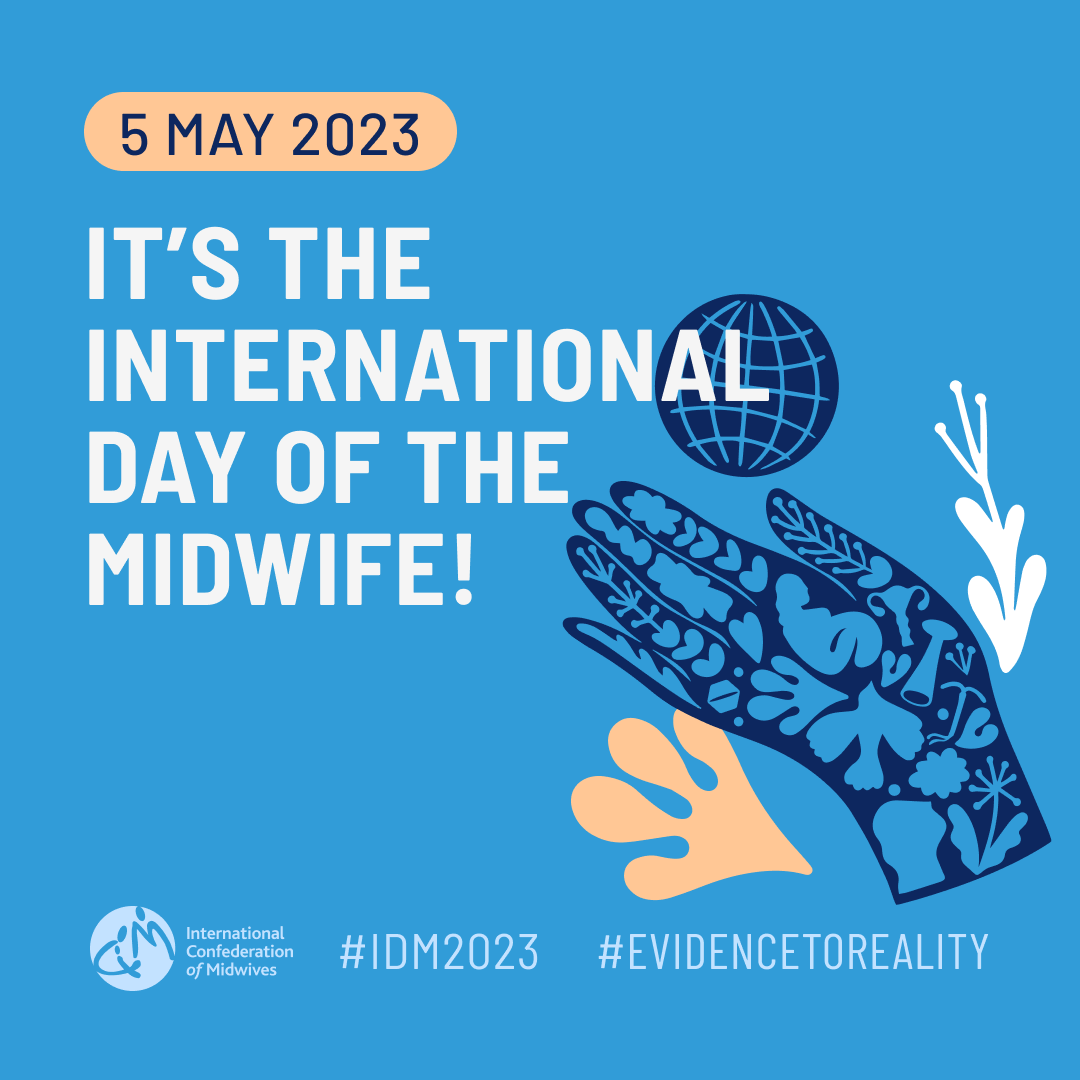

=== 2025 ===
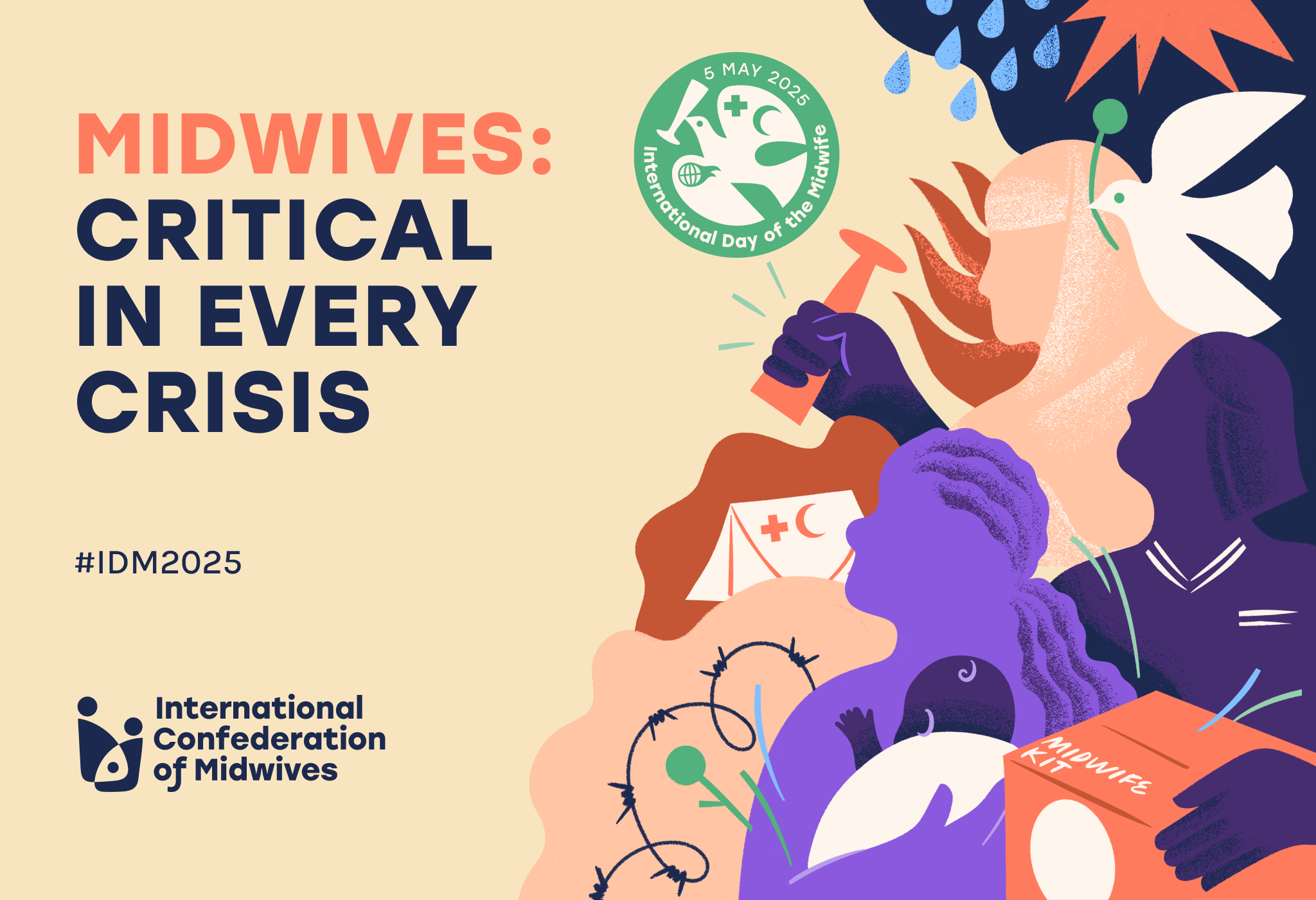
