= Diocese of Chikwawa =

Roman Catholic diocese in Malawi

Coordinates: 16.0403°S 34.7989°E

Diocese of Chikwawa Dioecesis Chiquavanus

Location
- Country: Malawi
- Metropolitan: Blantyre

Statistics
- Area: 7,676 km^{2} (2,964 sq mi)
- Population: Total; Catholics: (as of 2004); 1,225,000; 179,886 (14.7%)

Information
- Rite: Latin Rite

Current leadership
- Pope: Leo XIV
- Bishop: Peter Martin Musikuwa

The Roman Catholic Diocese of Chikwawa (Latin: Chiquavan(us)) is a diocese located in the city of Chikwawa in the ecclesiastical province of Blantyre in Malawi.

== History ==
- March 22, 1965: Established as Diocese of Chikwawa from the Metropolitan Archdiocese of Blantyre

== Bishops ==
- Bishops of Chikwawa (Roman rite)
  - Bishop Eugen Joseph Frans Vroemen, S.M.M. (1965.03.22 – 1979.02.12)
  - Bishop Felix Eugenio Mkhori (1979.02.12 – 2001.01.23), appointed Bishop of Lilongwe
  - Bishop Peter Martin Musikuwa (since 2003.04.16)

=== Auxiliary Bishop ===
- Felix Eugenio Mkhori (1977-1979), appointed Bishop here

== See also ==
- Roman Catholicism in Malawi

== Sources ==
- GCatholic.org
- Catholic Hierarchy
