= Apostolic Vicariate of Shire =

The Vicariate Apostolic of Shiré (Latin: Vicariatus Apostolicus ?) was an Apostolic vicariate located in Nyasaland Protectorate, Africa. It was formed from the Apostolic Vicariate of Nyassa in 1903. In 1952, the Apostolic Vicariate of Shiré was renamed as the Apostolic Vicariate of Blantyre. In 1959 it was promoted as the Archdiocese of Blantyre.

== Geographic location ==
Nyassaland Protectoriate lies between 9°41' and 17°15' S. lat., and 33° and 36° E. long. It is about 520 miles (840 km) long, its width varying from 50 to 100 miles (160 km). It covers an area of 43,608 square miles (112,940 km^{2}). The white population is at most 600, while there are millions of natives. Nyassaland is divided into thirteen districts. The mission of the White Fathers evangelizes the five northern districts which lie west of Lake Nyassa. The Vicariate Apostolic of Shire is composed of the eight other districts lying south of Lake Nyassa. The vicariate lies between 13°30' and 17°15' S. lat. It is bounded on the north by the District of Angoniland and Lake Nyassa, on the east, south, and west by Portuguese East Africa. The territory lies 130 miles (210 km) as the crow flies from the Indian Ocean. The name is derived from the Shire River which flows through the length of the vicariate.

== History ==
The Sacred Congregation for the Propagation of the Faith confided evangelization of this territory to the missionaries of the Company of Mary, founded by St. Louis-Marie Grignion de Montfort. On 28 June 1901, the first three missionaries arrived at Blantyre and on 25 July began their first mission in Angoniland. In 1904 the mission was made a prefecture Apostolic and one of the missionaries, Rev. Father Prezeau, former missionary of the Diocese of Kingston, Canada, was elected the first Apostolic prefect. Already four stations had been founded, and numerous schools established in all directions spread the Christian doctrine. On 14 April 1908, Pope Pius X erected the prefecture into a vicariate Apostolic with Mgr Auguste Prezeau as the first vicar. Prezeau was consecrated at Zanzibar on October 4, 1908, by Mgr Allgeyer of the Fathers of the Holy Ghost, and died in France on 4 December 1910. On 4 May 1910, one of the missionaries received from Rome the notification of his elevation to the dignity of Apostolic vicariate. Mgr Auneau was consecrated at Chilubula, Northern Rhodesia, by Mgr Dupont of the White Fathers, 1 Nov., 1910.

== Sources ==
- GCatholic.org
