= Malawi's 2013 Gender Equality Act =

Malawi's Gender Equality Act (GEA), enacted in 2013, is a piece of legislation aimed at addressing gender inequality and discrimination. The act was a step in the country's efforts to promote the rights of women and girls, and it established a legal framework to combat various forms of discrimination and harmful practices.

== Key provision ==
The GEA's key provisions include:

- Prohibition of sex discrimination: The act criminalizes discrimination based on sex in all aspects of life, including employment, education, and public services.
- Combating harmful practices: It outlaws harmful cultural practices such as child marriage and female genital mutilation.
- Sexual harassment: The GEA provides a legal definition of sexual harassment and establishes penalties for offenders.
- Gender quotas: The act includes provisions for gender quotas in public service employment, with the goal of achieving a more balanced representation of men and women.
- Enforcement: The Malawi Human Rights Commission is empowered to monitor and enforce the act, including investigating complaints and making recommendations.
- Reproductive health: The act affirms the right to sexual and reproductive health services, including family planning and maternal health care.
