= Marjorie Ngaunje =

Malawian politician

Marjory Ngaunje

Minister of Health of Malawi
- In office 2006 – February 2008
- President: Bingu wa Mutharika

Personal details
- Died: November 2013 Lilongwe, Malawi
- Party: Democratic Progressive Party (Malawi)

Marjory Ngaunje or Marjorie Nhaunje (died November 2013) was a Malawian politician and educator. She was the Minister of Health in Malawi, from 2006 to 2008 under the former president of Malawi, Bingu wa Mutharika.

== Life ==
Ngaunje came to notice when she stood as an independent candidate in the Ntcheu Bwanje South Constituency. She became a member of the National Assembly.

The President promoted her to deputy minister of home affairs and internal security in 2005. She then moved to the Ministry of Foreign Affairs as a junior minister. She became the Minister of Health in 2006. Ngaunje as a minister lived in a government house and she refused to leave and she allegedly had to be evicted. She served in the role until a cabinet reshuffle in February 2008.

During the 2009 election she stood, but she was beaten by Lucious Kanyumba who became the Minister of Health. After this her prospects were not good and she lived in area 10 of Lilongwe where her health and finances were poor.

Ngaunje died in November 2013 at her residence in Lilongwe. She had been the first woman MP in the District of Ntcheu. The next woman to win a seat was Nancy Chaola Mdooko who won in 2019.

Awards and achievements
Preceded by	Minister of Health of Malawi	Succeeded by
