= Archdiocese of Lilongwe =

Roman Catholic archdiocese in Malawi

Coordinates: 13.9791°S 33.7625°E

Archdiocese of Lilongwe Archidioecesis Lilongvensis

Location
- Country: Malawi

Statistics
- Area: 24,025 km^{2} (9,276 sq mi)
- Population: Total; Catholics: (as of 2004); 6,899,038; 1,764,000 (25.6%)
- Parishes: 46

Information
- Rite: Latin Rite
- Established: April 25, 1959
- Cathedral: Our Lady of Africa Cathedral
- Patron saint: Our Lady of Africa
- Secular priests: 108

Current leadership
- Pope: Leo XIV
- Archbishop: George Desmond Tambala
- Suffragans: Dedza; Mzuzu; Karonga

The Roman Catholic Archdiocese of Lilongwe (Latin: Archidioecesis Lilongvensis) is the Roman Catholic archdiocese located in Lilongwe in Malawi. Before its elevation to an archdiocese in 2011, it had belonged to the ecclesiastical province of the Archdiocese of Blantyre. The Maula Cathedral is located in the town of Lilongwe.

== Timeline ==
- July 31, 1889: Established as Apostolic Prefecture of Nyassa from the Apostolic Vicariate of Tanganyika in Tanzania
- February 12, 1897: Promoted as Apostolic Vicariate of Nyassa
- July 12, 1951: Renamed as Apostolic Vicariate of Likuni
- June 20, 1958: Renamed as Apostolic Vicariate of Lilongwe
- April 25, 1959: Promoted as Diocese of Lilongwe
- February 9, 2011: Elevated to Archdiocese of Lilongwe

== Bishops ==
- Vicars Apostolic of Nyassa (Roman rite)
  - Bishop Joseph-Marie-Stanislas Dupont, MAfr (1897.02.12 – 1911.02.28)
  - Bishop Mathurin Guillemé, MAfr (1911.02.24 – 1934.06.27)
  - Bishop Joseph Ansgarius Julien, MAfr (1934.12.10 – 1950.12.07)
- Vicar Apostolic of Likuni (Roman rite)
  - Bishop Joseph Fady, MAfr (1951.07.10 – 1958.06.20 see below)
- Vicar Apostolic of Lilongwe (Roman rite)
  - Bishop Joseph Fady, MAfr (see above 1958.06.20 – 1959.04.25 see below)
- Bishops of Lilongwe (Roman rite)
  - Bishop Joseph Fady, MAfr (see above 1959.04.25 – 1972.05.06)
  - Bishop Patrick Augustine Kalilombe, MAfr (1972.05.06 – 1979.12.20)
  - Bishop Matthias A. Chimole (1979.12.20 – 1994.11.11)
  - Bishop Tarcisius Gervazio Ziyaye (1994.11.11 – 2001.01.23), appointed Archbishop of Blantyre; later returned here as Archbishop
  - Bishop Felix Eugenio Mkhori (2001.01.23 – 2007.07.04)
  - Bishop Rémi Joseph Gustave Sainte-Marie, MAfr (2007.07.04 - 2011.02.09 see below)
- Archbishops of Lilongwe (Roman rite)
  - Archbishop Rémi Joseph Gustave Sainte-Marie, MAfr (see above 2011.02.09 - 2013.07.03)
  - Archbishop Tarcisius Gervazio Ziyaye (2013.07.03 – 2020.12.14); was previously here as Bishop
  - Archbishop George Desmond Tambala, OCD (since 2021.10.15)

=== Coadjutor Bishops ===
- Rémi Joseph Gustave Sainte-Marie, MAfr (2006-2007)
- Tarcisius Gervazio Ziyaye (1993-1994)

=== Auxiliary Bishop ===
- Stanislaus Tobias Magombo (2009-2010)
- Vincent Frederick Mwakhwawa (Since January 2024)

== Suffragan dioceses ==
Its suffragan dioceses are:

- Dedza
- Karonga
- Mzuzu

== Sources ==
- GCatholic.org
