= George Desmond Tambala =

Malawian Roman Catholic prelate

- Archbishop
- Church: Catholic Church
- Archdiocese: Roman Catholic Archdiocese of Lilongwe
- See: Roman Catholic Archdiocese of Lilongwe
- Appointed: 15 October 2021
- Term ended: Incumbent
- Predecessor: Tarcisius Gervazio Ziyaye
- Successor: Incumbent
- Other post: Bishop of Diocese of Zomba (2015 - 2021); Apostolic Administrator of Zomba (2021 - 2023)

Orders
- Ordination: 13 April 1996
- Consecration: 30 January 2016 by Julio Murat
- Rank: Archbishop

Personal details
- Born: George Desmond Tambala; 11 November 1968 (age 58) Zomba, Diocese of Zomba, Malawi
- Coat of arms

Styles of George Desmond Tambala, OCD
- Reference style: His Grace; The Most Reverend
- Spoken style: Your Grace
- Religious style: Bishop

George Desmond Tambala (born 11 November 1968) is a Malawian Catholic prelate who is the Archbishop of the Archdiocese of Lilongwe in Malawi. He was appointed Archbishop of Lilongwe on 15 October 2021 by Pope Francis.

== Background and education ==
He was born on 11 November 1968 in the city of Zomba, the capital city of Malawi, at that time. He attended primary school in his home area. He went to the Child Jesus Nankhunda Minor Seminary in Zomba for his secondary school studies between 1983 until 1987. He professed as a member of the Order of Discalced Carmelites (OCD) in 1991. Later, he attended the Inter-Congregational Seminary for Philosophy in Balaka, Malawi. He pursued his Theological Studies at Tangaza University College (today Tangaza University), in Kenya. In 2000 he graduated with a Licentiate in Theology from the Theological Faculty of Northern Spain.

== Priesthood ==
On 15 August 1995 he took his solemn vows as a member of OCD. He was ordained a priest on 13 April 1996 in Chiphaso Parish in Lilongwe.

== As bishop ==
On 15 October 2015 Pope Francis appointed Father George Desmond Tambala, OCD, as Bishop of the Diocese of Zomba. He was consecrated bishop and installed on 30 January 2016 at the grounds of Zomba Catholic Secondary School, Diocese of Zomba, Malawi. The Principal Consecrator was Archbishop Julio Murat, Titular Archbishop of Orange and Papal Nuncio, assisted by Archbishop Thomas Luke Msusa, SMM, Archbishop of Blantyre and Archbishop Tarcisius Gervazio Ziyaye, Archbishop of Lilongwe.

Pope Francis appointed him as the Metropolitan Archbishop of Lilongwe, Malawi on 15 October 2021. He succeeded the late Archbishop Tarcisius Gervazio Ziyaye, who died on 14 December 2020. He was installed there on 27 November 2021. He remained the Apostolic Administrator of the Diocese of Zomba until another Apostolic Administrator became available on 12 August 2023.

As of June 2022, Archbishop George Desmond Tambala was the Chancellor of the Catholic University of Malawi.

== See also ==
- Catholic Church in Malawi

== Succession table ==
Catholic Church titles
Preceded by Tarcisius Gervazio Ziyaye (2013 - 2020)	Archbishop of Archdiocese of Lilongwe; 2021 - present	Succeeded by Incumbent
Preceded by Thomas Luke Msusa (2003 - 2013)	Bishop of Diocese of Zomba; 2015 - 2021	Succeeded by Alfred Mateyu Chaima (Since 5 June 2023)
