= Roman Catholic Archdiocese of Blantyre =

Roman Catholic archdiocese in Malawi

Coordinates: 15.8038°S 35.0690°E

Archdiocese of Blantyre Archidioecesis Blantyrensis
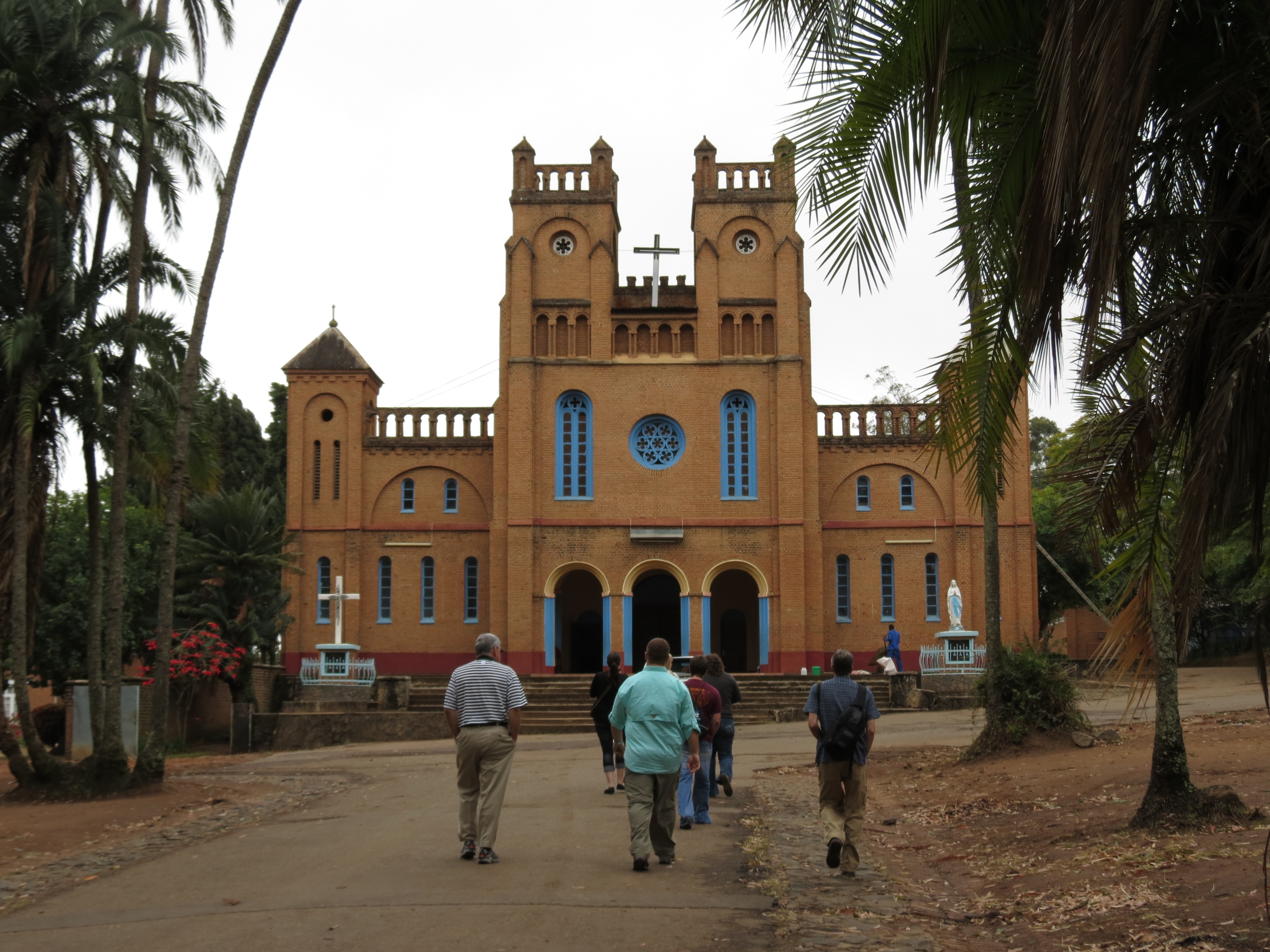

Location
- Country: Malawi

Statistics
- Area: 9,166 km^{2} (3,539 sq mi)
- Population: Total; Catholics: (as of 2022); 5,016,000; 3,196,000 (63.7%)
- Parishes: 43

Information
- Rite: Latin Rite
- Established: April 25, 1959
- Cathedral: Our Lady of Wisdom Cathedral
- Patron saint: Our Lady Queen of All Hearts
- Secular priests: 201

Current leadership
- Pope: Leo XIV
- Archbishop: Thomas Luke Msusa
- Suffragans: Zomba; Chikwawa; Mangochi

The Roman Catholic Archdiocese of Blantyre (Latin: Archidioecesis Blantyren(sis)) is the Roman Catholic archdiocese for Blantyre in Malawi. The cathedral church of the archdiocese is the Our Lady of Wisdom Cathedral, Blantyre.

The Archdiocese of Blantyre is 9,166 square miles (23,740 km^{2}). Out of a total population of 4,600,000, there are 1,133,850 Catholics. There are 78 priests and 287 religious. Currently, Thomas Luke Msusa SMM is the bishop of the diocese.

== History ==
- 1903.12.03: Established as Apostolic Prefecture of Shiré from Apostolic Vicariate of Nyassa
- 1908.04.14: Promoted as Apostolic Vicariate of Shiré
- 1952.05.15: Renamed as Apostolic Vicariate of Blantyre
- 1959.04.25: Promoted as Metropolitan Archdiocese of Blantyre

== Bishops ==
=== Ordinaries ===
- Prefect Apostolic of Shiré
  - Father Auguste Prézeau, S.M.M.:1903.12.03 - 1908.04.18 see below
- Vicars apostolic of Shiré
  - Auguste Prézeau, S.M.M.:see above 1908.04.18 - 1909.12.02
  - Louis-Joseph-Marie Auneau, S.M.M.:1910.05.09 - 1949.12.25
  - John Baptist Hubert Theunissen, S.M.M.:1949.12.25 – 1952.05.15 see below
- Vicar apostolic of Blantyre (Roman rite)
  - John Baptist Hubert Theunissen, S.M.M.:see above 1952.05.15 – 1959.04.25 see below
- Metropolitan archbishops of Blantyre (Roman rite)
  - John Baptist Hubert Theunissen, S.M.M.:see above 1959.04.25 – 1967.10.14
  - James Chiona:1967.11.29 – 2001.01.23
  - Tarcisius Gervazio Ziyaye:2001.01.23 - 2013.07.03; transferred to be Archbishop of Lilongwe due to a resignation
  - Thomas Luke Msusa:2013.11.21 -

=== Auxiliary Bishops ===
- James Chiona (1965-1967), appointed Archbishop here
- Montfort Stima (Sitima) (2010-2013), appointed Bishop of Mangochi

=== Other priest of this diocese who became bishop ===
- Peter Martin Musikuwa, appointed Bishop of Chikwawa in 2003

== Suffragan dioceses ==
- Diocese of Chikwawa
- Diocese of Mangochi
- Diocese of Zomba

== See also ==
- List of Roman Catholic dioceses in Malawi

== Sources ==
- GCatholic.org
