= Mua, Malawi =

Coordinates: 14.2836°S 34.5108°E

Mua
- Village
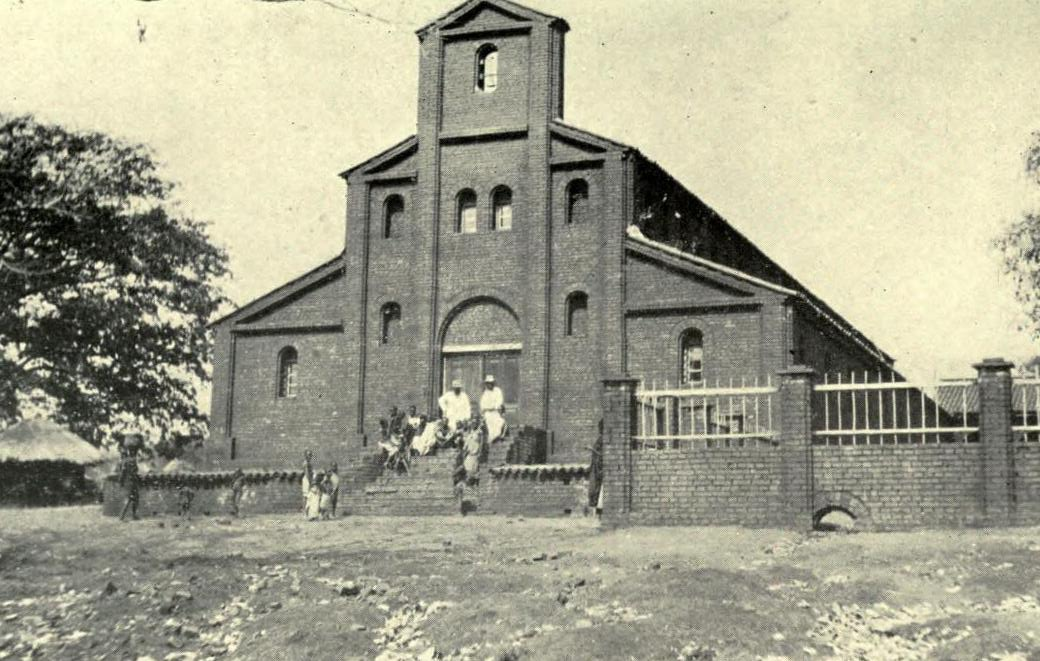
- White Fathers church at Mua

- Location in Malawi
- Country: Malawi
- District: Dedza District
- Time zone: UTC+2 (CAT)

Mua is a village in the Dedza District of Malawi, close to the Dedza Plateau. The village is the seat of the most ancient Roman Catholic mission of Malawi, the Mua Mission, as well as a cultural centre and museum created by the missionaries, the KuNgoni Centre of Culture and Art.

== See also ==
- Kungoni
