= Tarcisius Gervazio Ziyaye =

Malawian Catholic archbishop (1949–2020)

- Archbishop of Lilongwe
- Church: Catholic Church
- Archdiocese: Archdiocese of Lilongwe
- In office: 3 July 2013 – 14 December 2020
- Predecessor: Rémi Sainte-Marie
- Successor: George Desmond Tambala
- Previous posts: Archbishop of Blantyre (2001-2013); Bishop of Lilongwe (1994-2001); Coadjutor Bishop of Lilongwe (1993-1994); Titular Bishop of Macon (1991-1993); Auxiliary Bishop of Dedza (1991-1993)

Orders
- Ordination: 14 August 1977
- Consecration: 23 May 1992 by James Chiona

Personal details
- Born: 19 May 1949 Khombe (south of Lilongwe), Nyasaland, British Empire
- Died: 14 December 2020 (aged 71) Windhoek, Namibia

Tarcisius Gervazio Ziyaye (19 May 1949 – 14 December 2020) was a Malawian Roman Catholic archbishop.

Ziyaye was born in Malawi and was ordained to the priesthood in 1977. He served as titular bishop of Macon and auxiliary bishop of the Roman Catholic Diocese of Dedza, Malawi, from 1991 to 1993.

He was appointed Coadjutor Bishop of Lilongwe in 1993 and became Bishop of Lilongwe in 1994. In 2001 Ziyaye was appointed Archbishop of Blantyre.

He was Archbishop of Lilongwe from 2013 until his death in 2020.
