= Dedza =

- Dedza Town Hall in 2026 (courtesy of the Gender and Justice Unit)

- Location in Malawi
- Coordinates: 14°20′S 34°20′E
- Country: Malawi
- Region: Central Region
- District: Dedza District
- Elevation: 1,590 m (5,220 ft)

Population (2018 Census)
  - Total: 30,928
- Time zone: +2
- Climate: Cwb

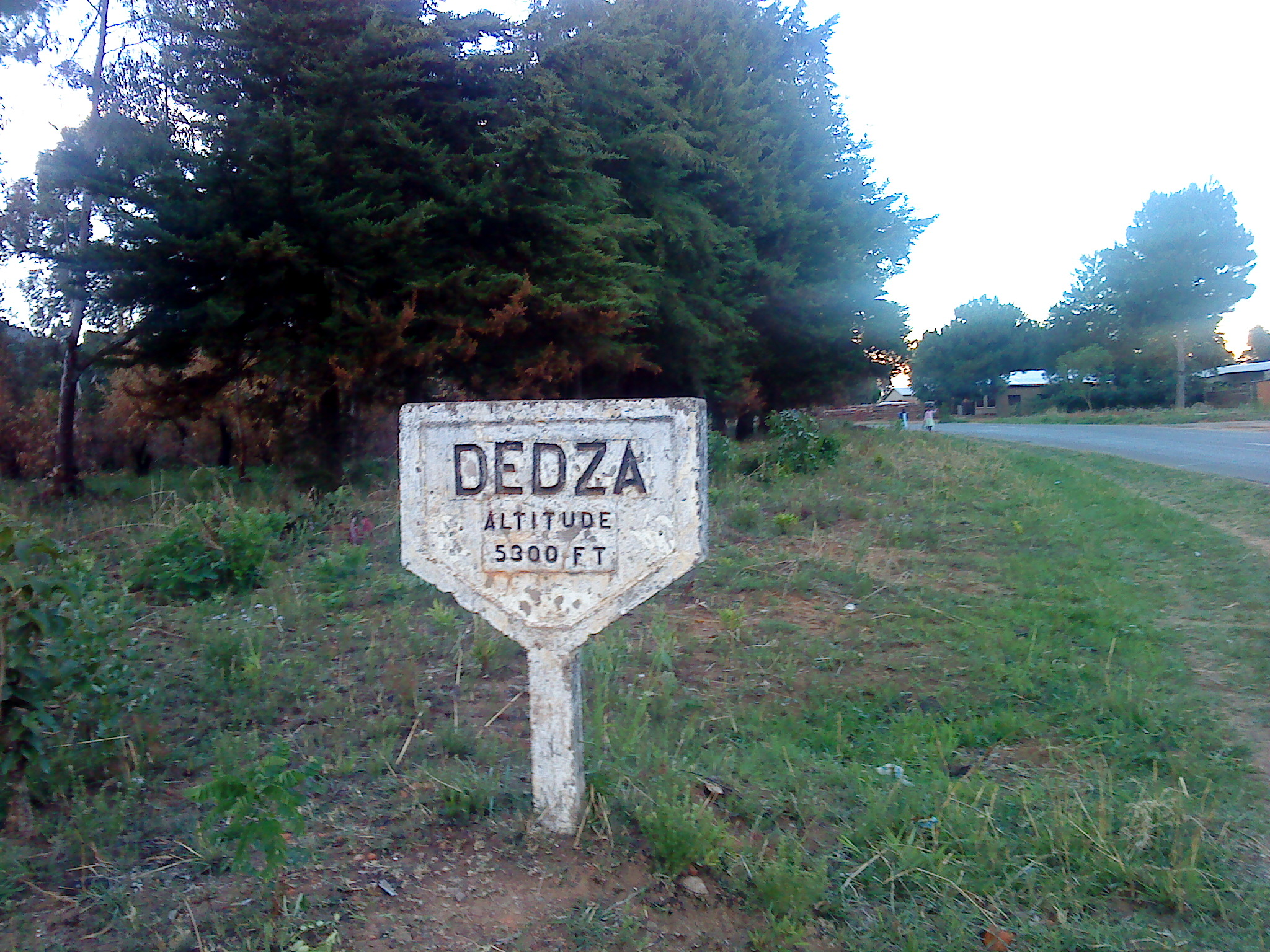
Altitude marker of Dedza in Malawi

Dedza is the main township of Dedza District in the Central Region of Malawi. In 2026 it returned to having a town council.

== Description ==
Dedza is located about 85 km south of Malawi's capital, Lilongwe, off the M1 road to Blantyre at a point where a trans-African highway from Johannesburg enters the country.

At an altitude of 1590m it is the highest town in Malawi. In June and July it can be chilly, especially in the mornings and evenings.

The town is based around a bypass loop of tarmac road connected to the M1. At the northern end of the town centre there is a bus station, Town Assembly offices, sports stadium, police station, banks and petrol station. At the southern end there is a hospital and large market. There are many shops and businesses along the road and a parallel dirt road. Two other petrol stations are located on the M1.

Accommodation is available at the Dedza Pottery, Panjira Lodge, Rainbow Resthouse and other local resthouses. There are a number of bars and cafes in the town centre, such as the Boiz Club and Golden Dish and a cyber-café – AY Business Cafe. The Dedza Pottery Coffee Shop is 1 km along a dirt road near the M1 northern junction.

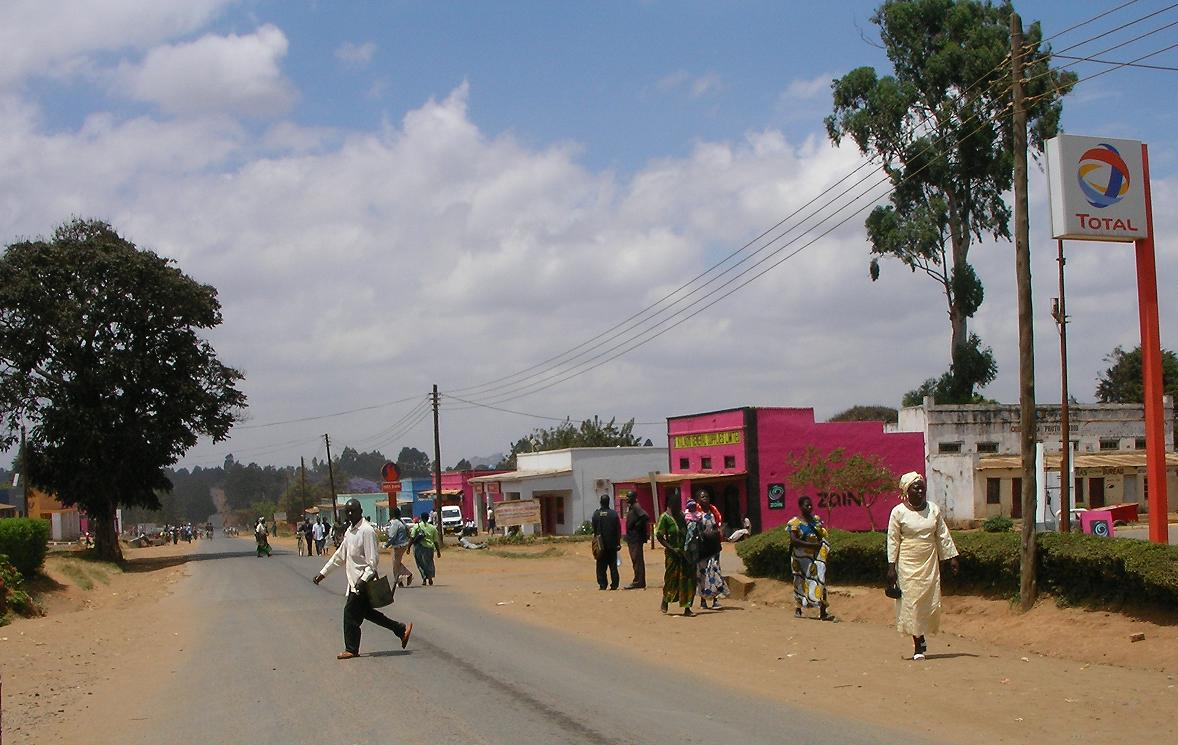
Dedza

The Dedza Pottery sells a wide range of ceramics and there are a number of craft shops along the dirt road to it. A walk up to the top of Dedza Mountain (2198m) is possible on a maintenance road for the communication aerials.

The main industries of the town are Paragon Ceramics, which makes floor and roof tiles, etc., located at the Dedza Pottery and the WICO Sawmill on the opposite side of the road.

The offices of the various departments of the Dedza District Assembly are located in the township. So also are offices for several NGOs operating in the district, such as Save the Children, Concern Universal and the Red Cross. The town has several primary schools, Mchisu day secondary school and Umbwi and Dedza Secondary boarding schools.

Dedza was linked with Norwich, England by the Norwich-Dedza Partnership, a UK-based charity. The partnership supported education, health, agriculture, tourism development and public sector organisations in Dedza District through volunteer workers, supply of computers and other materials and small scale funding. The eye clinic at Dedza District Hospital is supported by Norwich charity Far Sight which provided training and equipment.

In 2026, Richard Chimwendo Banda who was the Leader of the House in Parliament and the Minister of Local Government, Unity and Culture announced that Dedza (and Salima and Karonga) would return to having a town council.

== Climate ==
Dedza has a subtropical highland climate (Köppen: Cwb) with cool to warm temperatures year round. The rainy season runs from November to April, and the dry season runs from May to October.

Climate data for Dedza, Malawi (1961-1990)
Month	Jan	Feb	Mar	Apr	May	Jun	Jul	Aug	Sep	Oct	Nov	Dec	Year
Mean daily maximum °C (°F)	23.0 (73.4)	23.0 (73.4)	23.0 (73.4)	22.5 (72.5)	21.2 (70.2)	19.4 (66.9)	19.0 (66.2)	20.5 (68.9)	23.3 (73.9)	24.9 (76.8)	24.9 (76.8)	23.5 (74.3)	22.3 (72.1)
Daily mean °C (°F)	18.7 (65.7)	19.0 (66.2)	18.5 (65.3)	17.6 (63.7)	15.9 (60.6)	14.0 (57.2)	13.6 (56.5)	15.2 (59.4)	17.8 (64.0)	19.7 (67.5)	20.0 (68.0)	19.1 (66.4)	17.4 (63.3)
Mean daily minimum °C (°F)	15.5 (59.9)	15.4 (59.7)	15.0 (59.0)	13.9 (57.0)	11.7 (53.1)	9.5 (49.1)	9.1 (48.4)	10.6 (51.1)	13.2 (55.8)	15.0 (59.0)	15.9 (60.6)	15.7 (60.3)	13.4 (56.1)
Average precipitation mm (inches)	288.6 (11.36)	233.9 (9.21)	179.6 (7.07)	67.0 (2.64)	10.6 (0.42)	4.1 (0.16)	3.7 (0.15)	1.3 (0.05)	4.0 (0.16)	11.9 (0.47)	74.1 (2.92)	231.0 (9.09)	1,109.8 (43.69)
Average precipitation days (≥ 0.3 mm)	20	17	13	6	2	2	3	2	1	2	6	15	89
Average relative humidity (%)	84	86	83	81	72	67	66	60	55	57	65	80	71
Mean monthly sunshine hours	151.9	142.8	182.9	213.0	248.0	246.0	241.8	269.7	288.0	288.3	225.0	164.3	2,661.7
Percentage possible sunshine	38	41	49	61	71	73	69	75	80	75	59	41	61
Source: NOAA

== Demographics ==
Year	Population
1977	5,448
1987	16,899
1998	15,408
2008	20,241
2018	30,928

== See also ==
- Dedza District
- Chongoni Rock Art Area
- Roman Catholic Diocese of Dedza
