= Catholic Church in Malawi =

The Catholic Church in Malawi is part of the worldwide Catholic Church, under the spiritual leadership of the Pope in Rome and the Malawi Bishops. Catholic missionary in Malawi began in 1889 with the arrival of the White Fathers. Their early missions grew through interacting with local African communities and leaders including Chief Mponda.

In present day Malawi, religious life has changed with people interacting with other Christian traditions. Research that was held in rural Malawi took note of the influence of Pentecostal and "born again" religious identities within some of the Catholic communities.

== History ==
=== The early Catholic missions ===
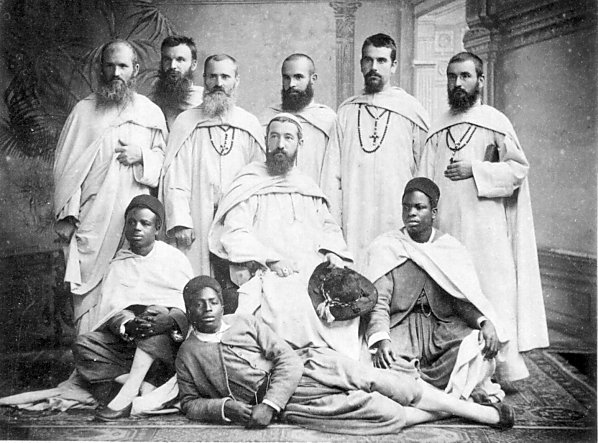
A photograph of what the White Fathers dressed and looked like.

The first Catholic missionaries were White Fathers (Père's Blancs in French), a group founded in Algeria in 1868. Between 1868 and 1878, the White Fathers had at least 175 members, or as one might know, priests. The White Fathers arrived in Malawi in 1889 and their arrival happened during a time of growing European colonial interest in the region, specifically a competition that was between Britain and Portugal, for control around Lake Nyasa.

The Portuguese authorities saw Catholic missionary activity as an opportunity for them to strengthen their political influence in the region. When the missionaries arrived, it was partly because of the wider colonial circumstances that happened in the nineteenth century Central Africa. That doesn't mean every missionary was there because of politics though, others had different motivations.

By December 1889, some members of the White Fathers missionaries went to the village of Mponda, who is the Yao Chief of the Lake Nyasa region, to spread their catholic work. When the missionaries arrived they found a community that had religious traditions and its own political leadership.

==== Relationships with the local communities ====
The Chief, Mponda, made it clear that he had authority over his community and also played a role in figuring out the missionaries circumstances when they were staying. The missionaries cooperated and their time with Mponda showed how early Catholic missionary developed, and it continued to grow with other political and religious institutions. By June 1891, they missionaries left because their mission lacked any results.

An image of a catholic church in Malawi, called St Luis Montfort Parish.

=== The development of the Catholic Church ===
By 1904, the White Fathers had three permanent mission stations at Kachebere, Likuni, and Mua. The Montfort's also had two missions at Nguludi and Nzama. Most of the White Fathers were French and, among the early leaders, were Bishops Louis Auneau, Joseph Dupont, and Mathurin Guillemé. It was not until 1937 that the first Malawi priests were ordained: Cornelio Chitsulo, Alfred Finye.

== 21st century ==
=== Catholic population and organization ===
As of 2025, Malawi is a Christian country, with 77.3% of the population having a Christian background; around than 17.2% of the population is Catholic.

The Catholic Church in Malawi is organized into two archdioceses, Christian districts, and six dioceses.

Archdiocese of Blantyre consists of three dioceses: Diocese of Chikwawa, Diocese of Mangochim, and Diocese of Zomba. The Archdiocese of Lilongwe consists of another three dioceses: Diocese of Dedza, Diocese of Karonga, and Diocese of Mzuzu.

=== Catholic Religious Life ===
In a 2010 study, sociologist Nicolette D. Manglos investigated religious experiences with Catholic and Pentecostal adults in rural Malawi. The study had interviews with young adults, aged from 18 to 25. They came from four congregations in the Balaka District: Catholic parishes, Liwonde and Ulongwe, and two Pentecostal congregations.

Manglos ended up finding out that some of the Catholic participating identified themselves as "born again," a religious identity that is mainly associated with Pentecostal Christianity. The study gave the impression that this identity wasn't just limited to just its own Pentecostal churches.

The people who participated described being "born again" as a change in ones personal behavior and morals. It's not just changing your religious beliefs. Manglos also found that there are differences between Catholic and Pentecostal participants in what it takes to achieve this transformation. Some Catholics held the concern of their ability to actually meet the moral standards that are connected with being born again.

This study helped give a deeper look into Catholic religious identity in young adults in the communities that were studied. However, the interview was limited to a specific rural congregation, so it should not be seen or represent the entire Catholic population of Malawi.

In 2020 there were 645 priests and over 1,000 nuns serving 207 parishes.

On June 5, 2023, Archbishop Gian Luca Perici was named as the Apostolic Nuncio to Malawi by Pope Francis.

== See also ==
- Christianity in Malawi
- List of Catholic dioceses in Malawi
- List of Christian denominations in Malawi
