= Thomas Luke Msusa =

Archbishop

The Most Reverend Thomas Luke Msusa S.M.M.
- Archbishop of Blantyre
- in 2023
- Church: Roman Catholic Church
- Archdiocese: Blantyre
- See: Blantyre
- Appointed: 21 November 2013
- Installed: 8 February 2014
- Predecessor: Tarcisius Gervazio Ziyaye
- Other post: President of the Malawian Episcopal Conference (2015-)
- Previous post: Bishop of Zomba (2004-13)

Orders
- Ordination: 3 August 1996
- Consecration: 17 April 2004 by Orlando Antonini

Personal details
- Born: Thomas Luke Msusa; 2 February 1962 (age 64) Iba, Malawi

Thomas Luke Msusa, S.M.M. (born 2 February 1962) is archbishop of the Roman Catholic Archdiocese of Blantyre in Malawi. He is a convert to the Catholic Church from Islam.

== Life ==
He is the son of a Muslim imam and at the age of seven left his village to study. He converted to the Catholic Church and was baptized at the age of twelve and after this entered the seminary, facing opposition of his family due to his conversion. Upon his return, he was rejected by his family except his uncle, himself a convert to the Catholic Church.

On 3 August 1996, Msusa was ordained to priesthood in the Company of Mary. His appointment as Catholic bishop was on 19 December 2003 by Pope John Paul II and on 17 April 2004 was ordained bishop to the Roman Catholic Diocese of Zomba by Orlando Antonini, with the principal co-consecrators being Tarcisius Gervazio Ziyaye, Archbishop of Blantyre, and Allan Chamgwera, bishop emeritus of Zomba.

After his ordination to the episcopate, Msusu's father asked to join the Catholic Church and Monsignor Msusa baptised him in 2006 after his father attended catechetical instruction.

On 21 November 2013 he was appointed to the Roman Catholic Archdiocese of Blantyre and on 8 February 2014 was installed on the archbishopric. In 2015, he was appointed vice president of the association of eight members of the Episcopal Conferences of Eastern Africa and participated in the Fourteenth Ordinary General Assembly of the Synod of Bishops.

In 2023 he was one of the leaders in a multi-faith demonstration against same-sex marriage in Malawi.
