= Mining industry of Malawi =

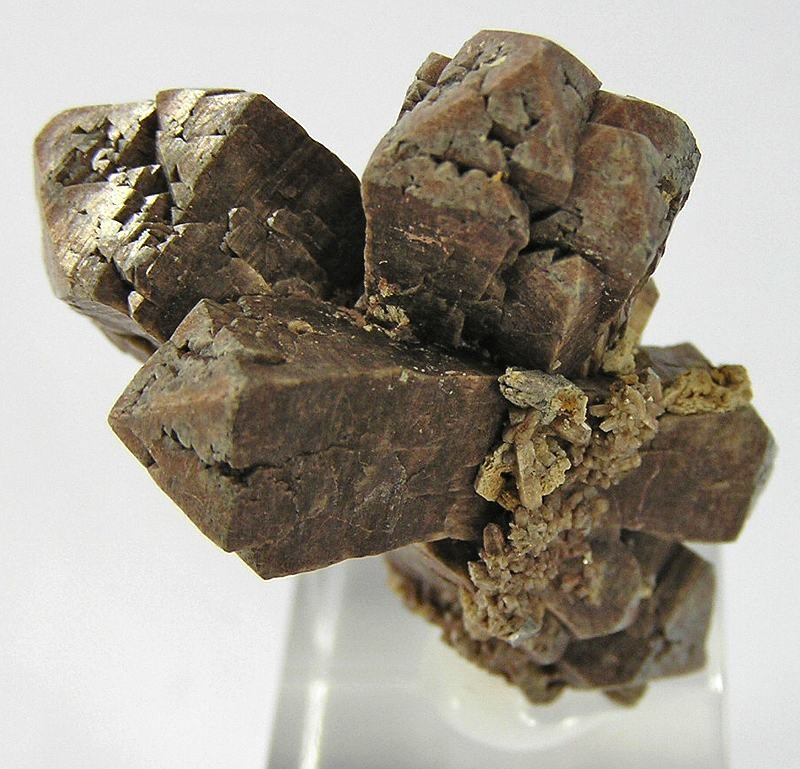
Zircon from Mount Malosa

The mining industry of Malawi, includes a number of gemstones and other minerals.

The value of mining is dominated by the extraction of fuel minerals, particularly uranium. Malawi's production of uranium has contributed 1% to the global production of this mineral. Since 2009, with new licenses granted to extract it from the Kayelekera uranium mine in Karonga District, in the northern region of the country, its production has contributed to an increase of Malawi's Gross Domestic Product (GDP) from 1% to 10% as of 2013. It is estimated that with increased emphasis on mineral extraction, the sector's contribution to GDP could be 20% by 2023. As of the financial year 2015–2016, the Government of Malawi reported that mining contributed less than 1%. This is attributed to suspension of production at Kayelekera Uranium Mine.

== History ==
Due to limited prospects of minerals and/or the remoteness of the mining areas, mining activity is limited to extraction of coal from Livingstonia and Rumphi mines in the northern region of the country. Other limited mining activities cited in 2015 included limestone for manufacture of cement, and limited extraction of gemstones such as agate, aquamarine, amethyst, garnet, corundum, rubies, and sapphires.

== Production ==
Mineral extraction in the country relies mostly on the private sector. Artisanal mining, to a limited extent, is of aggregates, brick clay, gemstones, and lime. Significant increases in mining for uranium, sulfuric acid, ornamental stone, coal and lime was recorded in 2010. The sector has provided increased employment opportunities in recent years.

== Legal framework ==
Malawi has enacted laws to govern the mining sector. These include: the Mines and Minerals Act 1981 which enunciates rules of business for the sector; the Petroleum (Exploration and Production) Act 1983; and the Explosives Act 1968. And the mines and minerals act 2018 Implementation of the Mining Act rests with the Commissioner for Mines and Minerals under the Ministry of Energy and Mining. A National Environmental Action Plan has also been proposed and it is mandatory for all mining projects to prepare an environmental impact assessment plan.

== Commodities ==
Minerals which have been explored and assessed include apatite near Lake Chilwa, bauxite from the hills of Mulanje, kyanite mines in the Dedza-Kirk Range; vermiculite in the region of Ntcheu close to Lake Malawi; and rare-earth minerals in Mount Kangankunde. The Chimimbe Hill mines in western Malawi have the potential for copper and nickel mining. Large deposits of niobium (columbium), tantalum, and zirconium (about 60 million metric tons in varying proportions and grades) have been recorded in the Kanyika pyrochlore mines. Clinker and gypsum have been imported to produce cement. The Kangankunde mine in the southwest of Balaka has a reserve of 2.53 million tons of 4.24% grade of rare earth elements.

== See also ==
- Kayelekera mine
- Kanyika mine
