= Catrum =

Catholic titular see

Catrum was an ancient city and diocese in Africa Proconsulare. It is now a Roman Catholic titular see.

== History ==
Catrum was among the numerous cities in the Roman province of Mauritania Caesariensis which were important enough to become suffragan dioceses, but faded (plausibly at the 7th century advent of Islam) - in its case so completely that even its location in present Algeria is unclear.

No bishop was historically documented.

== Titular see ==
The diocese was nominally restored in 1989 as Latin Titular bishopric of Catrum (Latin) / Catro (Curiate Italian) / Catrensis (Latin adjective).

It has had the following incumbents, so far of the fitting Episcopal (lowest) rank :

- František Rábek (1991.07.13 – 2003.01.20) as Auxiliary Bishop of Diocese of Nitra (Slovakia) (1991.07.13 – 2003.01.20); later Military Ordinary of Slovakia (Slovakia) (2003.01.20 – ...)
- Werner Guballa (2003.02.20 – death 2012.02.27) as Auxiliary Bishop of Diocese of Mainz (Germany) (2003.02.20 – 2012.02.27)
- Nelson Jesus Perez (2012.06.08 – 2017.09.05), Auxiliary Bishop of Diocese of Rockville Centre (USA) (2012.06.08 – 2017.09.05).
- Yohane Suzgo Nyirenda (born 20 June 1976), (5 May 2023 - 1 April 2025), Auxiliary Bishop of the Roman Catholic Diocese of Mzuzu, Malawi. Appointed Bishop of Mzuzu on 1 April 2025.

== See also ==
- List of Catholic dioceses in Algeria
