= Kanyika mine =

Niobium mine in Mzimba District, Northern Region, Malawi

- Location within Malawi
- Location: Mzimba District, Northern Region, Malawi; 12.697868°S 33.669577°E
- Products: Niobium; Tantalum; Uranium; Zircon
- Company: Globe Metals & Mining Ltd.
- Website: www.globemm.com/kanyika-niobium-project

The Kanyika mine is an open pit mine which extracts niobium ore from a large deposit located in northern Malawi in the Northern Region, about 250 kilometers north of Lilongwe. It will be the second-largest mining operation in the country, behind the Kayelekera mine. Kanyika represents one of the largest niobium mineral resource in Malawi having estimated resources of 60 million tonnes of ore grading 0.29% niobium metal. The mine is the main project of the Australia-based Globe Metals & Mining Ltd.

== History ==
Prospecting began in 2006, when Globe Metals received an Exclusive Prospecting License from the Malawian government. The project was initially planned to be developed as a joint venture between globe and the South Africa based engineering firm Thuthuka Group. In 2011, Globe Metals was joined by the Nanjing based state owned enterprise East China Mineral Exploration and Development Bureau, which acquired a 51% stake in Globe Metals based on a $47 million investment. In 2012, the China Development Bank issued a letter of intent stating that it would finance the kanyika mine. Bulk sampling was completed by early 2014, and 40 tons of crushed samples were sent to the Guangzhou Research Institute for Non-Ferrous Metals, where a pilot plant was constructed. As of 2021, the company obtained a license from the Malawian government to conduct large-scale mining.

The raw ore is intended to be processed in an associated refinery which is to be built. After processing, the final form of the niobium will consist mostly of ferroniobium.

== Environmental and social impacts ==
Globe Metals ordered an environmental impact assessment which was conducted between October 2009 and November 2011 by the South Africa based Synergistics Environmental Services (Pty limited) and was released in July 2012. The assessment raised concerns that water drawn from borehole wells in the area contained levels of uranium already above the World Health Organization's recommendations.

Civil society groups such as the Catholic Commission for Justice and Peace and ActionAid have pushed for residents who will be displaced by the mine to receive adequate consultation and compensation. Inkosi Mabilabo Jere, a Senior Chief of Mzimba, as well as John Alphonsus Ryan, Bishop of Mzuzu have both been critical of the government's lack of compensation for the affected locals. Globe Metals and Mining's executive director, Neville Haxham, has said that the project will create over 1,200 jobs and improve the economic standing of the local population. In August of 2017, a lawsuit was filed in the regional capital of Mzuzu on behalf of 243 households who claimed that they had not been adequately compensated since they were displaced by the mine. A key issue brought up at a mediation hearing in 2018 was households whose land had been disturbed during the exploration phase of the mine.
