= Príkra =

Village in Slovakia

- Municipality
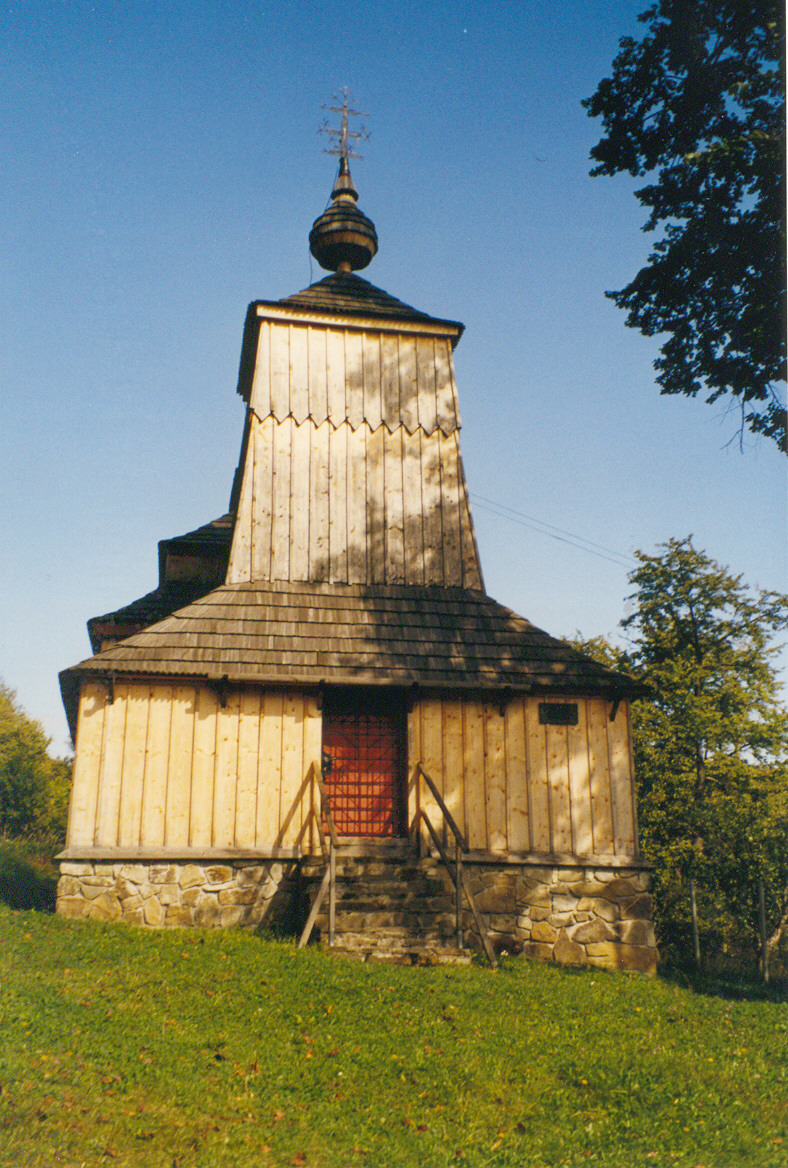

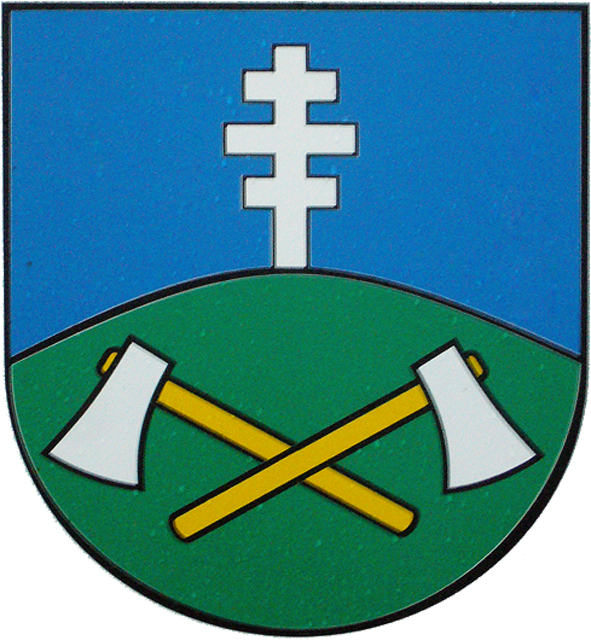
- Flag Coat of arms

- Location of Príkra in the Prešov Region Location of Príkra in Slovakia
- Coordinates: 49.36°N 21.74°E
- Country: Slovakia
- Region: Prešov Region
- District: Svidník District
- First mentioned: 1618

Area
  - Total: 9.32 km^{2} (3.60 sq mi)
- Elevation: 434 m (1,424 ft)

Population (2025)
  - Total: 11

Population by ethnicity (2011)
  - Slovaks: 100.0%

Population by religion (2011)
  - Greek Catholic: 75.0%
  - Roman Catholic: 12.5%
  - Orthodox: 12.5%
- Time zone: UTC+1 (CET)
  - Summer (DST): UTC+2 (CEST)
- Postal code: 900 5
- Area code: +421 54
- Vehicle registration plate (until 2022): SK
- Website: obecprikra.sk

Príkra (Hungarian: Meredély, until 1899: Prikra; Rusyn: Прикра) is a village and municipality in Svidník District in the Prešov Region of north-eastern Slovakia.

== History ==
In historical records the village was first mentioned in 1618.

== Geography ==
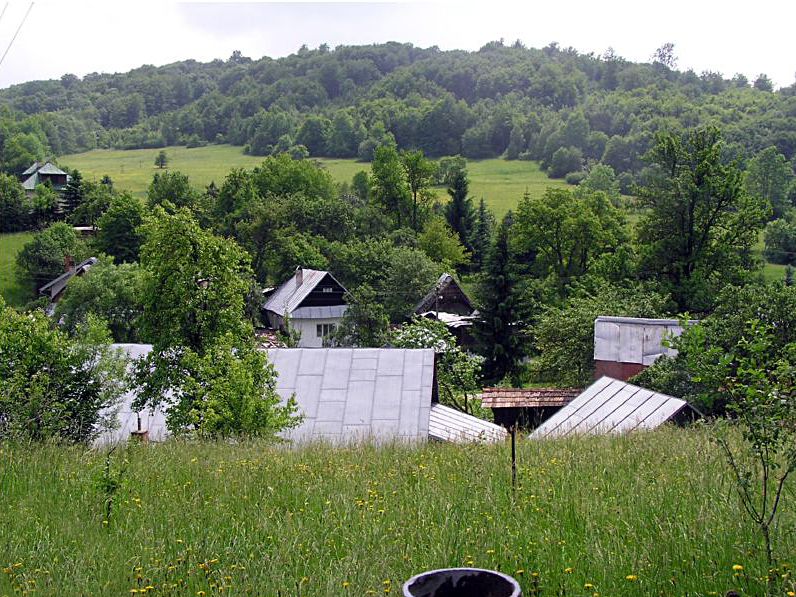
A picture of Príkra

The municipality lies at an altitude of 434 metres (1,424 ft) and covers an area of 9.32 km^{2} (3.60 sq mi) (2025).

== Population ==
Population statistic (10 years)
| Year | 1995 | 2005 | 2015 | 2025 |
|---|---|---|---|---|
| Count | 11 | 8 | 7 | 11 |
| Difference | | −27.27% | −12.5% | +57.14% |

Population statistic
| Year | 2024 | 2025 |
|---|---|---|
| Count | 11 | 11 |
| Difference | | +0% |

It has a population of 11 people (31 December 2025).

=== Ethnicity ===
Census 2021 (1+ %)
| Ethnicity | Number | Fraction |
|---|---|---|
| Slovak | 12 | 100% |
| Rusyn | 5 | 41.66% |
| Total | 12 | |

In year 2021 was 12 people by ethnicity 12 as Slovak and 5 as Rusyn.

Note on population: The difference values of population numbers in the table "Population statistic" and in the sections "Ethnicity" & "Religion" is caused by the use of various statistical methods.

=== Religion ===
Census 2021 (1+ %)
| Religion | Number | Fraction |
|---|---|---|
| Greek Catholic Church | 6 | 50% |
| Roman Catholic Church | 3 | 25% |
| None | 2 | 16.67% |
| Eastern Orthodox Church | 1 | 8.33% |
| Total | 12 | |

In year 2021 was 12 people by religion 6 from Greek Catholic Church, 3 from Roman Catholic Church, 2 from None and 1 from Eastern Orthodox Church.
