= Diocese of Karonga =

Roman Catholic diocese in Malawi

Coordinates: 9.9427°S 33.9320°E

Diocese of Karonga Dioecesis Karongana

Location
- Country: Malawi
- Territory: Chitipa District; Karonga District
- Ecclesiastical province: Lilongwe

Statistics
- Area: 14,000 km^{2} (5,400 sq mi)
- Population: Total; Catholics: (as of 2010); 400,000; 61,000 (15.3%)
- Parishes: 5

Information
- Rite: Roman Rite
- Established: July 21, 2010
- Cathedral: Saint Mary's cathedral
- Secular priests: 9

Current leadership
- Pope: Leo XIV
- Bishop: Martin Anwel Mtumbuka

Website
- karongadiocese.org

The Diocese of Karonga (in Latin: Dioecesis Karongana) is a see of the Roman Catholic Church suffragan of the Roman Catholic Archdiocese of Lilongwe. In 2010, it counted 61,000 baptized people among a population of 400,000 inhabitants. Its current bishop is Martin Anwel Mtumbuka.

Located in the Northern region of Malawi, the Diocese of Karonga occupies a considerable portion of the landlocked country. Malawi, nestled in South Eastern Africa, covers an area of roughly 118,000 km^{2}. It is surrounded by Tanzania to the North East, Zambia to the North West, and Mozambique enveloping both the South East and South West sides.

The Diocese of Karonga, a relatively recent establishment, was created by Pope Benedict XVI on July 21, 2010. Its official inauguration occurred later that year on November 20, coinciding with the consecration of Rt. Rev. Martin Anwel Mtumbuka as the Chief Shepherd of the Diocese. Geographically, the Diocese spans the entirety of Karonga and Chitipa districts, in addition to some northern parts of the Rumphi district.

Prior to the establishment of the Karonga Diocese, this area was governed by the Diocese of Mzuzu as its Northern Deanery, with the administrative center located in the town of Karonga. At its inception, the Karonga Diocese covered an approximate area of 12,000 km^{2}, populated by an estimated 451,861 people. Out of this populace, approximately 60,000 individuals, or 14%, were Catholics.

The 2008 population census recorded the populations of Karonga and Chitipa as 272,789 and 179,072, respectively. Both districts exhibited a population growth rate of 3.5%. Factoring in the populations from parts of Rumphi and this growth rate, the Diocese of Karonga is currently estimated to cater to roughly 590,000 people.

The geographical spread of the Karonga Diocese includes some of the country's most inaccessible regions. Its terrain is flanked by Lake Malawi on the east and mountainous areas on the west, reaching remote locations such as Livingstonia, Nyika plateau, and Misuku hills. Despite Tumbuka being the prevalent language, the residents also communicate in several other languages including Lambya, Ndali, Nyakyusa, and Ngonde.

== Website ==
- www.karongadiocese.org

== Territory ==
The diocese corresponds to the Chitipa District and the Karonga District of the Northern Region of Malawi.

The see is located in the city of Karonga, where the cathedral of Saint Mary stands.

The territory is divided into 5 parishes.

== History ==
The diocese was created on July 21, 2010, with the Papal bull Quo in Malavio of Pope Benedict XVI, taking territories from the Roman Catholic Diocese of Mzuzu. It was originally suffragan of the Roman Catholic Archdiocese of Blantyre.

On February 9, 2011, it entered the ecclesiastical province of the Roman Catholic Archdiocese of Lilongwe.

== Chronology of the bishops ==
- Martin Anwel Mtumbuka since July 21, 2010

== Statistics ==
When it was created, the diocese counted 400,000 inhabitants among whom 61,000 were baptized, which is 15.3%.

| Year | Population | | | Priests | | | | Deacons | Religious | | Parishes |
| | baptised | total | % | number | secular | regular | baptised per priest | | men | women |
| 2010 | 61.000 | 400.000 | 15,3 | 15 | 9 | 6 | 4.067 | | 5 | 40 | 5 |
