= Yohane Suzgo Nyirenda =

Malawian Catholic prelate (born 1976)

The Most Reverend Yohane Suzgo Nyirenda
- Bishop of Mzuzu, Malawi
- Church: Catholic Church
- Archdiocese: Roman Catholic Archdiocese of Lilongwe
- See: Mzuzu
- Appointed: 1 April 2025
- Installed: 3 May 2025
- Predecessor: John Alphonsus Ryan
- Successor: Incumbent
- Other post: Auxiliary Bishop of Muzuzu (5 May 2023 - 1 April 2025)

Orders
- Ordination: 19 July 2008
- Consecration: 5 August 2023 by John Alphonsus Ryan

Personal details
- Born: Yohane Suzgo Nyirenda; 20 June 1976 (age 50) Wozi, Mzimba District, Diocese of Mzuzu, Malawi

Yohane Suzgo Nyirenda (born 20 June 1976) is a Malawian prelate of the Catholic Church who is the Bishop of the Roman Catholic Diocese of Mzuzu, Malawi since 1 April 2025. Before that, from 5 May 2023 until 1 April 2025, he was Auxiliary Bishop of the diocese of Mzuzu. He was appointed as bishop by Pope Francis. He was installed at Mzuzu as auxiliary bishop and as Titular Bishop of Catrum, on 5 August 2023 by the hands of Bishop John Alphonsus Ryan, Bishop of Mzuzu. On 1 April 2025, The Holy Father appointed him to succeed Bishop Bishop John Alphonsus Ryan who resigned as the Local Ordinary of Mzuzu Diocese. Bishop Yohane Suzgo Nyirenda was installed as Bishop of Mzuzu on 3 May 2025.

== Early life and education ==
He was born on 20 June 1976 in Wozi, Mzimba District, Diocese of Mzuzu in Malawi. He holds a Diploma in Ecclesiastical Canon Law, awarded by the Catholic University of Eastern Africa, in Nairobi, Kenya. His Diploma in Religious Formation and Spirituality, was obtained from Lumen Christi Institute, in Arusha, Tanzania.

== Priest ==
He was ordained priest of Mzuzu Diocese on 19 Jul 2008. While a priest, he served as Director of Kasina Formation Centre from 2019 until 2023, Director and Formator at Christ the King Formation Centre in Rumphi, Parish Priest of Saint Augustine Parish and Vocations Director in Mzuzu Diocese.

== Bishop ==
On 5 May 2023, Pope Francis appointed Father Yohane Suzgo Nyirenda as auxiliary bishop of Mzuzu Diocese, Malawi. He was contemporaneously appointed Titular Bishop of Catrum.

He was consecrated and installed on 5 August 2023 by Bishop John Alphonsus Ryan, Bishop of Mzuzu assisted by Archbishop George Desmond Tambala, Archbishop of Lilongwe, Archbishop Thomas Luke Msusa, Archbishop of Blantyre and Bishop Martin Anwel Mtumbuka, Bishop of Karonga. The ceremony was held at Mzuzu Stadium.

On 1 April 2025, Pope Francis accepted the resignation from pastoral care of Mzuzu Catholic Diocese presented by Bishop John Alphonsus Ryan. The Holy Father appointed Bishop Yohane Suzgo Nyirenda as his replacement. Bishop Nyirenda was installed as Local Ordinary at Mzuzu on 3 May 2025.

== See also ==
- Catholic Church in Malawi

== Succession table ==
Catholic Church titles
Vacant	Auxiliary Bishop of Mzuzu; 5 May 2023 - 1 April 2025	Succeeded by
Preceded by John Alphonsus Ryan (26 April 2016 - 1 April 2025)	Bishop of Mzuzu; Since 1 April 2025	Succeeded by Incumbent
