= St. Sebastian's Cathedral, Bratislava =

St. Sebastian's Cathedral
- Katedrála sv. Šebastiána
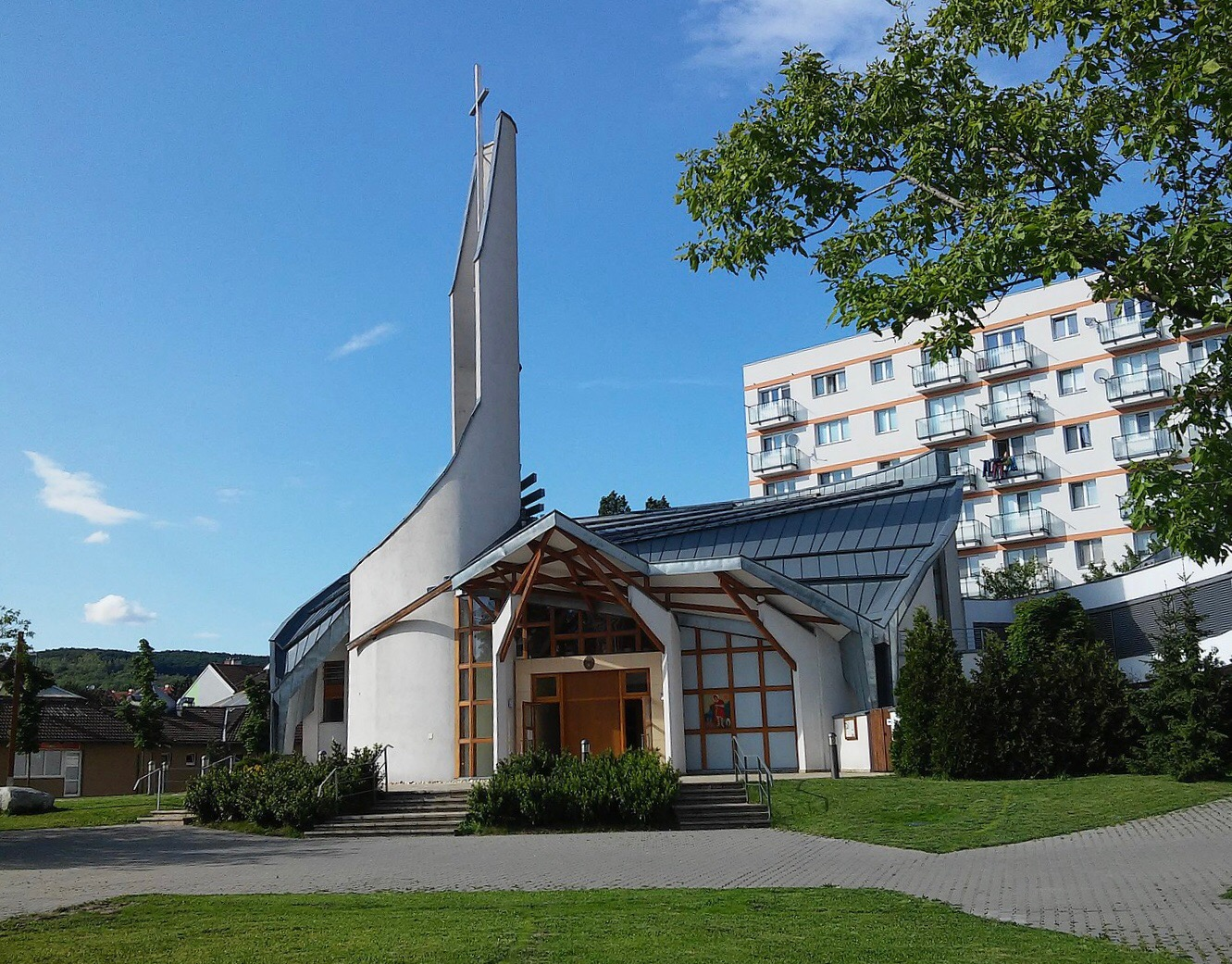
- St. Sebastian's Cathedral
- 48°11′45″N 17°8′35″E
- Location: Bratislava
- Country: Slovakia
- Denomination: Roman Catholic Church

St. Sebastian's Cathedral (Slovak: Katedrála sv. Šebastiána) in Bratislava, also called the Cathedral of the Military Ordinariate, is the seat of the Catholic Military Ordinariate of Slovakia.

The first stone church was laid in 1995 and was consecrated in 2003 by Pope John Paul II. However, construction did not begin until the spring of 2007, as permission to build was not received until January 2007. The project architect was Ladislav Banhegyi. The roof was built in 2008. The structure was consecrated on June 13, 2009, by Archbishop Stanislav Zvolenský, and designated the seat of the military ordinariate the same year.

== See also ==
- Catholic Church in Slovakia

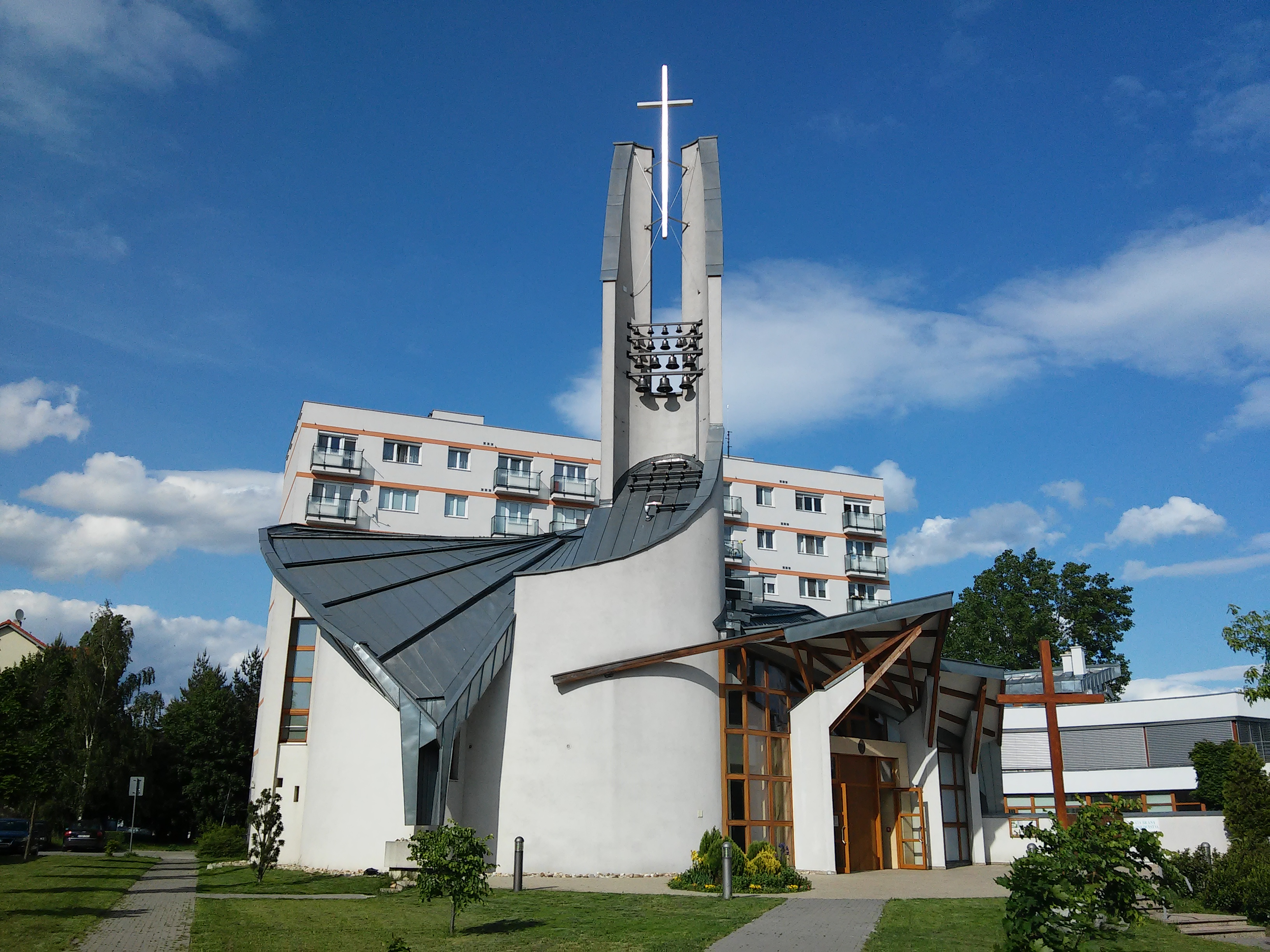
Another view
