= František Rábek =

Slovak Roman Catholic prelate (born 1949)

His Excellency František Rábek
- Ordinary Emeritus of the Military Ordinariate of Slovakia
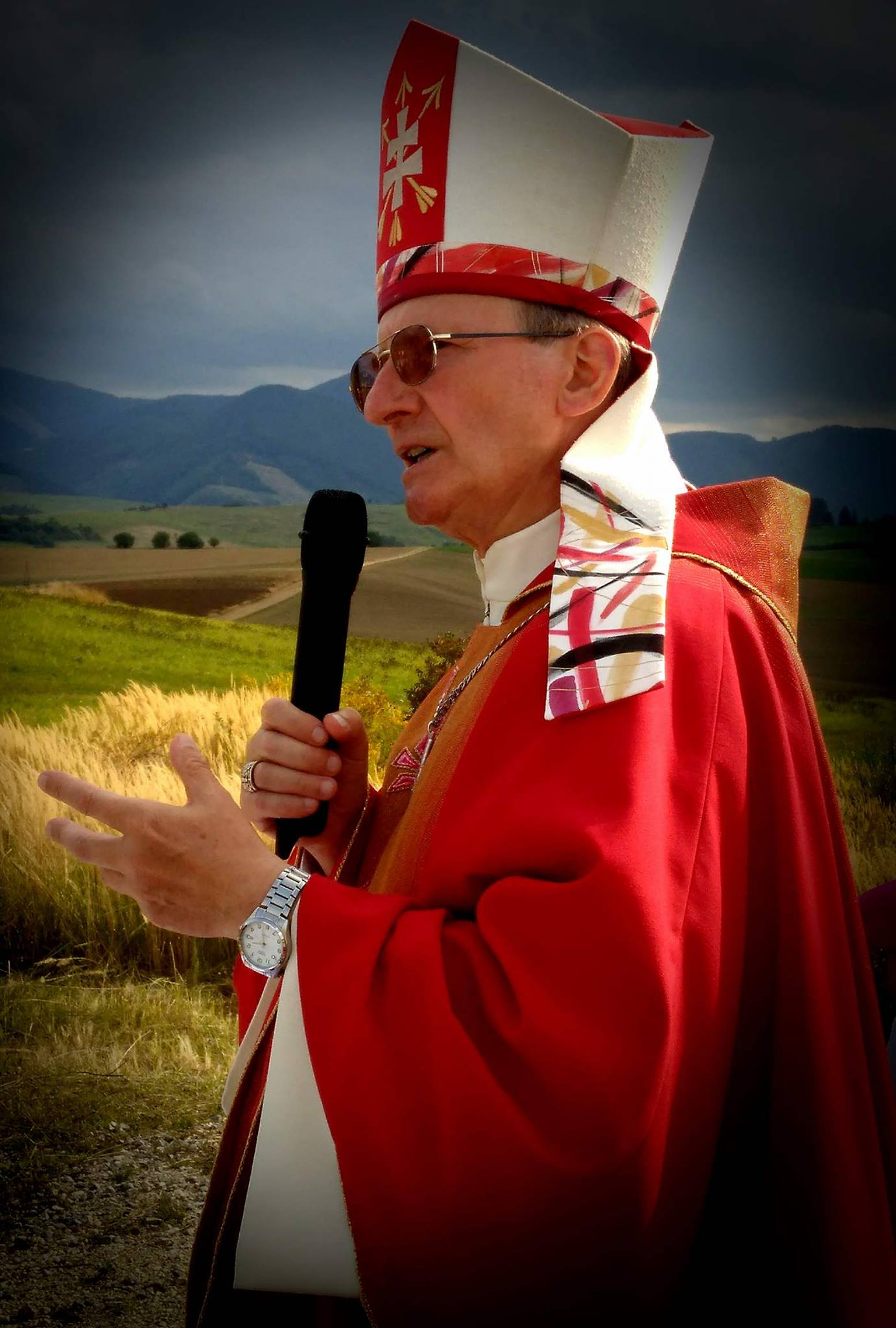
- Rábek in 2017
- Church: Roman Catholic
- Appointed: 20 January 2003
- Term ended: 27 May 2025
- Predecessor: Office created
- Successor: Pavol Šajgalík
- Previous post: Auxiliary bishop of Nitra (1991–2003)

Orders
- Ordination: 17 June 1972
- Consecration: 27 July 1991 by Ján Chryzostom Korec

Personal details
- Born: 17 February 1949 (age 77) Močenok, Czechoslovakia
- Motto: Esto fidelis usque ad mortem (Latin for 'To be faithful until death')
- Coat of arms: František Rábek's coat of arms

František Rábek (born 17 February 1949) a Slovak prelate of the Roman Catholic Church. He was the first ordinary of the Military Ordinariate of Slovakia from its establishment in 2003 to his retirement in 2025.

== Biography ==
František Rábek was born on 17 February 1949 in the village of Močenok, in Šaľa District. Following his studies of theology at the Comenius University he was ordained priest on 17 June 1972. Afterwards, he served as a chaplain in Bošany and in Nitra and later a parish priest in Nitra, Drážovce and Čierne. On 13 July 1991 he was named the auxiliary bishop of the Roman Catholic Diocese of Nitra and the titular bishop of Catrum by the Pope John Paul II. He was consecrated on 27 July 1991 by the Cardinal Ján Chryzostom Korec. On 20 January 2003 he became the first ordinary of the newly created Military Ordinariate of Slovakia.

In 2024, Rábek applied for retirement due to reaching the age of 75. In May 2025, Pope Leo XIV accepted Rábek's request and named the Capuchin friar Pavol Šajgalík as his replacement.
