= John Alphonsus Ryan =

Irish Catholic bishop and academic

John Alphonsus Ryan S.P.S.
- Bishop Emeritus of Mzuzu
- Church: Catholic Church
- Diocese: Diocese of Mzuzu
- In office: 26 April 2016 – 1 April 2025
- Predecessor: Joseph Mukasa Zuza
- Successor: Yohane Suzgo Nyirenda

Orders
- Ordination: 18 June 1978 by Thomas Morris
- Consecration: 27 August 2016 by Martin Anwel Mtumbuka

Personal details
- Born: 27 February 1952 (age 74) Tipperary, County Tipperary, Republic of Ireland

Bishop John Alphonsus Ryan S.P.S. (b. 27 February 1952), is an Irish Catholic bishop and academic, who was the Bishop of Mzuzu Bishop of Mzuzu in Malawi. Ryan was born in Holy Cross, Thurles, Co. Tipperary. He joined the Saint Patrick’s Society for the Foreign Missions (Kiltegan Fathers), studying theology in Kiltegan, Wicklow, and Philosophy and Mathematics in University College Cork, gaining a Masters and Doctorate in Mathematics (his doctorate on "Irreducible Goppa Codes" was done with Pat Fitzpatrick). Professor Ryan came to Malawi in 1978 shortly after his ordination.

== Priesthood and career ==
Before being named Bishop of Mzuzu, Ryan lectured in mathematics in Mzuzu University, and where he was a chaplain and professor of Mathematics beginning in 2000. His academic interests revolve around Coding Theory.

== Episcopacy ==
In 2016 Pope Francis named Ryan as Bishop of Mzuzu. Ryan filled an empty see that had been vacated when Joseph Mukasa Zuza died on in an accident 15 January 2015. He resigned on 1 April 2025
