= Močenok =

Močenok Mocsonok
- Municipality
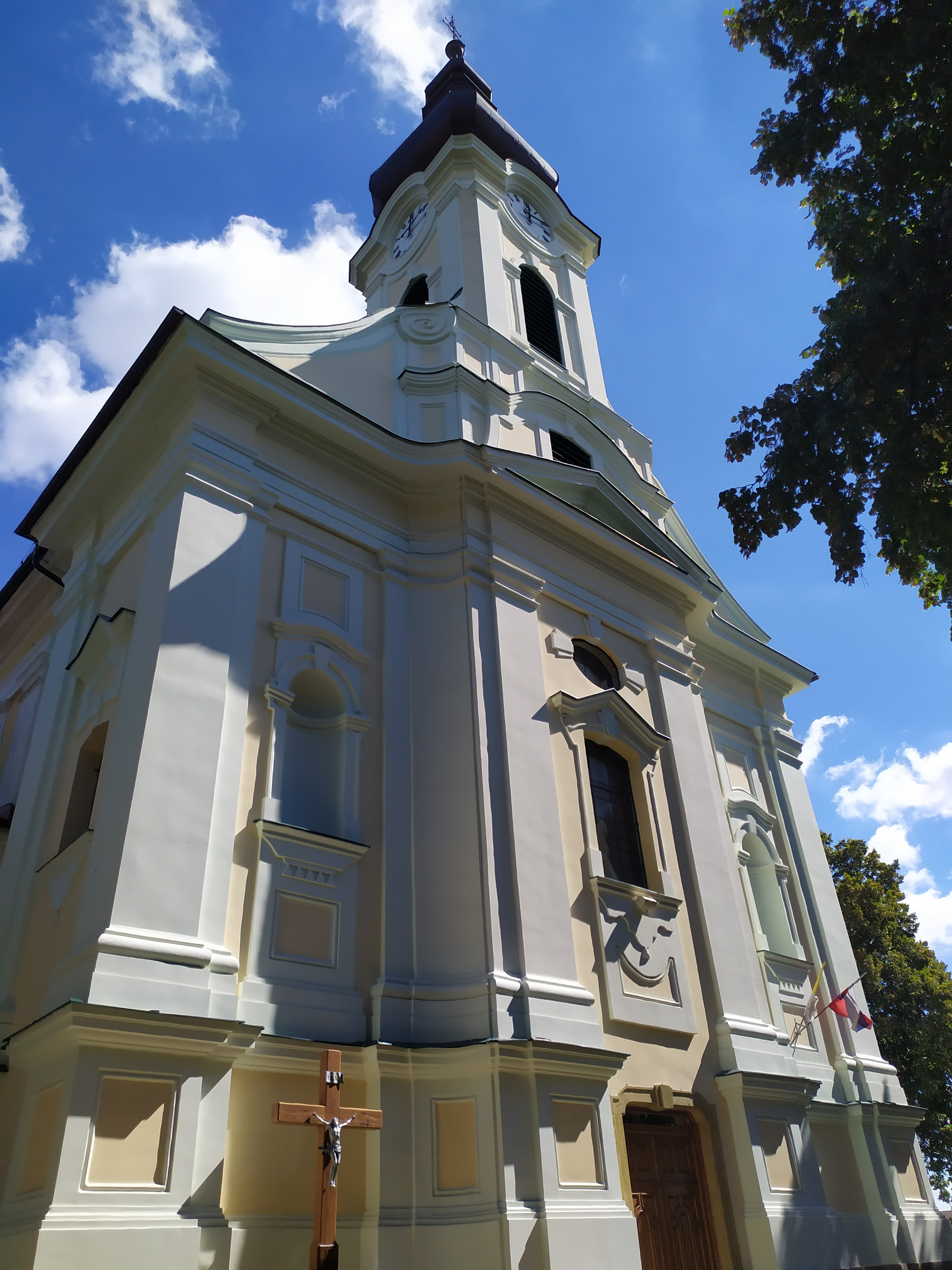
- Church of Saint Clement

- Flag

- Location of Močenok in the Nitra Region Location of Močenok in Slovakia
- Coordinates: 48.23°N 17.93°E
- Country: Slovakia
- Region: Nitra Region
- District: Šaľa District
- First mentioned: 1113

Area
  - Total: 46.39 km^{2} (17.91 sq mi)
- Elevation: 130 m (430 ft)

Population (2025)
  - Total: 4,280
- Time zone: UTC+1 (CET)
  - Summer (DST): UTC+2 (CEST)
- Postal code: 951 31
- Area code: +421 37
- Vehicle registration plate (until 2022): SA
- Website: mocenok.sk

Močenok (Hungarian: Mocsonok) is a village and municipality in Šaľa District, in the Nitra Region of south-west Slovakia.

== Names and etymology ==
The name is derived from Slavic mučeník – a martyr and is probably related to the cult of Saint Clement of Rome (a patron of the local church) whose relics were brought through Great Moravia to the Rome by Saint Cyril. The village was renamed to Mučníky in 1948, to Sládečkovce in 1951 (after a victim of a farmer strike from 1922) and returned to the original name in 1992.

== History ==
In historical records the village was first mentioned in 1113.

== Geography ==
The municipality lies at an altitude of 130 metres (430 ft) and covers an area of 46.39 km^{2} (17.91 sq mi) (2025).

== Population ==
Population statistic (10 years)
Year	1995	2005	2015	2025
Count	4269	4376	4289	4280
Difference		+2.50%	−1.98%	−0.20%

Population statistic
Year	2024	2025
Count	4306	4280
Difference		−0.60%

It has a population of 4280 people (31 December 2025).

=== Ethnicity ===
Census 2021 (1+ %)
Ethnicity	Number	Fraction
Slovak	4030	92.51%
Not found out	281	6.45%
Hungarian	65	1.49%
Total	4356	

In year 2021 was 4356 people by ethnicity 4030 as Slovak, 281 as Not found out, 65 as Hungarian, 17 as Czech, 9 as Romani, 4 as Ukrainian, 4 as Russian, 4 as Other, 3 as German, 2 as Romanian, 1 as Jewish, 1 as Serbian, 1 as Polish and 1 as Moravian.

Note on population: The difference values of population numbers in the table "Population statistic" and in the sections "Ethnicity" & "Religion" is caused by the use of various statistical methods.

=== Religion ===
Census 2021 (1+ %)
Religion	Number	Fraction
Roman Catholic Church	3275	75.18%
None	625	14.35%
Not found out	337	7.74%
Total	4356	

In year 2021 was 4356 people by religion 3275 from Roman Catholic Church, 625 from None, 337 from Not found out, 27 from Evangelical Church, 22 from Christian Congregations in Slovakia, 16 from Other, 13 from Greek Catholic Church, 13 from Ad hoc movements, 6 from Calvinist Church, 4 from Other and not ascertained christian church, 4 from United Methodist Church, 3 from Eastern Orthodox Church, 2 from Paganism and natural spirituality, 2 from Jehovah's Witnesses, 2 from Church of the Brethren, 2 from Seventh-day Adventist Church, 2 from Buddhism and 1 from Apostolic Church.

== Facilities ==
The village has a pharmacy, a public library a gym and a football pitch. It also has a cinema.

== Notable people ==
- František Rábek (born 1949) - Catholic Prelate
- Timotej Kudlička (born 2003)- Slovak footballer
