= Ludzi Girls' Secondary School =

School in Malawi

Ludzi Girls Secondary School

Location
- Mchinji; Malawi; 13.764°S 32.987°E

Information
- Established: 1968

Ludzi Girls' Secondary School is a Catholic secondary boarding school for girls, located in Mchinji. The school began in 1968.

== History ==
The school was founded in 1968 and it is supported by the Sisters of the Charity of Ottawa.

During the school's celebrations of fifty years of education in 2018, Bishop Martin Anwel Mtumbuka was present. He criticised the country's Ministry of Education and what he considered their poor support for church-based schools. The ministry issued a statement that rejected his accusation, but the church supported the bishop while reaffirming its commitment to education.

On 14 November 2023 the school was visited by Amal Clooney, Michelle Obama and Melinda French Gates who were visiting the area. They were campaigning to reduce child marriage. They observed an inititative called Creating Healthy Approaches to Success (CHATS) organised by AGE Africa which aims to support girls to complete their four-year education and obtain a Malawi School Certificate of Education. One of the girls they met was a thirteen-year-old mother.

== Notable alumni ==
Dr Maureen Chirwa
