= Pavol Šajgalík (bishop) =

Slovak Roman Catholic prelate (born 1949)

His Excellency Pavol Šajgalík
- Ordinary of the Military Ordinariate of Slovakia
- Church: Roman Catholic
- Appointed: 27 May 2025
- Predecessor: František Rábek

Orders
- Ordination: 15 August 1993
- Consecration: 18 October 2025 by František Rábek

Personal details
- Born: 13 November 1964 (age 61) Bratislava, Czechoslovakia
- Education: University of Vienna
- Coat of arms

Pavol Šajgalík (born 13 November 1964) a Slovak prelate of the Roman Catholic Church. He has served as the bishop-ordinary of the Military Ordinariate of Slovakia since 2025.

== Biography ==
Pavol Šajgalík was born on 13 November 1964 in Bratislava. He was educated at the grammar school in Bratislava and studied electrical engineering at the Slovak University of Technology in Bratislava, graduating in 1988. During his studies, at the age of 22, he joined the Order of Friars Minor Capuchin and, lacking the official content from authorities of Communist Czechoslovakia, he secretly studied theology. After the Velvet Revolution, he studied pastoral theology at the University of Vienna. He made his perpetual vows on 25 March 1993, and was ordained a priest on 15 August 1993. In 1995, he graduated and returned to Slovakia to serve various functions with his Order. In 2004, he joined the newly established military ordinate of Slovakia and was responsible for pastoral care of police officers in Bratislava. Between 2010 and 2014 he was responsible for pastoral care at the Saint Michal Hospital in Bratislava. In 2014, he obtained a doctorate in pastoral theology from the University of Vienna. From 2019 to 2025 he was responsible for pastoral care of Slovaks in Switzerland. In 2025, Šajgalík was named bishop of the Military Ordinariate of Slovakia by the Pope Leo XIV.
