= Military Ordinariate of Slovakia =

Roman Catholic ecclesiastical jurisdiction in Slovakia

Military Ordinariate of Slovakia Vojenský ordinariát
- Coat of Arms of the Military Ordinariate of Slovakia

Location
- Country: Slovakia

Information
- Denomination: Roman Catholic
- Sui iuris church: Latin Church
- Rite: Latin Rite
- Established: 20 January 2003 (22 years ago)

Current leadership
- Pope: Leo XIV
- Bishop: Pavol Šajgalík
- Bishops emeritus: František Rábek

The Military Ordinariate of Slovakia (Slovak: Vojenský ordinariát) is a Latin military ordinariate of the Roman Catholic Church for the Slovak armed forces.

It is exempt and immediately subject to the Holy See(not part of any ecclesiastical province and its Roman Congregation for Bishops).

The episcopal see is Saint Sebastian's Cathedral (Katedrála sv. Šebastiána) in the Slovak capital of Bratislava. Prior to 2009, the seat was the Trinitarian Church in the same city, formally the Cathedral of St. John of Matha and St. Felix of Valois (Katedrála sv. Jána a sv. Felixa z Valois).

== History ==
The military ordinariate, without precursor, was established by Pope John Paul II on 20 January 2003, ten years after the country's independence by the dissolution of Czechoslovakia.

== Statistics ==
As per 2014, it provides pastoral care to Roman Catholics serving in the Slovak Armed Forces and their families in 56 parishes with 54 priests (46 diocesan, 8 religious), 1 deacon and 8 lay religious brothers.

== Military ordinaries ==
- František Rábek (incumbent, 20 January 2003 – 27 May 2025), previously Auxiliary Bishop of Nitra (Slovakia) (1991.07.13 – 2003.01.20) and Titular Bishop of Catrum (1991.07.13 – 2003.01.20)
- Pavol Šajgalík (incumbent, since 27 May 2025)

== See also ==
- List of Roman Catholic dioceses in Slovakia

== Sources and external links ==
- Military Ordinariate of Slovakia (Catholic-Hierarchy)
- GCatholic.org, with Google map and satellite photo
- picasaweb.google.com St.Sebastian cathedral
