= Catholic Church in Slovakia =

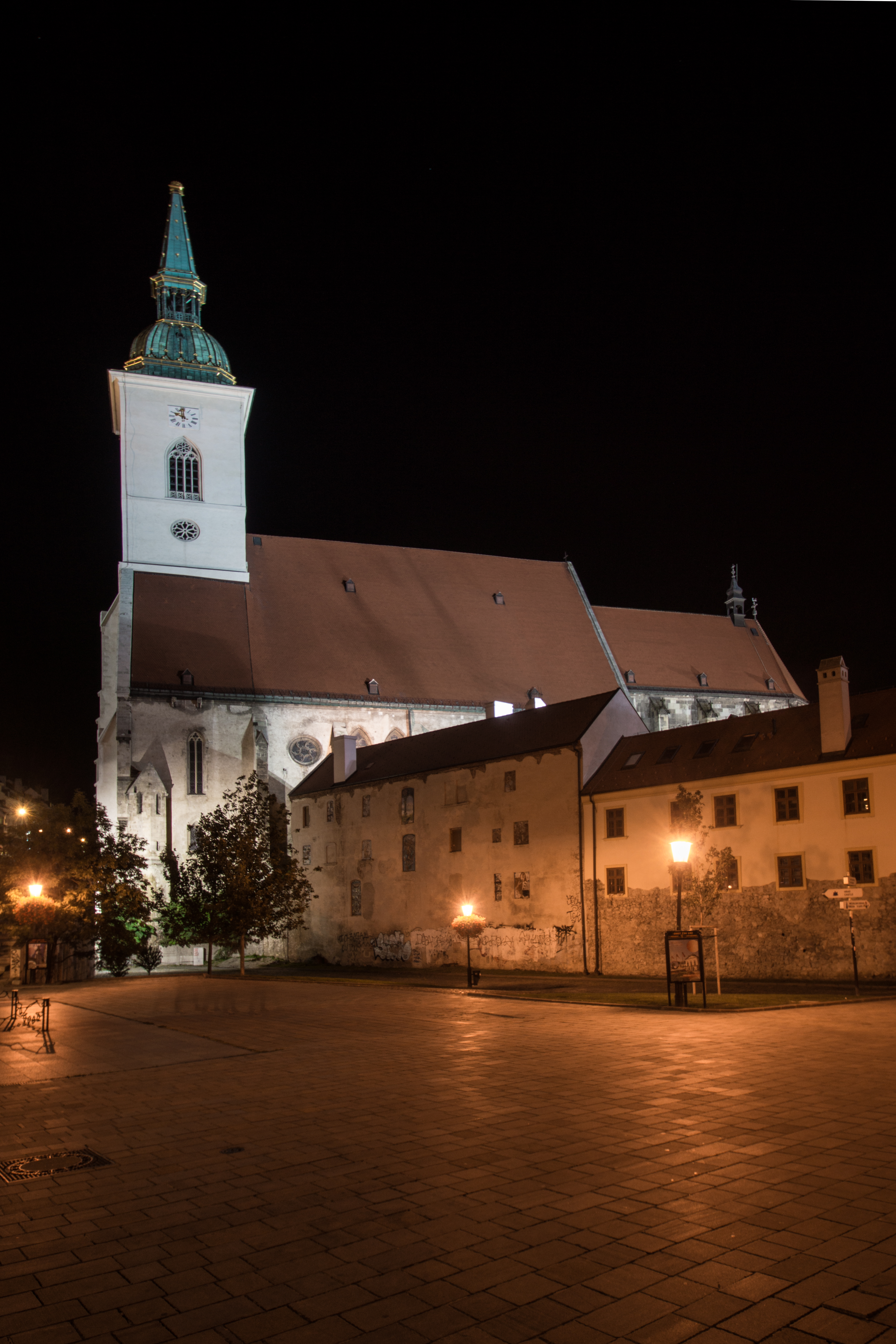
St. Martin's Cathedral, Bratislava

The Catholic Church in Slovakia is part of the worldwide Catholic Church, under the spiritual leadership of the Pope in Rome.

According to the 2021 census, around 55.8% of the total population was Latin (Roman) Catholic and another 3.8% is Greek Catholic. The country is divided into 8 Latin dioceses including 3 archdioceses, and there is also a separate Metropolitan jurisdiction for those of the Byzantine Rite, see Slovak Greek Catholic Church.

In 2020, there were over 3,000 priests and almost 2,000 nuns serving across more than 1,500 parishes.

By taking the percentage of the current practitioners of the Vatican City-led Catholic Christianity as an indicator, Slovakia (59.8% practicing Catholics) is third most Catholic-majority Slavic country in Europe after Poland (71.3% practicing Catholics) and Croatia (79.0% practicing Catholics).

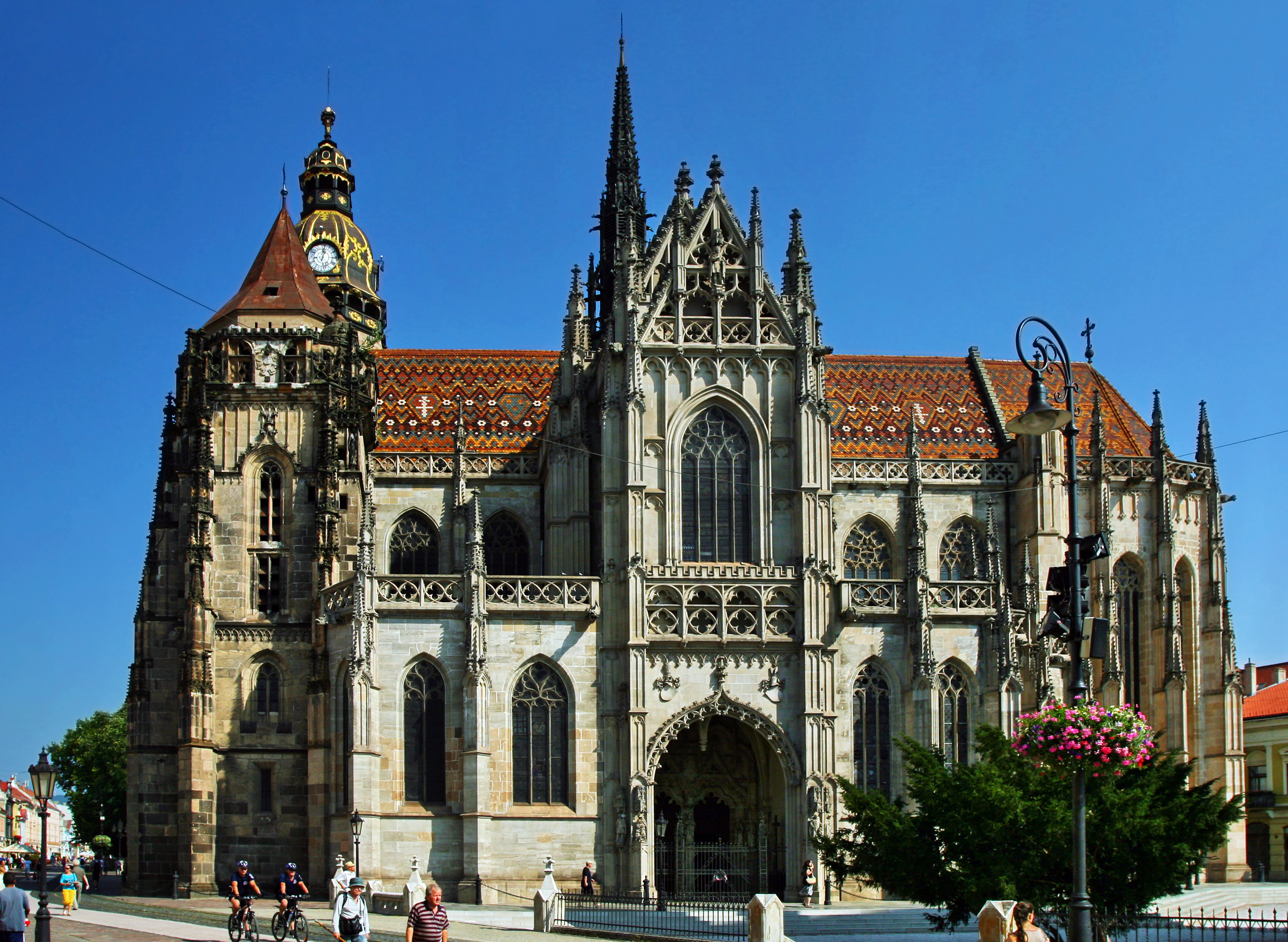
Cathedral of St Elizabeth, Košice

== Structure ==
=== Roman Catholic ===
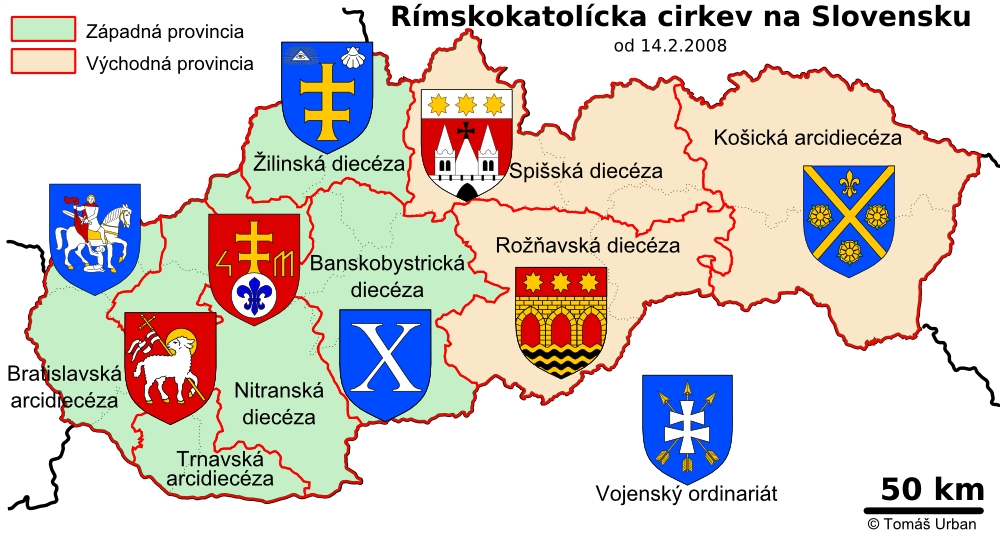
Latin rite dioceses in Slovakia

- Archdiocese of Bratislava with the following suffragans:
  - Archdiocese of Trnava
  - Diocese of Nitra
  - Diocese of Žilina
  - Diocese of Banská Bystrica
- Archdiocese of Košice with the following suffragans:
  - Diocese of Spiš
  - Diocese of Rožňava
- Military Ordinariate of Slovakia

=== Greek Catholic ===
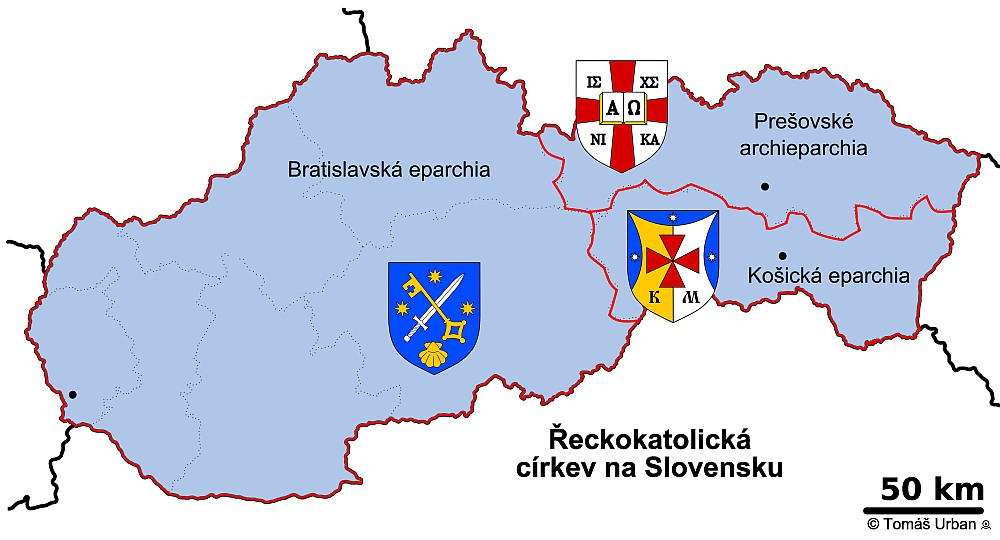
Byzantine rite eparchies in Slovakia

- Archeparchy of Prešov with the following suffragans:
  - Eparchy of Bratislava
  - Eparchy of Košice

== Catholic organizations ==
- eRko: Catholic children and youth organization, member of Fimcap and CIDSE
- Caritas Slovakia: one of the largest charitable organisations in the country and the largest Catholic charity

== See also ==
- Apostolic Nunciature to Slovakia
- Apostolic Nunciature to Czechoslovakia
- List of Catholic dioceses in Slovakia
- Orthodox Church of the Czech Lands and Slovakia
- Religion in Slovakia
- Ruthenian Greek Catholic Church
- Slovak Greek Catholic Church
