= List of Catholic dioceses in Slovakia =

There are two ecclesiastical provinces of the Latin Church of the Catholic church in Slovakia. Under 2 archdioceses, there are 6 suffragan dioceses. There is also a military ordinariate that is not part of either ecclesiastical province.

In addition, there is one ecclesiastical territory of the Slovak Greek Catholic Church. Under the one archeparchy, are two eparchies.

There are no titular sees or other defunct jurisdictions other than direct precursors of current dioceses.

== Latin Hierarchy ==
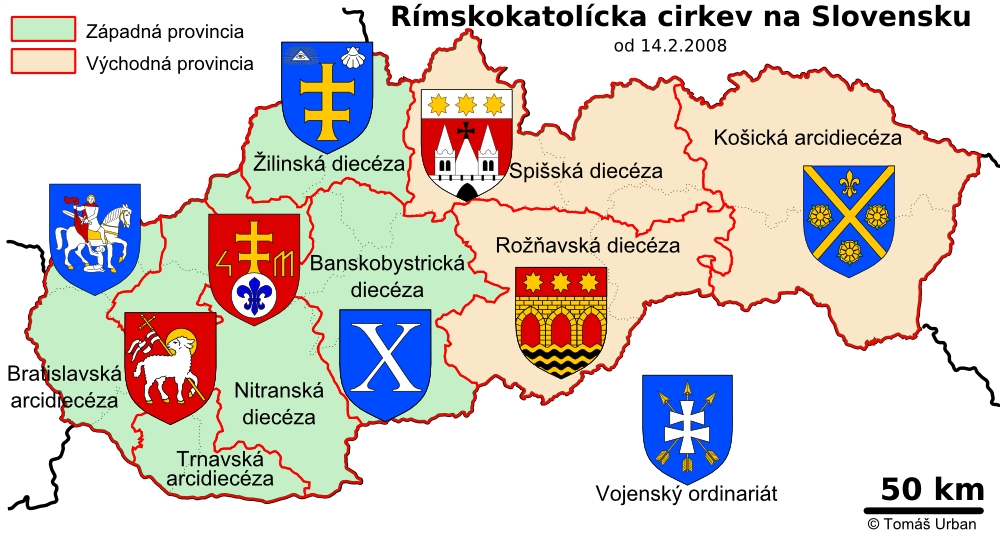
Latin rite dioceses in Slovakia

=== Exempt ===
- Military Ordinariate of Slovakia

=== Ecclesiastical Province of Bratislava ===
- Metropolitan Archdiocese of Bratislava
  - Archdiocese of Trnava
  - Diocese of Banská Bystrica
  - Diocese of Nitra
  - Diocese of Žilina

=== Ecclesiastical Province of Košice ===
- Metropolitan Archdiocese of Košice
  - Diocese of Rožňava
  - Diocese of Spiš

== Slovak Greek Catholic Ecclesiastical Province of Prešov ==
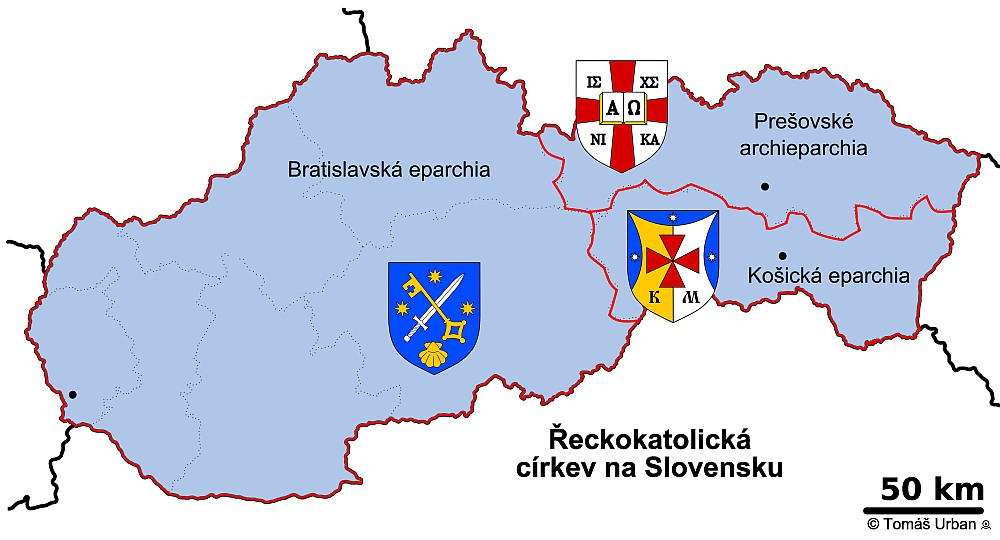
Byzantine rite eparchies in Slovakia

(Byzantine Rite)

- Metropolitan Archeparchy of Prešov, also Chief of the entire rite-specific particular church
  - Eparchy of Bratislava
  - Eparchy of Košice

== External links and sources ==
- Catholic-Hierarchy entry.
- GCatholic.org.
