= Joseph Mukasa Zuza =

Roman Catholic bishop (1955–2015)

- Bishop of Mzuzu
- Church: Catholic Church
- Diocese: Diocese of Mzuzu
- In office: 3 March 1995 – 15 January 2015
- Predecessor: Jean-Louis Jobidon
- Successor: John Alphonsus Ryan

Orders
- Ordination: 25 July 1982
- Consecration: 6 May 1995 by Giuseppe Leanza

Personal details
- Born: 2 October 1955 Malembo, Portuguese West Africa, Portuguese Empire
- Died: 15 January 2015 (aged 59)

Joseph Mukasa Zuza (2 October 1955 – 15 January 2015) was a Roman Catholic bishop. Born in Malembo, Angola, Zuza was ordained in 1982 to serve in the Diocese of Mzuzu, Malawi. He was appointed Bishop of the Mzuzu Diocese in 1995. He died at age 59 in a road accident while still in office.
