= Martin Anwel Mtumbuka =

Malawian prelate of the Catholic Church (born 1957)

The Right Reverend Martin Anwel Mtumbuka
- Bishop of Karonga
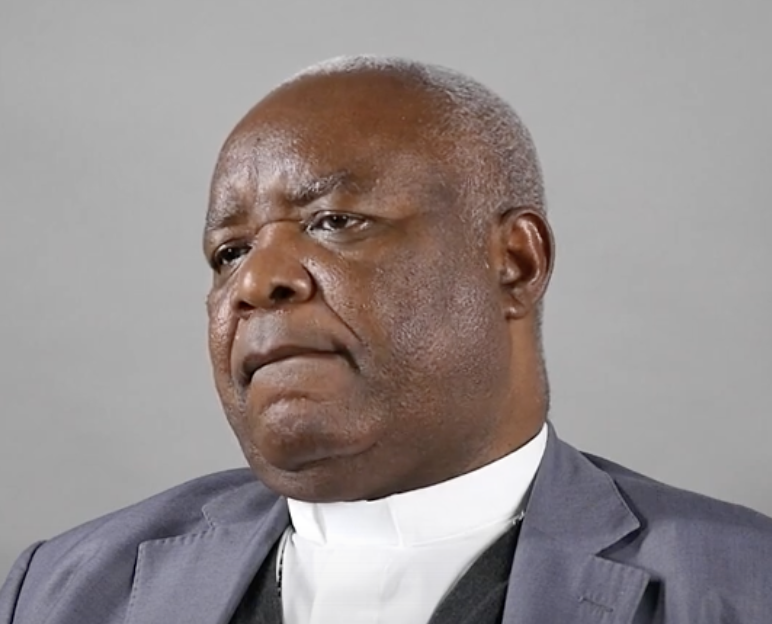
- Church: Roman Catholic Church
- Archdiocese: Roman Catholic Archdiocese of Lilongwe
- Diocese: Diocese of Karonga
- Appointed: 21 July 2010
- Predecessor: None

Orders
- Ordination: 31 July 1988
- Consecration: 20 November 2010 by Nicola Girasoli
- Rank: Bishop

Personal details
- Born: 5 August 1957 (age 69) Majimbula Village, Rumphi District, Mzuzu Diocese, Malawi

Styles of Martin Anwel Mtumbuka
- Reference style: His Excellency; The Right Reverend
- Spoken style: Your Excellency
- Religious style: Bishop

Martin Anwel Mtumbuka is a Malawian Roman Catholic church prelate currently serving as bishop of the Roman Catholic Diocese of Karonga in Malawi. The diocese was erected by Pope Benedict XVI in 2010 and he appointed Bishop Mtumbuka as its first bishop.

== Background and education ==
He was born on 5 August 1967 in Majimbula Village, Rumphi District, Mzuzu Diocese, in Malawi. He attended primary school in Chilulu. For his secondary school education, he studied at the Mzuzu Minor Seminary.

He studied philosophy at Saint Anthony's Seminary in Kachebere, Mchinji District, Central Region, Malawi, after which he studied Theology at the Theological Seminary in Zomba, Zomba District, Southern Region, Malawi. He studied at Mater Dei Institute of Education, in Ireland from 1997 until 2002, graduating with a Master's degree in Religious Science from there. From 2002 until 2005, he studied at the University of London, where he obtained a Doctor of Philosophy degree, in the Science of Education.

== Priest ==
He was ordained priest on 31 July 1988 for the Roman Catholic Diocese of Mzuzu.

While a priest of Mzuzu Diocese, he served in various roles, including as:

- Assistant priest at the cathedral of Mzuzu, from 1988 until 1990
- Rector of St. Patrick Minor Seminary, from 1990 until 1993
- Rector of the Minor Seminary of Mzuzu from 2002 until 2005
- Vice-chancellor of the Catholic University of Malawi, Archdiocese of Blantyre, from 2005 until 2010.

== Bishop ==
On 21 July 2010, Pope Benedict XVI created the Roman Catholic Diocese of Karonga, Malawi, by splitting the Diocese of Mzuzu. On the same day, The Holy Father appointed Reverend Martin Anwel Mtumbuka, of the clergy of Mzuzu and Vice-chancellor of the Catholic University of Malawi to be the founding Bishop of Karonga.

He was consecrated and installed bishop on 20 November 2010 by Archbishop Nicola Girasoli, Titular Archbishop of Egnazia Appula and Papal Nuncio assisted by Archbishop Tarcisius Gervazio Ziyaye, Archbishop of Blantyre and Bishop Joseph Mukasa Zuza, Bishop of Mzuzu.

During his time in office, Bishop Mtumbuka has been a strong advocate for the poor, at times criticizing the government for not doing enough to alleviate suffering. During the celebrations of fifty years of education at Ludzi Girls Secondary School, he criticised the country's Ministry of Education and what he considered their poor support for church based schools. The ministry issued a statement that rejected his accusation.

In 2021, he chided government officials for not doing enough saying "the state of the economy is negatively affecting the welfare of people, especially the rural masses who are mostly poor."
