= Kayelekera mine =

Uranium mine in Malawi

- Location within Malawi
- Location: Karonga District, Northern Region, Malawi; 9.9928°S 33.6981°E
- Company: Lotus Resources Limited (85%); Government of Malawi (15%)
- Website: lotusresources.com.au/kayelekera-overview/

Kayelekera uranium mine is an open cast uranium mine 52 kilometers west of the regional administrative and commercial centre Karonga in Malawi, Africa and was the country's largest mine. Production at the mine has been paused since February 2014, due to a fall in global uranium prices.

== History ==
Kayelekera was owned 100% by Paladin (Africa) Limited (PAL), an 85% subsidiary of Australian and Canadian listed Paladin Energy and in July 2009, Paladin issued 15% of the equity in Paladin (Africa) Ltd to the Government of Malawi under the terms of the Mining Development Agreement signed between PAL and the Government in February 2007. The mine was officially opened on 17 April 2009 by the then Malawian president Bingu wa Mutharika. In 2014, the mine entered care and maintenance mode owing to a depressed uranium market. While in production, the mine exported containers of uranium oxide via the port of Walvis Bay. The mine has not been profitable for its operators and has met opposition from organisations and individuals concerned about the mine's tax concessions, operation, adherence to law and regulation and its potential impacts on human and environmental safety. In 2020, Paladin sold its 85% interest in the project to Lotus Resources (65%) and Lily Resources (20%). In 2021, Lotus acquired Lily's stake.

In November 2026 the mine began its first exports in four years. This was the country's first export of yellowcake sine the Australian Lotus company's takeover. 145,000 pounds of ore was shipped out in four containers bound for processing in France. This would arrive at the end of the year after travelling through Zambia and Namibia. It was anticipated that the ore would make a significant contribution to the country's finances.

== Incidents ==
=== Worker fatalities ===
==== Khwima Phiri ====
On July 30, 2013, mine employee Khwima Phiri was killed after being struck by a wheel that he was inflating.

==== Francis Mikonda ====
Francis Mikonda commenced work as a process operator at the Kayelekera mine on October 23, 2010. In 2012, he began to suffer from leg pains. An MRI scan of Mikonda's lumbar region conducted on December 28, 2012, revealed "diffuse marrow replacement and diffuse spondylosis from L2-3 to L5-S1, with moderate spiral stenosis at L4-5 and irritation of the right L4 nerve root." On January 17, 2013, he collapsed at work and was admitted to hospital suffering from fractures of left and right thigh bones. His right leg required amputation. On September 11, 2013, Mikondo died from cancer. Paladin denied that Mikonda's death was the result of exposure to radioactive substances.

=== Transport spill of uranium oxide ===
In February 2014, a truck rollover resulted in the rupture of a container of uranium oxide.

=== Storm surge liquid discharge ===
In January 2015, a stormwater surge caused the liner in a plant run-off tank to rupture, resulting in approximately 50 litres of liquid overflowing from a bunded area. Media reports claimed that the mine had begun to discharge wastes into the local river system, which Paladin refuted. Paladin stated that such reports originated from 'hostile' NGOs and contained "numerous blatant falsehoods and misleading statements, intended to cause alarm and distress in communities living in the vicinity of Kayelekera and the local river system."

== See also ==
- Kanyika mine
