= Diocese of Mzuzu =

Roman Catholic diocese in Malawi

Coordinates: 11.4520°S 34.0262°E

Diocese of Mzuzu Dioecesis Mzuzuensis

Location
- Country: Malawi
- Ecclesiastical province: Lilongwe

Statistics
- Area: 21,500 km^{2} (8,300 sq mi)
- Population: Total; Catholics: (as of 2025); 1,858,940; 730,500 (39.3%)
- Parishes: 19

Information
- Rite: Roman Rite
- Established: January 17, 1961
- Cathedral: Saint Peter's Cathedral
- Patron saint: Carolus Lwanga
- Secular priests: 37

Current leadership
- Pope: Leo XIV
- Bishop: Yohane Suzgo Nyirenda

The Roman Catholic Diocese of Mzuzu (Latin: Mzuzuen(sis)) is the Roman Catholic diocese located in Mzuzu in Malawi. It is in the Ecclesiastical Province of the Archdiocese of Lilongwe.

== History ==
- May 8, 1947: Established as Apostolic Prefecture of Northern Nyassa from the Apostolic Vicariate of Nyassa
- January 17, 1961: Promoted as Diocese of Mzuzu
- January 29, 1963: Missionary Sisters of Immaculate Conception (MIC) Nuns founded Marymount Catholic Secondary Girls School

== Bishops ==
- Prefects Apostolic of Northern Nyassa (Roman rite)
  - Father Marcello Saint-Denis, M. Afr. (1947.06.13 – 1957)
  - Father Jean-Louis Jobidon, M. Afr. (1958.01.03 – 1961.01.17 see below)
- Bishops of Mzuzu (Roman rite)
  - Bishop Jean-Louis Jobidon, M. Afr. (see above 1961.01.17 – 1987.10.01)
  - Bishop Joseph Mukasa Zuza (1995.03.03 - 2015.01.15)
  - Bishop John Alphonsus Ryan S.P.S. (2016.04.26 - )
  - Bishop Yohane Suzgo Nyirenda (Auxiliary Bishop 5 May 2023 - )

=== Other priest of this diocese who became bishop ===
- Martin Anwel Mtumbuka, appointed Bishop of Karonga in 2010

== See also ==
- Roman Catholicism in Malawi
